= Tytsjerksteradiel =

Tytsjerksteradiel Tietjerksteradeel
- Municipality
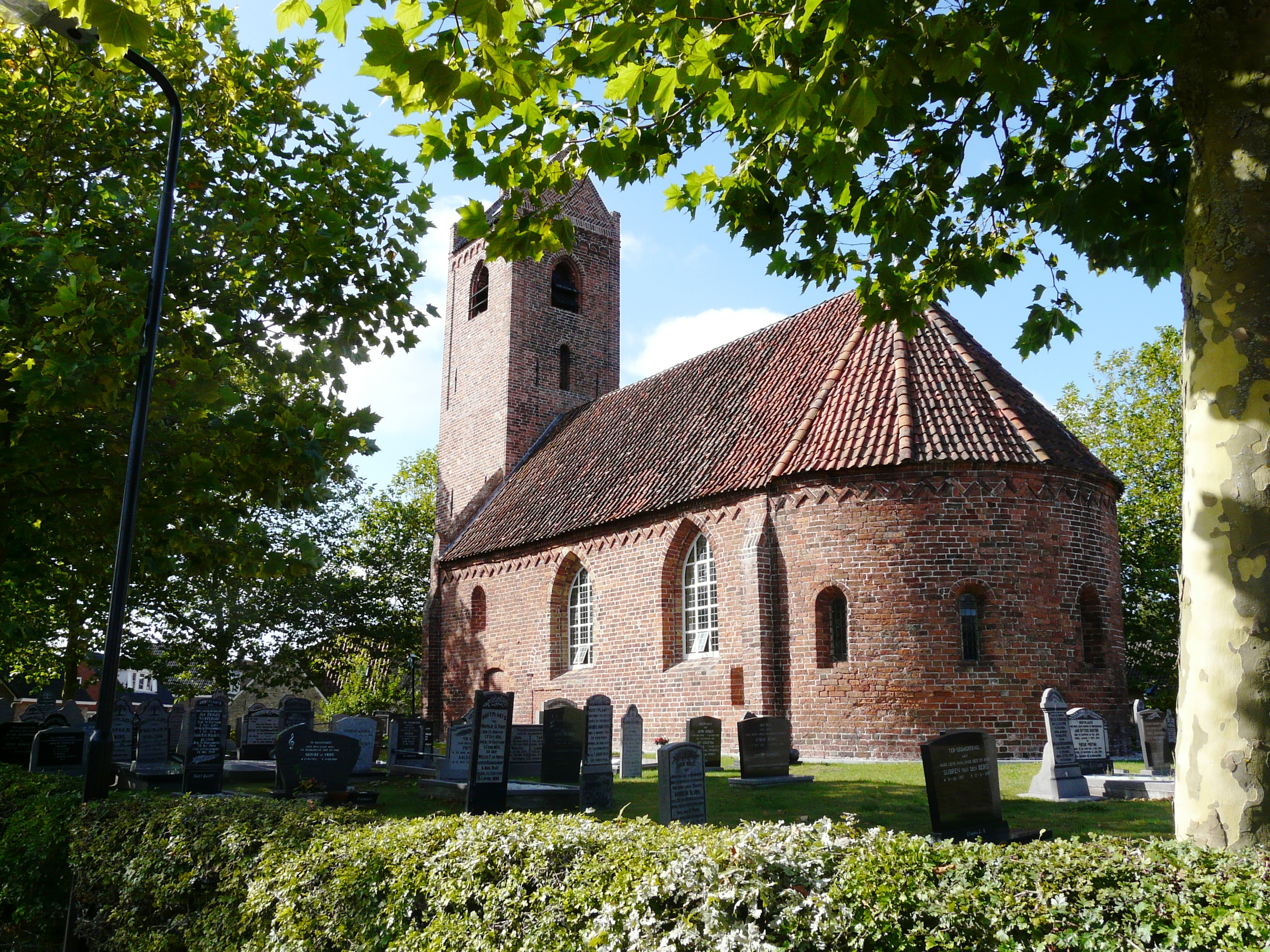
- Thirteenth century church in Jistrum

- Flag Coat of arms

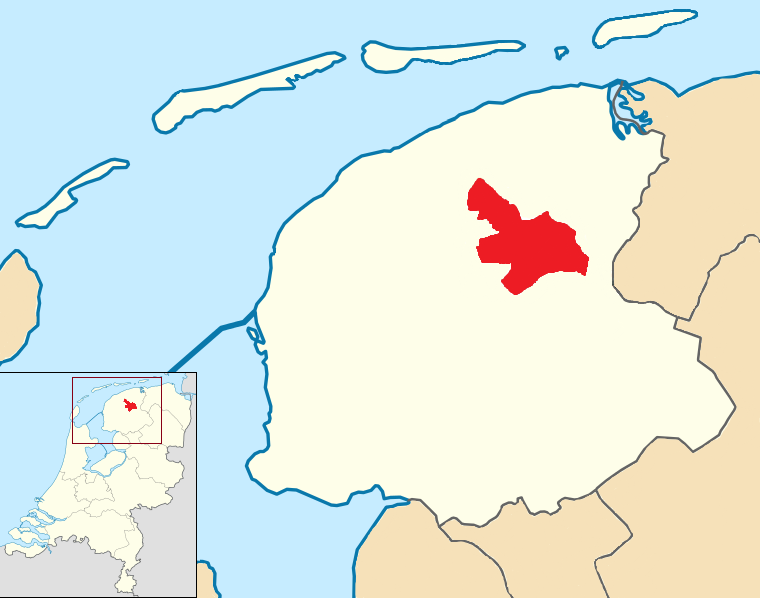
- Location in Friesland
- Coordinates: 53°12′N 6°0′E
- Country: Netherlands
- Province: Friesland

Government
  - Body: Municipal council
  - Mayor: Kanter Breuker

Area
  - Total: 161.41 km^{2} (62.32 sq mi)
  - Land: 148.86 km^{2} (57.48 sq mi)
  - Water: 12.55 km^{2} (4.85 sq mi)
- Elevation: 1 m (3.3 ft)

Population (January 2021)
  - Total: 32,060
  - Density: 215/km^{2} (560/sq mi)
- Time zone: UTC+1 (CET)
  - Summer (DST): UTC+2 (CEST)
- Postcode: Parts of 9000 range
- Area code: 0511, 0512, 058
- Website: www.tytsjerksteradiel.nl
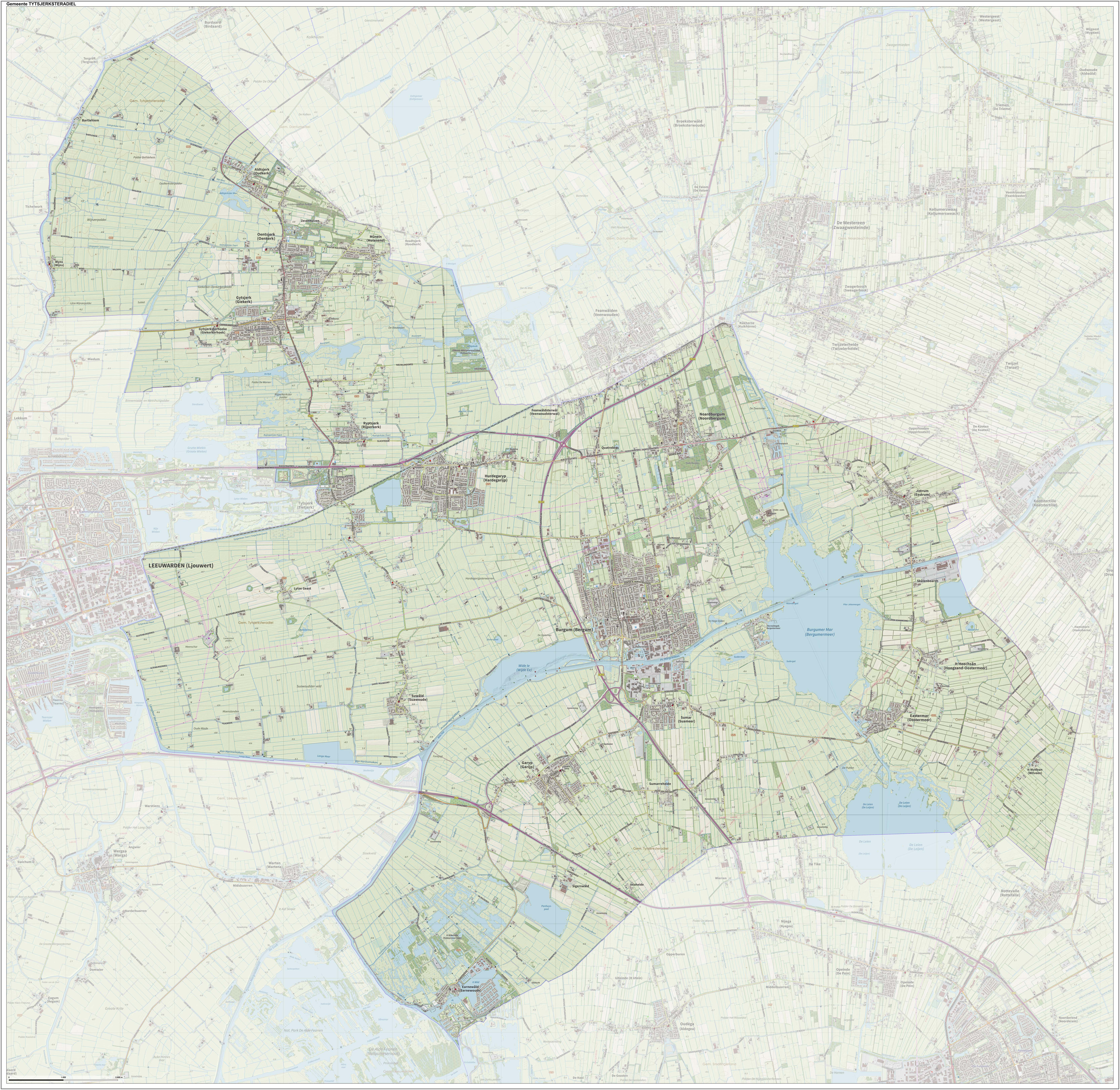
- Dutch topographic map of the municipality of Tytsjerksteradiel, September 2023

Tytsjerksteradiel (West Frisian pronunciation: [tiˈtsjɛrkstəraˌdiəl]) is a municipality in the province of Friesland in the Netherlands. It is named after the town of Tytsjerk, whose name is derived from a person named Tiete. Tiete was a daughter of Tryn, after whom the region (Trynwâlden) is named. The other villages in Trynwâlden are also named after Tryn's children: Oentsjerk (Oene), Gytsjerk (Giete), Readtsjerk (Reade), Aldtsjerk (Âlde), Ryptsjerk (Rype). A statue of Tryn and her children is placed in Oentsjerk next to the mainroad (Rengerswei). Tsjerk is the West Frisian word for Church. Until 1989 the official name of the municipality was Tietjerksteradeel (pronounced [tiˈtɕɛr(ə)kstəraːˌdeːl]), the Dutch name; the current official name is West Frisian. The largest village in the municipality is Burgum.

== Population centers ==
The administrative centre and largest village in the municipality is Burgum.

| Official name | Dutch name | Population (1-1-2014) |
|---|---|---|
| Aldtsjerk | Oudkerk | 656 |
| Bartlehiem (partially) | Bartlehiem | c. 70 |
| Burgum | Bergum | 9990 |
| Earnewâld | Eernewoude | 391 |
| Eastermar | Oostermeer | 1586 |
| Feanwâldsterwâl (partially) | Veenwoudsterwal | |
| Garyp | Garijp | 1916 |
| Gytsjerk | Giekerk | 2344 |
| Hurdegaryp | Hardegarijp | 4828 |
| Jistrum | Eestrum | 945 |
| Mûnein | Moleneind | 689 |
| Noardburgum | Noordbergum | 2228 |
| Oentsjerk | Oenkerk | 1755 |
| Ryptsjerk | Rijperkerk | 786 |
| Sumar | Suameer | 1424 |
| Suwâld | Suawoude | 672 |
| Tytsjerk | Tietjerk | 1569 |
| Wyns | Wijns | 208 |

=== Hamlets ===
- Altenburch (Altenburg)
- De Joere
- Gytsjerksterhoeke (Giekerkerhoek)
- Iniaheide
- It Heechsân (Hoogzand)
- It Wytfean (Witveen)
- Kûkherne (Kuikhorne) ((partially))
- Noardermar (Noordermeer)
- Lytse Geast (Kleinegeest)
- Quatrebras
- Sânhuzen (Zevenhuizen)
- Sigerswâld (Siegerswoude)
- Skûlenboarch (Schuilenburg)
- Sumarreheide (Suameerderheide)
- Swarteweisein (Zwartewegsend)
- Tergrêft (Tergraft) ((partially))

== Main sights ==
- Wyns, Aldtsjerk, Jistrum, Eastermar, Oentsjerk, Burgum and Gytsjerk are home to medieval churches
- The villages Aldtsjerk, Earnewâld, Ryptsjerk, Sumar, Tytsjerk (De Lytse Geast and De Himriksmole) and Wyns are home to mills.
- The Burgumer Lake
- The Museum for Folklore in Earnewâld
- The Skûtsje-Museum in Earnewâld
- The Heimatmuseum with an Observatory in Burgum.

== Notable people ==
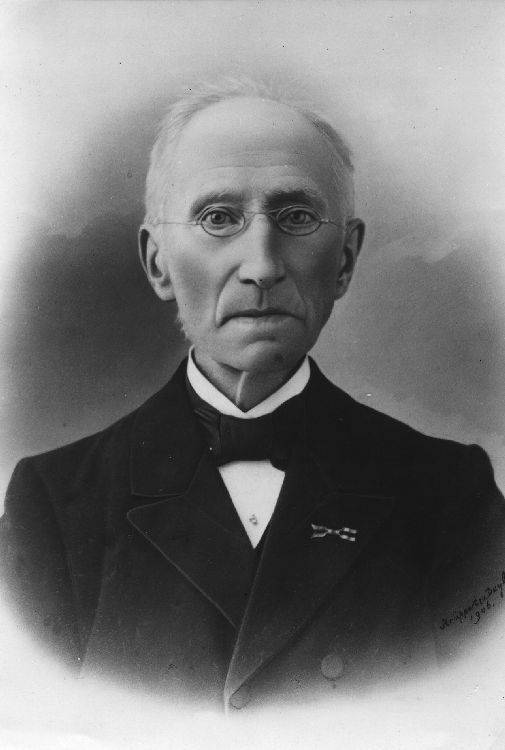
Tjibbe Geerts van der Meulen, 1906

- Adriaen van Cronenburg (ca.1525 – 1604 in Bergum) a Northern Netherlandish painter of portraits
- Rombertus van Uylenburgh (1554 in Burgum – 1624) academic and father-in-law of Rembrandt
- Jurjentje Aukes Rauwerda (1812 in Oentsjerk – 1877) a Dutch prostitute and procurer. Ran the largest brothel in Amsterdam
- Tsjibbe Gearts van der Meulen (1824 in Burgum – 1906) writer, poet, clock-maker, book seller, printer and publisher
- Piet Bouman (1892 – 1980 in Tietjerksteradeel) a Dutch amateur football player who competed in the 1912 Summer Olympics
- Enneüs Heerma (1944 in Rijperkerk – 1999) a Dutch politician
- Henk Stallinga (born 1962 in Tytsjerksteradiel) a Dutch multidisciplinary contemporary artist
- Marjon Wijnsma (born 1965 in Giekerk) a retired Dutch heptathlete
- Doutzen Kroes (born 1985 in Eastermar) a Dutch model, actress, activist and philanthropist

== Gallery ==
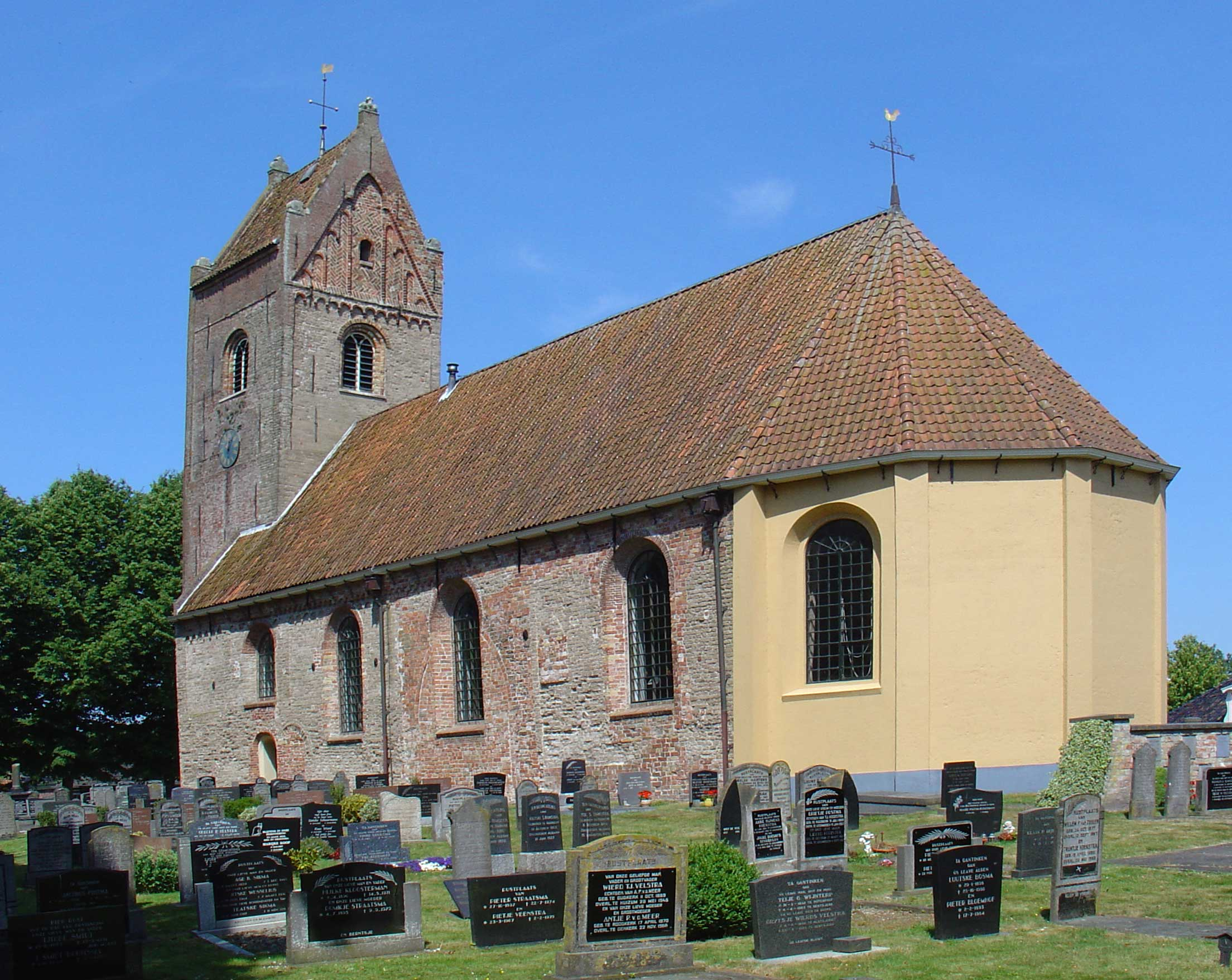
The church of Aldtsjerk (12th century)

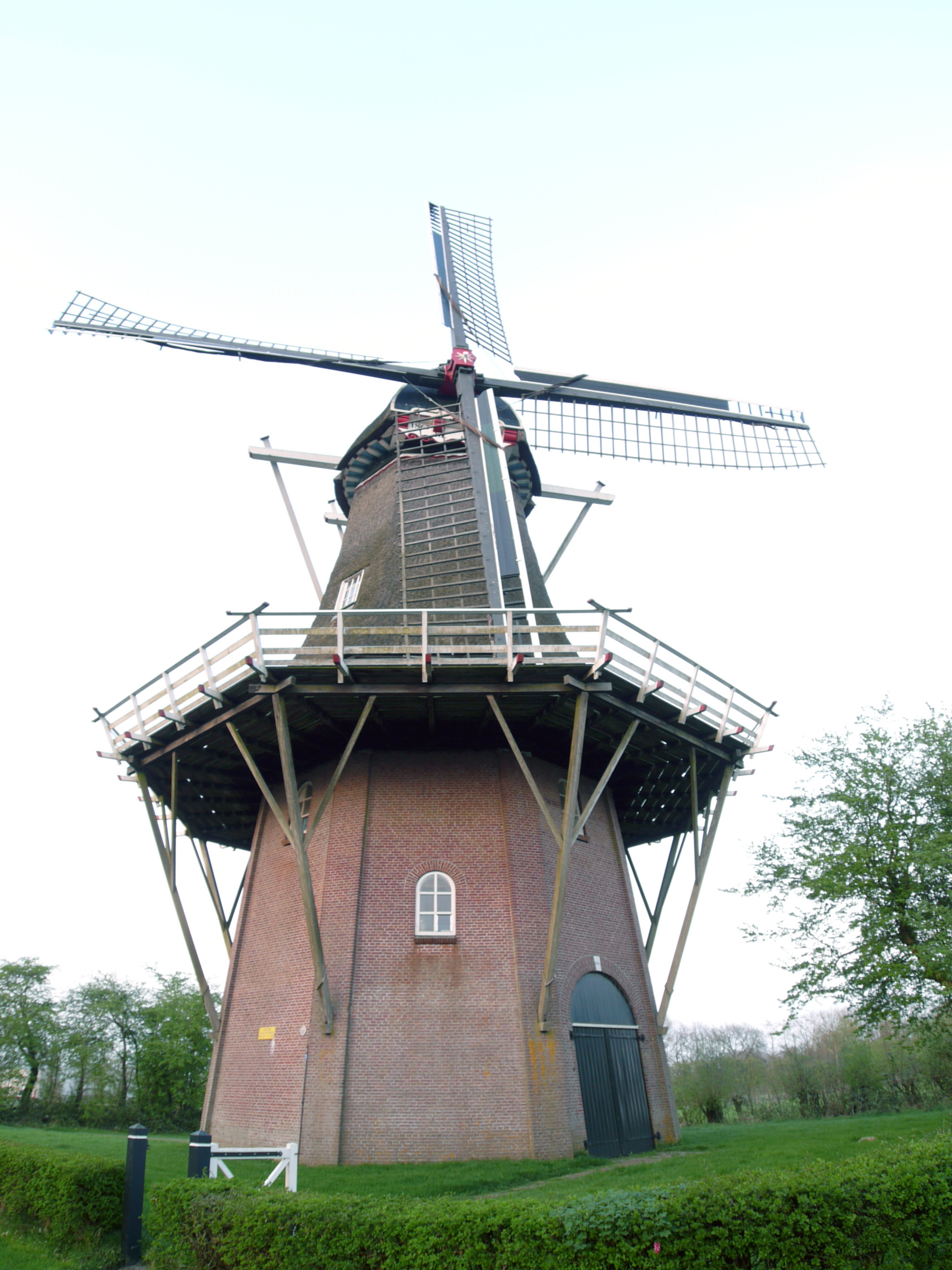
Gristmill ‘De Hoop’ in Sumar, built in 1882

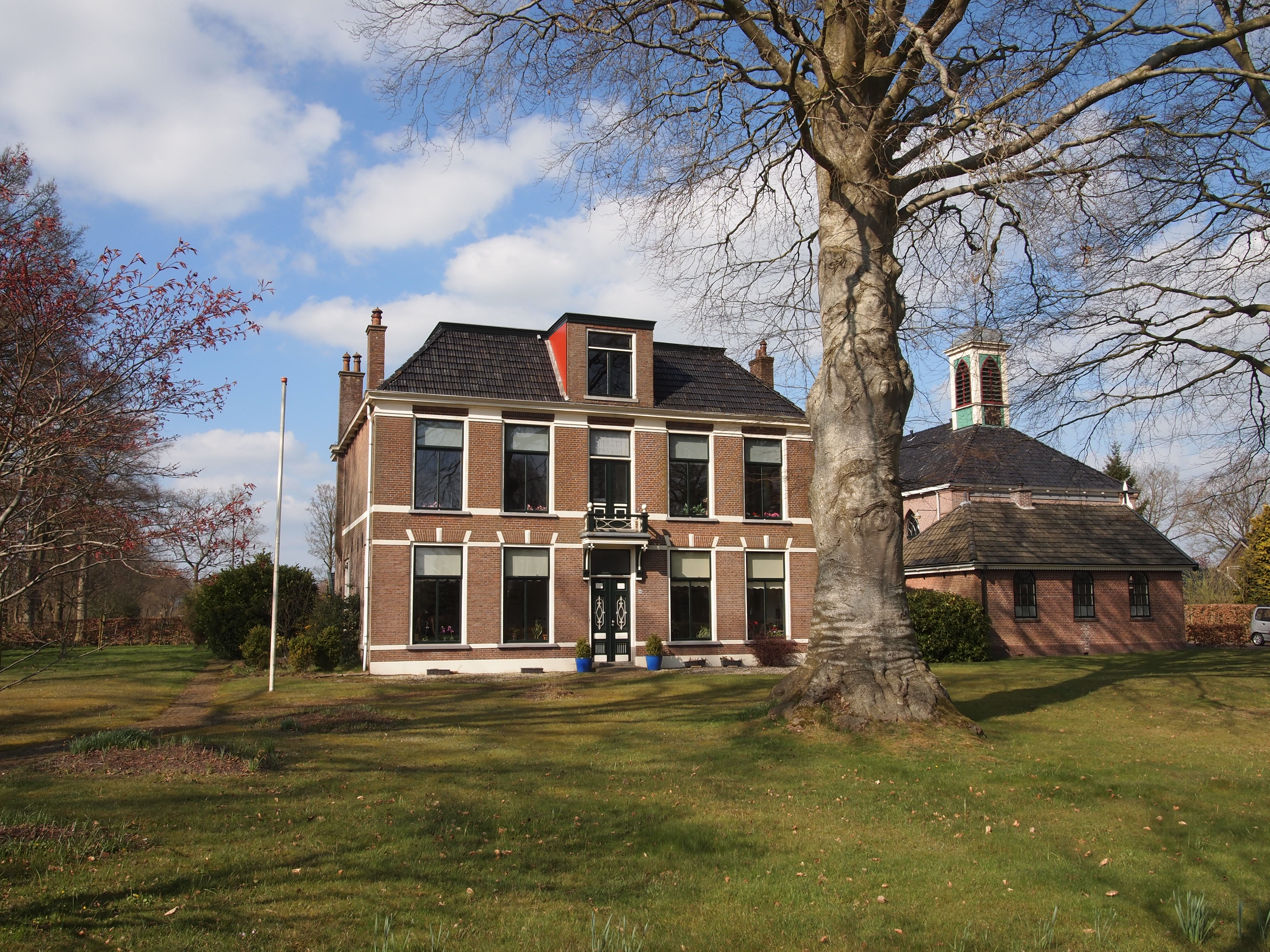
Pastorie en Hervormde kerk in Noordbergum

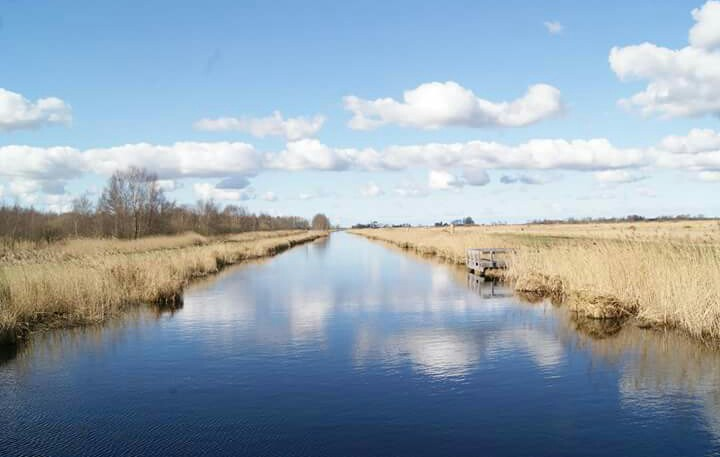
Eernesloot - Eernewoude
