= Zevenhuizen =

Zevenhuizen is a common name for places in the Netherlands, meaning seven houses.

== Hamlets ==
- Zevenhuizen, Bunschoten, hamlet in Bunschoten, Utrecht
- Zevenhuizen, Eemsmond, hamlet in Eemsmond, Groningen
- Zevenhuizen, Franekeradeel, hamlet in Franekeradeel, Friesland
- Zevenhuizen, Heeze-Leende, hamlet in Heeze-Leende, North Brabant
- Zevenhuizen, Kaag en Braassem, hamlet in Kaag en Braassem, South Holland
- Zevenhuizen, Kollumerland en Nieuwkruisland, hamlet in Kollumerland en Nieuwkruisland, Friesland
- Zevenhuizen, Maasdriel, hamlet in Maasdriel, Gelderland
- Zevenhuizen, Moerdijk, hamlet in Moerdijk, North Brabant
- Zevenhuizen, Ten Boer (Zevenhuisjes), hamlet in Ten Boer, Groningen
- Zevenhuizen, Texel, hamlet in Texel, North Holland
- Zevenhuizen, Tytsjerksteradiel, hamlet in Tytsjerksteradiel, Friesland
- Zevenhuizen, Werkendam, hamlet in Werkendam, North Brabant

== Street ==
- Zevenhuizen, Heiloo, village in Heiloo, North Holland

== Quarters ==
- Zevenhuizen, Apeldoorn, quarter in Apeldoorn, Gelderland

== Villages ==
- Zevenhuizen, Westerkwartier, village in Westerkwartier, Groningen
- Zevenhuizen, Zuidplas, village in Zuidplas, South Holland
