= Kûkherne =

- Hamlet
- Location in the Netherlands Kûkherne (Netherlands)
- Country: Netherlands
- Province: Friesland
- Municipality: Achtkarspelen
- Municipality: Dantumadiel
- Municipality: Tytsjerksteradiel
- Time zone: UTC+1 (CET)
  - Summer (DST): UTC+2 (CEST)

Kûkherne (Dutch: Kuikhorne or Kuijkhorne) is a hamlet in the municipalities of Achtkarspelen, Dantumadiel and Tytsjerksteradiel, in the province of Friesland, the Netherlands.

Kûkherne is located south of the railway bridge over the Nije Feart between De Westereen and Feanwâlden. The meaning of the first part of the place name is unknown, 'herne' means 'corner'. Kuikhorne is relatively large for a hamlet and sometimes it's referred as a village itself. In terms of official address it's divided among four villages; Feanwâlden, De Westereen, Noardburgum and Twijzelerheide.

== History ==
The place originated in the 14th or 15th century at a crossroads between De Swemmer and the later Kûkhernster Feart. The latter was probably excavated by order of monks from the St. Nicolaes kleaster in Burgum. In 1583, 50 men were billeted in Kûkherne, probably for the defense of Spanish attacking troops.

Kûkherne was not really big at the time. That growth came in the 17th century, but it stopped in the following century. In the 18th century there was talk of a nucleus. During the widening of the bridge over the De Swemmer (1805), the core of hamlet was partly demolished. But that wasn't the end of Kûkherne. At the end of the 17th century, Nieuw Kuikhorne was arising along the canal to the south. This was partly the reason that Kûkherne's growth stalled.

In the beginning of the 18th century this new place grew. But there was a problem. The water from the canal regularly flowed over the fields and roads. At the end of the 18th century, only a fraction of the rapidly expanding place was left. In 1840 there were nine workers' houses left according to the census, these were removed in 1880/81 for the widening of the canal. But the widening was in the long run good for the growth of Kûkherne. This growth continued in the 20th century. In the early 21st century, part of the hamlet consists of a relatively large marina and recreational campsites at this marina.
