= Sumarreheide =

Sumarreheide Suameerderheide
- Hamlet
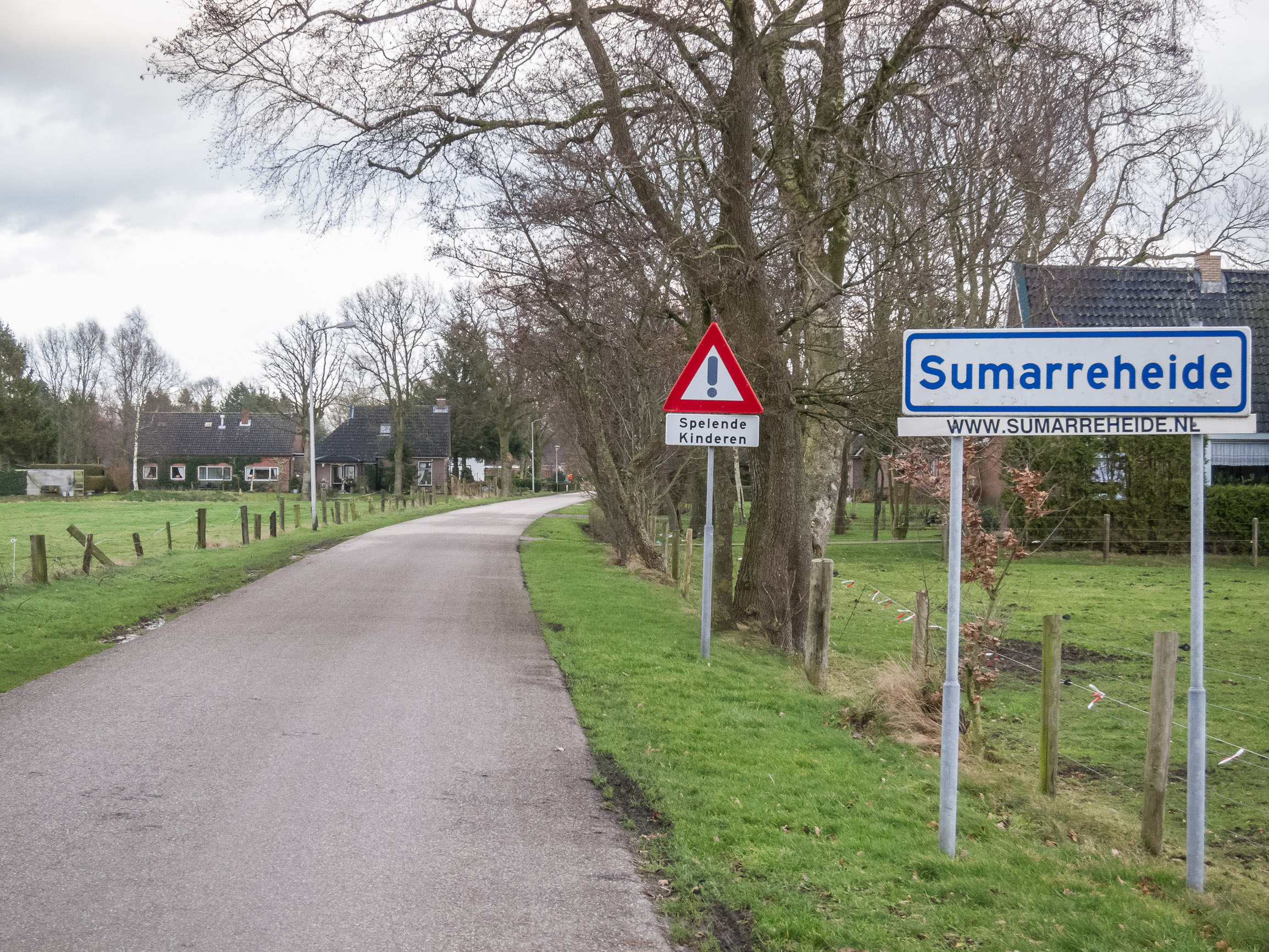

- Location in the Netherlands Sumarreheide (Netherlands)
- Coordinates: 53.164°N 5.999°E
- Country: Netherlands
- Province: Friesland
- Municipality: Tytsjerksteradiel
- Time zone: UTC+1 (CET)
  - Summer (DST): UTC+2 (CEST)
- Postal code: 9262
- Dialing code: 0511

Sumarreheide (Dutch: Suameerderheide) is a hamlet in Tytsjerksteradiel in the province of Friesland, the Netherlands.

Sumarreheide is not a statistical entity, and the postal authorities have placed it under Sumar. The hamlet has place name signs.

The hamlet was first mentioned around 1700 as Heyd Huysen, and become Suameerderheide in the 20th century. The inhabitants of the hamlet used to live in sod houses. In 1916, ten stone houses were built.
