= Iniaheide =

- Hamlet
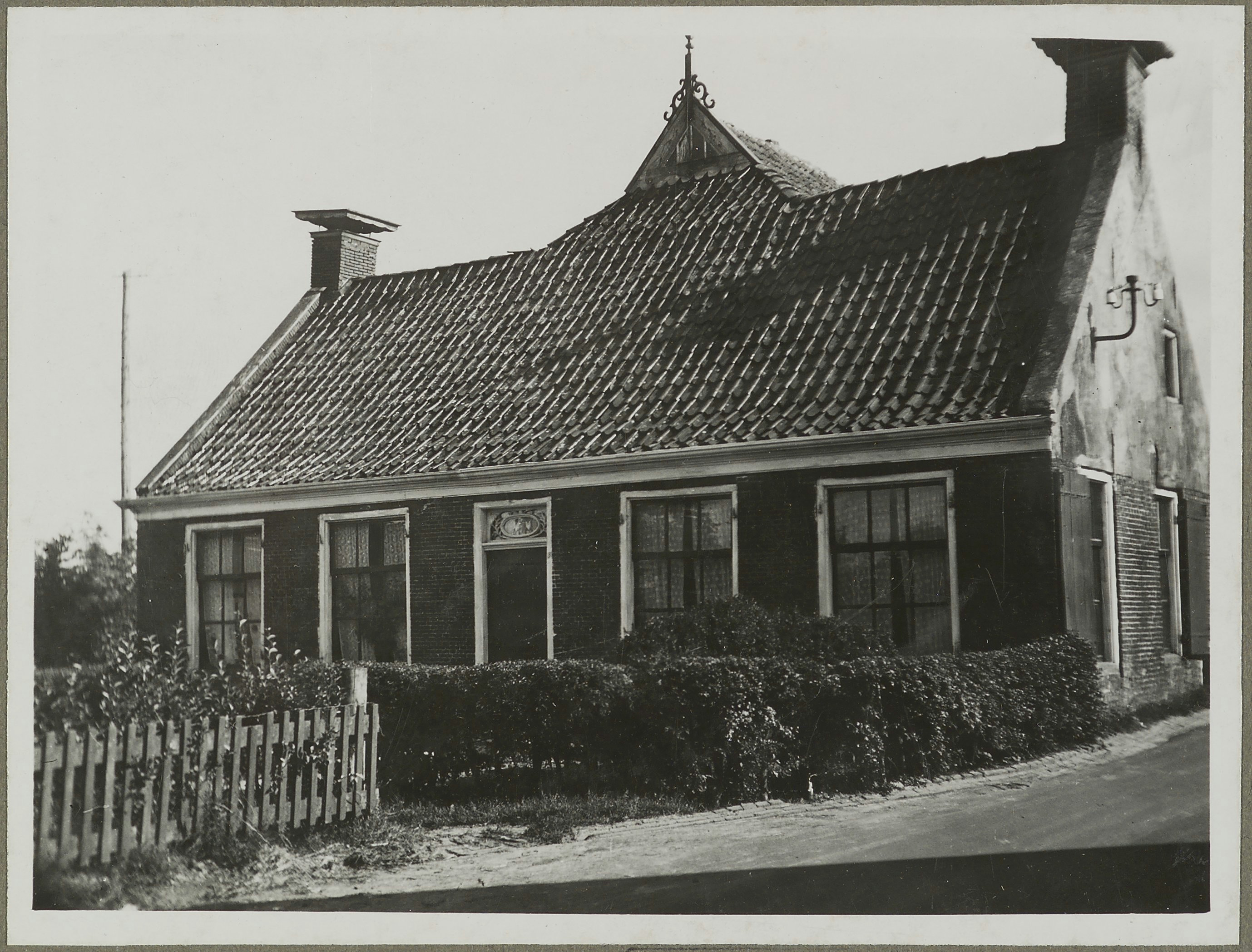
- Farm in Iniaheide

- Location in the Netherlands Iniaheide (Netherlands)
- Coordinates: 53°09′N 6°00′E
- Country: Netherlands
- Province: Friesland
- Municipality: Tytsjerksteradiel
- Time zone: UTC+1 (CET)
  - Summer (DST): UTC+2 (CEST)
- Postal code: 9263
- Dialing code: 0511

Iniaheide is a hamlet in Tytsjerksteradiel in the province of Friesland, the Netherlands.

Iniaheide is not a statistical entity, and the postal authorities have placed it under Garyp. There are no place name signs. It consists of about 10 houses.
