= Quatrebras =

- Hamlet
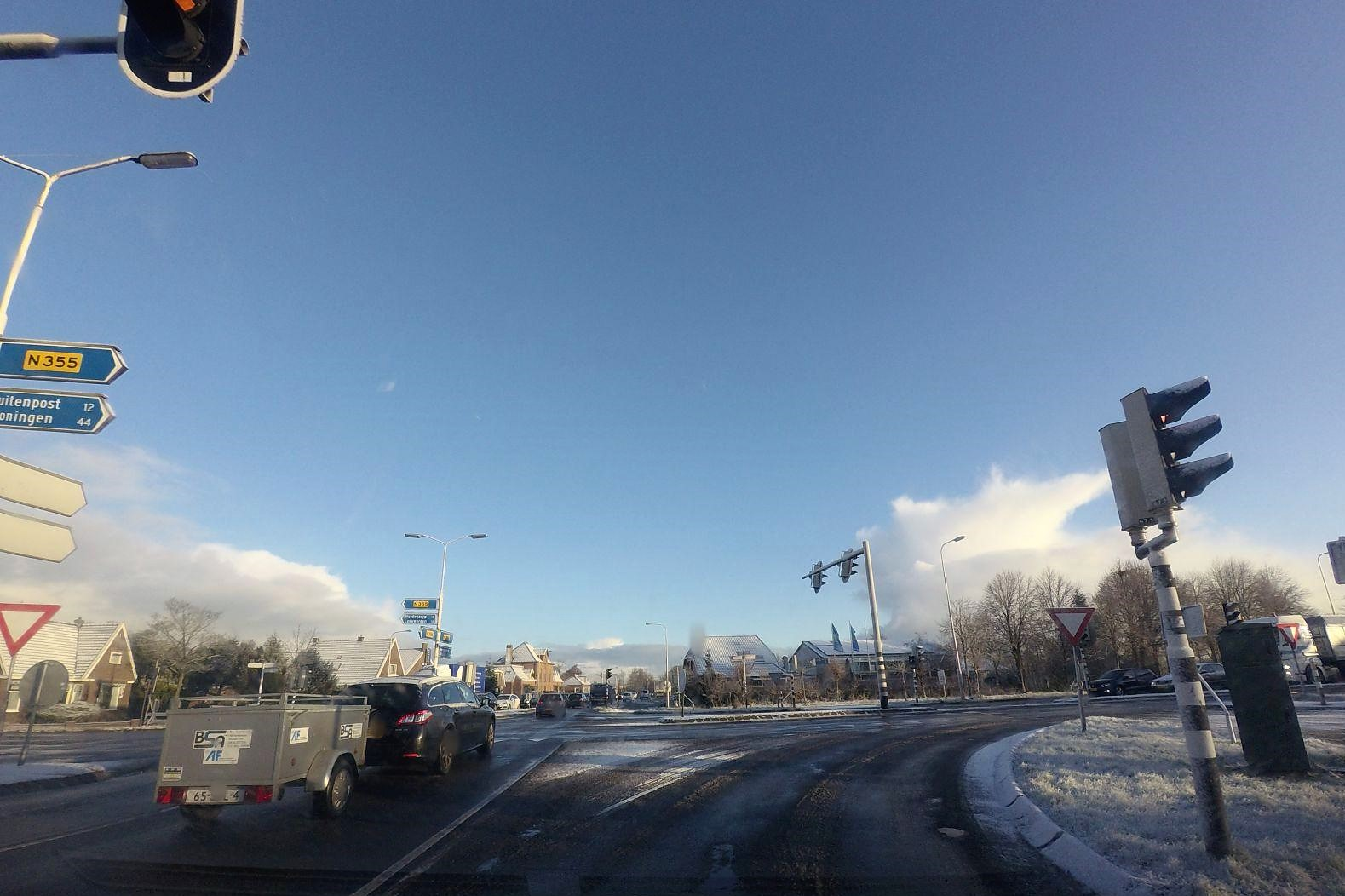
- Streets of Quatrebras

- Location in the Netherlands Quatrebras (Netherlands)
- Country: Netherlands
- Province: Friesland
- Municipality: Tytsjerksteradiel
- Time zone: UTC+1 (CET)
  - Summer (DST): UTC+2 (CEST)
- Postal code: 9257
- Dialing code: 0511

Quatrebras is a hamlet in Tytsjerksteradiel in the province of Friesland, the Netherlands.

Quatrebras (four arms) is the French word for crossroads. In this case, it is the intersection of the roads N355 and N356. The hamlet was best known for its disco, Club Quatrebras (later renamed Club Q), however the COVID-19 pandemic caused the permanent closure in 2021. In December 2021, the building was demolished.

Quatrebras is not a statistical entity, and the postal authorities have placed it under Noardburgum. It has place name signs, and consists of about 35 houses.

== Gallery ==
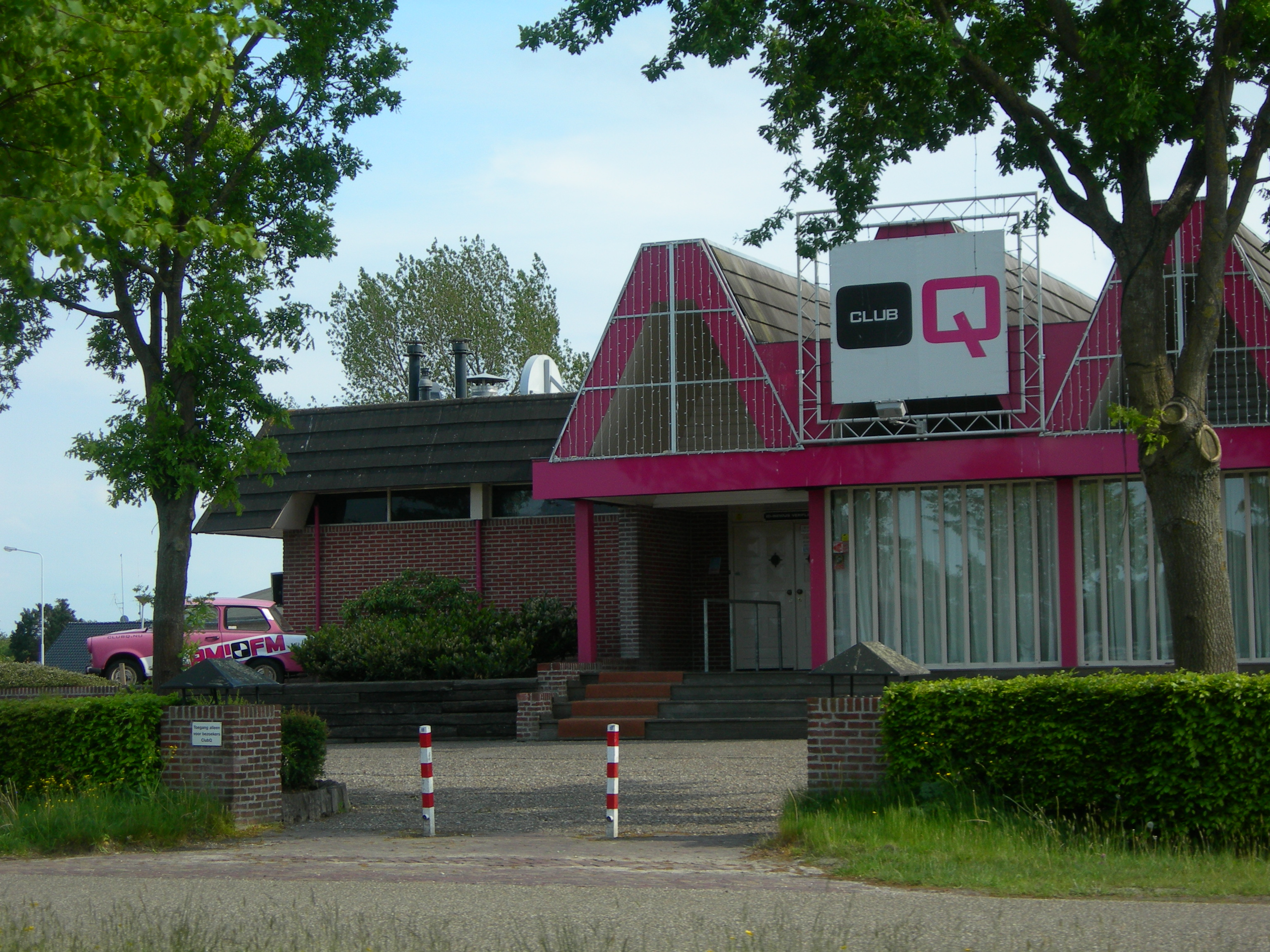
Club Q (2011)
