= Sigerswâld =

Sigerswâld Siegerswoude
- Hamlet
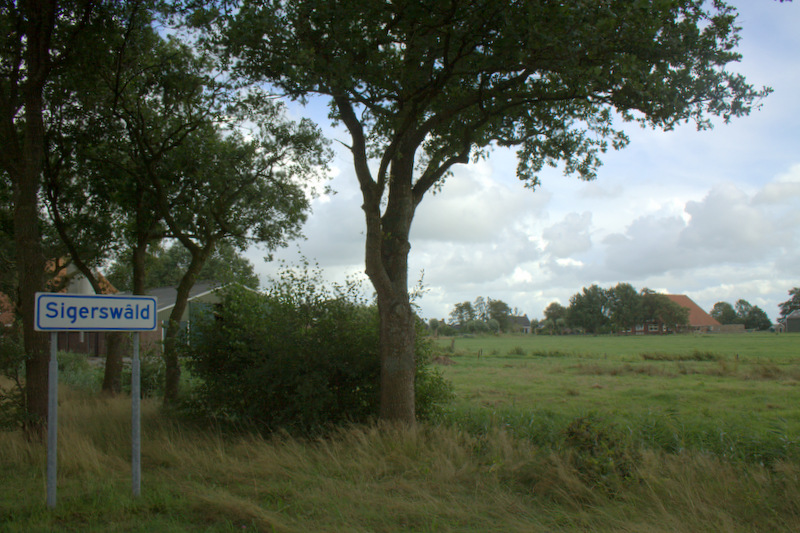
- Welcome to Sigerswâld

- Location in the Netherlands Sigerswâld (Netherlands)
- Coordinates: 53°9′2.3″N 5°58′23.8″E
- Country: Netherlands
- Province: Friesland
- Municipality: Tytsjerksteradiel
- Time zone: UTC+1 (CET)
  - Summer (DST): UTC+2 (CEST)
- Postal code: 9263
- Dialing code: 0511

Sigerswâld (Dutch: Siegerswoude) is a hamlet in Tytsjerksteradiel in the province of Friesland, the Netherlands.

Sigerswâld is not a statistical entity, and the postal authorities have placed it under Garyp. The hamlet has place name signs.

The hamlet was first mentioned in 1484 as Sigherswold, and means "forest of Sieger (person)". Sigerswâld was home to 75 people in 1840. Nowadays, it consists of about 20 houses.

== History ==
Sigerswâld used to be a village. In 1482, five nuns from Hoorn arrive in the area after having fled from the Hook and Cod wars. They move into the abandoned church. The Bishop of Utrecht allows them to start the convent Sinaï. During the Reformation, the monastery was forced to close, and was demolished in 1581.
