= Bintje =

Potato variety

Potato Bintje
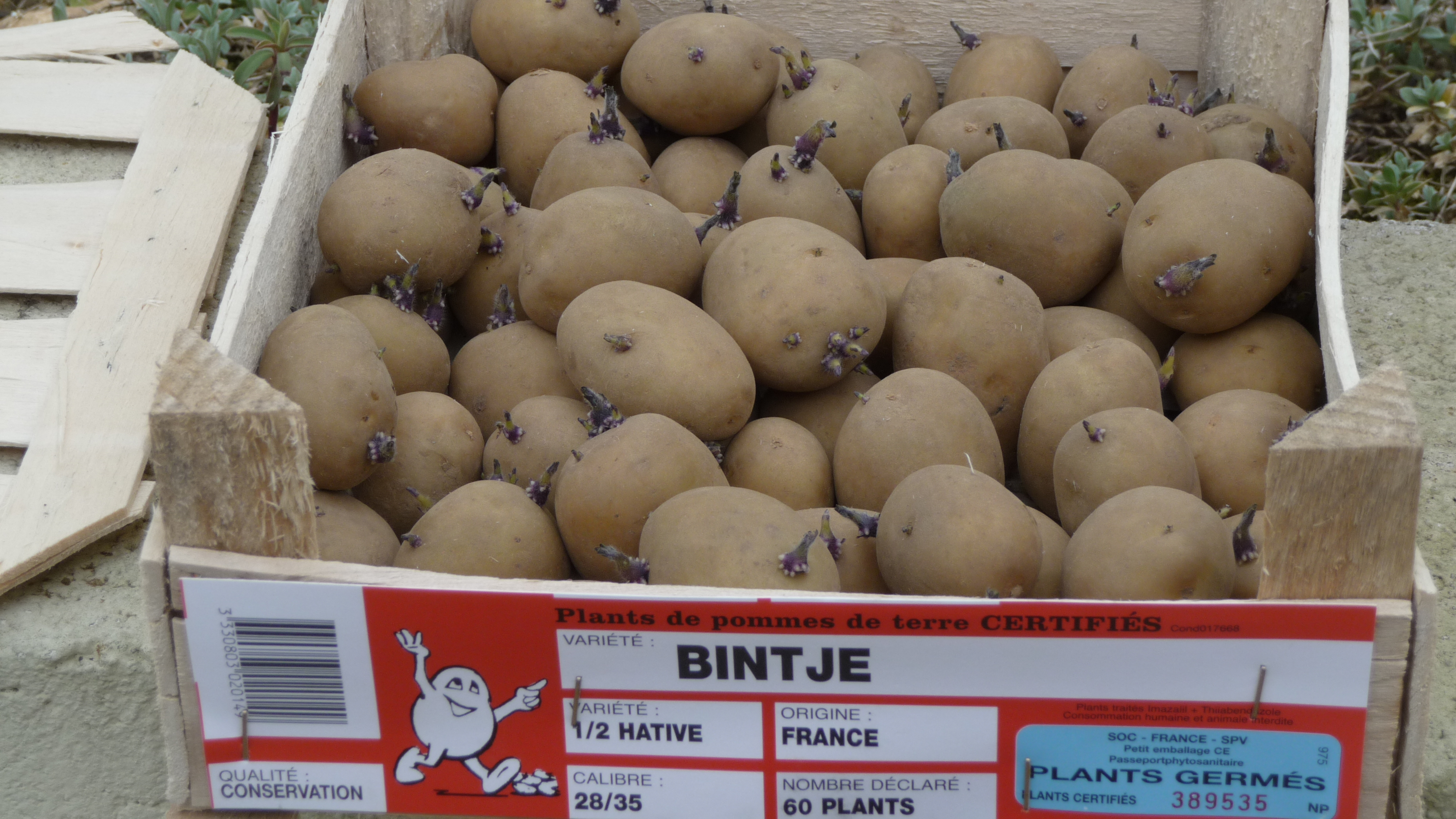
- Bintje potatoes
- Genus: solanum
- Species: Solanum tuberosum
- Hybrid parentage: Munstersen x Fransen
- Cultivar: Bintje
- Breeder: K.L. de Vries, 1904
- Origin: Netherlands

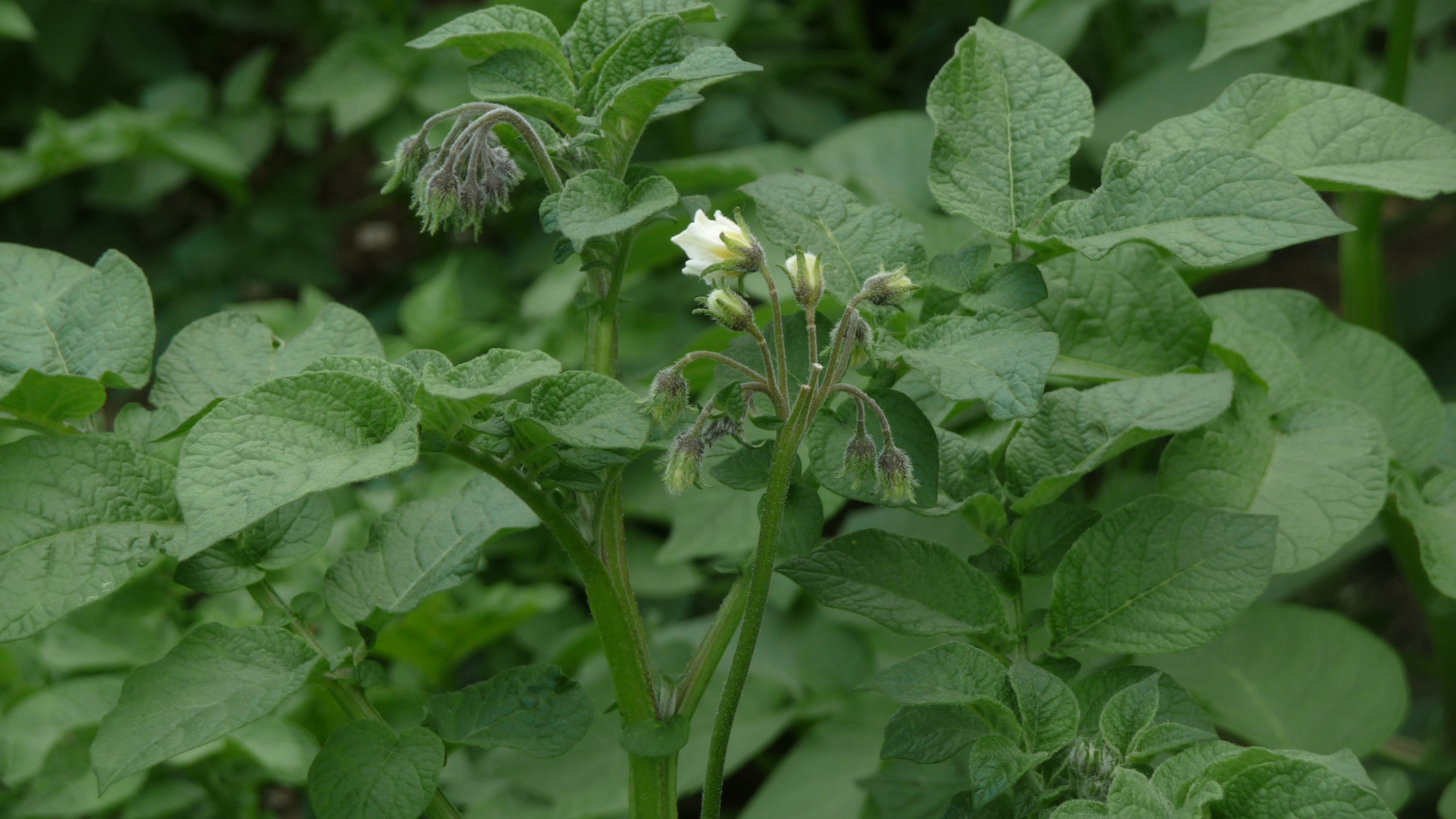
Plant and flower of the variety Bintje

Freshly harvested Bintje potatoes from a small vegetable garden.

Bintje /ˈbɪntʃə/ is a middle-early ripening potato variety bred in the Netherlands by the Frisian schoolmaster Kornelis Lieuwes de Vries in 1904 from (Munstersen x Fransen) and marketed for the first time in 1910. The name of the potato, a diminutive of Benedict, was borrowed from one of his former students.

Bintje plants are medium-sized and erect, with purplish stems, dark green leaves and white flowers.

Bintje produces large oval-shaped tubers with pale yellow skin and yellow flesh. It has shallow eyes. The sprouts are purplish.

This high-yielding variety is widely grown in Europe and North Africa. It is used for boiling, baking, and for fries, mashed potato and potato chips. It is the most widely cultivated potato in France and Belgium.

Bintje is immune to potato virus A. It has moderate resistance to potato leafroll virus. It is susceptible to netted scab, common scab, Fusarium dry rot (Fusarium oxysporum), potato wart (Synchytrium endobioticum), potato virus X, potato virus Y, and late blight (Phytophthora infestans). Bintje is sterile, which prevents improvements in disease resistance through breeding. A mechanism to overcome sterility has recently allowed for breeding-based genetic improvements in disease resistance and potato tuber coloration.

It was voted "potato of the year 2012".

== Lieuwes Kornelis de Vries ==
Lieuwes Kornelis de Vries was born on February 25, 1854, in Hurdegaryp. In 1881 he married Grietje Hommes de Jong. From this marriage six children were born. After the death of his first wife (1895) he married Afke Glee in 1897. From this marriage two children were born. De Vries died on November 20, 1929.

De Vries worked until he was 21 on the farm and then went to study for a teaching degree. In 1883 he became the head teacher at the primary school of Sumar. In 1894 he took the agricultural instrument test and in 1901 obtained a horticulture degree. Besides his work as a schoolmaster, he gave agricultural winter courses. De Vries was a member of the Frisian Society of Agriculture. In 1898 the Society asked him to organize a testing ground for growing potatoes, which he managed for 25 years. In twenty-five years, he grew about 150 varieties, of which only the Bintje was a success. The Bintje has been the most important potato on Dutch menus for a long time.
