= De Hoop, Sumar =

Smock mill in Friesland, Netherlands

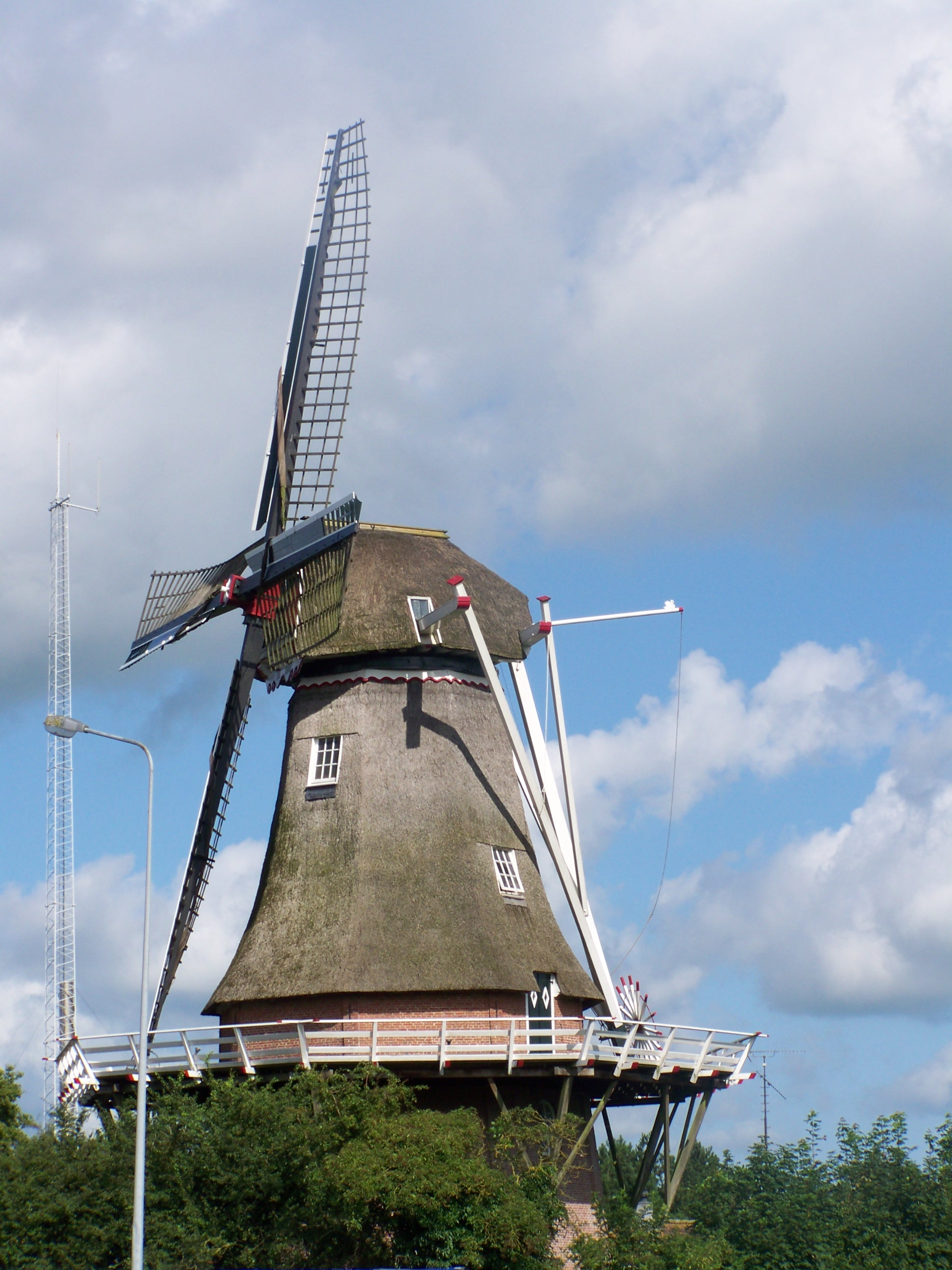
- De Hoop, August 2012
- Interactive map of De Hoop, Sumar

Origin
- Mill name: De Hoop
- Mill location: Mounepaed 3, 9262 NE Sumar
- Coordinates: 53°10′4″N 5°59′52″E
- Operator: Gemeente Tytsjerksteradiel
- Year built: 1867

Information
- Purpose: Corn mill, formerly also a pearl barley mill
- Type: Smock mill
- Storeys: Two storey smock
- Base storeys: Three storey base
- Smock sides: Eight sides
- No. of sails: Four sails
- Type of sails: Common sails
- Windshaft: Cast iron
- Winding: Tailpole and winch
- Auxiliary power: Formerly a steam engine
- No. of pairs of millstones: Two pairs
- Size of millstones: 1.60 metres (5 ft 3 in)

De Hoop (English: The Hope) is a smock mill in Sumar, Friesland, Netherlands which was built in 1867 and is in working order. The mill is listed as a Rijksmonument.

== History ==
A windmill that had stood on this site had before 1867. In that year, a corn and pearl barley mill built on this site for Geert Hammens de Jong of Hurdegaryp, Friesland. The mill changed hands a number of times, and was in the ownership of Jouke Hedzers Looijenga of Garyp, Friesland. The mill was destroyed by fire on 19 December 1881. Losses amounted to ƒ9,300. The brick base survived and was advertised for sale in 1882. In that year, permission was sought for a replacement mill and steam engine. This was denied because the proposal did not conform to regulation then in force. The miller's house and surviving base were purchased at auction by Jacob Jans Formsma for ƒ2,250.

The smock tower of mill was moved from Kootstertille, Friesland by millwright T L Veenstra of Kootstertille. The mill was the Molen van Kootstra, a rye and pearl barley mill that had been built in 1867. The miller, Jacob Hylkes Kootstra, had borrowed ƒ6,000 in 1875 but had been unable to repay the money. The mill was sold by auction on 21 March 1882 to Jacob Jans Formsma and was removed from Kootstertille between 8–10 April. The new mill was named De Hoop. Sipke Rienks Kuipers was the next owner. In 1919, the mill was bought by Anne Terpstra. She sold it in 1920 to Marten Zwart. In 1923, the mill was sold to Anne van der Wal.

De Hoop was working until 1947, after which its condition deteriorated. It was sold to Jan Posthumus in 1956. The mill was purchased by the Gemeente Tytsjerksteradiel in 1964. Restorations were carried out in 1965–66 by Fabrikaat Medendorp of Zuidlaren, Drenthe and in 1992–93 by Bouwbedrijf Kolthof of Stiens, Friesland. The mill is listed as a Rijksmonument, No. 35683.

== Description ==
De Hoop is what the Dutch describe as a "Stellingmolen". It is a smock mill on a brick base. The stage is 8.00 metres (26 ft 3 in) above ground level. The smock and cap are thatched. The mill is winded by tailpole and winch. The sails are Common sails. They have a span of 21.00 metres (68 ft 11 in). The sails are carried on a cast-iron windshaft, which was cast by the IJzergieterij De Prins van Oranje, The Hague, South Holland in 1874. The windshaft also carries the brake wheel, which has 59 cogs. This drives the wallower (30 cogs) at the top of the upright shaft. At the bottom of the upright shaft is the great spur wheel, which has 81 cogs. The great spur wheel drives a pair of 1.60 metres (5 ft 3 in) diameter Cullen millstones via a lantern pinion stone nut which has 22 staves and a second pair of 1.60 metres (5 ft 3 in) diameter Cullen millstones via a lantern pinion stone nut which has 23 staves. The mill was formerly fitted with Patent sails.

== Millers ==
- Geert Hammens de Jong (1867- )
- Jouke Hedzers Looijenga (1876–81)
- Jacob Jans Formsma (1882- )

References for above:-

== Public access ==
De Korenaar is open to the public on Saturdays between 09:00 and 14:00 or by appointment.
