= Ypey Mole, Ryptsjerk =

Windmill in Friesland, Netherlands

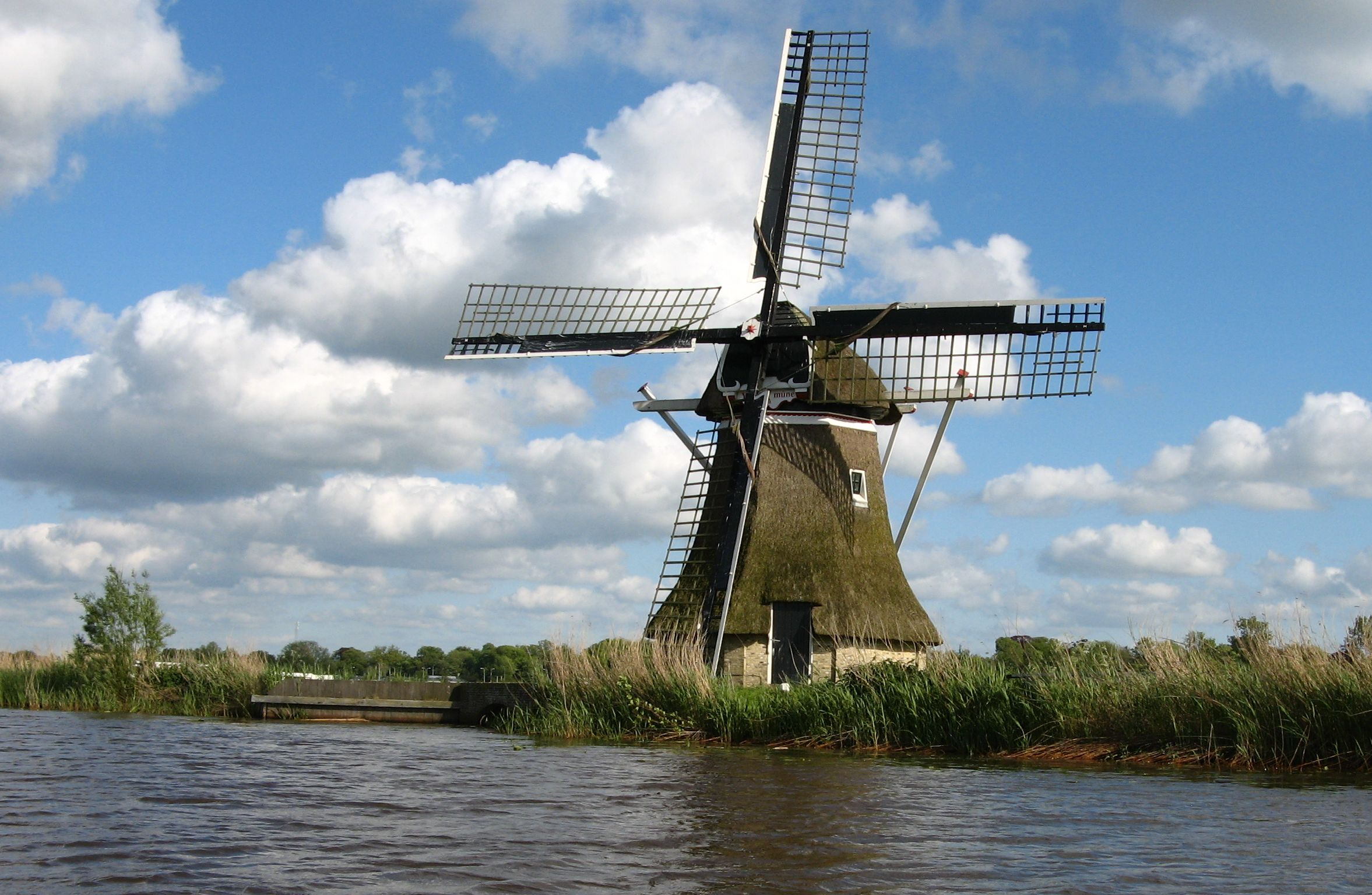
- Ypey Mole, May 2010.
- Interactive map of Ypey Mole, Ryptsjerk

Origin
- Mill name: Ypey Mole
- Mill location: Rijksstraatweg 9, 9256 XD, Ryptsjerk
- Coordinates: 53°13′21″N 5°54′05″E
- Operator: Stichting De Fryske Mole
- Year built: 1981

Information
- Purpose: Drainage mill
- Type: Smock mill
- Storeys: Two storey smock
- Base storeys: One storey base
- Smock sides: Eight sides
- No. of sails: Four sails
- Type of sails: Common sails
- Windshaft: Cast iron
- Winding: Tailpole and winch
- Type of pump: Archimedes screw

Ypey Mole is a smock mill in Ryptsjerk, Friesland, Netherlands which was built in 1911. The mill has been restored to working order. It is listed as a Rijksmonument.

== History ==
Ypey Mole was originally built in 1858 at Zwartewegsend, where it was in use until the Autumn of 1958 when the sails were damaged. The mill was restored in 1959 by millwright De Roos of Leeuwarden, Friesland. In November 1970, the mill was set on fire by some children. The fire brigade was able to prevent the mill being destroyed. The mill was moved to its current site in 1981 and restored by millwright Tacoma of Stiens, Friesland. Ypey Mole was sold to Stichting De Fryske Mole on 10 May 1982, the 31st mill acquired by that organisation. The mill is listed as a Rijksmonument, No.35687.

== Description ==
Ypey Mole is what the Dutch describe as a Grondzeiler. It is a two-storey smock mill on a single storey base. There is no stage, the sails reaching almost to ground level. The mill is winded by tailpole and winch. The smock and cap are thatched. The sails are Common sails. They have a span of 15.30 metres (50 ft 2 in). The sails are carried on a cast iron windshaft. The windshaft carries the brake wheel which has 50 cogs. This drives the wallower (31 cogs) at the top of the upright shaft. At the bottom of the upright shaft there are two crown wheels The upper crown wheel, which has 41 cogs drives an Archimedes' screw via a crown wheel. The lower crown wheel, which has 35 cogs is carried on the axle of an Archimedes' screw, which is used to drain the polder. The axle of the screw is 31 centimetres (1 ft 0 in) diameter . The screw is 1.85 metres (6 ft 1 in) diameter. It is inclined at 23°. Each revolution of the screw lifts 1,105 litres (243 imp gal) of water.

== Public access ==
Ypey Mole is open to the public by appointment.
