= It Wytfean =

It Wytfean Witveen
- Hamlet
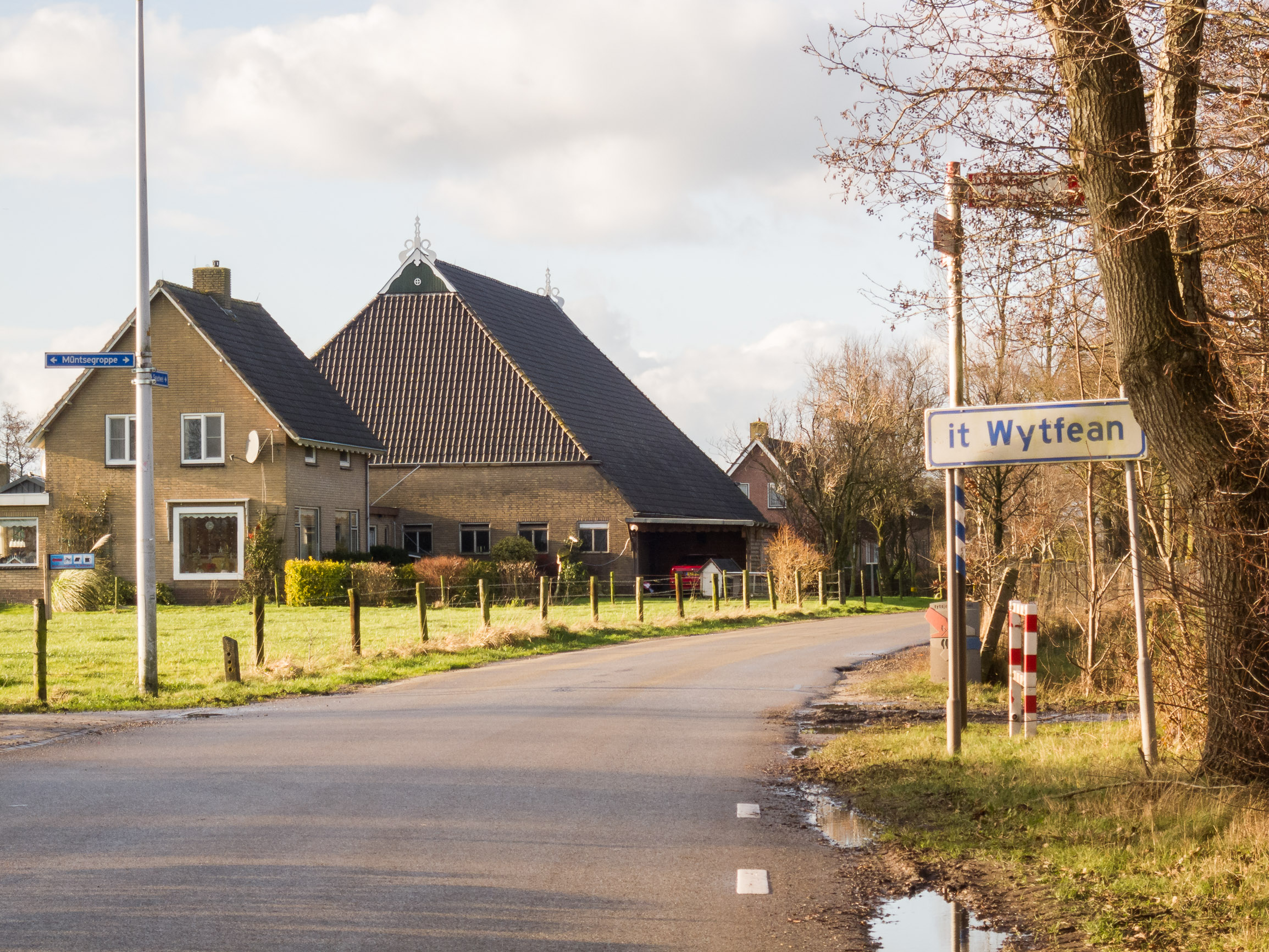

- Location in the Netherlands It Wytfean (Netherlands)
- Coordinates: 53°10′6″N 6°6′5″E
- Country: Netherlands
- Province: Friesland
- Municipality: Tytsjerksteradiel
- Time zone: UTC+1 (CET)
  - Summer (DST): UTC+2 (CEST)
- Postal code: 9261
- Dialing code: 0511

It Wytfean (Dutch: Witveen) is a hamlet in Tytsjerksteradiel in the province of Friesland, the Netherlands. It Wytfean has a Mennonite Church, and was a separate parish up to 1838 when it merged with Rottevalle.

It Wytfean is not a statistical entity, and the postal authorities have placed it under Eastermar. It Wytfean has place name signs.

The hamlet was first mentioned in 1543 as opt Witte feenen, and means "white moorland". It started as a peat colony in 1620 by Swiss Mennonite refugees. It Wytfean was home to 240 people in 1840. Nowadays, it consists of about 35 houses.
