= Piet Bouman =

Dutch footballer

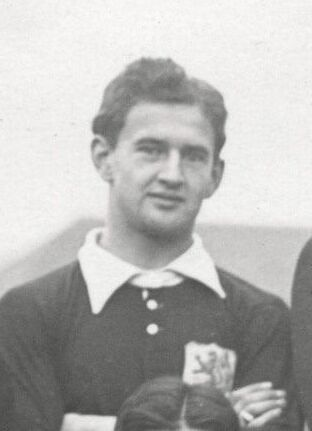
- Bouman (1913)

Personal information
- Full name: Pieter Bouman
- Date of birth: 14 October 1892
- Place of birth: Dordrecht, Netherlands
- Date of death: 20 July 1980 (aged 87)
- Place of death: Tietjerksteradeel, Netherlands
- Position: Leftback

Senior career*
Years	Team	Apps	(Gls)
1910–1914	DFC		
1914–1916	Haarlem		
1916–1918	U.D.		
1918–1925	DFC		

International career
1912–1914	Netherlands	9	(0)
- * Club domestic league appearances and goals

Medal record

Men's football

Representing Netherlands

Olympic Games
Bronze medal – third place	1912 Stockholm	Team competition

Pieter "Piet" Bouman (October 14, 1892 in Dordrecht – July 20, 1980 in Tietjerksteradeel) was a Dutch amateur football player who competed in the 1912 Summer Olympics.

== Club career ==
Bouman played for hometown side DFC, as well as for Haarlem, U.D. and Voorwaarts Leerdam.

== International career ==
Bouman made his debut for the Netherlands in a June 1912 Summer Olympics match against Austria and earned a total of 9 caps, scoring no goals. His final international was a May 1914 friendly match against Denmark. He won the bronze medal with the Dutch at the 1912 Summer Olympics football tournament.

== Personal life ==
He worked as a civil servant for the Zwolle, Deventer and Leerdam municipalities.
