= Sumar, Netherlands =

Sumar Suameer
- Village
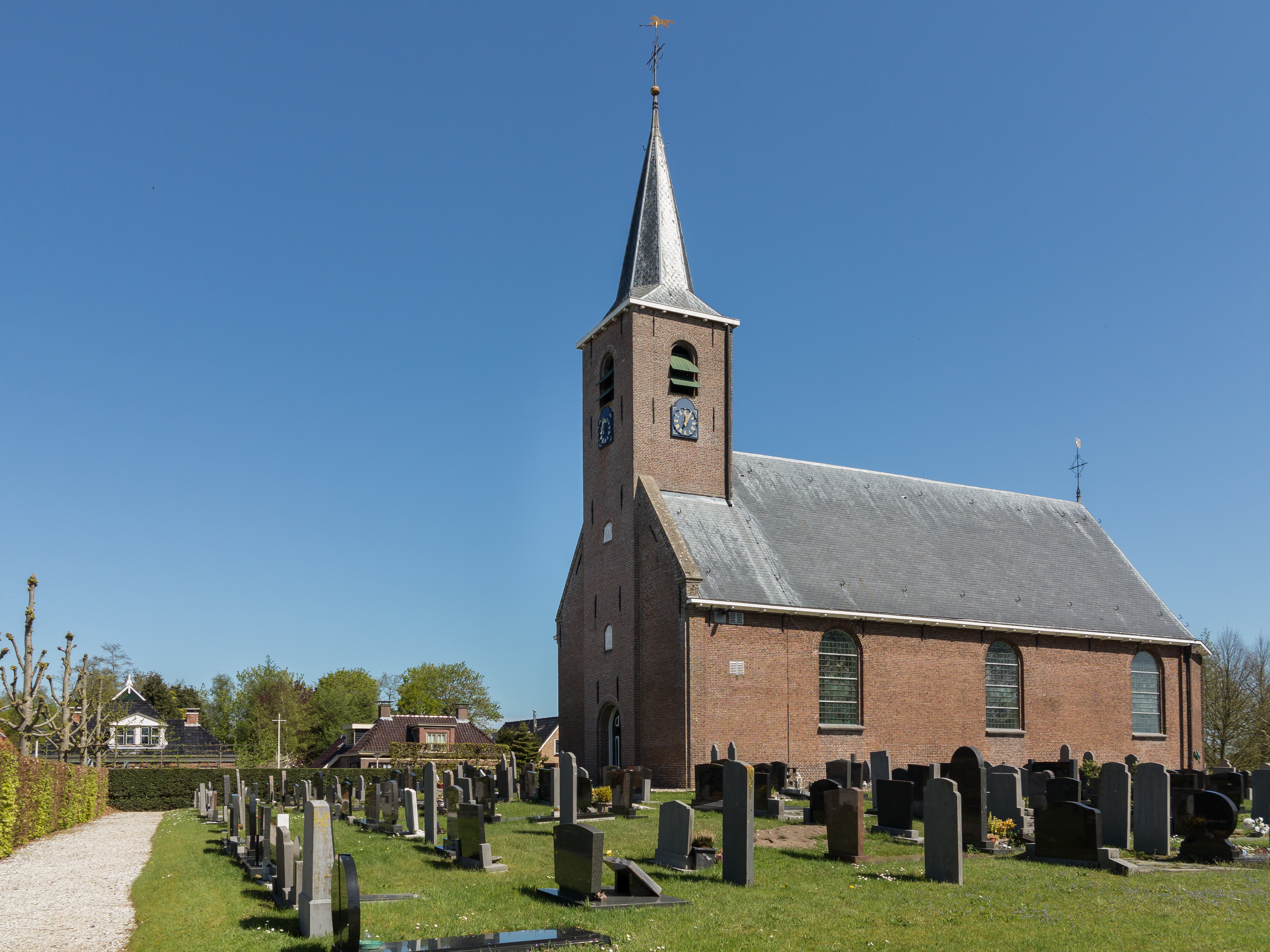
- Sumar, church: de Dorpskerk

- Flag Coat of arms

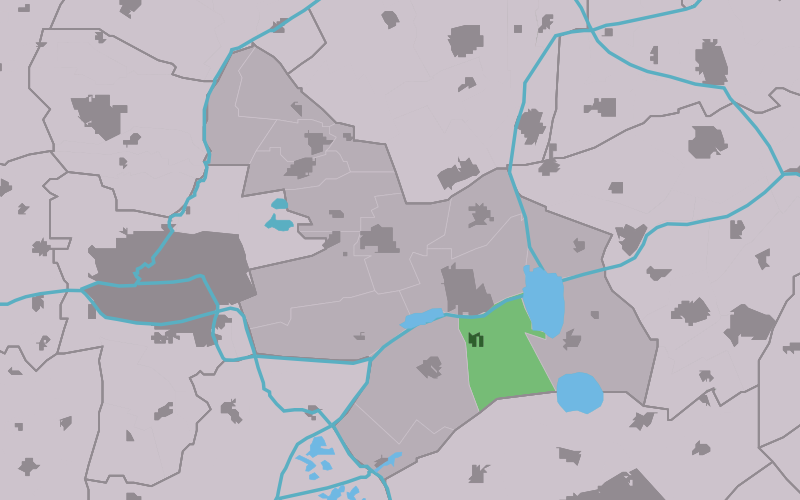
- Location of the village in Tytsjerksteradiel

- Location in the Netherlands Sumar (Netherlands)
- Country: Netherlands
- Province: Friesland
- Municipality: Tytsjerksteradiel

Area
  - Total: 11.69 km^{2} (4.51 sq mi)
- Elevation: 1.2 m (3.9 ft)

Population (2021)
  - Total: 1,355
  - Density: 115.9/km^{2} (300.2/sq mi)
- Time zone: UTC+1 (CET)
  - Summer (DST): UTC+2 (CEST)
- Postal code: 9262
- Dialing code: 0511

Sumar (Dutch: Suameer) is a village in the municipality of Tytsjerksteradiel, in the province of Friesland, the Netherlands. It lies south of Burgum, on the N356, and had a population of approximately 1,382 in January 2017.

There is a windmill in the village, De Hoop.

== History ==
The village was first mentioned in 1453 as suwamer, and means "southern lake". Su (south) was added to distinguish between Eastermar and Noordermeer. Sumar developed in the late middle ages as a collection of spread out farms around the church. The Dutch Reformed church was built in 1769 as a replacement of an earlier church.

Sumar was home to 457 people in 1840. Around 1900, the heath in the area was cultivated. The dairy factory De Harste was built 1908 and is a combination of rational and Jugendstil architecture. The north of the village near the Prinses Margriet Canal started to industrialize.

The school teacher Kornelis Lieuwes de Vries developed the Bintje potato in 1898 which became one of the most popular potato varieties. The potato was named after the 17-year old Bintje Jansma, one of his students, in 1905.

== Gallery ==
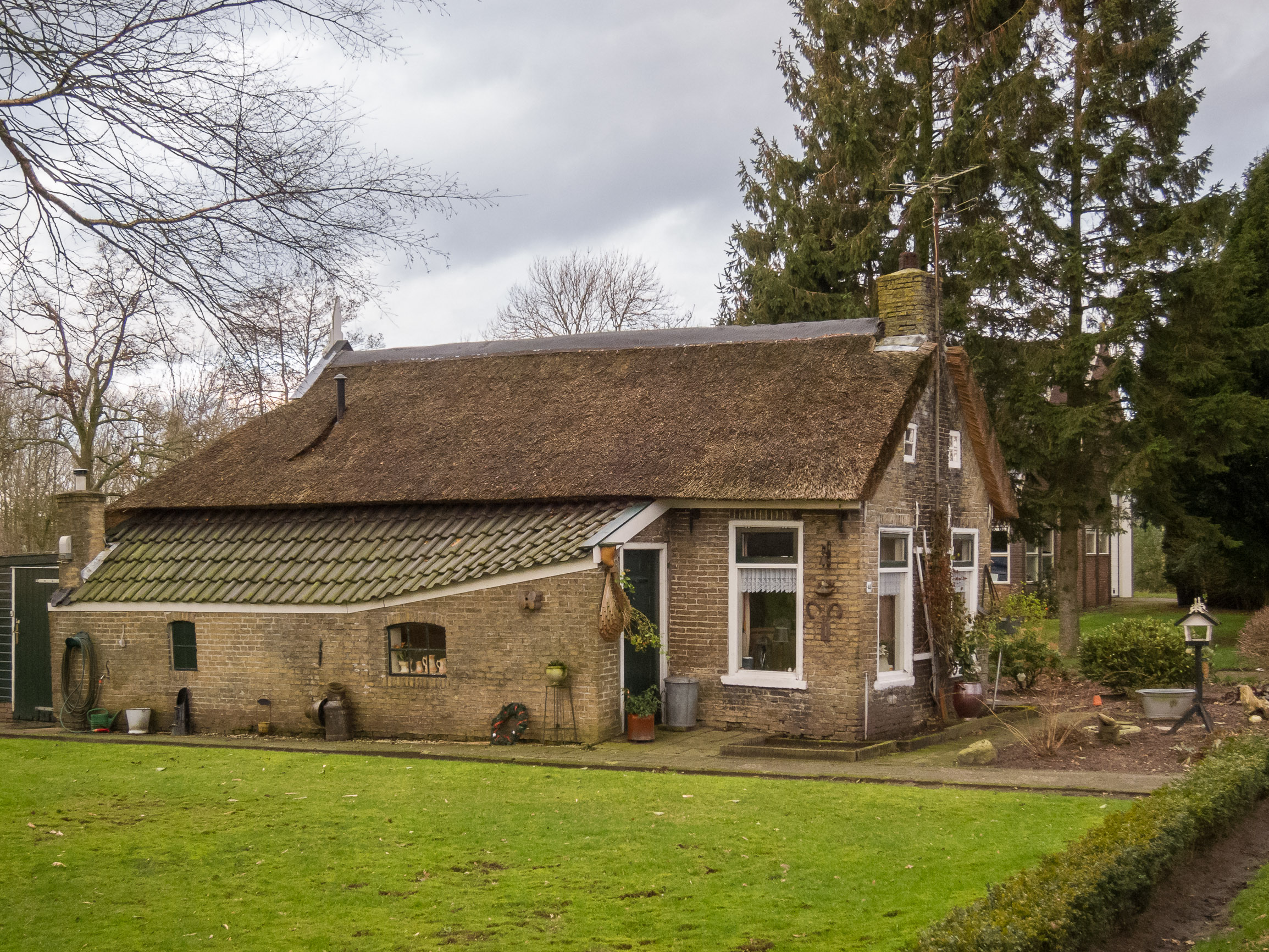
House in Sumar

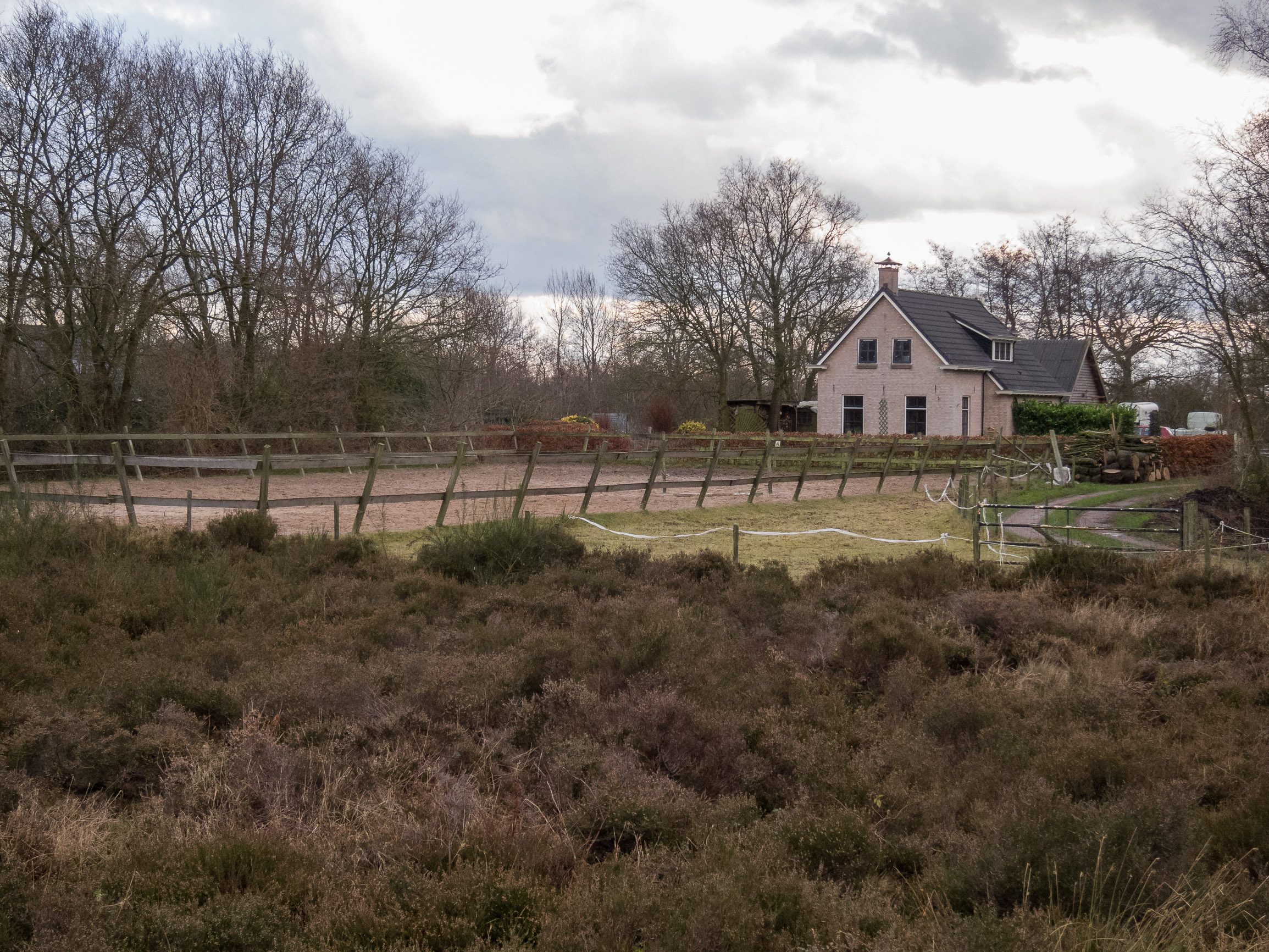
House on the heath

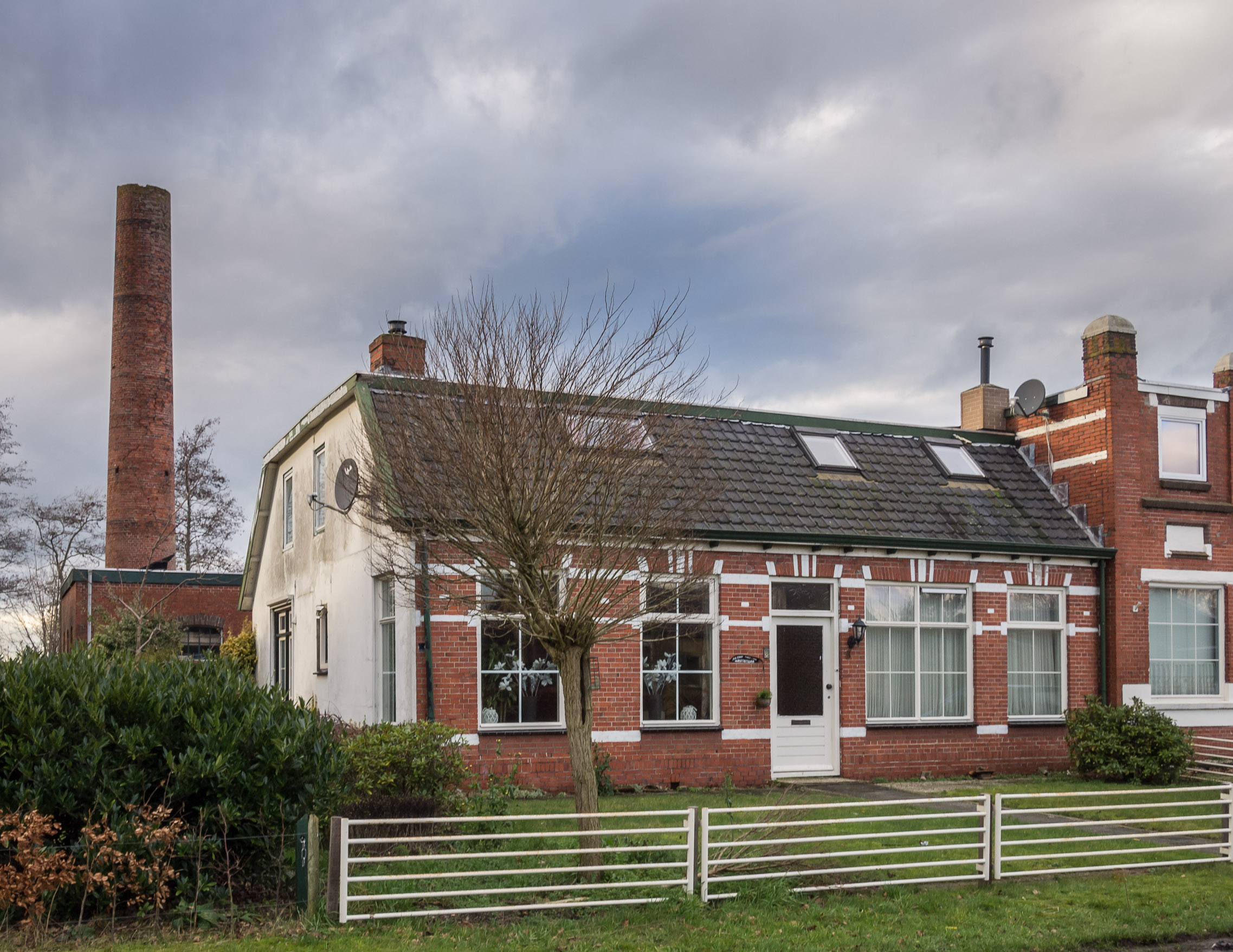
Former dairy factory

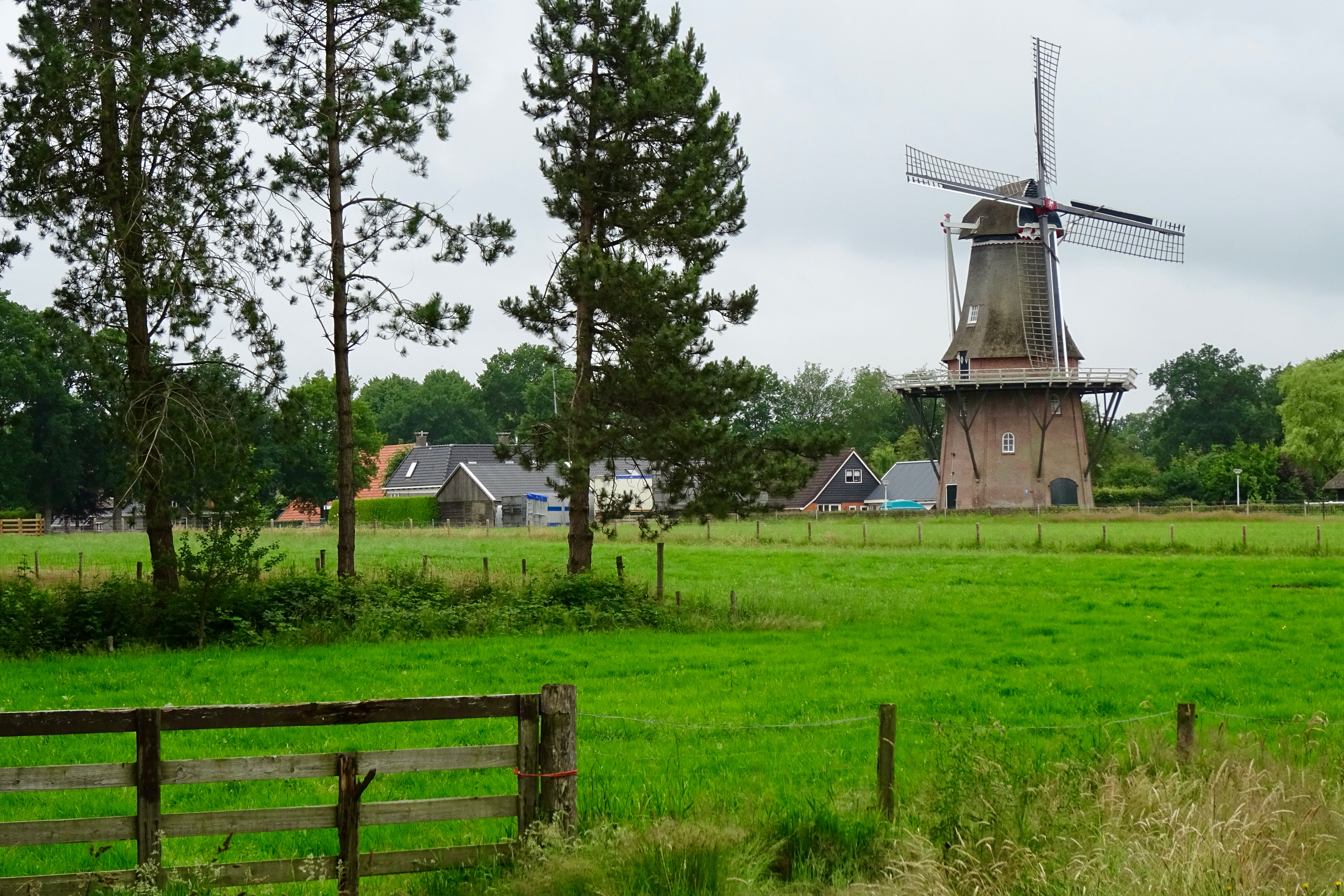
Windmill De Hoop
