= Swarteweisein =

Swarteweisein Zwartewegsend
- Hamlet
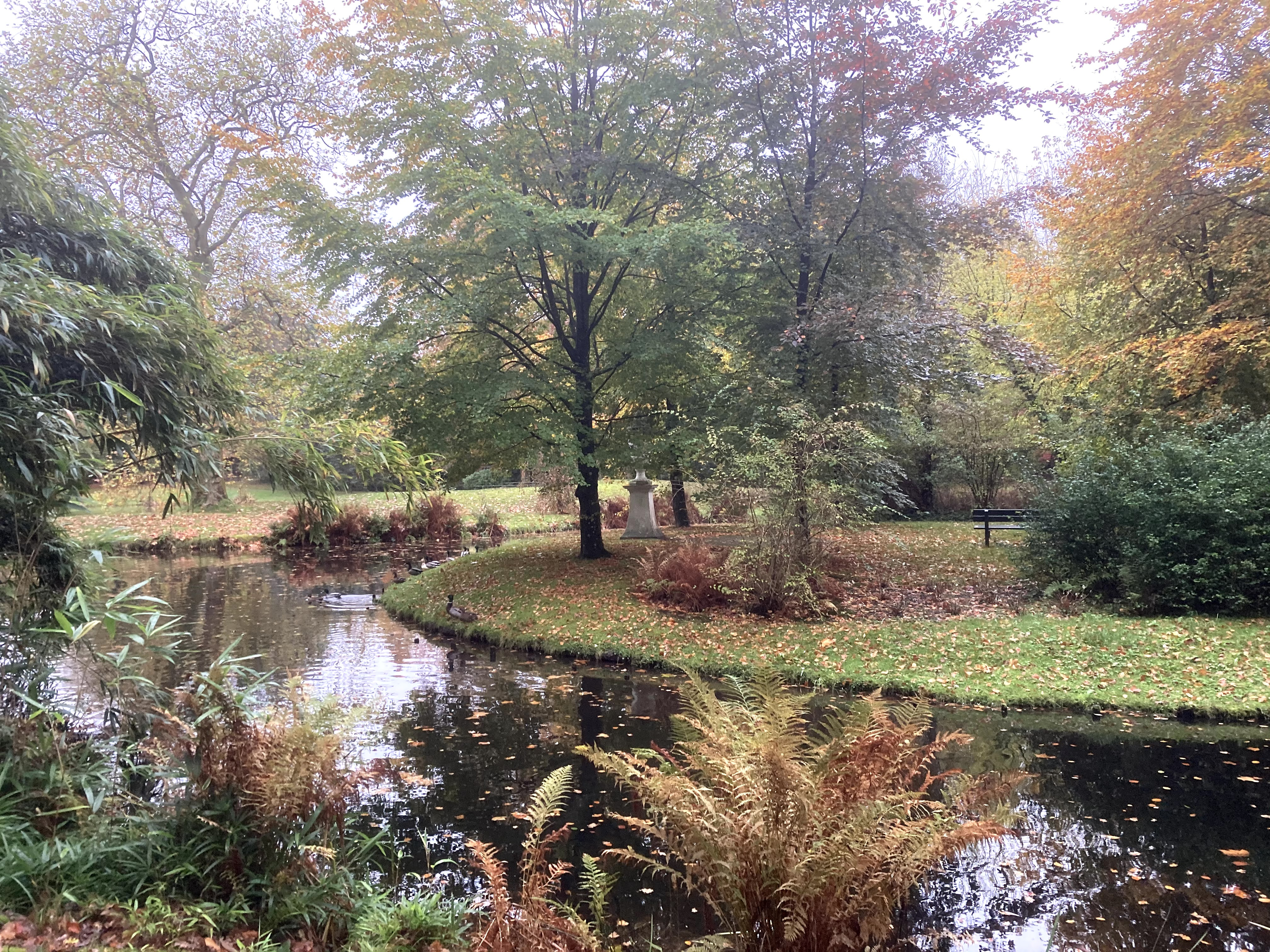
- Groot Vijversburg

- Location in the Netherlands Swarteweisein (Netherlands)
- Coordinates: 53.2175°N 5.9086°E
- Country: Netherlands
- Province: Friesland
- Municipality: Tytsjerksteradiel
- Time zone: UTC+1 (CET)
  - Summer (DST): UTC+2 (CEST)
- Postal code: 9061
- Dialing code: 058

Swarteweisein (Dutch: Zwartewegsend) is a hamlet in Tytsjerksteradiel in the province of Friesland, the Netherlands.

Swarteweisein is not a statistical entity, and the postal authorities have placed it under Tytsjerk.

The hamlet was first mentioned in 1847 as Zwartewegsend, and means "end of the black road" which was the road built from Leeuwarden to Groningen which ended at the location until 1531–1533. An inn was located at the location with that name. The hamlet contains Groot Vijversburg and the Huis met twintig kamertjes (House with twenty rooms) which were twenty little houses for the poor, and are still inhabited.
