= Sânhuzen, Tytsjerksteradiel =

Sânhuzen Zevenhuizen
- Hamlet
- Location in the Netherlands Sânhuzen (Netherlands)
- Coordinates: 53°15′30″N 5°54′30″E
- Country: Netherlands
- Province: Friesland
- Municipality: Tytsjerksteradiel
- Time zone: UTC+1 (CET)
  - Summer (DST): UTC+2 (CEST)
- Postal code: 9064
- Dialing code: 058

Sânhuzen (Dutch: Zevenhuizen) is a hamlet in the north of the Netherlands. It is located in Tytsjerksteradiel, Friesland.

Sânhuzen is not a statistical entity, and the postal authorities have placed it under Aldtsjerk. It has no place name signs and consists of about 15 houses.
