= Noardburgum =

Noardburgum Noordbergum
- Village
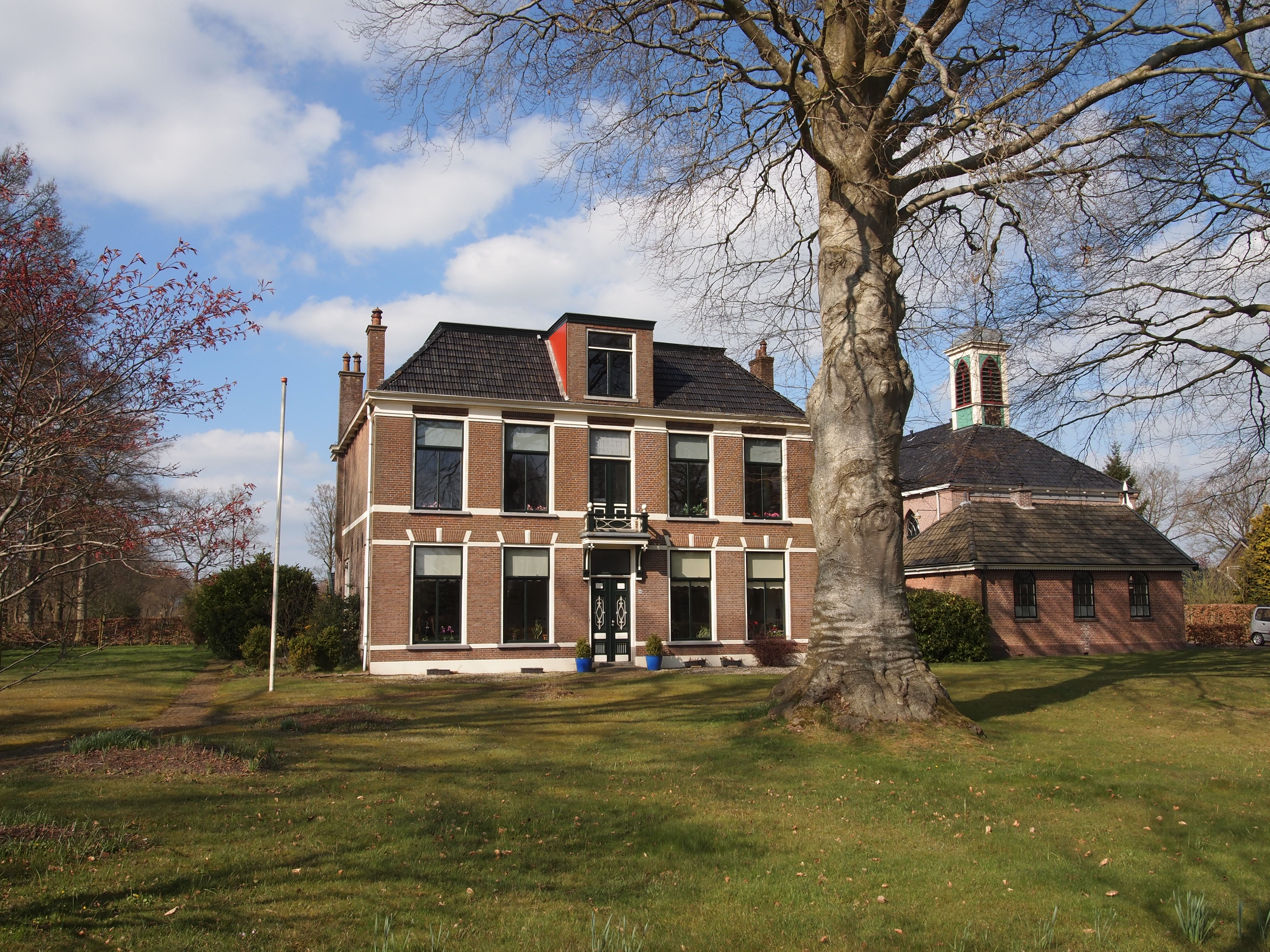
- Noardburgum Church

- Flag Coat of arms

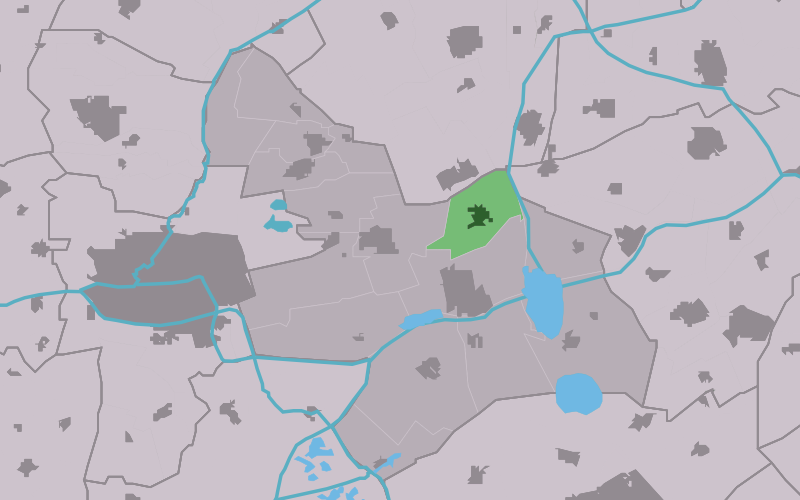
- Location of the village in Tytsjerksteradiel

- Location in the Netherlands Noardburgum (Netherlands)
- Country: Netherlands
- Province: Friesland
- Municipality: Tytsjerksteradiel

Area
  - Total: 8.08 km^{2} (3.12 sq mi)
- Elevation: 1.1 m (3.6 ft)

Population (2021)
  - Total: 2,305
  - Density: 285/km^{2} (739/sq mi)
- Time zone: UTC+1 (CET)
  - Summer (DST): UTC+2 (CEST)
- Postal code: 9257
- Dialing code: 0511

Noardburgum (Dutch: Noordbergum) is a village in Tytsjerksteradiel municipality in the Friesland province of the Netherlands. It had a population of around 2,250 in January 2017.

== History ==
The village was first mentioned in 1718 as Bergumer heide. The current name means north of Burgum. Noardburgum developed in the 19th century as a heath cultivation project of Nicolaas Ypey.

The Protestant church was built between 1849 and 1850. The poorhouse was built in 1843, and is currently houses a clog museum.

A large complex for drinking water extraction in the region was constructed in the 1920s. In 1984, a decalcification unit was added to terrain. Noardburgum was awarded village status in 1930.

== Gallery ==
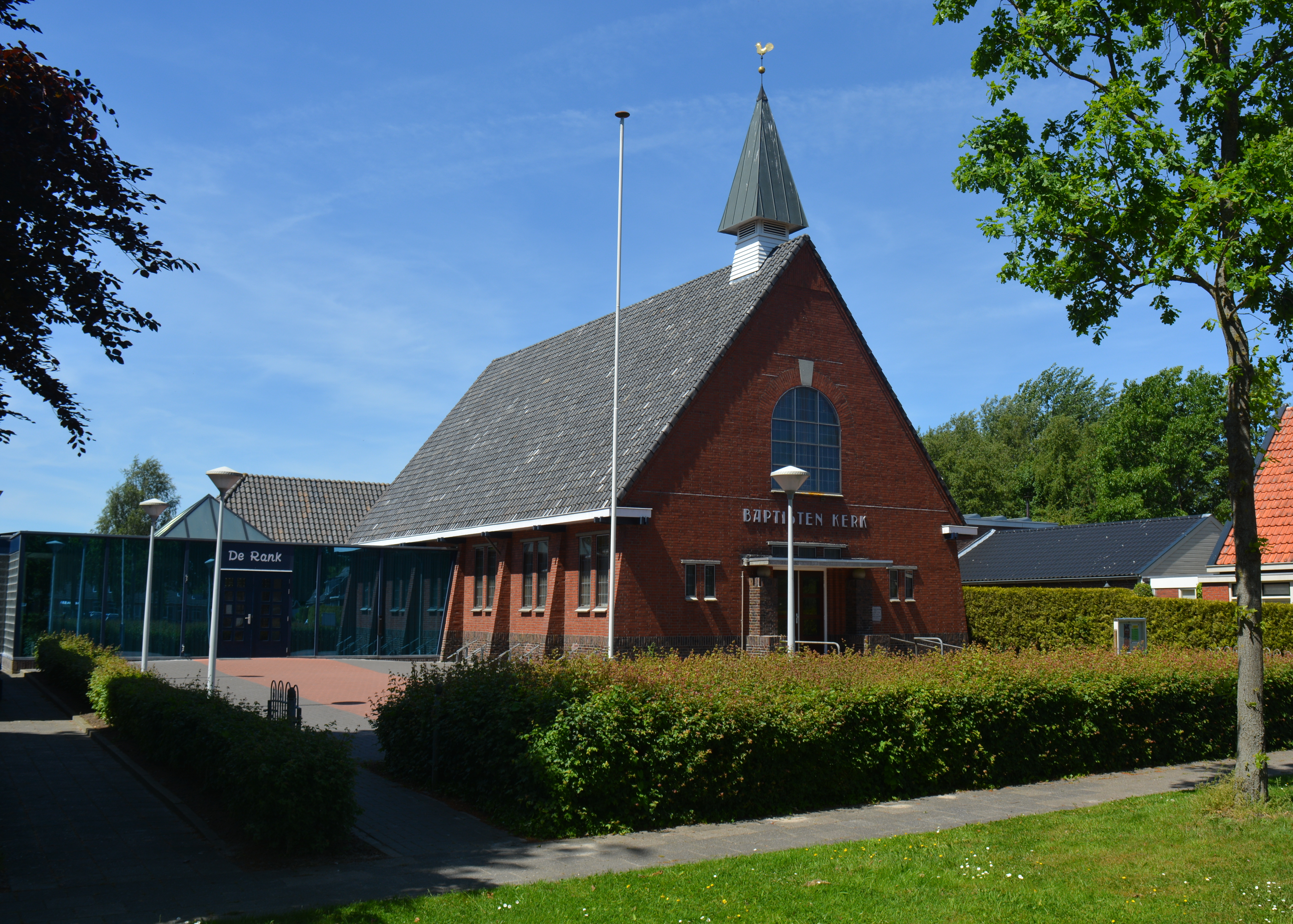
Mennonite church

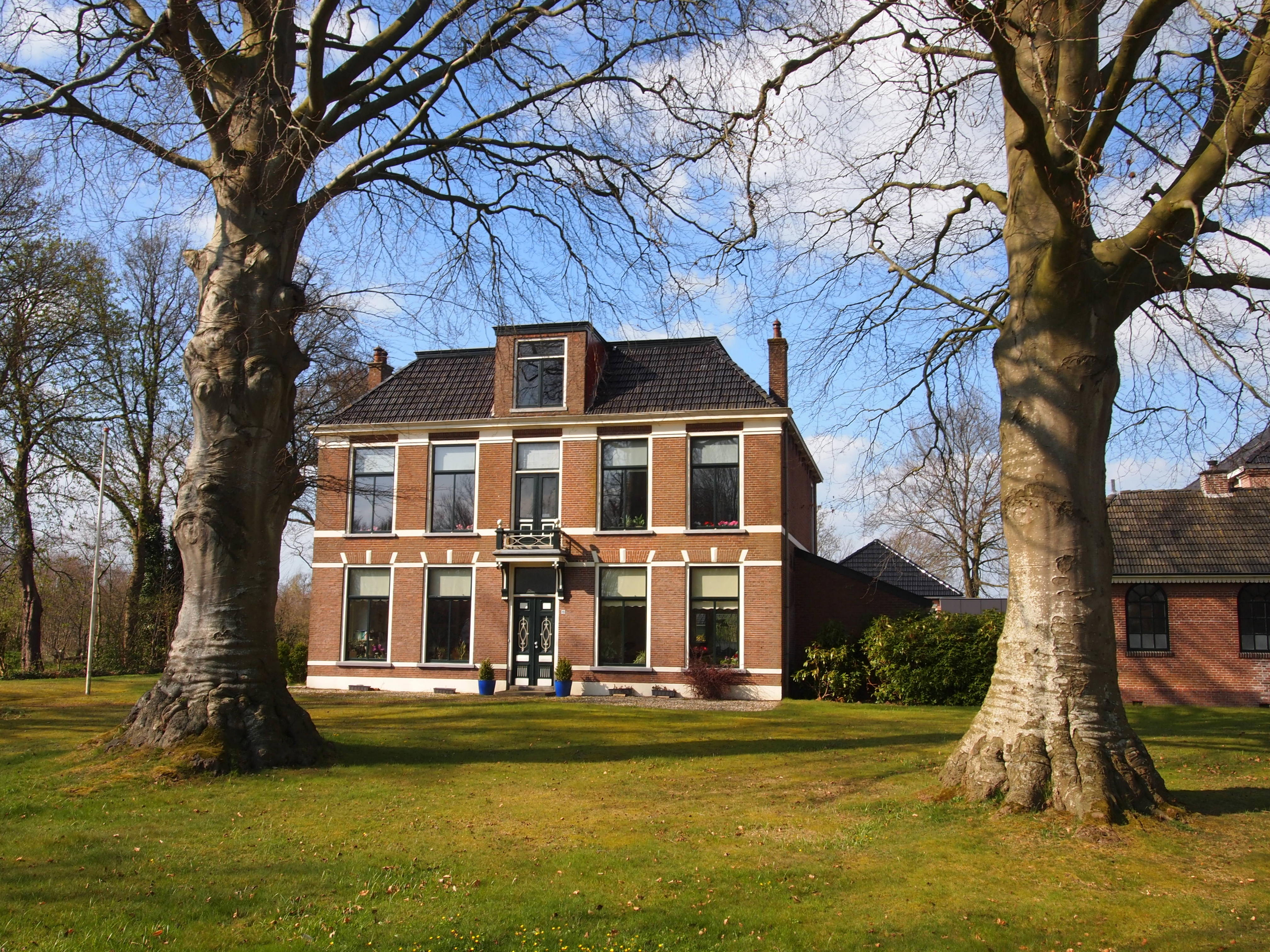
Clergy house of the Protestant church

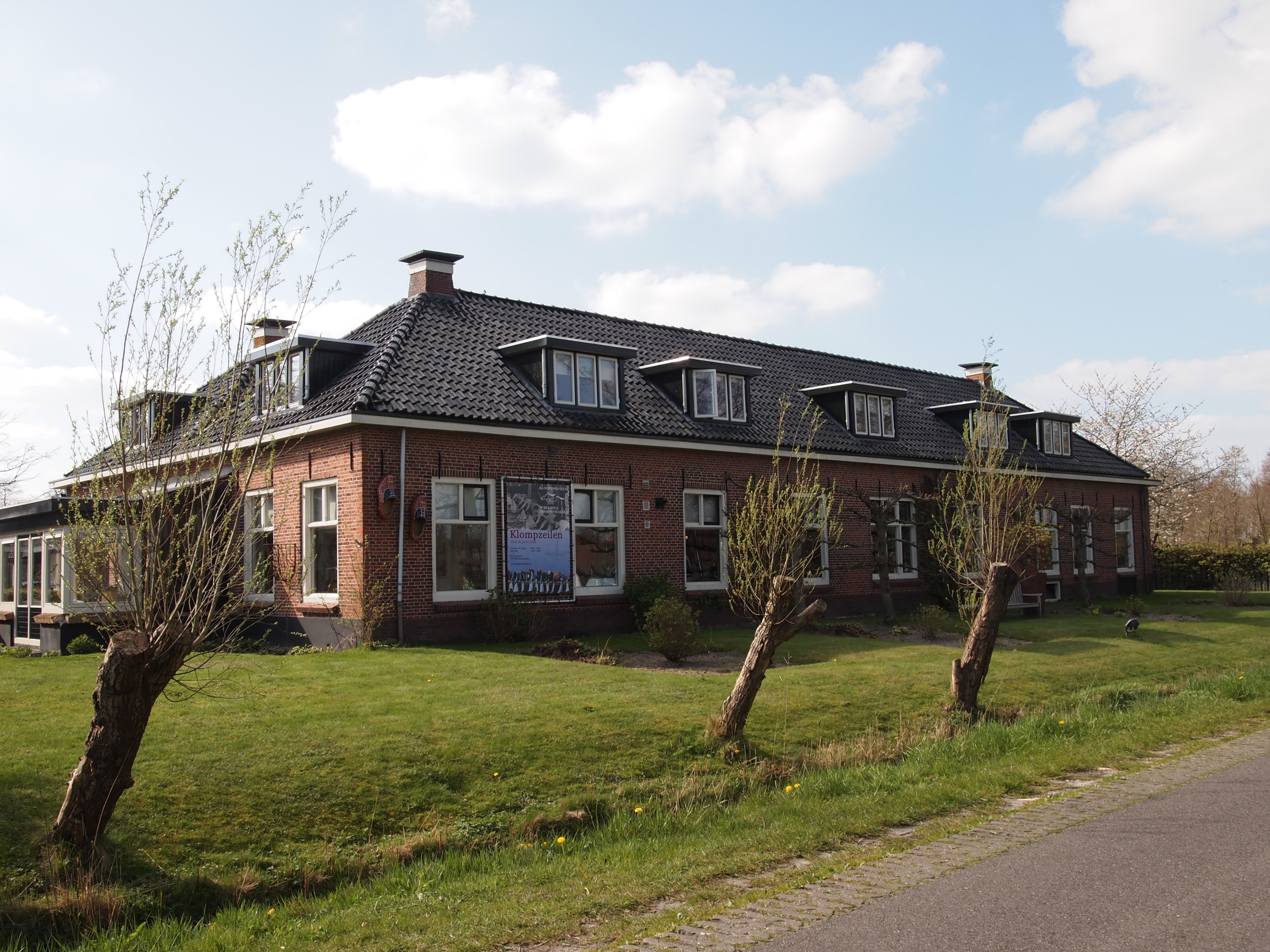
Clog museum in the former poorhouse

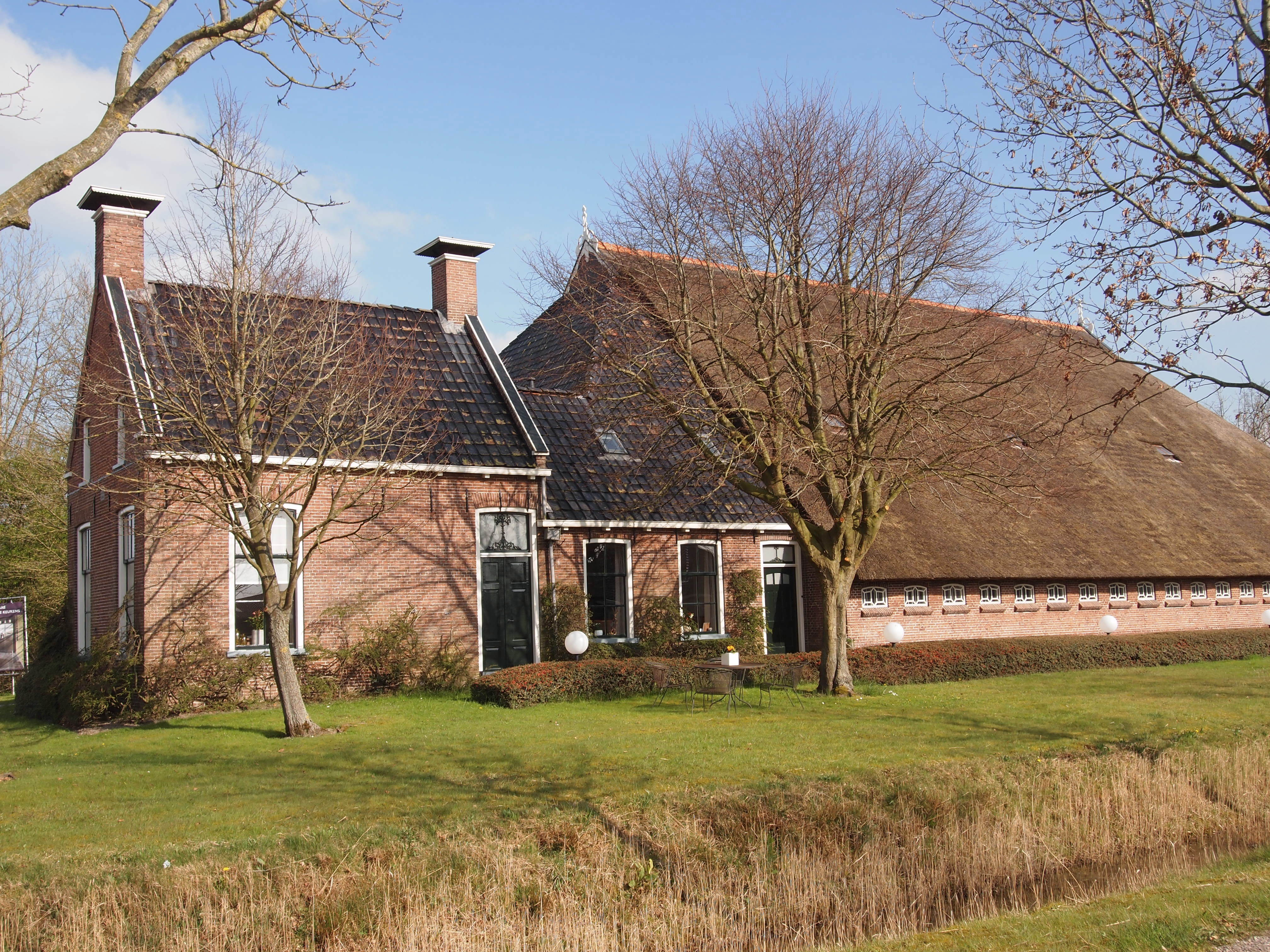
Farm in Noardburgum
