= Garyp =

Garyp Garijp
- Village
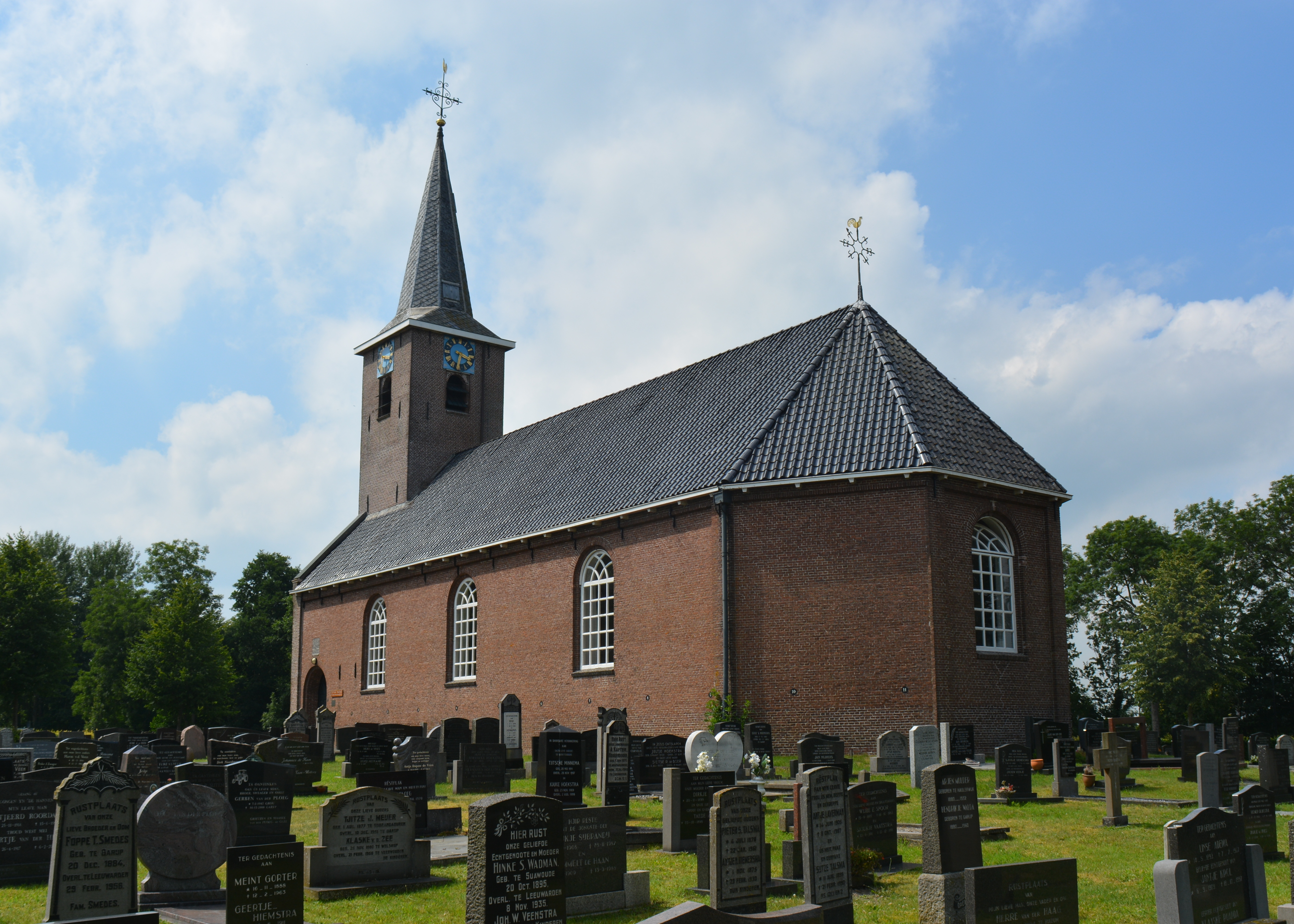
- St Peter's Church

- Coat of arms

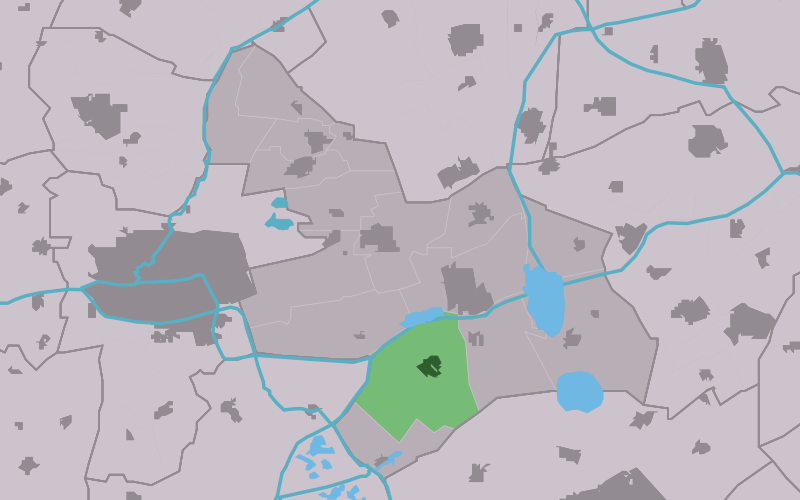
- Location of the village in Tytsjerksteradiel

- Location in the Netherlands Garyp (Netherlands)
- Country: Netherlands
- Province: Friesland
- Municipality: Tytsjerksteradiel

Area
  - Total: 18.26 km^{2} (7.05 sq mi)
- Elevation: −0.1 m (−0.33 ft)

Population (2021)
  - Total: 1,895
  - Density: 103.8/km^{2} (268.8/sq mi)
- Time zone: UTC+1 (CET)
  - Summer (DST): UTC+2 (CEST)
- Postal code: 9263
- Dialing code: 0511

Garyp (Dutch: Garijp) is a village in the municipality of Tytsjerksteradiel within the province of Friesland, Netherlands. It had a population of around 1,894 in January 2017.

== History ==
The village was first mentioned between 1325 and 1336 as Garipe and means "village of the river bank". Garyp developed into a stretched-out village on a sandy ridge. The current Dutch Reformed church dates from 1838; however, the first church was built around 1100. Around 1930, the peat in the region was excavated.

Garyp was home to 620 people in 1840.

== Gallery ==
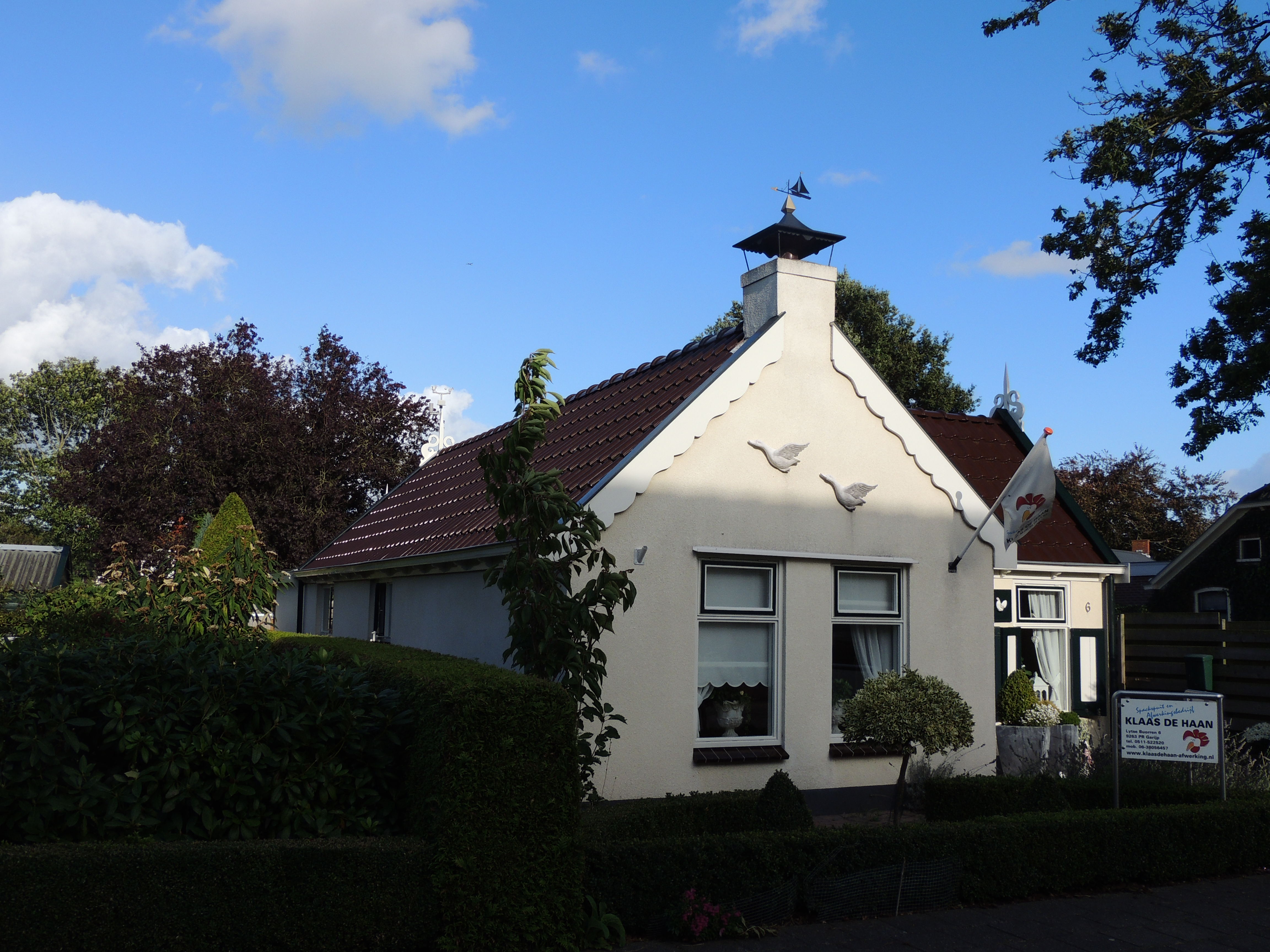
Village view

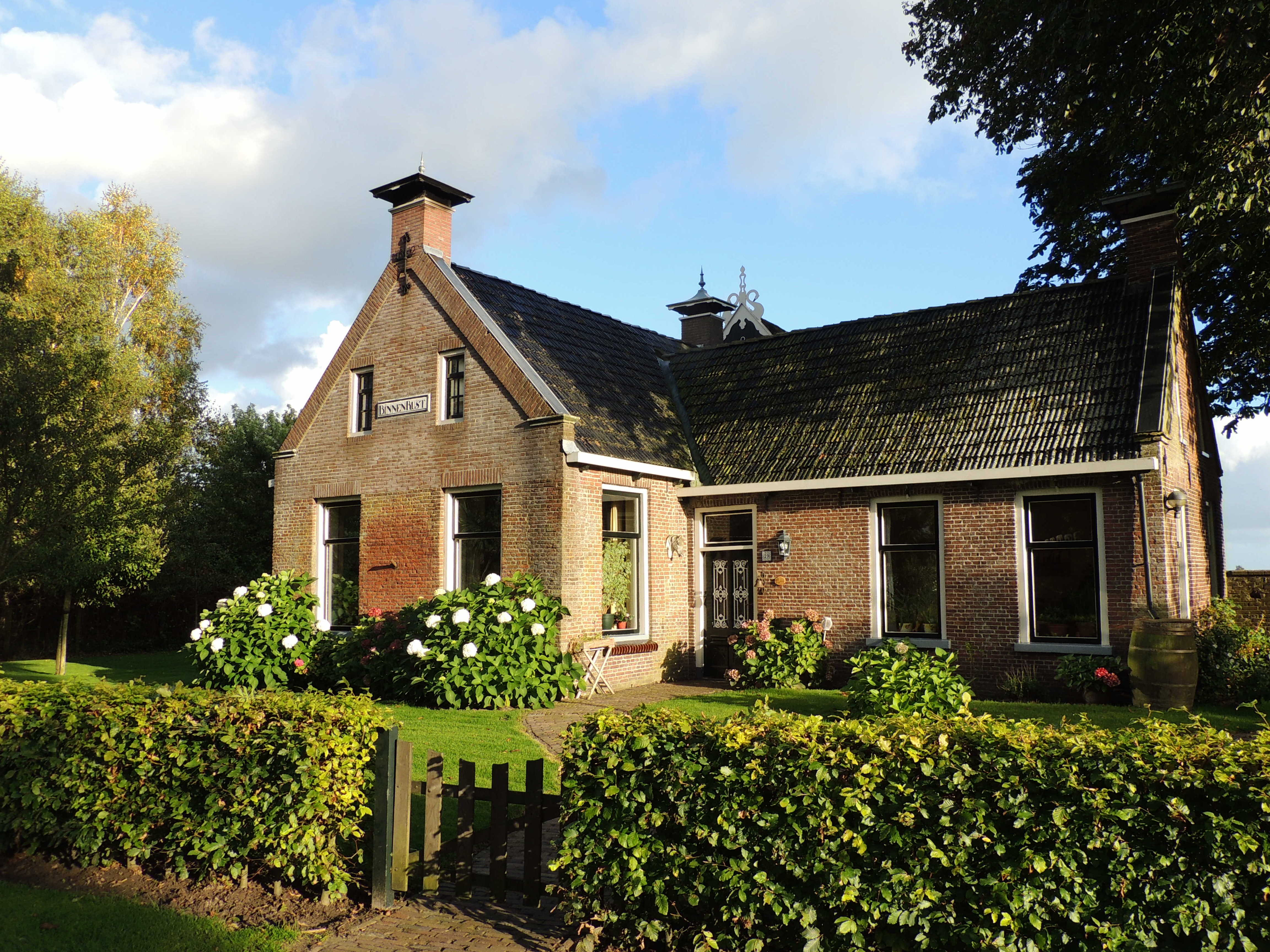
Farm Binnenrust

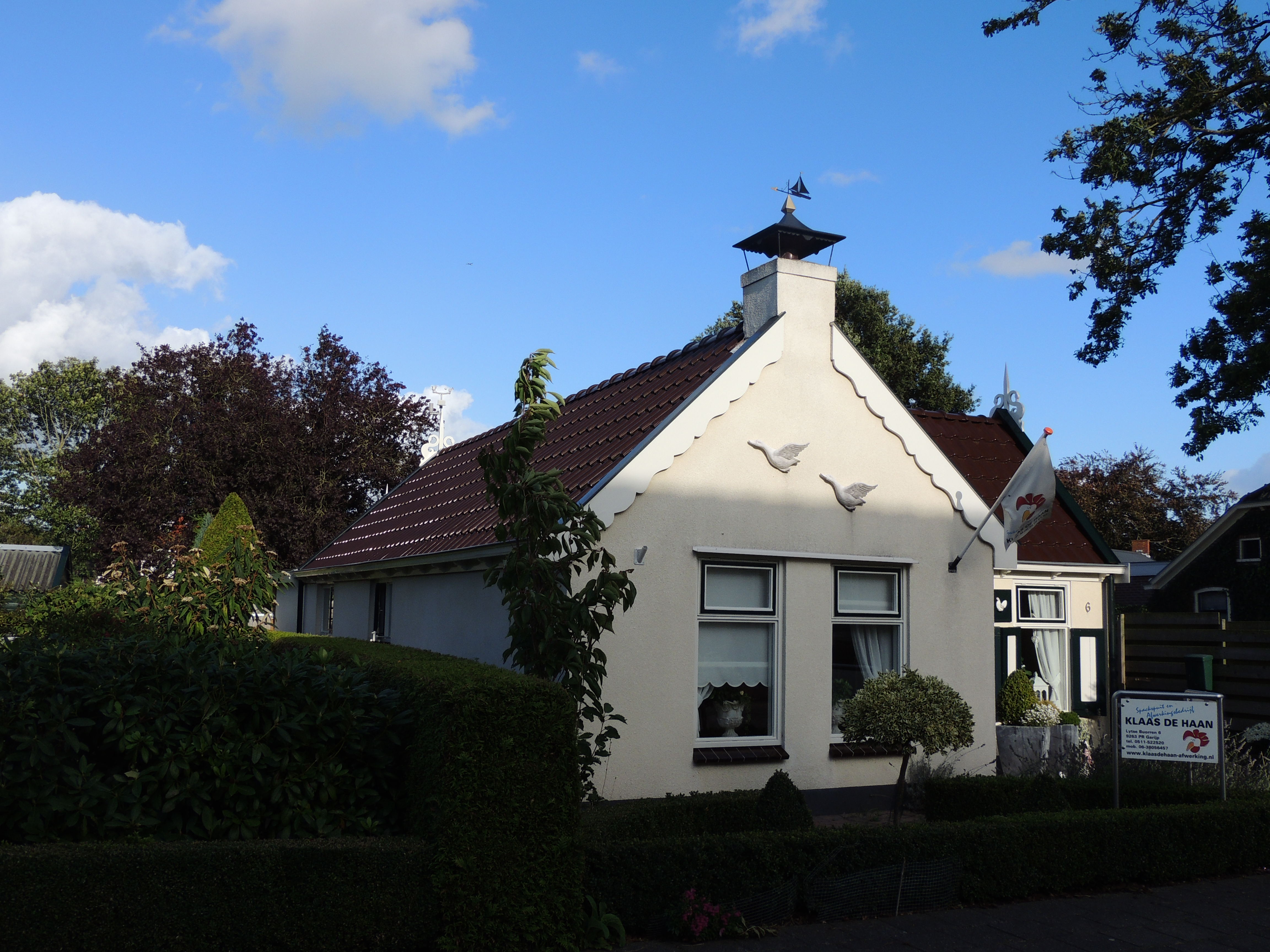
House in Garyp

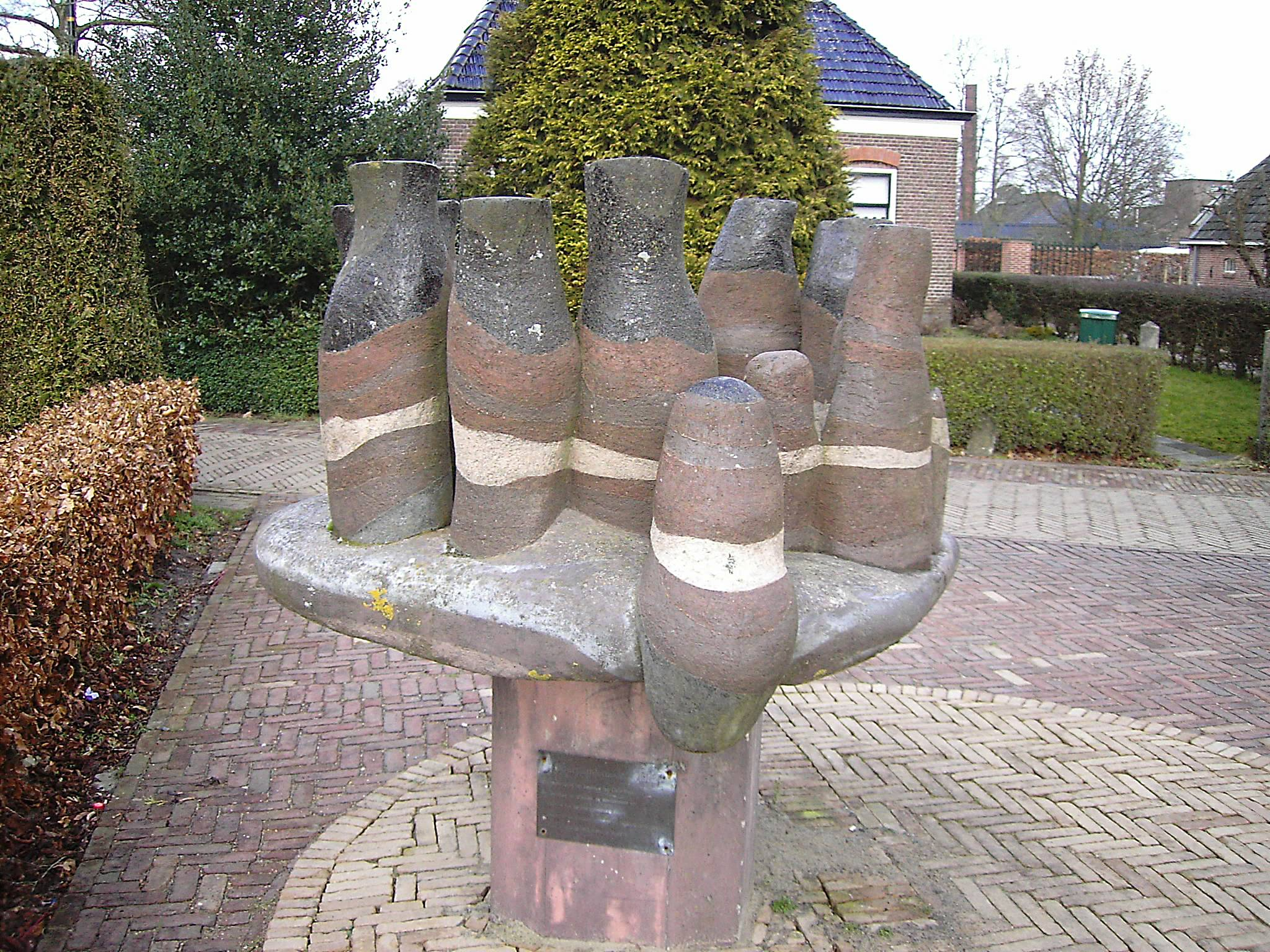
Village community statue
