= Van Huysum =

Dutch surname, painting family

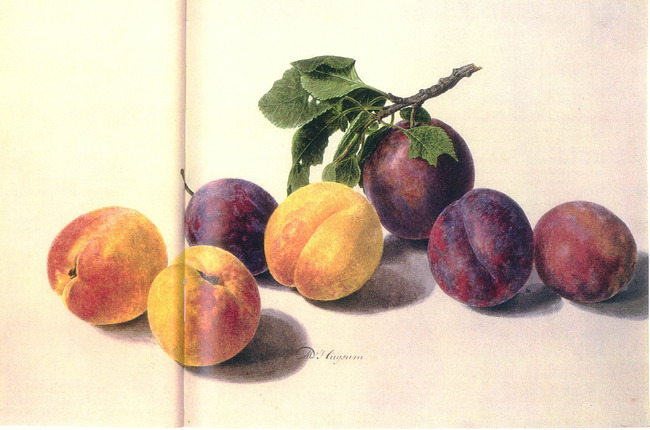
Apricots and plums (Abrikozen en pruimen), watercolor by Michiel van Huysum, date unknown

Van Huysum (also spelled van Huijsum) is a surname from the Netherlands, meaning "of/from Huizum," a district of Leiden, South Holland.

Four generations of van Huysums were visual artists of the Dutch Golden Age of the 17th and 18th centuries. Jan van Huysum is the most important figure of the family. "Some degree of confusion exists between works of Justus I and II, and Jacob and Jan van Huysum, to whom a vast number of works by others have also been wrongly attributed."

- Jan van Huysum the Elder (d. 1664), "painter, schoolmaster, government appointee"
  - Caspar van Huysum (b. 1648), painter and printmaker in Leeuwarden
  - Justus van Huysum (1659–1718), he married twice and had 12 children in all, five with his first wife Margarietje Schouten (1660–1689) and seven with his second Elisabeth Sanderus (1663–1710)
    - Jan van Huysum (1682–1749), oldest of Justus' children with Schouten
      - Francina Margaretha van Huysum, (1707–1789), Jan's daughter with his wife Elisabeth Takens (1680–1751)
    - Justus van Huysum the Younger (1684–1706), Justus' son by Schouten
    - Jacob van Huysum (1688–1740), Justus' son by Schouten
    - Maria van Huysum (1696–after 1760), painter and drafter, Justus' daughter by second wife Elisabeth Sanderus
    - Josua van Huysum (1699–1728), painter in other genres, Justus' son by second wife Sanderus
    - Michiel van Huysum (1703–1777), painter of fruit and flower still life paintings, and Arcadian landscapes, Justus' son by second wife Sanderus, may have studied with his older half-brother Jan
