= Himriksmole =

Windmill in Leeuwarden, Netherlands

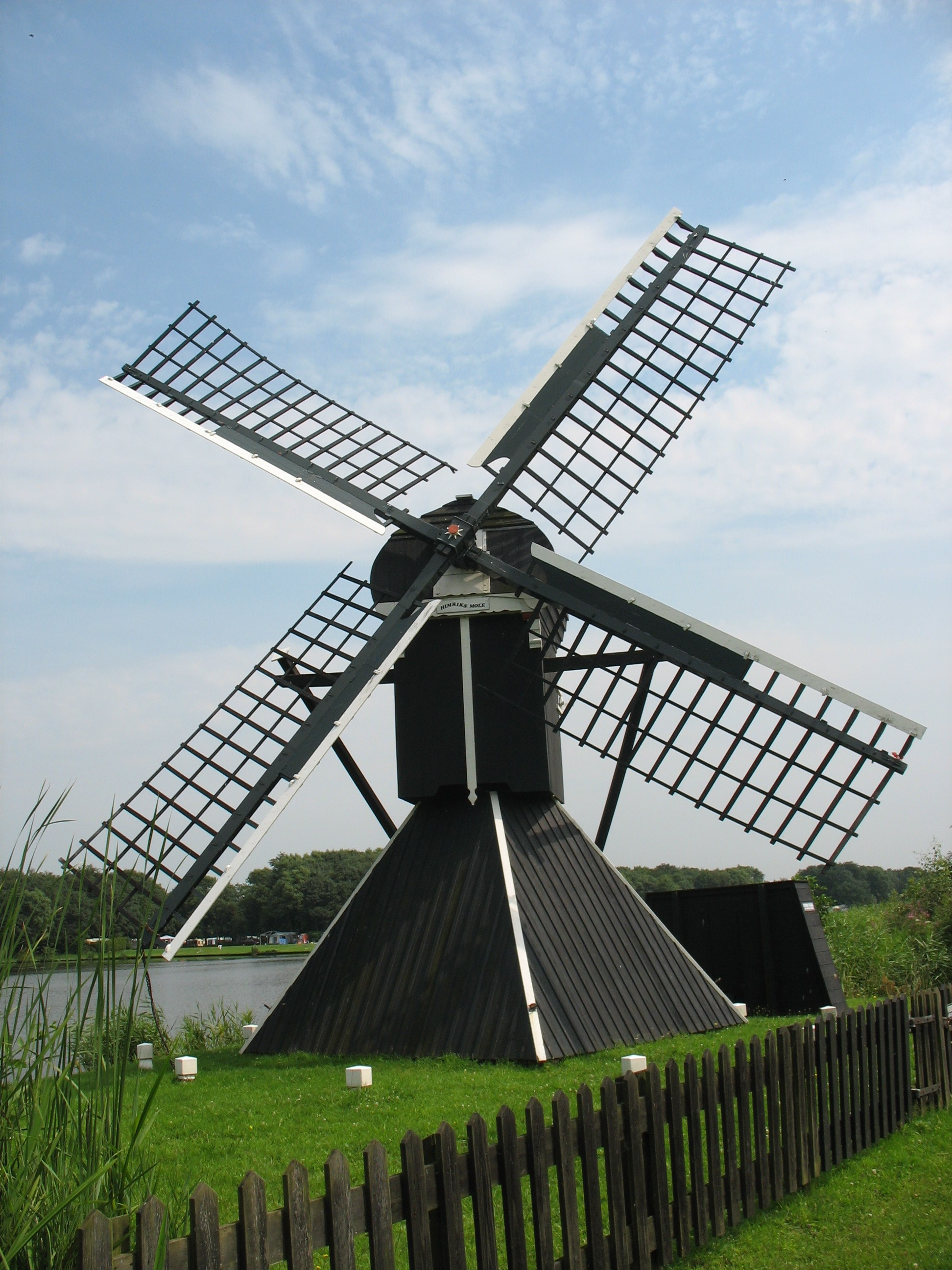
- Himriksmole in 2008
- Interactive map of Himriksmole

Origin
- Mill name: Himriksmole
- Mill location: Recreational area between Leeuwarden and Tytsjerk
- Coordinates: 53°12′43″N 5°53′7″E
- Operator: Gemeente Leeuwarden
- Year built: ca 1860, rebuild 1996

Information
- Purpose: Drainage mill
- Type: Hollow post
- Roundhouse storeys: Single storey roundhouse
- No. of sails: Four sails
- Type of sails: Common sails
- Windshaft: Wood
- Winding: Tailpole and winch
- Type of pump: Archimedes' screw

The Himriksmole, also known as Groene Ster after the recreational area and nature reserve where it is located, is a drainage mill near the village of Tytsjerk, Friesland, Netherlands. It is a hollow post windmill of the type called spinnenkop by the Dutch. The mill is listed as a Rijksmonument, number 35675, and is used to raise the water level in the nature reserve.

== History ==
The mill was originally built for draining the Hemrikspolder near Huizum, with parts of an eighteenth-century mill from Wergea being used in its construction. It was replaced by an electric pumping station and moved in 1952 to Rijperkerk and in 1977 to its current location, where it was put to a new use, supplying water to the nature reserve. The mill was destroyed by arson in 1995 but rebuilt the following year.

== Description ==
The Himriksmole is what the Dutch describe as a spinnenkop (English: spiderhead mill). It is a small hollow post mill wound by a winch. The four common sails have a span of 11 metres (36 ft 1 in) and are carried on a cast-iron windshaft. The brake wheel on the windshaft drives the wallower at the top of the upright shaft in the body (on a spinnenkop called the head), which passes through the main post into the substructure. At the bottom of this shaft, a pair of crown wheels drive the scoop wheel axle. The scoop wheel itself is located outside the mill. The Himriksmole is the only drainage mill with a scoop wheel in Friesland; other Frisian drainage mills use an Archimedes' screw. The head and substructure are weatherboarded.

== Public access ==
The mill is easily reached from the public footpath running past the mill.
