= Justus van Huysum =

Dutch Golden Age painter

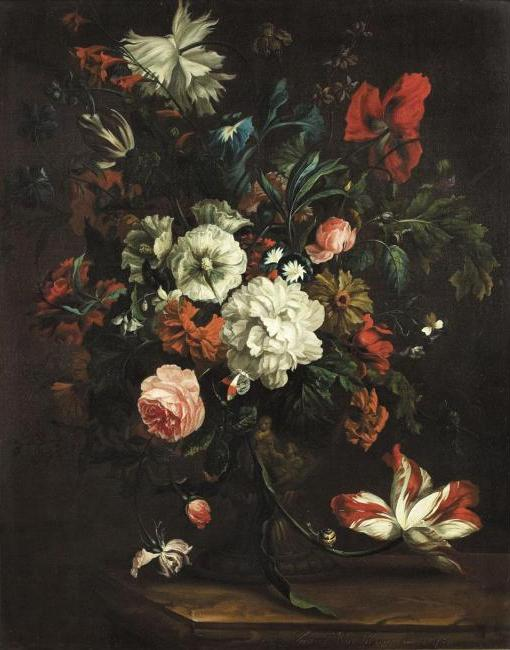
- Flowers in a vase on a stone slab, 1693
- Born: July 8, 1659; Amsterdam
- Died: April 23, 1716 (aged 56); Amsterdam
- Known for: Painting

Justus van Huysum, also spelled Huijsum, (July 8, 1659 in Amsterdam – April 23, 1716 in Amsterdam) was a Dutch Golden Age painter.

== Biography ==
Justus Van Huysum is the son of the decorative painter Jan van Huysum the Elder, who moved to Amsterdam from Huizum (near Leeuwarden, Friesland) between 1654 and 1657, where his boys Justus and Caspar Van Huysum, an engraver in adulthood, were born. Other sources says Justus’ father was a schoolteacher.

According to biographer of Dutch painters Arnold Houbraken, when Justus turned 16, his father sent him to learn painting from Nicolaes Berchem in 1675. Houbraken said he was very good at all sorts of painting, but excelled at flower painting, and founded a family business in painting flowers in vases. Another source says Justus “decorated rooms in many houses in Holland, and was assisted by his three sons.” He painted a wide variety of subjects and styles including portraits, landscapes, seascapes, and flowers, “and the versatility of his talent rendered him successful in all.” Justus’ flower paintings are described as having a “certain harshness” compared to his son Jan’s.

A picture by Justus is preserved in “the gallery of Brunswick” [likely Herzog Anton Ulrich Museum] representing "Orpheus and the Beasts in a wooded landscape", and here we have some explanation of his son Jan's fondness for landscapes of a conventional and Arcadian kind.

He married twice. He was the father of Jan van Huysum, Jacob van Huysum, Justus van Huysum the Younger (c. 1684–1706), a battle painter, by his first wife. His children by his second wife include the painters Josua van Huysum, Maria van Huysum, and Michiel van Huysum (~1704–after 1760).
