= Thomas Fairchild =

Thomas Fairchild may refer to:

- Thomas E. Fairchild (1912–2007), US federal judge and politician
- Thomas Fairchild (gardener) (1667–1729), English gardener
