= Jan van Huysum =

Dutch still-life painter (1682–1749)

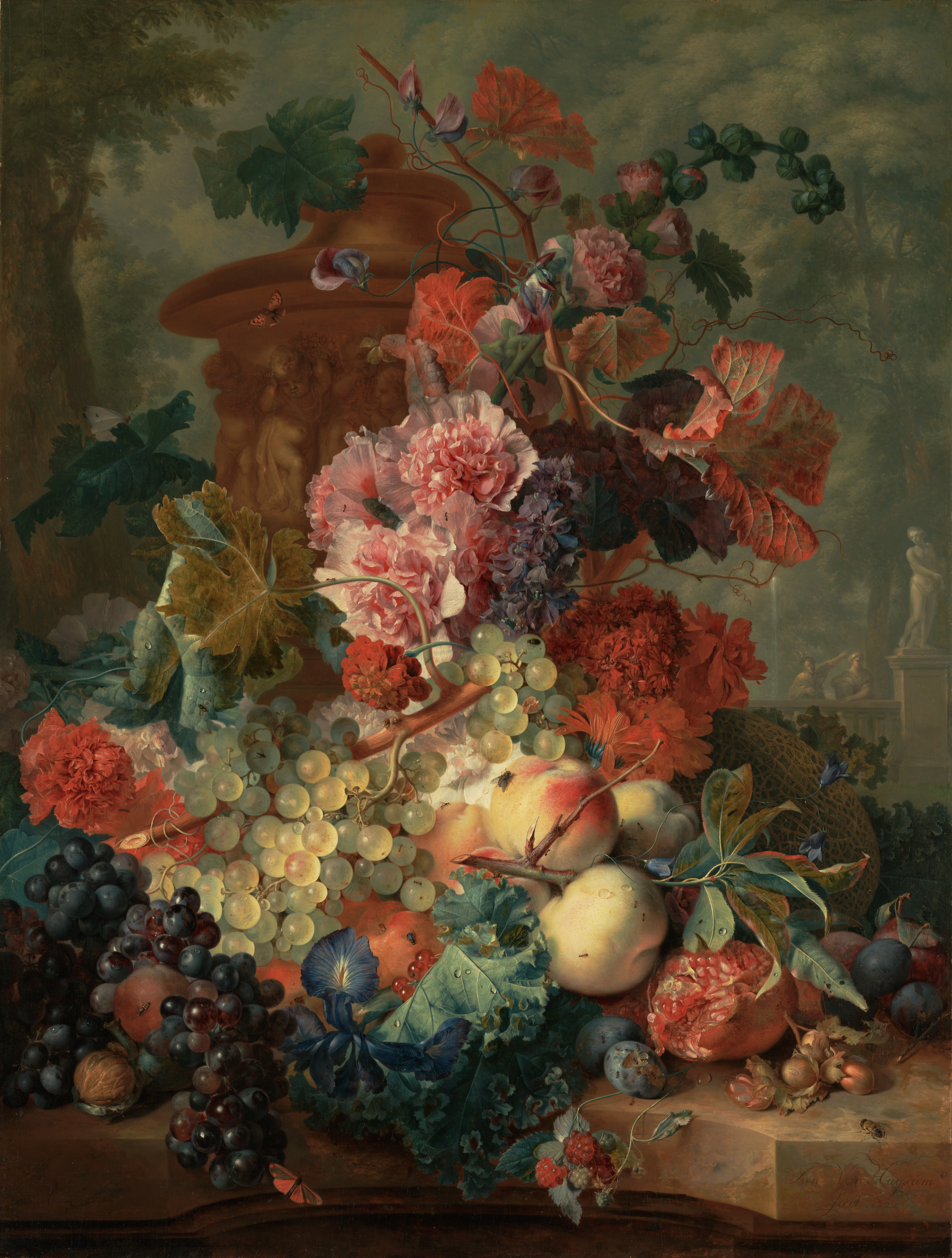
- Fruit and flowers, 1722
- Born: 15 April 1682; Amsterdam
- Died: 8 February 1749 (aged 66); Amsterdam
- Known for: Painting

Jan van Huysum (or Jan van Huijsum) (15 April 1682 – 8 February 1749) is the most notable member of the Van Huysum family of artists working in Dutch Golden Age of the 17th and 18th centuries; "by common consent, Jan van Huysum has been held to be the best painter of flowers." Trained in decoration from a young age, he "gradually developed an execution of details of the utmost beauty and finish" creating "wonderful flower pieces whereon drops of water and crawling ants could be seen without a magnifying glass."

== Life and work ==
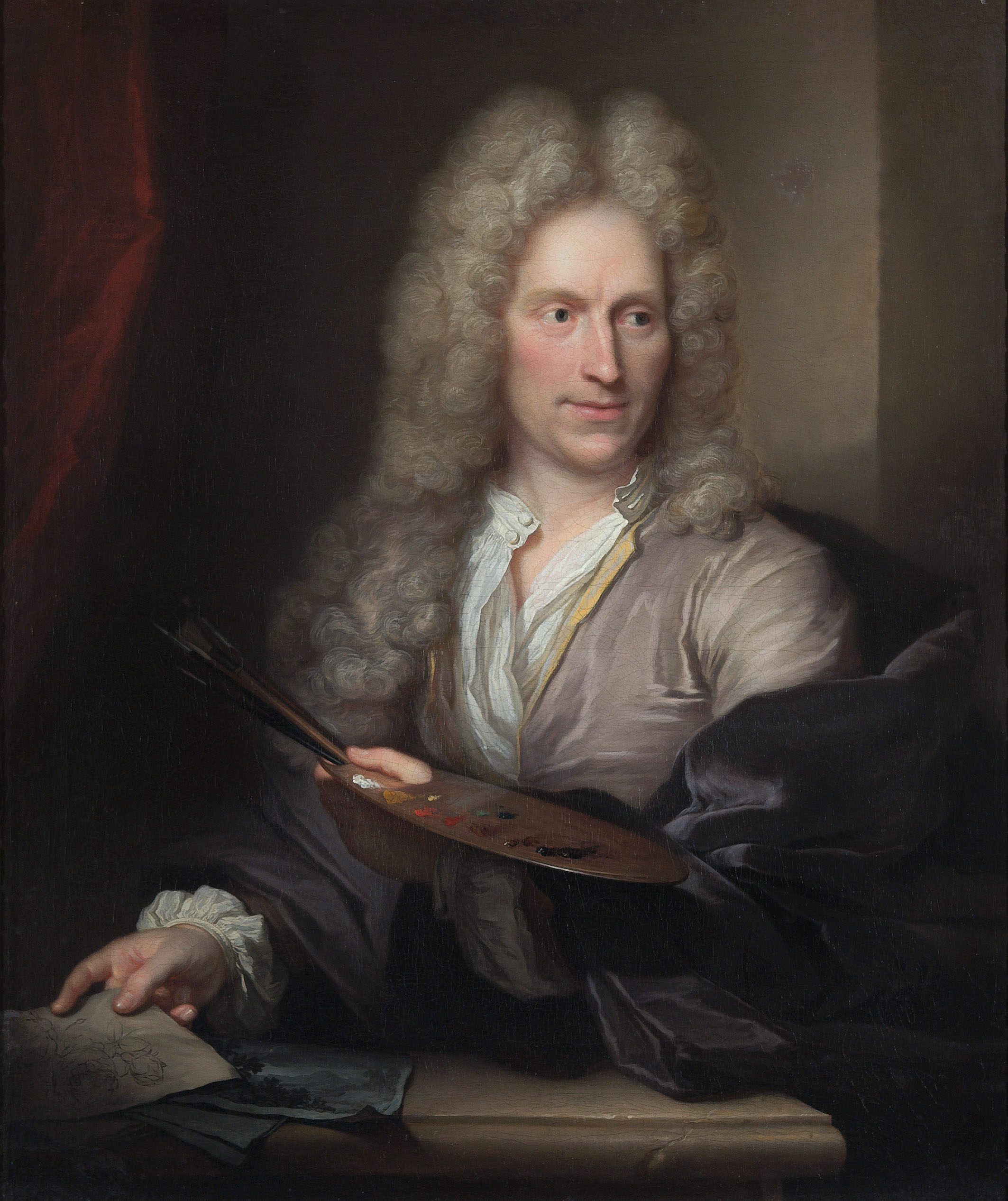
Portrait of Jan van Huysum by Arnold Boonen, ca.1720

Jan was the son of the painter Justus van Huysum and his first wife Margrietje Schouten and the older brother of Jacob van Huysum and Justus van Huysum the Younger. Jan’s much younger half-brother Michiel van Huysum was also a flower painter. His grandfather Jan van Huysum the Elder is said to have been "expeditious in decorating doorways, screens and vases."

Van Huysum primarily lived and worked in the city of Amsterdam. Jan van Huysum and his wife Elisabeth Takens (1680–1751) had 12 children together but only three outlived their parents. Jan van Huysum's daughter, Francina Margaretha van Huysum, was also a flower painter and may have assisted her father in his work. Margareta Haverman was his student until she moved to Paris.

Van Huysum was somewhat secretive about his process and worked separately from the rest of his family. One of the few sources of biography for Van Huysum is art dealer Christiaan Josi. Another is his contemporary Johan von Gool.

Jan Van Huysum "holds the highest place among painters of fruit and flowers." His flower-arrangement still lifes, in a style of the period collectively called vanitas and/or Pronkstilleven, are said to possess "an unerring elegance of composition, which enabled him to avoid the imbalance, the overcomposition, that others risked." His flower pictures produced after 1720 "on light or yellow grounds are superior to his earlier works, which are on dark ones." He often painted on oak and copper panels rather than canvas. Van Huysum would initially paint his leaves in blue and then apply a brown or green overwash; this technique was pioneered by Otto Marseus van Schrieck. He painted from "life," meaning fresh-cut flowers, assembling them over time into visual bouquets; sometimes this meant pieces took a year or more as he waited for certain blossoms to come back in season, such as a yellow rose he wanted for 1742 picture.

He was successful in his own time, with his pictures sought "by princes and crowned heads—his work sometimes sold for four to five times as much as work by Rembrandt van Rijn—and "time has increased, rather than diminished" the value of his paintings. Buyers of note during van Huysum's lifetime included Prince William of Hesse, and Sir Robert Walpole, a British Prime Minister.

His contemporary rival was Rachel Ruysch. The earlier Dutch artist Jan David de Heem anticipated van Huysum; "if de Heem, by the harmony of his warm golden color, be called the Titian of flowers and fruits, Jan van Huysum’s bright and sunny treatment entitles him to the name of the Corregio of the same branch of art".

== Influence ==
Van Huysum's work determined the "main trends in flower paintings for sixty to eighty years after his death."

Fruit and flower artists whose work is described as inspired by or analogous to that of Jan van Huysum: Jacob van Huysum (his brother), Justus van Huysum (his father), Pieter Faes, Wybrand Hendriks, Paul Theodore van Brussel, Jacobus Linthorst, Jan van Os, George Jacob Jan van Os (son of preceding), Gerard van Spaendonck, Cornelius van Spaendonck (brother of preceding), Coenraet Roepel, Johannes de Bosch, and John Flaxman.

== Work in other genres ==
One art historian called van Huysum’s landscapes (as opposed to his still lifes) "rather unfortunate."

Half of his pictures in public galleries are landscapes, views of imaginary lakes and harbours with impossible ruins and classic edifices, and woods of tall and motionless trees-the whole very glossy and smooth, and entirely lifeless. The earliest dated work of this kind is that of 1717, in the Louvre, a grove with maidens culling flowers near a tomb, ruins of a portico, and a distant palace on the shores of a lake bounded by mountains. According to one 19th century art historian, "His small [landscapes] are tenderly touched, and are sufficiently pleasing with their minuteness of detail, but those of a larger size are weak and ineffective."

=== Access and collections ===
Van Huysum’s paintings are in the collections of the Louvre in Paris, the Rijksmuseum in Amsterdam, the Mauritshuis of The Hague, the National Gallery of London, The Hermitage in St. Petersburg, as well as in Berlin, Munich, Hanover, Dresden, Brunschwige, Vienna, Carlsruhe, Boston, Copenhagen, the Dulwich Picture Gallery, and the Getty in the United States.

Circa 1911: Some of the finest of van Huysum's fruit and flower pieces were in English private collections: those of 1723 in the Francis Egerton, 1st Earl of Ellesmere's gallery; others of 1730–1732 in the collections of Henry Hope of Cavendish Square (Hope & Co. banking money), and Francis Baring, 5th Baron Ashburton and/or Thomas Baring, 1st Earl of Northbrook (both Barings Bank money).

== Gallery ==
Selected works

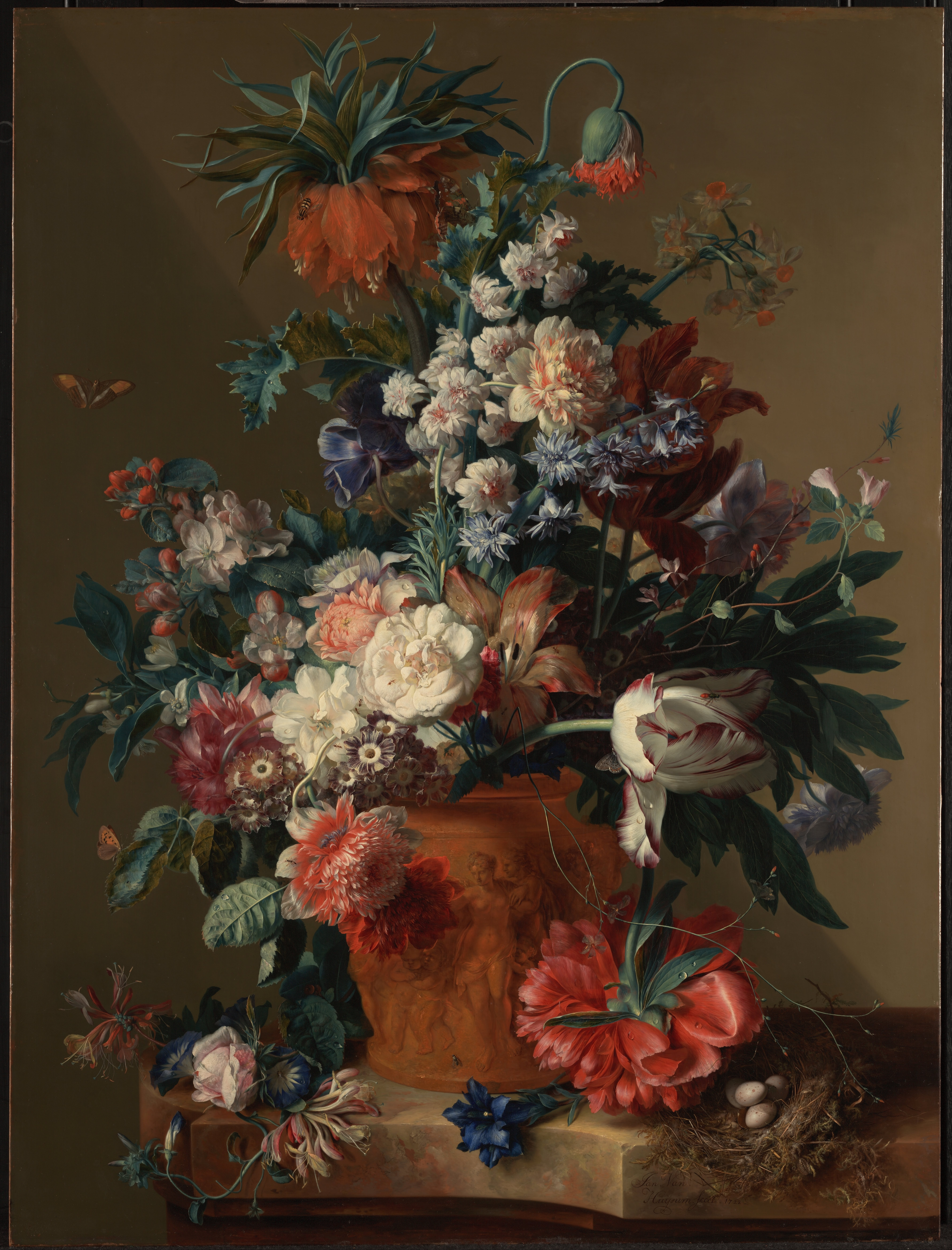
Vase of Flowers, 1722

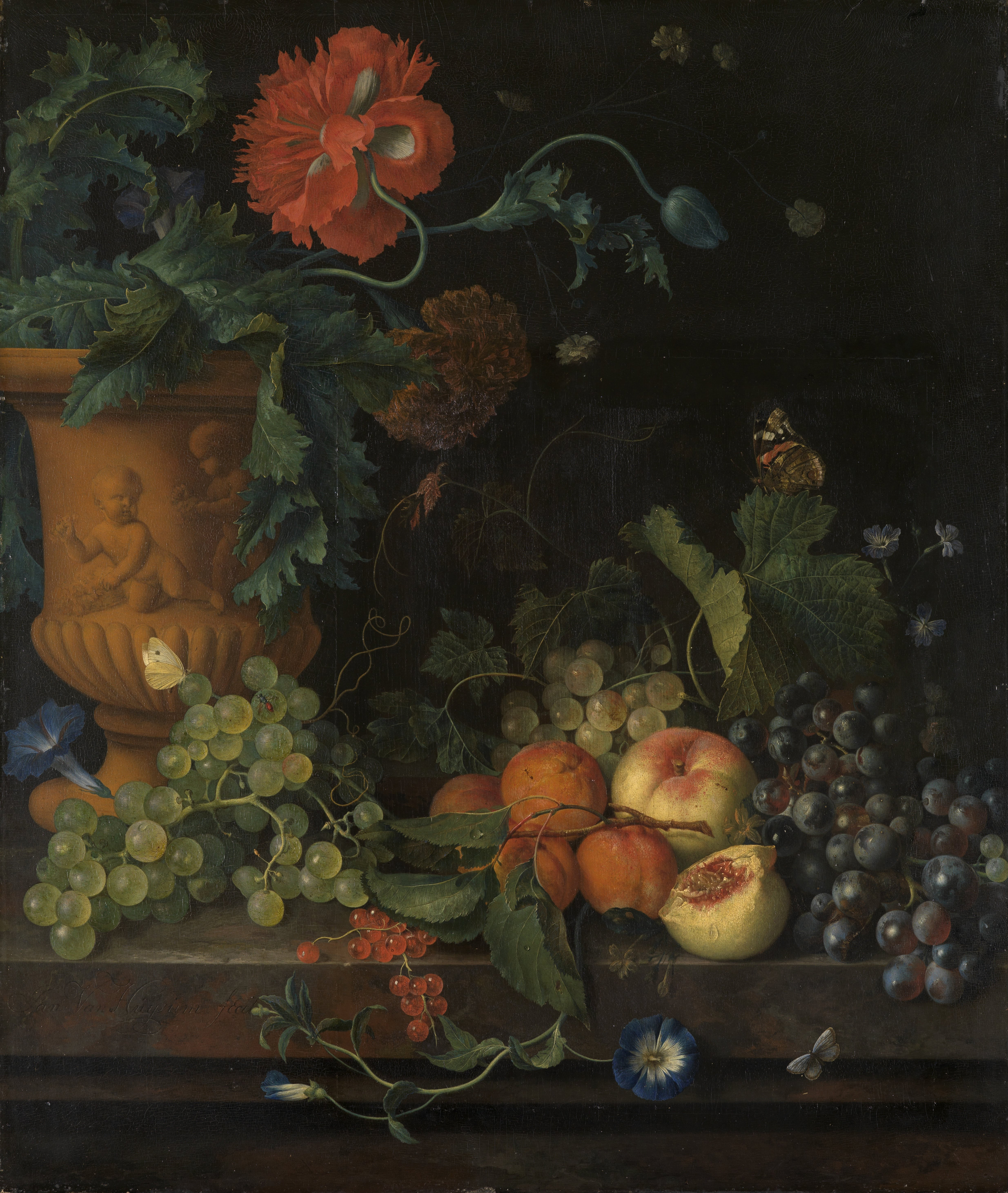
Terracotta Vase with Flowers and Fruits

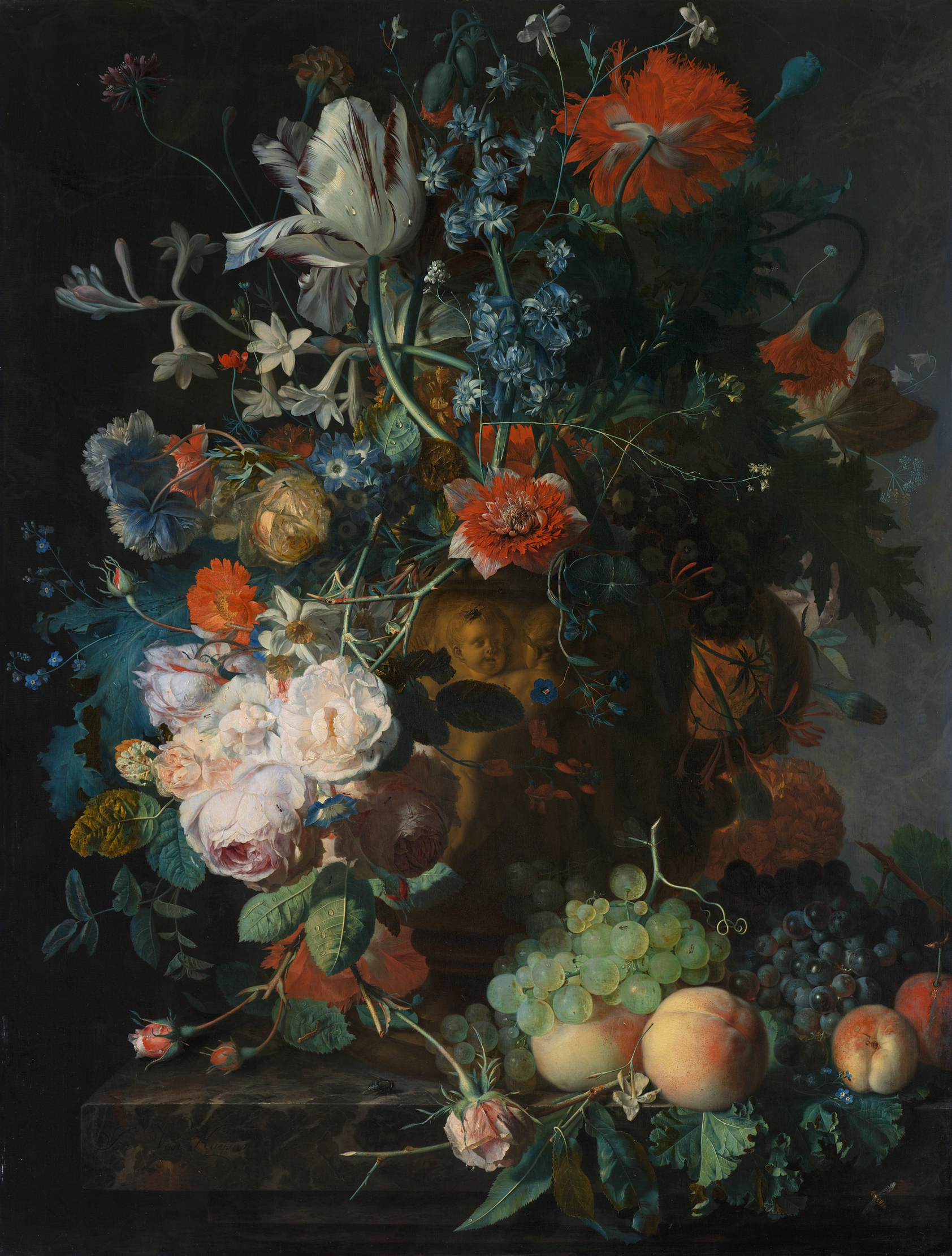
Flowers and Fruits

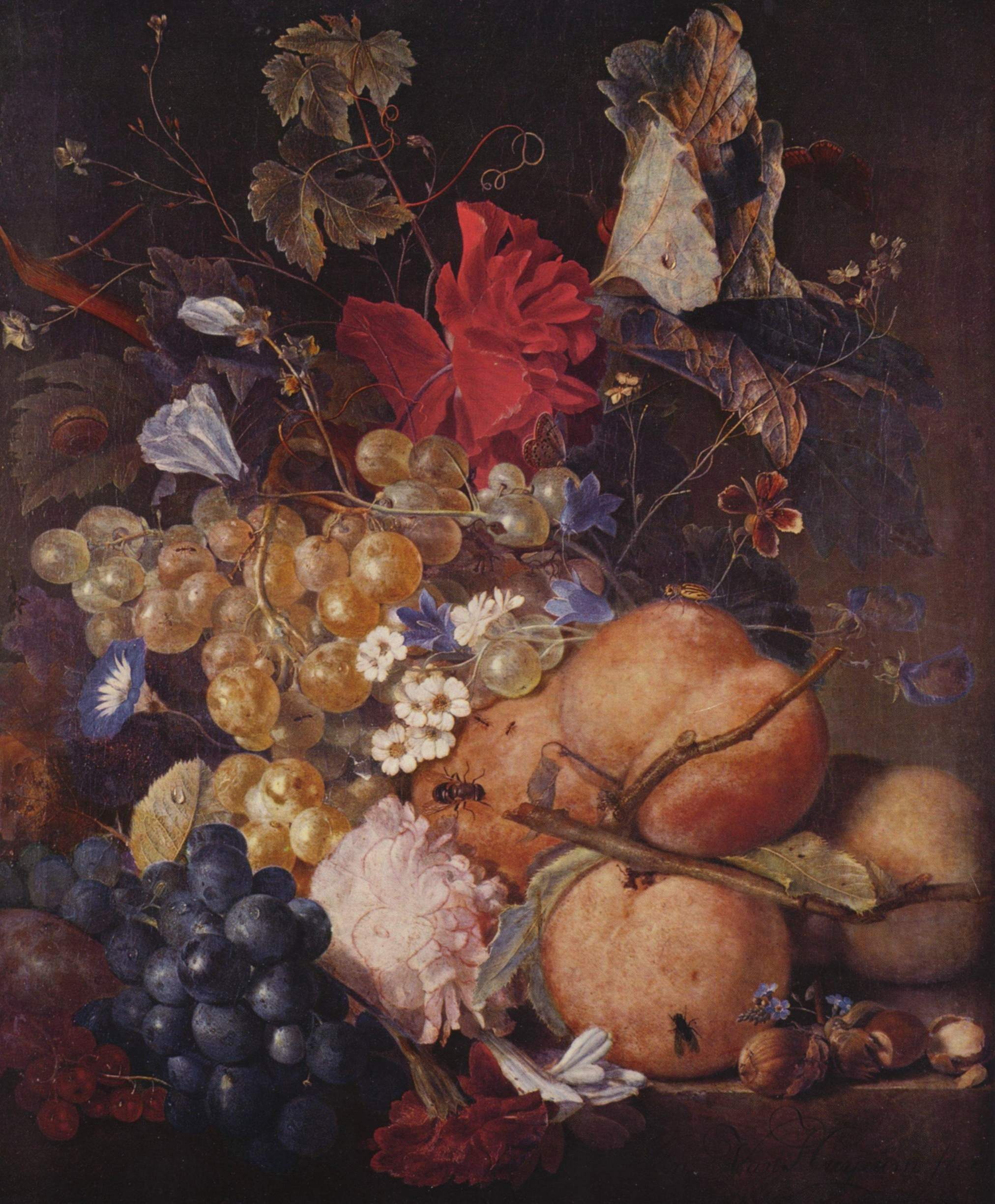
Flowers, Fruits and Insects

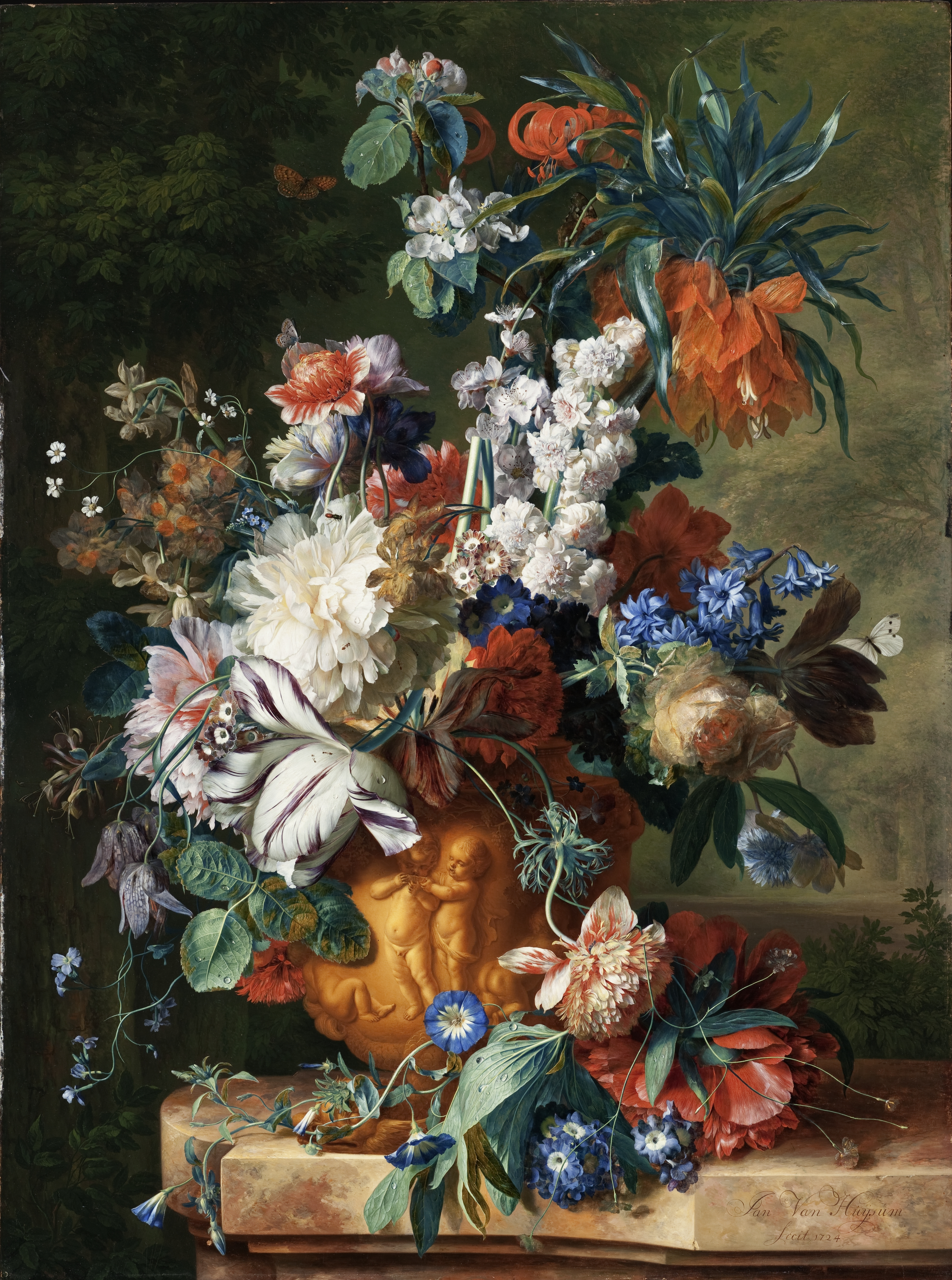
"Bouquet of Flowers in an Urn", 1724

The refinement of [Jan van Huysum]’s palette excels in its sophistication…Details, texture, defy description. Only an examination of the originals will suffice, as no process of reproduction can convey the subtleties of observation.

— Peter Mitchell, European Flower Painters (1981)

=== The stolen Vase of Flowers ===
The Vase of Flowers is a painting by van Huysum that was stolen from Italy by the retreating Wehrmacht in 1943. On 19 July 2019 German minister of foreign affairs Heiko Maas personally handed the picture to his Italian counterpart Enzo Moavero Milanesi in Florence and it was restored to the collection of the Uffizi.
