= Johannes de Bosch =

Dutch painter, engraver and draughtsman

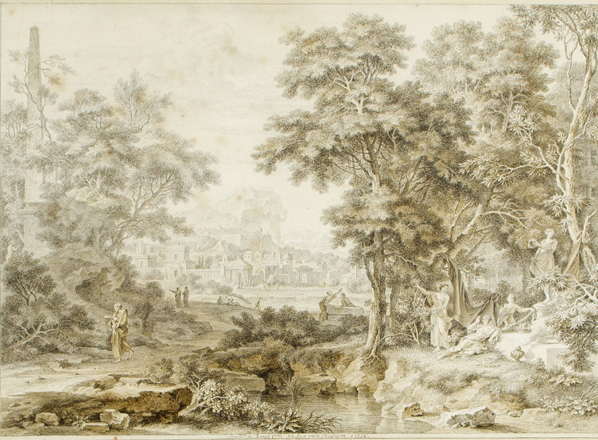
Johannes de Bosch, "Arcadian landscape", Private collection.

Johannes de Bosch (1713–1785) was a Dutch painter, engraver and draughtsman. He was born in Amsterdam, the son of the apothecary Jeroen de Bosch who owned a significant collection of paintings and drawings, so he was surrounded and influenced by fine art from an early age.

He specialized in painting and drawing arcadian landscapes, inspired by the work of other artists such as the Dutch painter Jan van Huysum (Amsterdam 1682 - 1749). De Bosch also designed various vignettes for different publications, which were in turn engraved by several other artists.

He is known also for his topographical drawings of several Dutch cities, such as Amsterdam and Zeist. His work is present in several national and international museums, such as the Teylers Museum (Haarlem), the Rijksmuseum (Amsterdam), the Hamburger Kunsthalle (Hamburg) and the Städel Museum (Frankfurt).
