= Ted Meines =

Lieutenant general Ted Meines
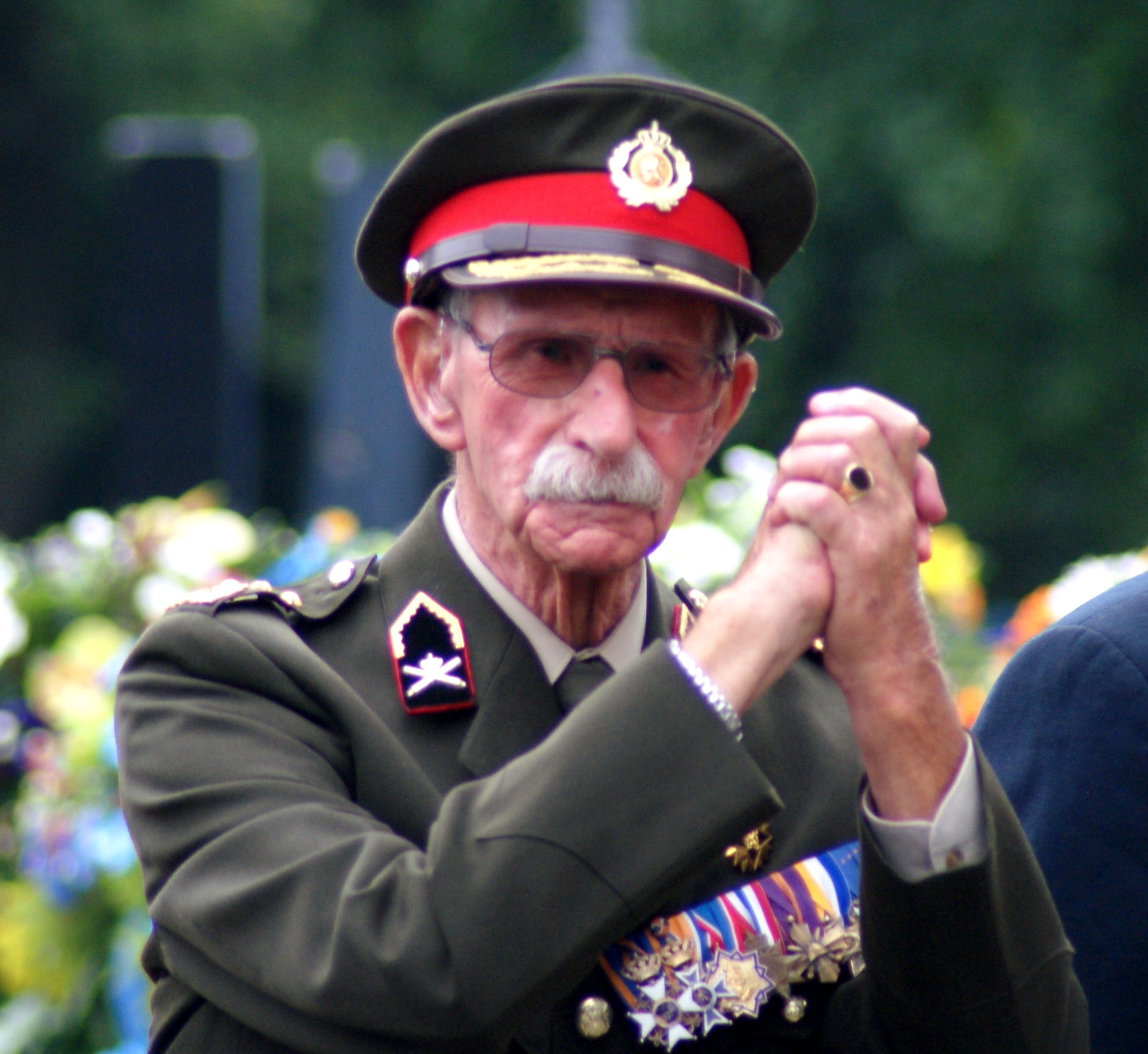
- Ted Meines in 2013
- Born: Tette Meines; 25 September 1921; Huizum, Netherlands
- Died: 24 December 2016 (aged 95) Leidschendam, Netherlands
- Allegiance: Netherlands
- Branch: Dutch resistance Royal Netherlands Army
- Service years: 1942–1976
- Rank: Lieutenant general
- Conflicts: World War II; Dutch resistance; Indonesian National Revolution
- Awards: Knight of the Order of the Netherlands Lion; Officer of the Order of Orange-Nassau with Swords; Decoration of Merit; Medal for Order and Peace; Mobilisation War Cross; Righteous Among the Nations; Honorary citizen of Israel

Tette "Ted" Meines (25 September 1921 – 24 December 2016) was a lieutenant general in the Royal Netherlands Army and an activist for veterans' rights. During World War II, he was a member of the Dutch resistance and helped Jewish families, for which he was awarded the title Righteous Among the Nations by Israel. After the war had ended, Meines saw active service in the Politionele acties. During and after his military career, he became involved in veteran affairs and was instrumental in the setting up of several veterans organizations. He is considered the founder of the Dutch veteran affairs policy.

== Early life and World War II ==
Meines was born on 25 September 1921 in Huizum. He grew up in a Reformed Christian family in Friesland and had four sisters. His father worked for the railways and was a local and provincial politician for the Anti-Revolutionary Party. He wished that his son would obtain a political position and thus helped him get a job at the municipality. He belonged to the class that would be called up for military service in June 1940. During the German raid the month before, he tried to enlist early or leave the country.

During World War II, at age 22, Meines joined the Dutch resistance. He arranged for ration cards, sought safe hiding places for children and moved them there. Amongst other places he worked in Limburg and Twente. Meines was a member of the NV-resistancegroup. In 1942 Meines was arrested, but was rescued by resistance members before he could be deported to a concentration camp. Afterwards Meines had to take another alias, and took that of deceased minister Sjoeke Nutma. Due to Meines still being wanted he was forced to also act like a minister. In this role Meines delivered sermons to full congregations. During the war Meines joined the Binnenlandse Strijdkrachten. Of his original group of twenty resistance members only four survived until the liberation of the Netherlands on 5 May 1945.

== Later career ==
Although exempt from military service, Meines enrolled as a war volunteer in August 1945. He was trained as an officer in England between 1945 and 1947, finishing his training as a second lieutenant. Meines met Prince Bernhard of Lippe-Biesterfeld during his time abroad. Inspired by The Royal British Legion the two decided to set up an association for veterans.

In 1948 Meines became a professional soldier. In April 1949 Meines was promoted to first lieutenant. With the Politionele acties happening in the Dutch East Indies Meines wished to serve there. However, his request was denied as he was deemed too valuable for the renewal of the Dutch armed forces. In September 1949 Meines saw his earlier request fulfilled and he was sent to the Western Java, Dutch East Indies. He returned to the Netherlands in October 1950. He subsequently served at the artillery school. From January to July 1952 he received training at Fort Sill, Oklahoma, United States. He was promoted to captain in 1954.

In 1957 Meines started serving with the 43rd and later 12th Artillery Division. From 1959 to 1965 he held several military staff positions, and he was promoted to major in 1961. In 1965 he became part of the 41st Artillery Division. And two years later was promoted to lieutenant-colonel. In 1969 Meines became head of the restructuring section. In 1971 he was promoted to colonel and became deputy commander of the 42e Pantserinfanteriebrigade. In May 1973 Meines was named to temporary deputy head of logistics. Ten months later he was promoted to brigade general and a subsequent two months later to major-general when he was assigned as deputy quartermaster-general. Meines retired in November 1976 as major general, aged 55.

After his military career ended Meines became director of the Nederlandse Hartstichting, where he worked until 1986. At the Hartstichting he restructured the organization and made a money collection plan.

== Work for veterans ==
Meines was active in veteran affairs since 1950. He was the founder of Het Veteranen Legioen Nederland. In 1988 he became the first chairperson of the newly founded Veteranenstichting. Meines was instrumental in the creation of the Veteranenplatform. The platform united dozens of veteran affairs organizations. Meines led the platform until 1998. During this time he managed to persuade Defence Minister Relus ter Beek to form a more active veterans policy. Which culminated in an annual veterans day since 1995 and a Veterans law in 2012. The Veterans Platforms instituted a Ted Meines Prize when Meines left the organization. In 1994 Meines was promoted to titular lieutenant-general. Meines has stated that Prince Bernhard of Lippe-Biesterfeld told him shortly before his death in 2004 to take care of the veterans of the Netherlands.

In 2010 Meines was the parade commander at the yearly parade of veterans in Wageningen. In December 2013 a bust of him was revealed at a military base in Doorn. On his 93rd birthday, in 2014, he was effectively promoted to lieutenant-general. He was given the promotion for his services to the Armed forces of the Netherlands and especially his work for veterans. In 2016 Meines spoke before the House of Representatives, where he argued for Soestdijk Palace to be converted in a center for veterans. Later that year Meines had to cancel his appearance at several meetings for health reasons.

On his death Defence Minister Jeanine Hennis-Plasschaert called Meines "the founder of the current veterans policy".

== Awards and decorations ==
On 6 July 1992 Meines was recognized as a Righteous Among the Nations by Israel for his work in saving Jewish people in World War II. In 2015 he was awarded honorary citizenship of Israel.

Meines was a Knight in the Order of the Netherlands Lion and an Officer in the Order of Orange-Nassau with swords. He was also awarded the Ereteken voor Orde en Vrede, Mobilisatie-Oorlogskruis and Decoration of Merit in gold.

== Personal life ==
Meines met his wife, Doreen de Veer, in the Dutch East Indies. The couple returned to the Netherlands in 1950 and later had a son and daughter. Apart from his friendship and confidency with Prince Bernhard of Lippe-Biesterfeld, Meines also had a friendship with Bernhards grandson, Willem-Alexander of the Netherlands.

Meines cited a meeting with Martin Luther King Jr. in 1952 as important in his life, with King Jr. telling him: "Be yourself, be good and tell it".

Meines died in his home town of Leidschendam on 24 December 2016, aged 95.`

== Gallery ==
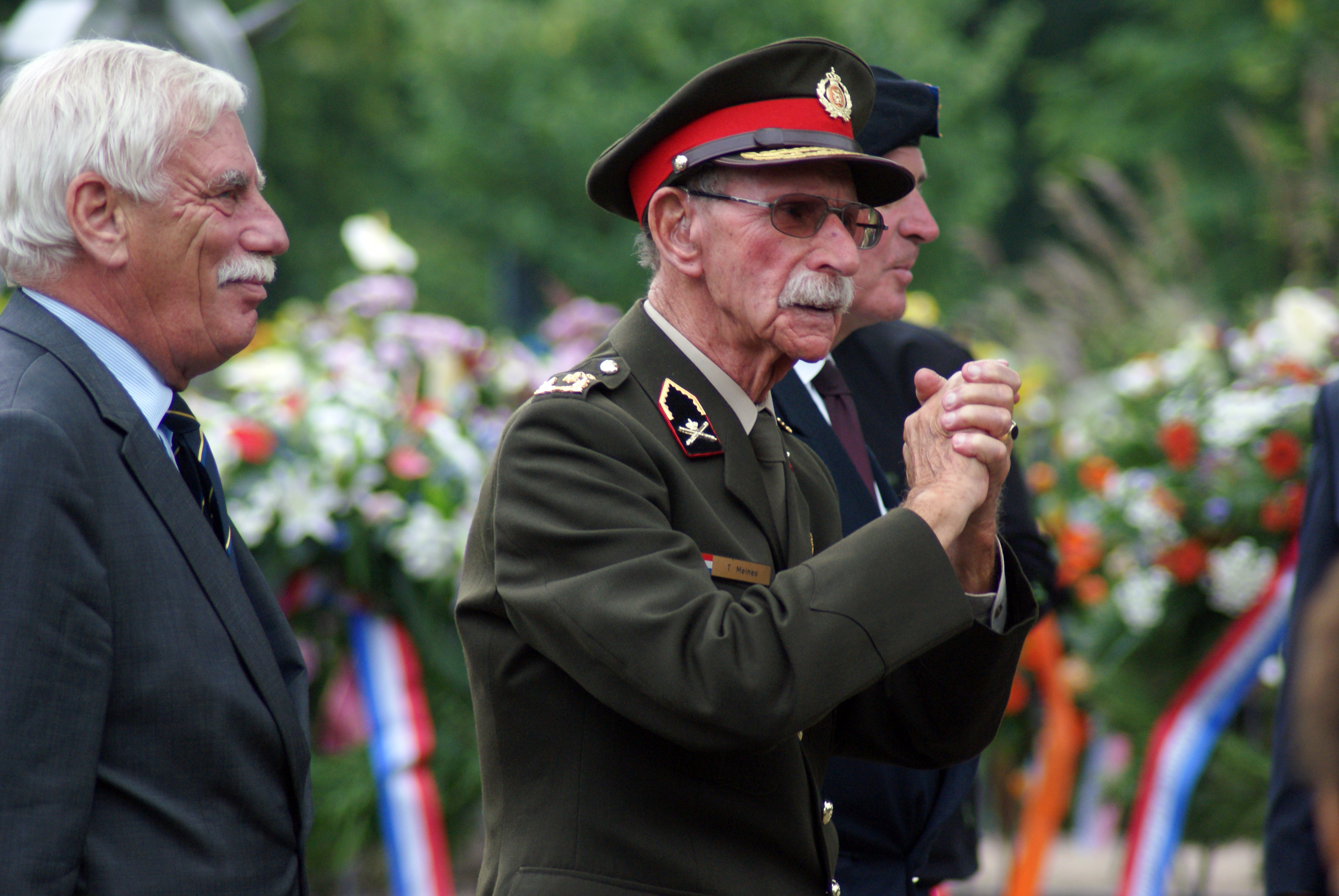
Lieutenant General Ted Meines Indies commemoration Roermond 2013

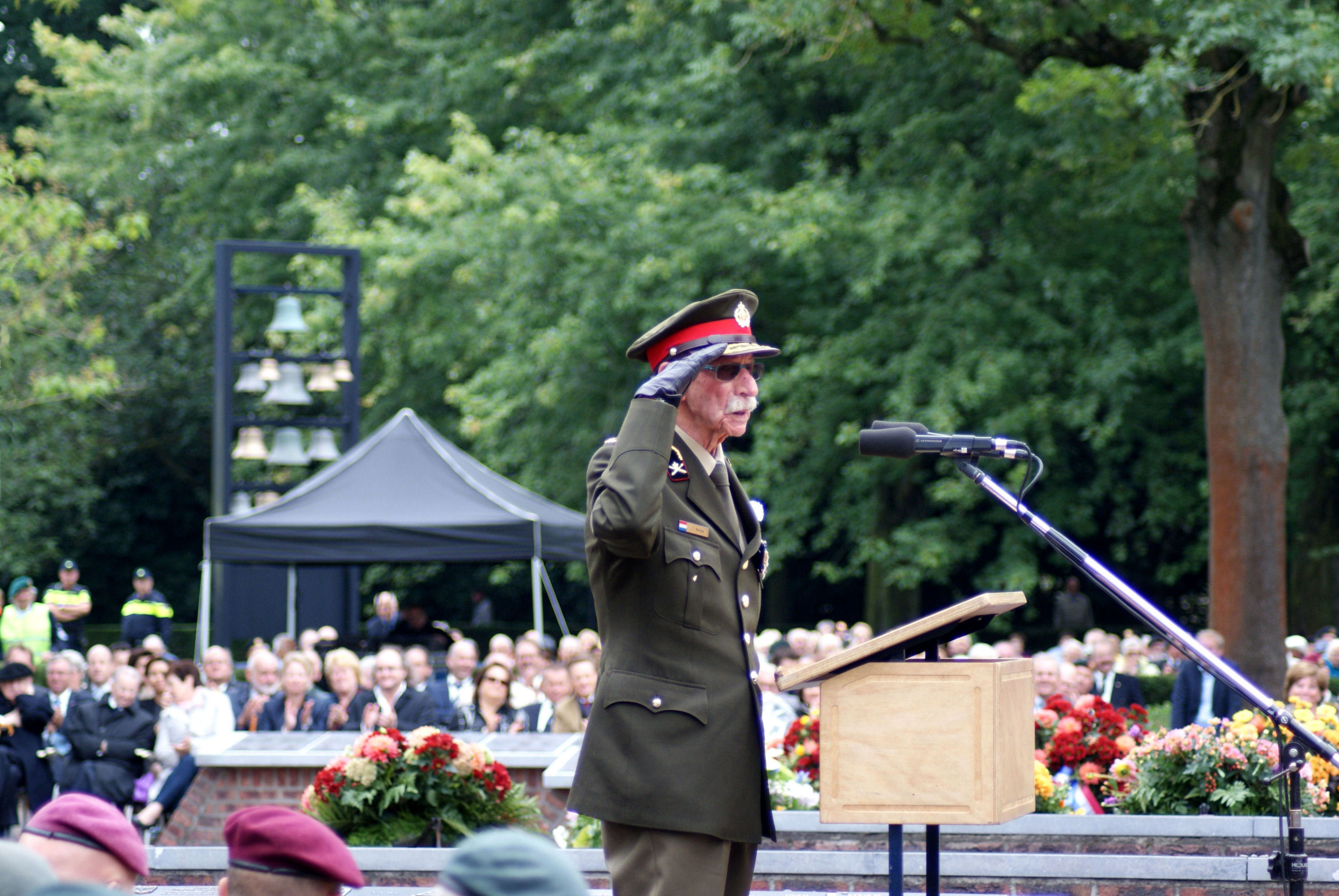
Lieutenant General Ted Meines Indies commemoration Roermond 2015

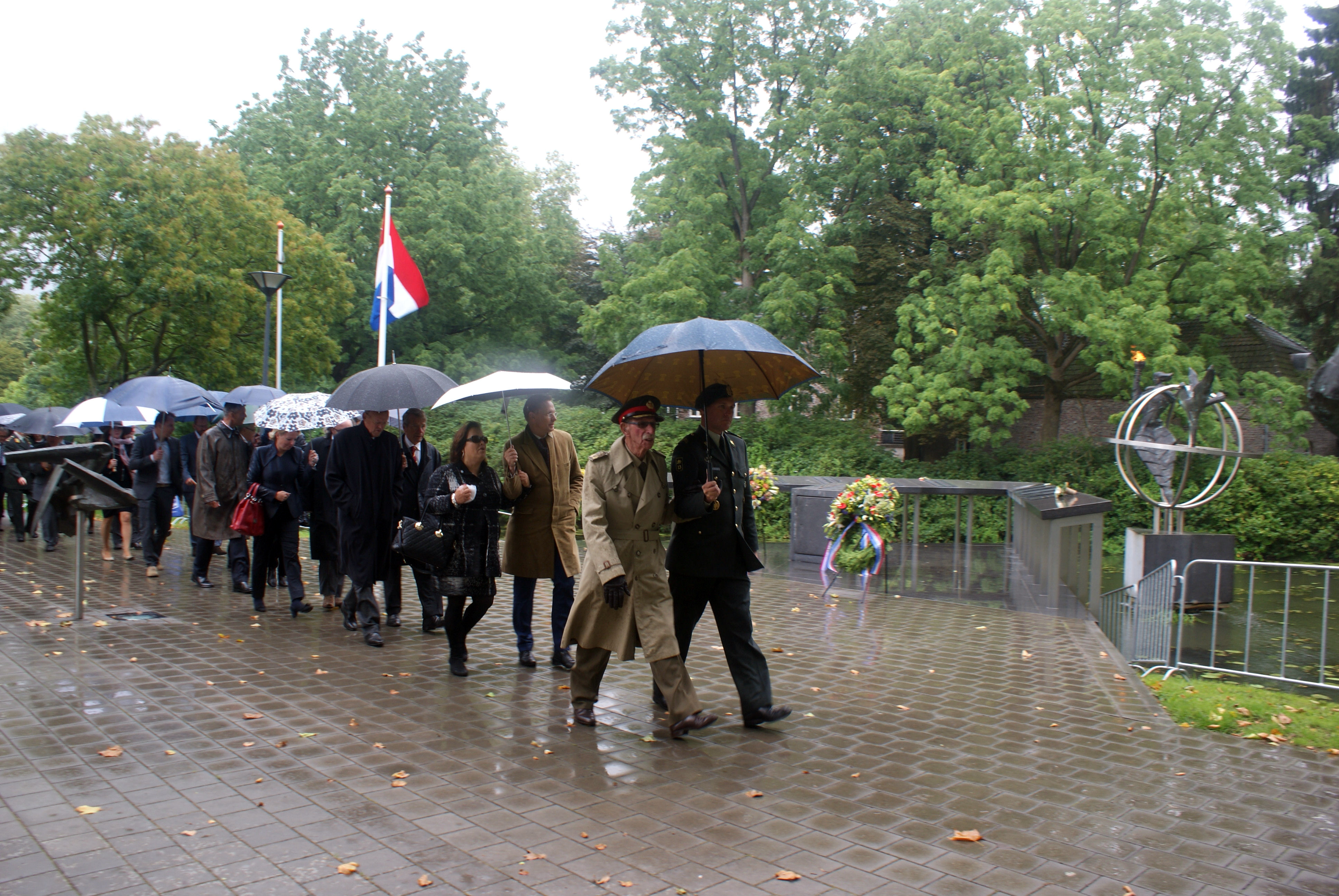
Lieutenant General Ted Meines Indies commemoration Roermond 2015

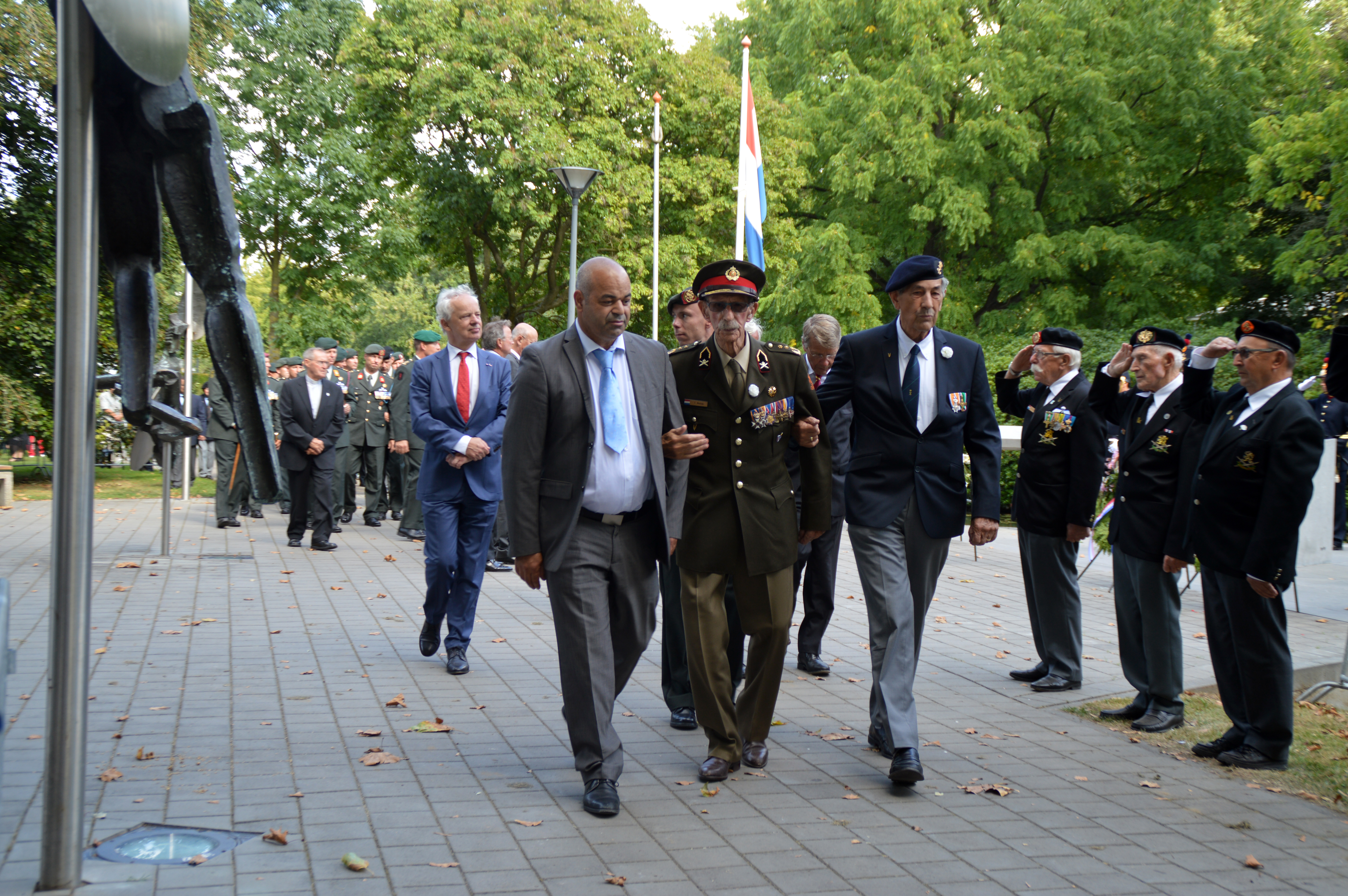
Lieutenant General Ted Meines Indies commemoration Roermond 2016
