= Lytse Geast =

Lytse Geast Kleinegeest
- Hamlet
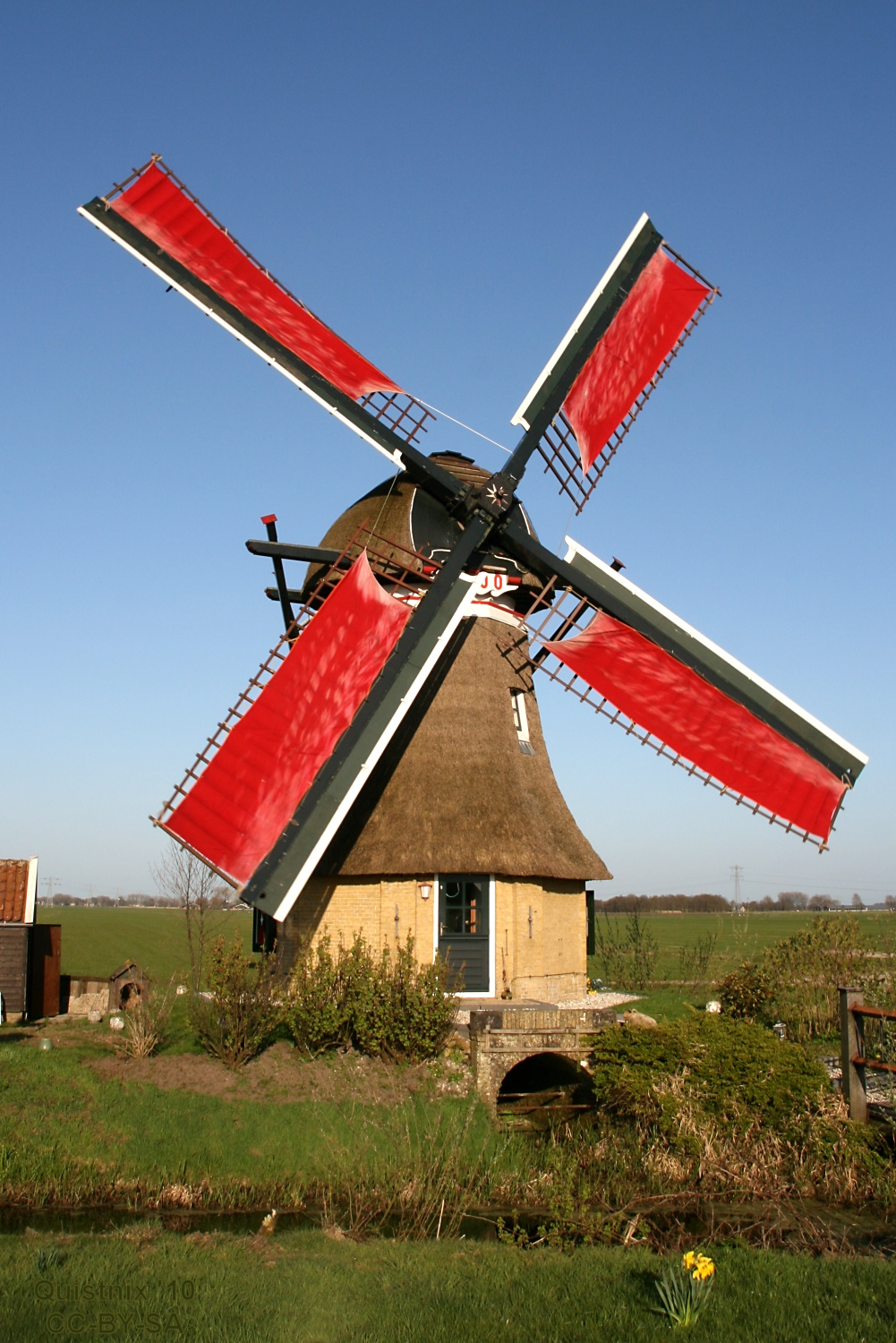
- Wind mill De Swarte Prinsch

- Location in the Netherlands Lytse Geast (Netherlands)
- Coordinates: 53°11′48″N 5°53′47″E
- Country: Netherlands
- Province: Friesland
- Municipality: Tytsjerksteradiel
- Time zone: UTC+1 (CET)
  - Summer (DST): UTC+2 (CEST)
- Postal code: 9255
- Dialing code: 0511

Lytse Geast (Dutch: Kleinegeest) is a hamlet in Tytsjerksteradiel in the province of Friesland, the Netherlands.

Lytse Geast is not a statistical entity, and the postal authorities have placed it under Tytsjerk.

The hamlet was first mentioned in 1543 as Lutke Geest, and means "little higher elevated sand ground", and was a little island in a bog. Lytse Geast was home to 75 people in 1840. It used to have a bakery and a grocery store, however the supermarkets caused the demise of the retail. Nowadays, it consists of about 60 houses inhabited by commuters.

The polder mill Swarte Prinsch was built in Lytse Geast in 1900 and was in commission until 1959. In 1967, it became a recreational home.
