= Tytsjerk =

Tytsjerk Tietjerk
- Village
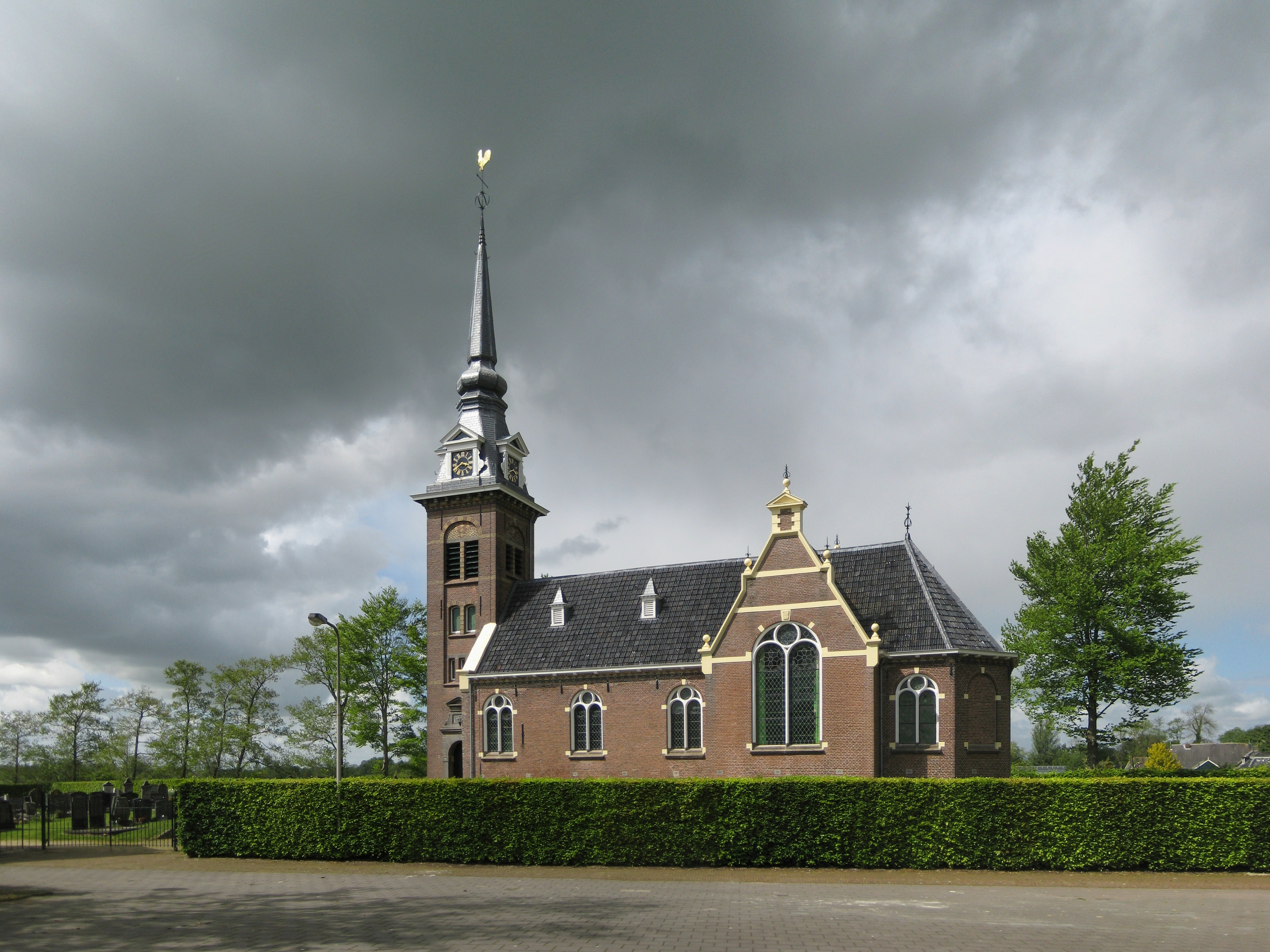
- Tytsjerk, Church (2014)

- Flag Coat of arms

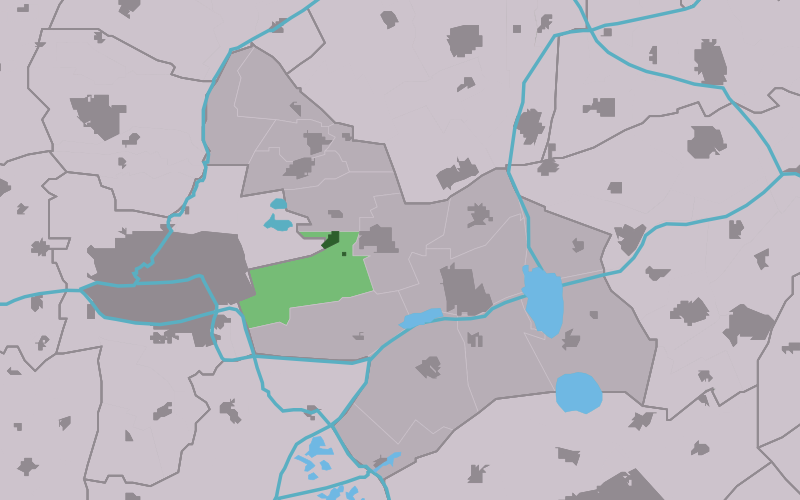
- Location of the village in Tytsjerksteradiel

- Location in the Netherlands Tytsjerk (Netherlands)
- Country: Netherlands
- Province: Friesland
- Municipality: Tytsjerksteradiel

Area
  - Total: 12.58 km^{2} (4.86 sq mi)
- Elevation: 0.6 m (2.0 ft)

Population (2021)
  - Total: 1,610
  - Density: 128/km^{2} (331/sq mi)
- Time zone: UTC+1 (CET)
  - Summer (DST): UTC+2 (CEST)
- Postal code: 9255
- Dialing code: 0511
- Website: Official

Tytsjerk (Dutch: Tietjerk) is a village in Tytsjerksteradiel in the province of Friesland in the Netherlands. It had a population of 1,614 in January 2017.

== History ==
The village was first mentioned in 1392 as Thiatzerckera, and means "the church of Tije (person)". Tytsjerk developed in the late middle ages. It had a road connection to Leeuwarden which resulted the construction of several estates.

The foundations of the church indicate that it already must have existed in the 13th century. The village itself is first mentioned in an ecclesiastical document from the year 1328. In 1720 the foundations of the contemporary church were laid. The bronze church bell, which dates from 1608, was taken to Germany during World War II to be melted for the production of bullets and bombs, but was returned. This bell once hung in a separate belfry but found its place in the tower of the church itself already two centuries ago.

Tytsjerk was home to 344 people in 1840.

=== Bosk fan Ypey ===
Near the village park Vijversburg can be found, also known as the 'Bosk fan Ypey' or 'Bos van Ypey' (Forest of Ypey). This domain was earlier held by the rich families Looxma and Ypey. Later it became the property of the 'Op Toutenburg' Foundation. The park is laid out by the landscape architect Lucas Roodbaard.

=== Windmills ===
There are two windmills in the village, the Himriksmole and Lytse Geast.

== Community ==
=== Population ===
- 1900 - 761
- 1910 - 828
- 1940 - 902
- 1954 - 829
- 1959 - 786
- 1964 - 954
- 1969 - 1255
- 1974 - 1435
- 2004 - 1400
- 2008 - 1539

== Gallery ==
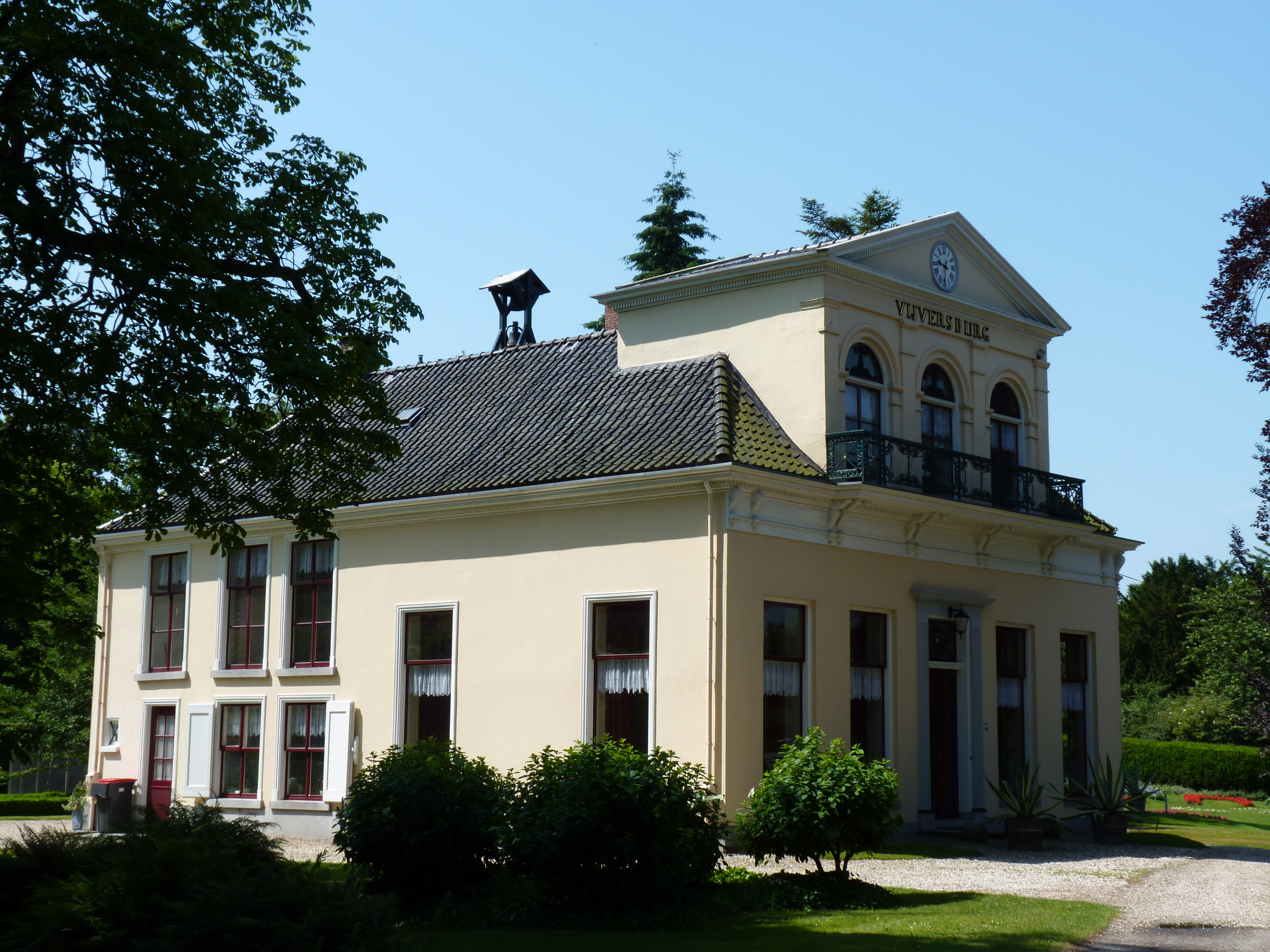
Villa Vijverburg

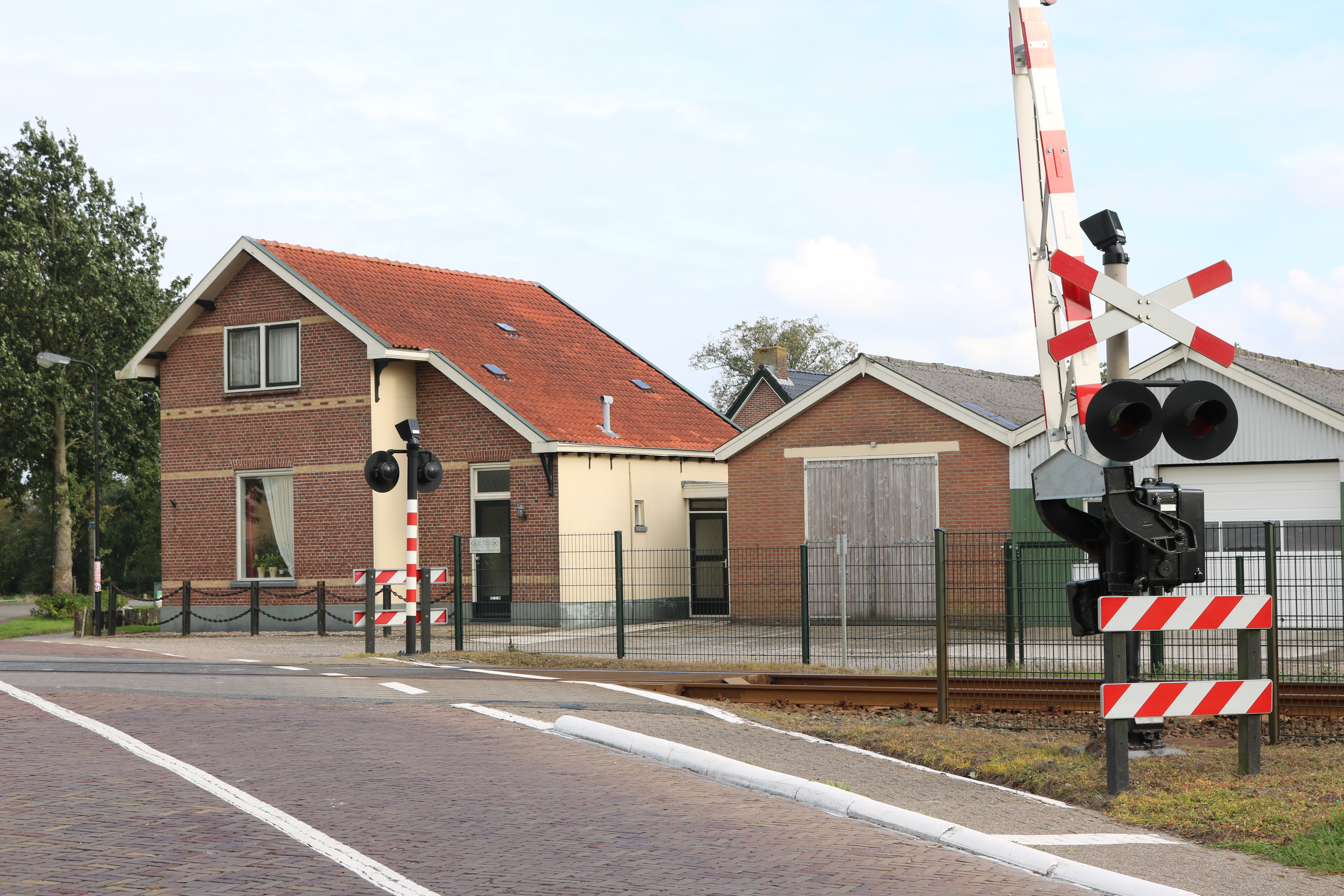
Former guard house near the railroad crossing

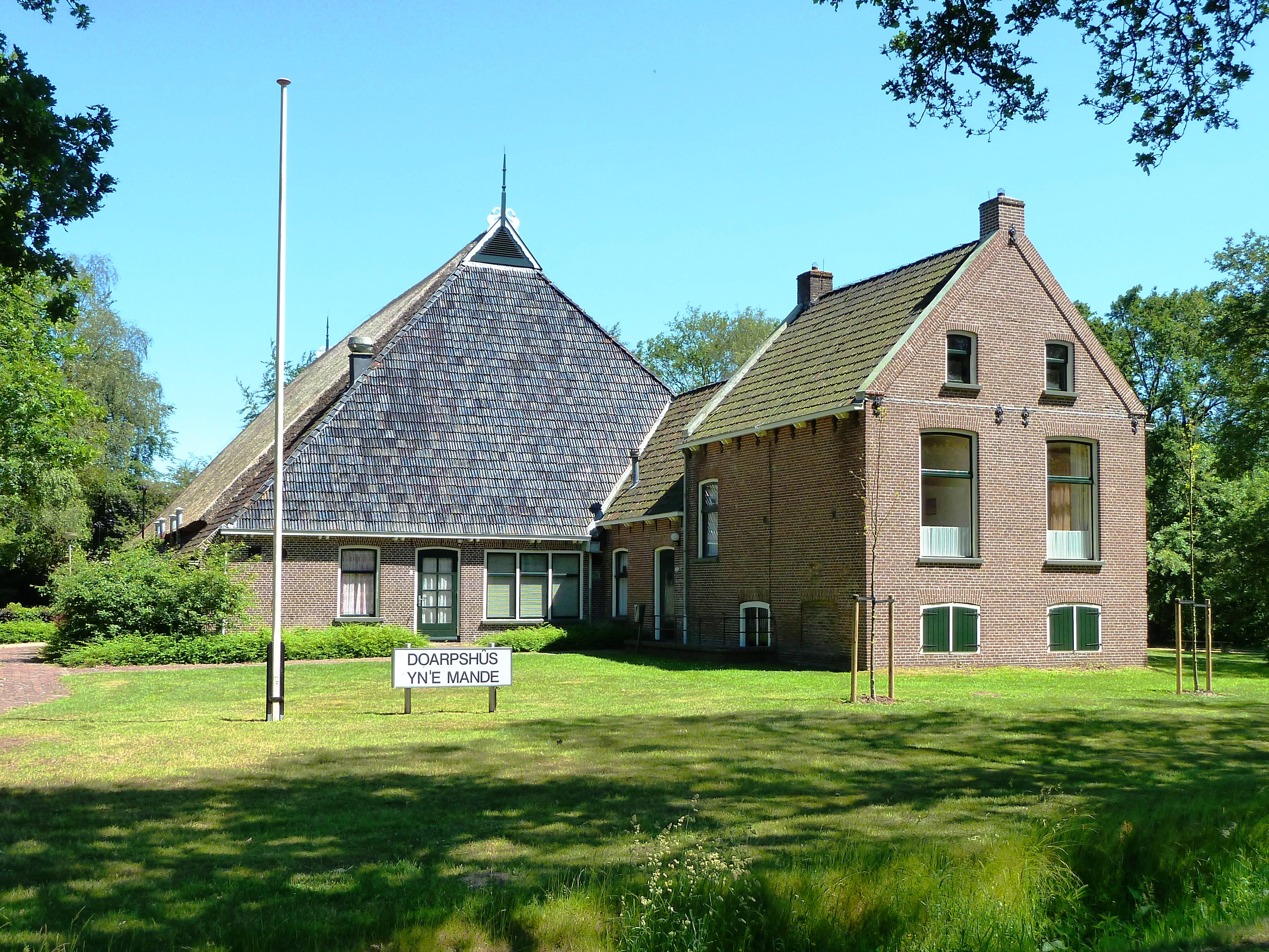
Farm used a village house

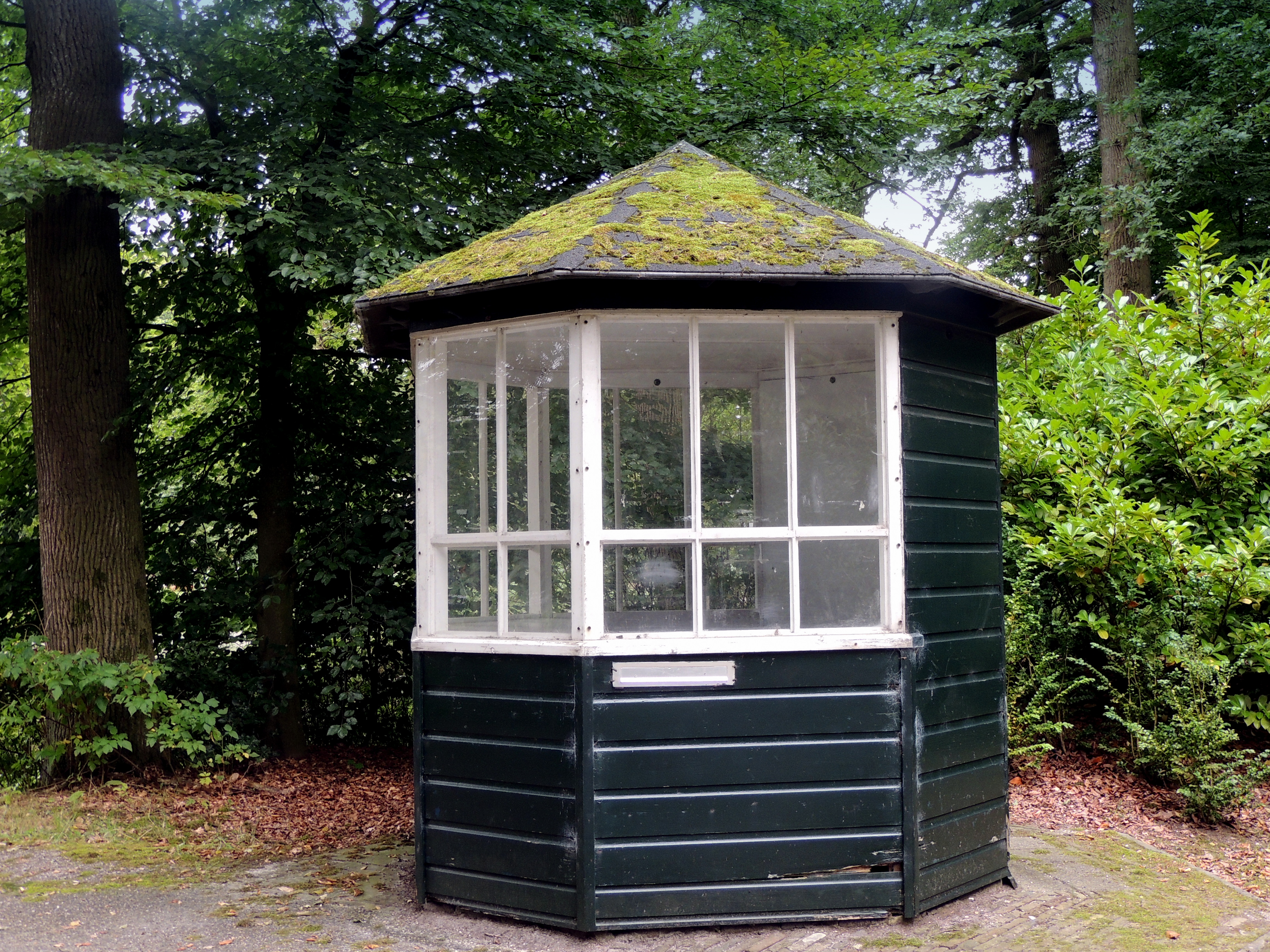
Garden cupola
