= Jacobus Linthorst =

Dutch painter

- Born: 1745; Amsterdam
- Died: 7 August 1815 (aged 69–70); Amsterdam

Jacobus Linthorst (c. 1745 – 7 August 1815) was a painter from the Dutch Republic.

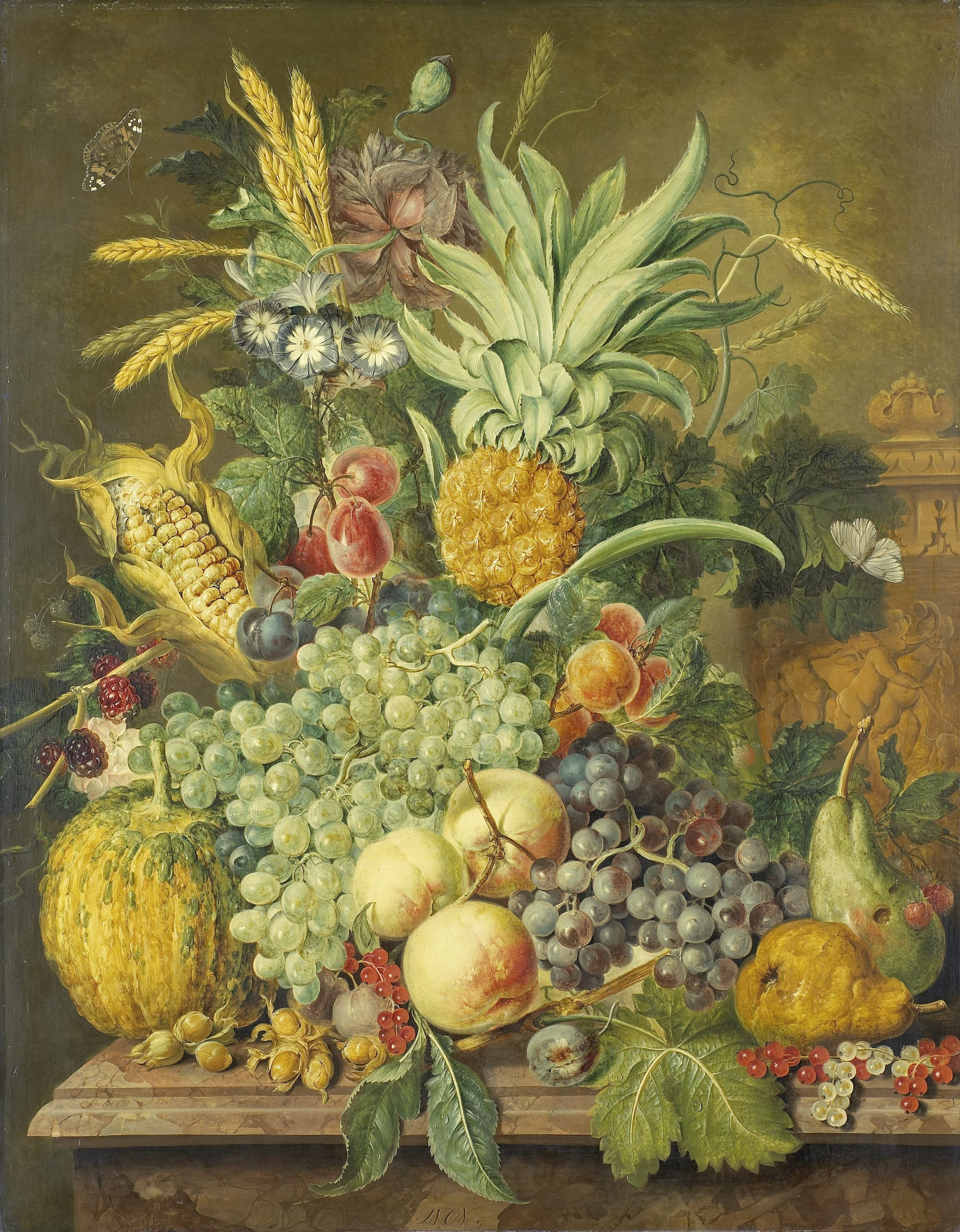
Still life with fruit, 1808

Linthorst was born in Amsterdam where he is known for fruit and flower arrangements as interior decorations as well as paintings. He was a follower of Rachel Ruysch and Jan van Huysum. He became a member of the Amsterdam guild of St. Luke on 6 June 1789. Linthorst died in Amsterdam.
