= Francina Margaretha van Huysum =

Dutch artist (1707–1789)

- Born: 1707; Amsterdam, Netherlands
- Died: 1789 (aged 81–82); Amsterdam, Netherlands
- Known for: Painting

Francina Margaretha van Huysum (1707–1789) was an 18th-century flower painter from the Dutch Republic.

== Biography ==
She was born in Amsterdam as the daughter of Jan van Huysum and probably assisted him with his work. In the 20 page biography of her father written by Jan van Gool, the only woman mentioned is Margaretha Haverman who Van Gool claimed had been allowed to become his only pupil "under false pretenses". This phrase was meant to indicate that Van Huysum was willing to let female relatives of family and friends assist him (presumably because they could not sign their own names) but avoided the help of male pupils for fear of revealing his technique and creating competition. It is unclear therefore whether he allowed his daughter or his sister Maria to assist him.

According to the RKD Francina's works have been formerly attributed to her father Jan and later to her uncle Michiel and were only in 2006 re-attributed to her by Sam Segal. The works definitely attributed to her are a pair of pendant paintings dated 1729 and now in the collection of the Fitzwilliam Museum. A copy of these pendant paintings with hopelessly overpainted signatures, are now considered autograph and are in the Dulwich Picture Gallery. It is this undated pair of period copies which were documented by John Smith in 1835 as by Jan van Huysum and whose attribution was repeated in 1928 by Cornelis Hofstede de Groot.

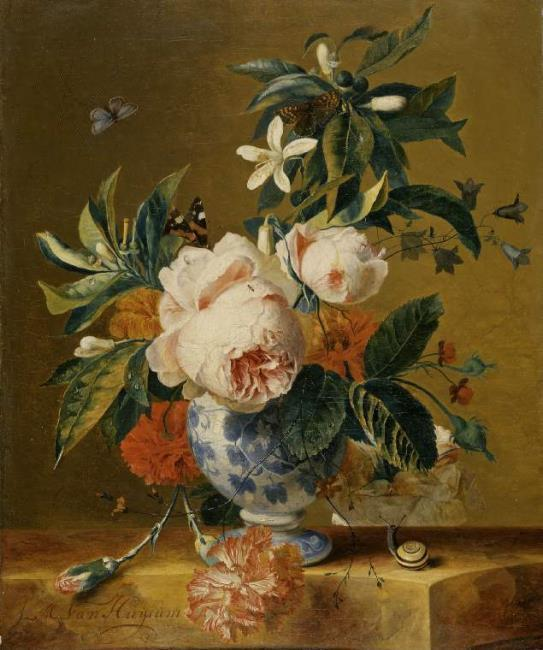
Flowers, Fitzwilliam Museum

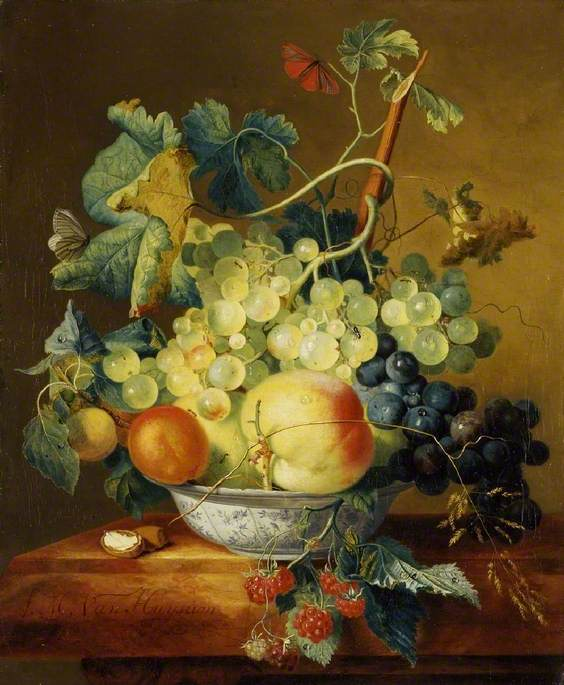
Fruit, Fitzwilliam Museum

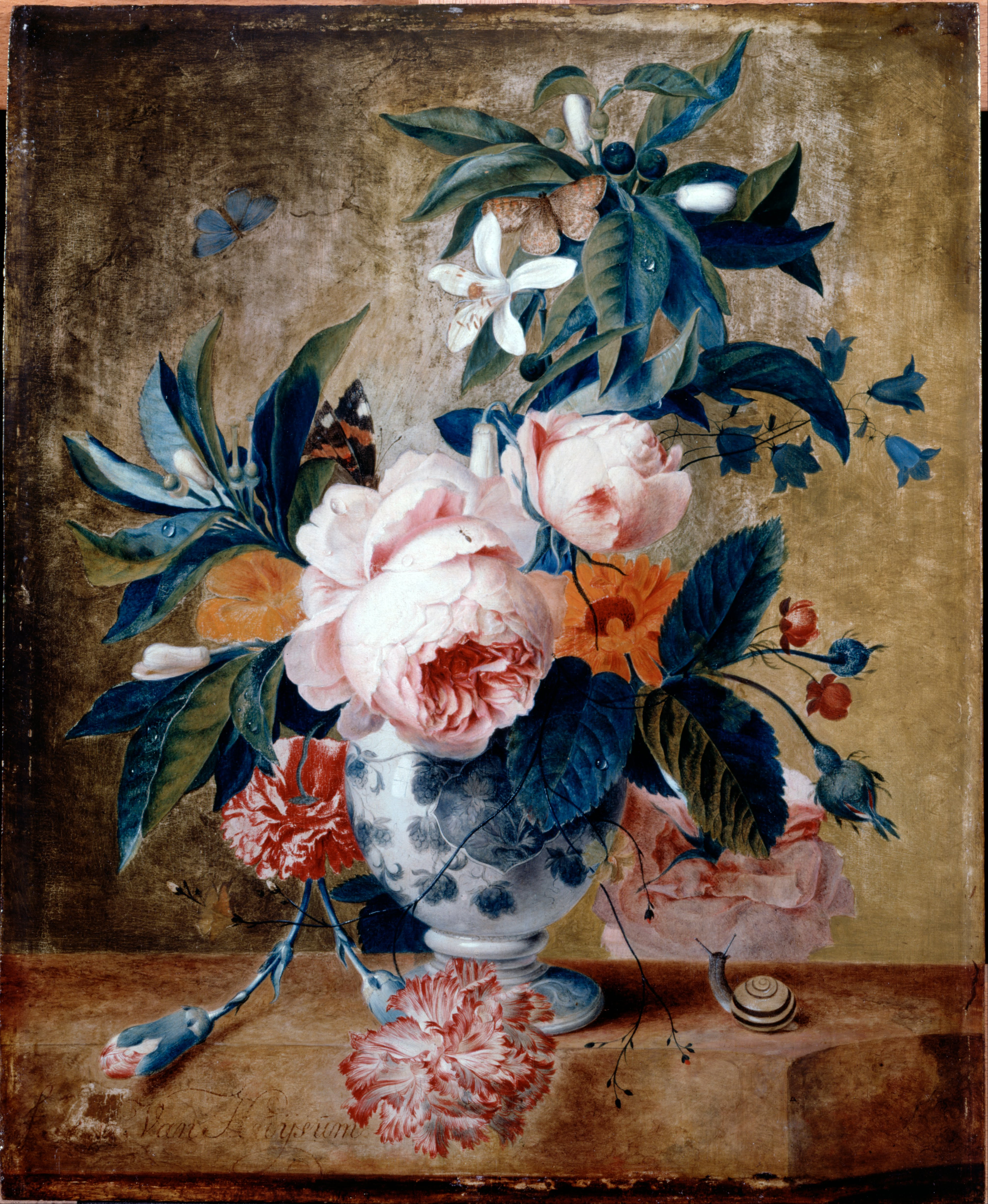
Flowers, Dulwich Picture Gallery

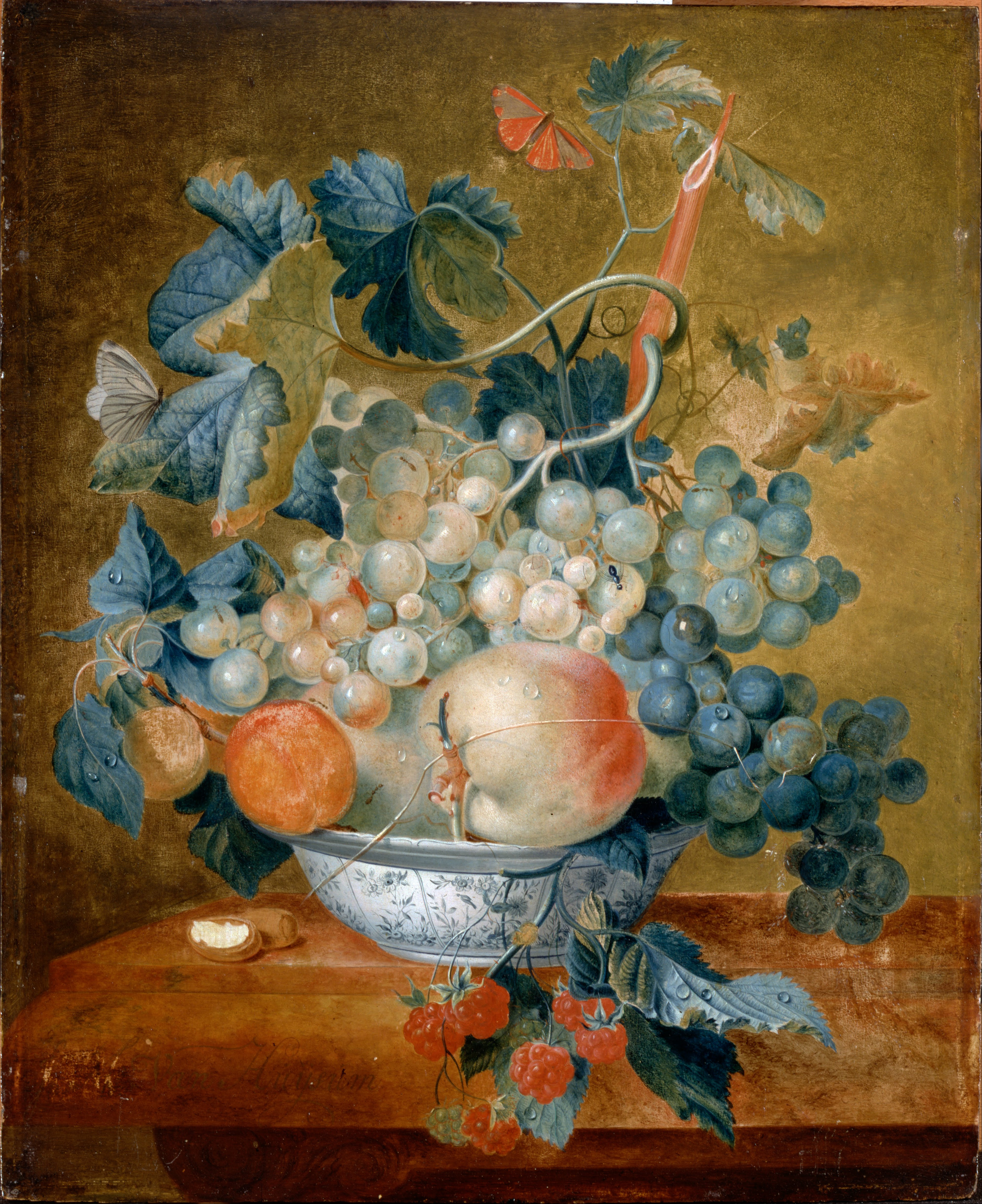
Fruit, Dulwich Picture Gallery

Sam Segal discovered a note about a pair of pendants purchased by Cornelis Ploos van Amstel in 1661 by F.M. van Huyzum which were as good as J. van Huyzum in an auction sale. The copyist Oswald Wijnen later made watercolour copies of these pendants that are now in the Teylers Museum:

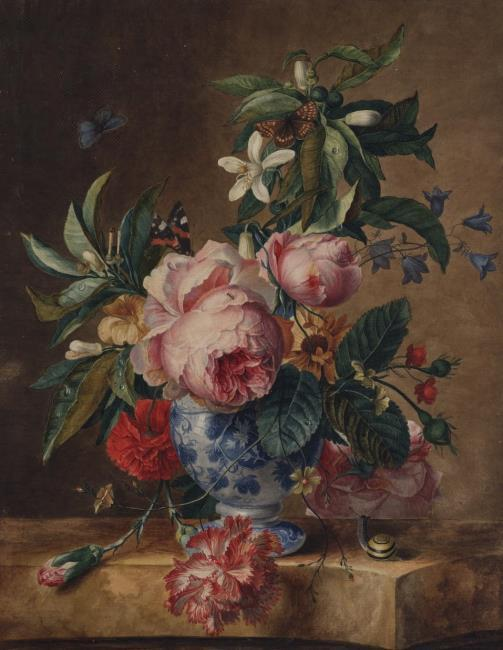
Flowers, Teylers Museum

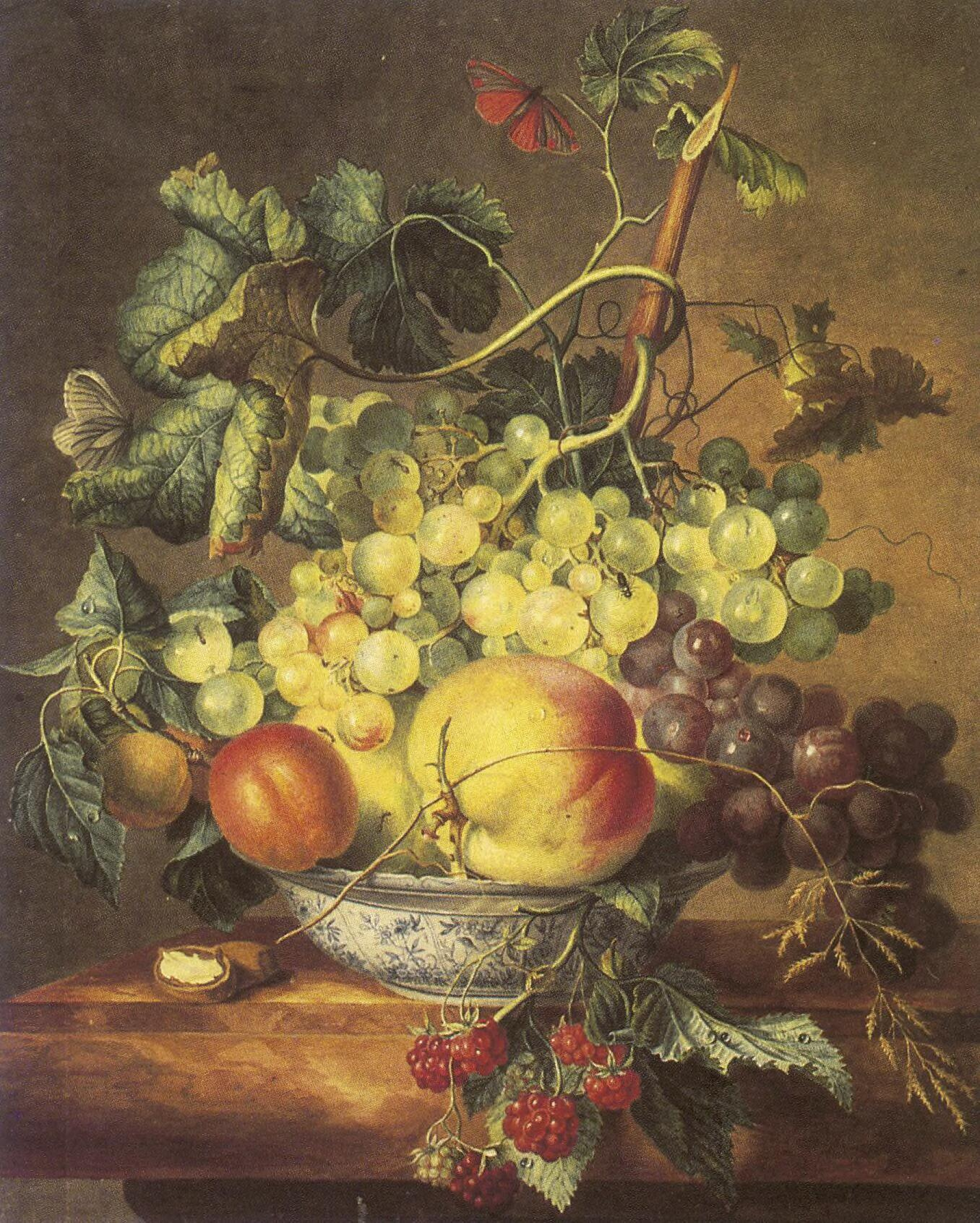
Fruit, Teylers Museum
