= Huizum =

Residential area in Friesland, Netherlands

Coordinates: 53°11′29″N 5°48′41″E

Coat of arms of Huizum

Huizum is a residential area of the municipality of Leeuwarden in the province of Friesland, Netherlands. It has approximately 9,000 inhabitants. Huizum was formerly part of Leeuwarderadeel and incorporates a former village.

== Description ==
Huizum has three sections: Huizum-West, Huizum-Oost and Huizum-Dorp (Huizum West, Huizum East and Huizum Village). Huizum-Dorp is a former village; Huizum village church, whose oldest section dates to the 12th century, was declared a Rijksmonument in 1967. Huizum-West was developed in the early 20th century. The Hollanderwijk section, built in 1914–1915, was designed by Willem Cornelis de Groot and in 2007 was declared a protected national monument in the category of villages and towns.

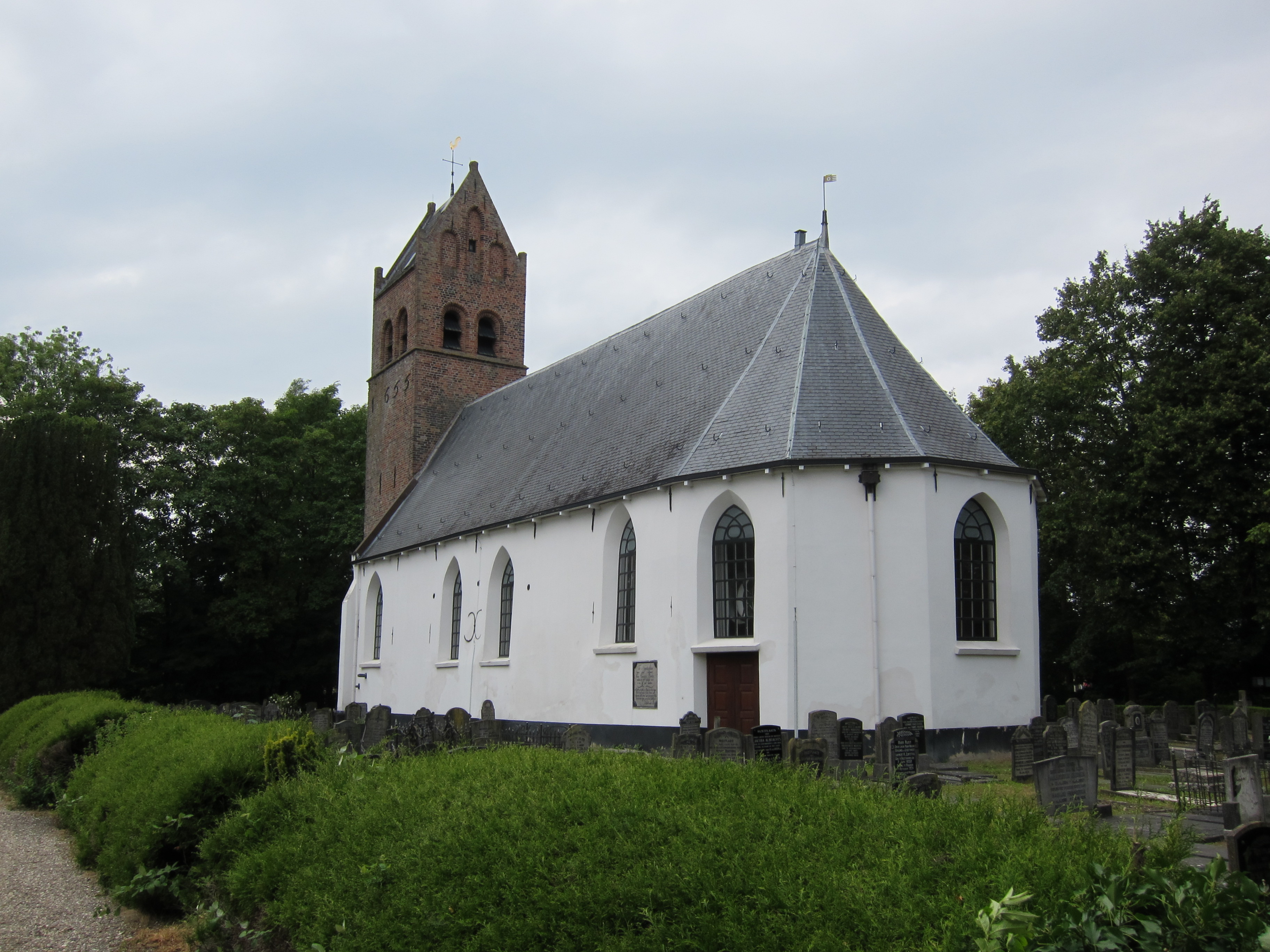
Village church

== History ==
Huizum-Dorp was built on a terp, indicating that it was inhabited before the creation of dykes around 1000 CE. The first written record of the settlement is in a letter dated 1149 from Wibald, Abbot of Corvey to the Bishop of Utrecht. In addition to Huizum, which means "by the houses", a reference to stinsen or residences of the nobility once located there, it has in the past been known as Husma, Hwsmanghae and Husum.

Huizum was formerly the administrative centre of Leeuwarderadeel. On 1 January 1944, during the Nazi German occupation, the southern section of Leeuwarderadeel was transferred to Leeuwarden; the town hall remained in Huizum until 1965.

== Notable people ==
- Bert Bakker
- Ted Meines
- van Huysum family of painters

== Slauerhoff and Huizum ==
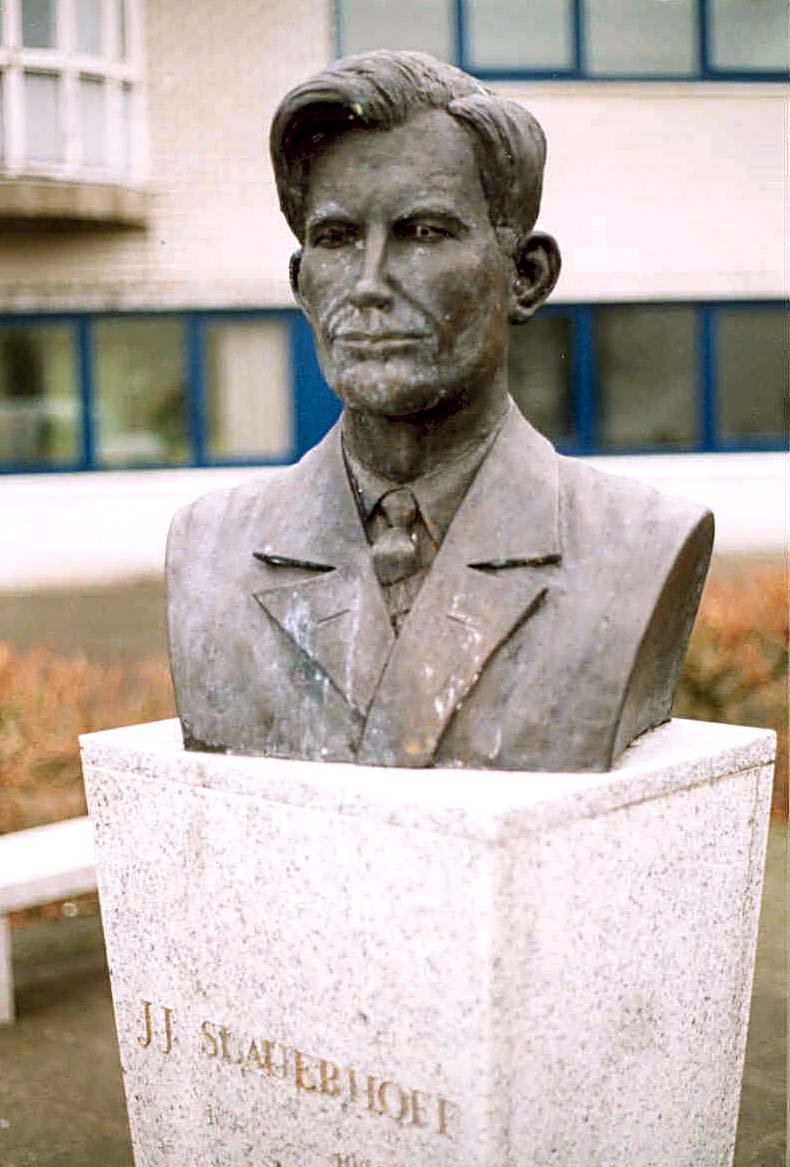
Sculpture of Slauerhoff in Huizum

The small village Huizum in Friesland hosts the annual Slauerhoff Lecture. The church in Huizum holds a bronze bust of Slauerhoff's head, made by Ben van der Geest. Several family members of the poet, including his parents, are buried at the Huizum cemetery. The tombstone plate with the names of Slauerhoff's parents has been standing on a pedestal at the entrance of the Dorpskerk ever since the grave was cleared. The tombstone has been given this prominent place because one of Slauerhoff's longest poems (In Memoriam Patris, with 34 stanzas) is dedicated to the burial of his father at the same cemetery.
