= Jacob van Huysum =

Dutch painter

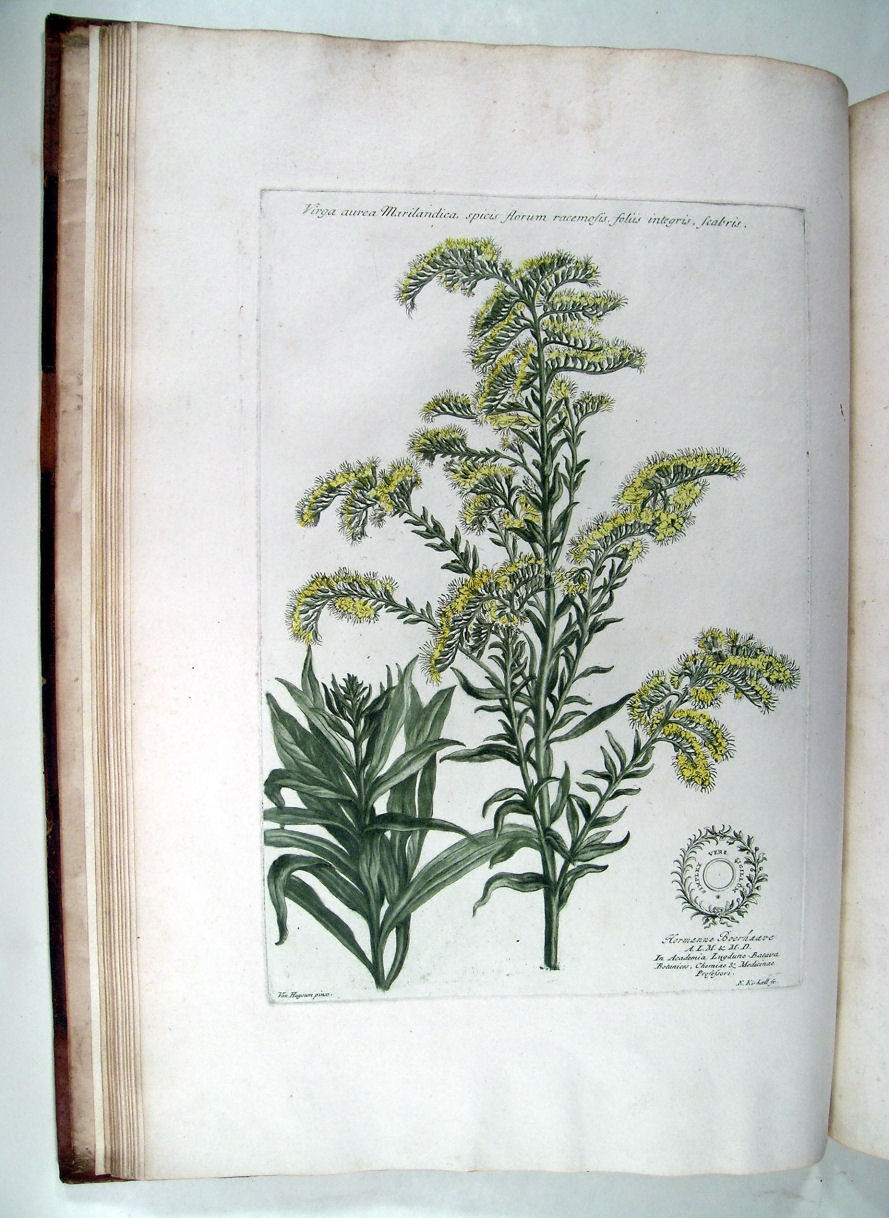
Solidago virga-aurea for the Historia Plantarum Rariorum

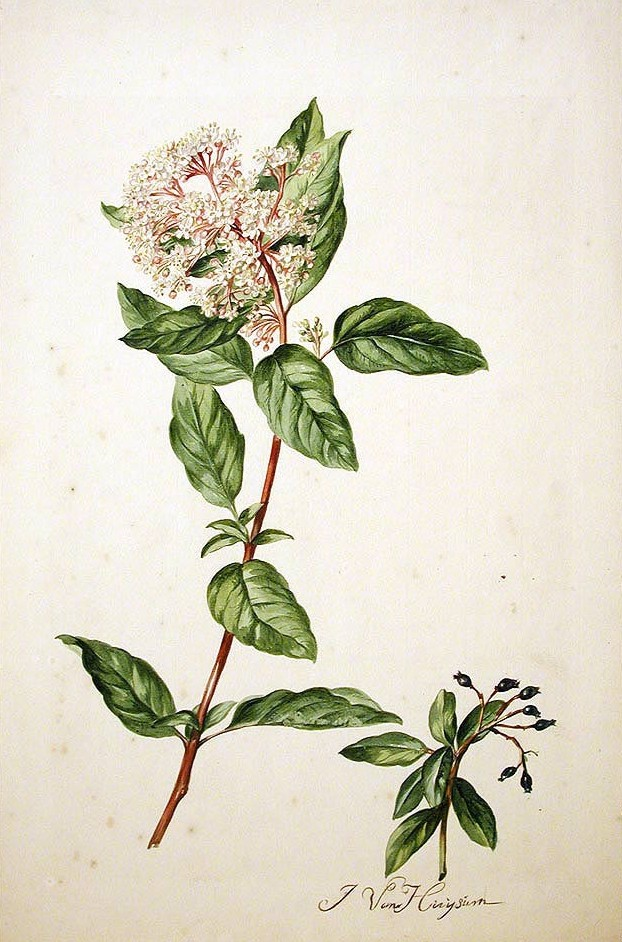
Viburnum tinus for the Catalogus Plantarum

Jacob van Huysum (1688–1740) was an 18th-century botanical painter from the Dutch Republic who moved to the Kingdom of Great Britain in 1721.

== Career ==
Van Huysum was baptized 25 February 1688 in Amsterdam. Both his father Justus van Huysum (1659-1716), and his brother Jan van Huysum (1682-1749), were celebrated flower painters. His manner of painting was very like that of his brother. One source says that “his chief merit was in copying so well his brother Jan’s pictures, that his copies have been mistaken for original works by Jan.” Another art historian states that while his work is less finished and less delicately colored than Jan’s, his paintings still have “great merit” in their own right.

His approach to botanical illustration, while preserving botanical accuracy, captured a more painterly aspect of his subject. This contrasts with the meticulously exact mode of Georg Dionysius Ehret, his contemporary colleague.

Jacob arrived in England in about 1721, and for a while lived in the house of his patron, Mr. Lockyear of South Sea House. Later he enjoyed the patronage of Sir Robert Walpole, who befriended him, and commissioned him to paint decorative works for his house at Houghton in Norfolk. More importantly he produced most of the 50 illustrations for John Martyn's Historia Plantarum Rariorum (London: 1728-1738), and all the drawings for Catalogus Plantarum, an index of trees, shrubs, plants and flowers (London: 1730). His pupil was Louis Fabritius Dubourg.

== Historia Plantarum Rariorum ==
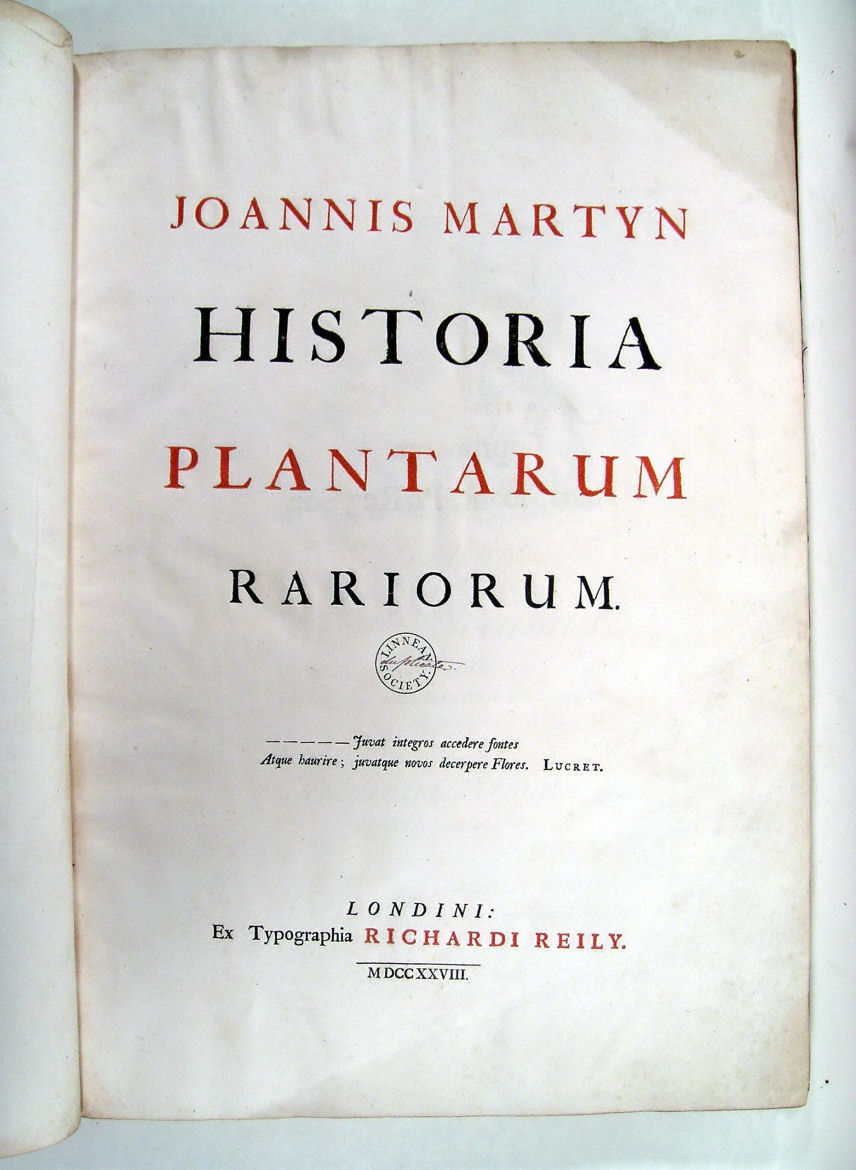
The Historia Plantarum Rariorum

The Historia Plantarum Rariorum depicted plants from the Chelsea Physic Garden and the Cambridge Botanic Garden. These plants had come from the Cape of Good Hope, North America, the West Indies, and Mexico. Elisha Kirkall produced the mezzotint engravings. Each plate was dedicated to a patron and showed an engraved coat-of-arms or monogram. Besides van Huysum, other artists were William Houstoun, Massey, G. Sartorys, and R. Sartorius. The work was published in five parts of ten plates each between 1728 and 1737, and was sold by subscription. The venture was not a financial success and publication ceased in 1737.

== See also ==
- List of florilegia and botanical codices
