= Justus van Huysum the Younger =

Dutch painter of battle scenes (1684–1706)

Justus van Huysum II, sometimes styled Justus II van Huysum or Justus van Huysum the Younger (1684–1706) was a member of the van Huysum Dutch painting family. He painted “battle-pieces with extraordinary spirit and facility.” He died relatively young but his artworks are in the Herzog Anton Ulrich Museum in Braunschweig, Germany and the Rijksmuseum in Amsterdam.

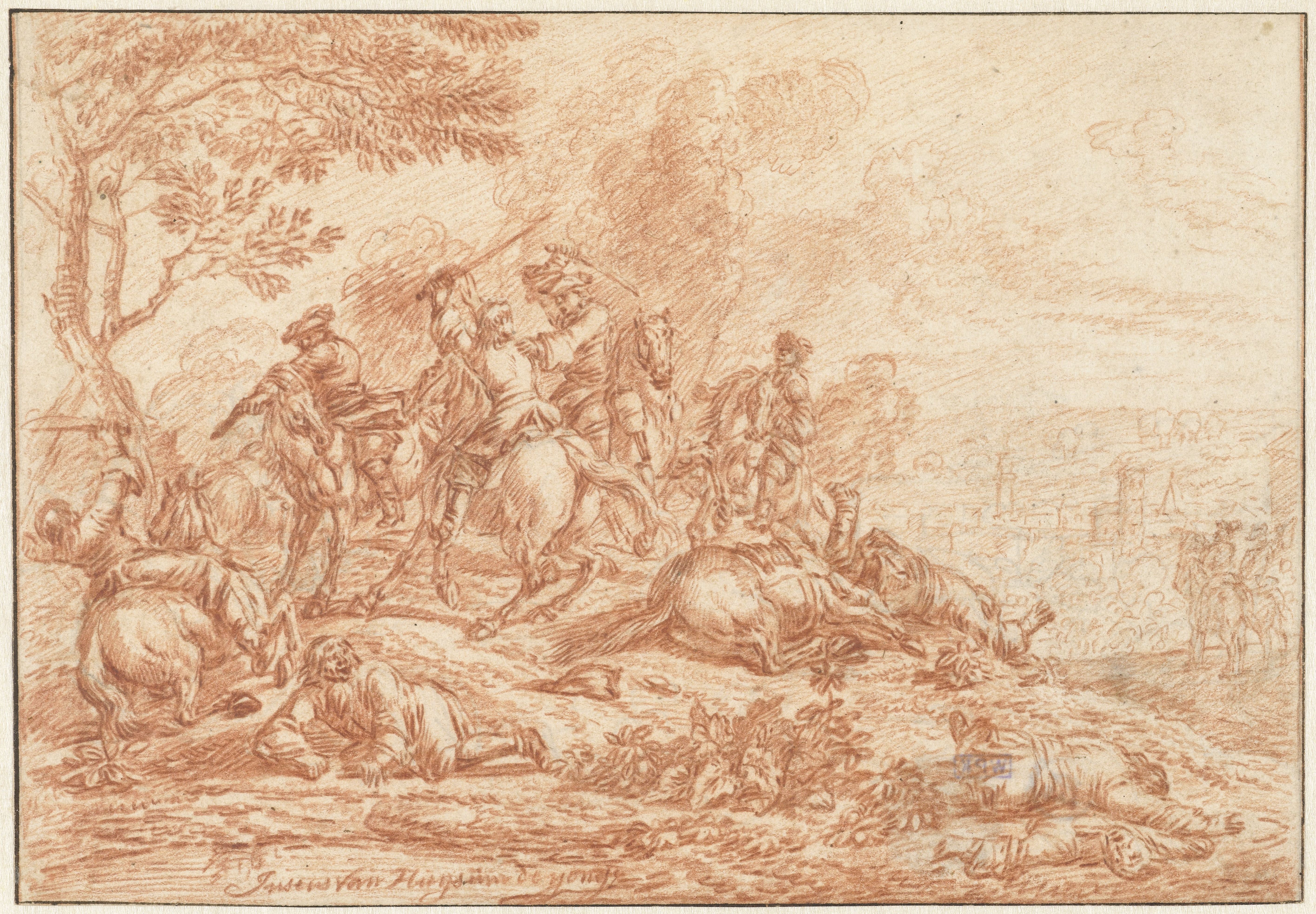
Cavalry battle, Rijksmuseum
