= List of windmills in Friesland (R–S) =

List of windmills in Friesland, Netherlands

A list of windmills in the Dutch province of Friesland, locations beginning R–S.

== R ==
Location	Name of mill	Type	Built	Notes	Photograph
Raard	Polder 39a 53°19′04″N 5°56′22″E		Before 1854	Demolished before 1927.	
Raard	Polder 41; 53°19′47″N 5°55′55″E	Grondzeiler	1820	Demolished c.1918.	
Raard	Polder 42; 53°20′02″N 5°55′42″E	Grondzeiler	Before 1832	Demolished before 1926.	
Raard	Polder De Keegen; 53°19′33″N 5°57′48″E	Spinnenkopmolen	Before 1854	Demolished post-1928.	
Raard	Polder Oost- en Westdongeradeel; Molen van Damzijl; 53°19′35″N 5°57′52″E	Grondzeiler	1871	Demolished 1932.	
Raard	Polder Raarderterp; 53°19′33″N 5°56′35″E		Before 1930	Demolished post-1952.	
Raerd	Molen van Hessel Harings; 53°05′28″N 5°46′21″E		Before 1832	Demolished post 1850.	
Raerd	Molen van Phillipus van Nassau; 53°05′24″N 5°45′16″E		Before 1832	Demolished post-1850.	
Raerd	Molen van Tjalling van Eijsinga; 53°05′03″N 5°45′46″E		Before 1832	Demolished post-1850.	
Raerd	Molen van Tjalling van Eijsinga; 53°05′57″N 5°45′20″E		Before 1832	Demolished before 1850.	
Raerd	Polder 131; 53°06′06″N 5°46′03″E		Before 1832	Demolished before 1929.	
Raerd	Polder 132; 53°06′08″N 5°45′36″E		Before 1832	Demolished before 1929.	
Raerd	Polder 133; 53°06′34″N 5°45′11″E	Spinnenkopmolen	Between 1832 and 1850	Demolished post-1982.	
Raerd	Polder 134; 53°05′50″N 5°44′49″E		Before 1832	Demolished before 1929.	
Raerd	Polder 135; 53°05′56″N 5°45′10″E		Before 1832	Demolished 1929.	
Raerd	Polder 136; 53°05′48″N 5°44′54″E		Before 1832	Demolished beforfe 1929.	
Raerd	Polder 137; 53°06′00″N 5°46′02″E		Before 1832	Demolished before 1929.	
Raerd	Polder 138; 53°05′59″N 5°46′44″E		Before 1832	Demolished before 1929.	
Raerd	Polder 139; 53°06′09″N 5°46′44″E		Before 1832	Demolished before 1929.	
Raerd	Polder 140; 53°05′48″N 5°46′47″E		Before 1832	Demolished before 1929.	
Raerd	Polder 141; 53°05′50″N 5°46′33″E		Before 1832	Demolished before 1929.	
Raerd	Polder 142; 53°05′34″N 5°46′25″E		Before 1832	Demolished before 1929.	
Raerd	Polder 143; 53°05′26″N 5°46′20″E		1850	Demolished post-1930.	
Raerd	Polder 146; 53°05′27″N 5°45′57″E		Before 1832	Demolished before 1929.	
Raerd	Polder 148; Molen van Koopmans; 53°05′43″N 5°45′33″E	Grondzeiler	Before 1832	Demolished 1941.	
Raerd	Polder 149; 53°05′32″N 5°44′41″E		Before 1832	Demolished before 1929.	
Raerd	Polder 220; 53°06′03″N 5°43′42″E		Before 1832	Demolished before 1929.	
Raerd	Polder 221; 53°05′40″N 5°44′26″E		Before 1832	Demolished before 1929.	
Raerd	Polder 221a 53°05′43″N 5°44′15″E	Before 1832	Demolished before 1929.		
Raerd	Polder 222; 53°05′51″N 5°44′39″E		Before 1832	Demolished before 1929.	
Raerd	Polder 229; 53°06′04″N 5°46′53″E		Before 1832	Demolished before 1929.	
Raerd	Polder 230; 53°06′00″N 5°46′58″E		Before 1832	Demolished before 1929.	
Raerd	Polder 231; 53°05′45″N 5°47′33″E		Before 1832	Demolished before 1924.	
Raerd	Polder 232; 53°05′24″N 5°46′51″E		Before 1832	Demolished before 1924.	
Raerd	Polder 233; 53°05′23″N 5°47′29″E		Before 1832	Demolished before 1924.	
Reahûs	Molen van de Gereformeerde Kerk; 53°04′34″N 5°37′47″E	Spinnenkopmolen	Before 1832		
Reahûs	Molen van de Gereformeerde Kerk; 53°04′28″N 5°37′57″E	Spinnenkopmolen	Before 1832	Demolished before 1850.	
Reahûs	Polder 266; 53°48′09″N 5°38′46″E	Grondzeiler	Before 1832	Demolished c.1850.	
Reahûs	Polder 269; 53°04′53″N 5°38′32″E	Grondzeiler	Before 1560	Demolished post-1930.	
Reahûs	Polder 270; 53°04′39″N 5°38′12″E	Spinnenkopmolen	Before 1832	Demolished before 1928.	
Reahûs	Polder 271; 53°04′23″N 5°38′13″E	Spinnenkopmolen	Before 1832	Demolished 1922.	
Reahûs	Polder 272; 53°04′07″N 5°38′32″E	Spinnenkopmolen	Before 1832	Demolished before 1909.	
Reahûs	Polder 273; 53°04′14″N 5°38′46″E	Spinnenkopmolen	Before 1832	Demolished before 1922.	
Reahûs	Polder 323; 53°04′30″N 5°37′45″E	Grondzeiler	Before 1832	Demolished post-1930.	
Reahûs	Polder 331; 53°04′34″N 5°37′47″E	Grondzeiler	1861	Demolished 1950.	
Readtsjerk	De Hoop; 53°15′59″N 5°55′49″E	Grondzeiler	1911		
Readtsjerk	Molen van de Kerk; 53°01′37″N 5°54′29″E		Before 1832	Demolished before 1850.	
Readtsjerk	Molen van de Pastorij; 53°15′16″N 5°56′10″E	Spinnenkopmolen	Before 1832	Demolished post-1850.	
Readtsjerk	Molen van Geert van der Ploeg; 53°16′00″N 5°54′56″E		Before 1832	Demolished post-1850.	
Readtsjerk	Molen van Godard van Gent; 53°15′52″N 5°55′30″E		Before 1832	Demolished post-1850.	
Readtsjerk	Molen van J. H. van Boelens; 53°16′07″N 5°54′59″E		Before 1832	Demolished post-1850.	
Readtsjerk	Molen van J. S. T. Schwartzenburg en Hohenlangsberg; 53°16′09″N 5°54′24″E		Before 1832	Demolished before 1850.	
Readtsjerk	Molen van Nanne de Boer; 53°15′28″N 5°56′17″E		Before 1832	Demolished before 1850.	
Readtsjerk	Molen van Pieter van der Meer; 53°16′10″N 5°54′14″E		Before 1832	Demolished before 1850.	
Readtsjerk	Molen van Pieter Veenstra; 53°15′32″N 5°56′30″E	Spinnenkopmolen	Before 1832	Demolished post-1850.	
Readtsjerk	Molen van Sjoerd Planting; 53°15′54″N 5°56′06″E		Before 1832	Demolished before 1850.	
Readtsjerk	Molen van Tientje van der Woude; 53°15′32″N 5°56′01″E		Before 1832	Demolished post=-1850.	
Readtsjerk	Polder 22; 53°16′27″N 5°54′10″E	Grondzeiler	Before 1854	Demolished before 1926.	
Readtsjerk	Polder 117; 53°15′51″N 5°55′00″E		Before 1832	Burnt down 1892.	
Readtsjerk	Polder 117; Van der Veen's Polder; Sytsma's Polder; 53°15′51″N 5°55′00″E	Grondzeiler	1892	Demolished 1966.	
Readtsjerk	Polder 168; 53°15′25″N 5°56′10″E		Before 1854	Demolished before 1926.	
Readtsjerk	Polder 168a 5°19′33″N 5°56′20″E	Grondzeiler	1890	Blown down 1940.	
Readtsjerk	Polder de Honderd en Woudgaren; Roodkerker Polder; 53°15′59″N 5°55′49″E	Grondzeiler	1850	Demolished 1911.	
Readtsjerk	Polder Het Noorder Rietveld; 53°16′10″N 5°56′39″E	Grondzeiler	Before 1878	Demolished 1928.	
Readtsjerk	53°15′09″N 5°55′44″E		Before 1854	Demolished before 1926.	
Readtsjerk	Rietveld; 53°15′54″N 5°56′08″E		1850	Demolished before 1930.	
Reduzum	Molen van Eritia van Sminia; 53°06′49″N 5°46′48″E		Before 1832	Demolished before 1850.	
Reduzum	Molen van Jr. M. P. D. van Sytzama; 53°06′47″N 5°46′55″E		Before 1832	Demolished before 1850.	
Reduzum	Molen van Maria van Sminia; 53°07′11″N 5°47′42″E		Before 1832	Demolished before 1850.	
Reduzum	Molen van Petrus Bergsma; 53°06′56″N 5°48′11″E		Before 1832	Demolished before 1850.	
Reduzum	Molen van Philip Vegelin van Claerbergen; 53°07′00″N 5°47′39″E		Before 1832	Demolished post-1930.	
Reduzum	Polder 27; 53°07′07″N 5°47′07″E		Before 1832	Demolished before 1928.	
Reduzum	Polder 28; 53°07′21″N 5°47′31″E		Before 1876	Demolished between 1924 and 1929.	
Reduzum	Polder 29; 53°06′48″N 5°47′02″E		Before 1832	Demolished before 1924.	
Reduzum	Polder 30; 53°07′02″N 5°47′36″E		Before 1832	Demolished before 1924.	
Reduzum	Polder 31; 53°06′53″N 5°47′41″E		Before 1832	Demolished before 1924.	
Reduzum	Polder 32; 53°07′04″N 5°47′39″E		Before 1876	Demolished between 1924 and 1929.	
Reduzum	Polder 128; 53°06′45″N 5°46′45″E		Before 1832	Demolished before 1928.	
Reduzum	Polder 130; 53°06′13″N 5°46′24″E	Paltrokmolen	Before 1832	Demolished before 1928.	
Reduzum	Roordahuizumer Nieuwland; 53°06′50″N 5°46′30″E	Grondzeiler	1842	Burnt down 1936.	
Reduzum	Windlust; 53°07′08″N 5°47′36″E	Stellingmolen	1865	Demolished 1913.	
Ried	Molen van Dirk Fontein; 53°13′30″N 5°35′11″E		Before 1832	Demolished before 1850.	
Ried	Polder Anema; 53°13′12″N 5°35′51″E		Before 1832	Demolished post-1850.	
Ried	Polder Roorda; 53°13′25″N 5°36′31″E		Before 1832	Demolished before 1850.	
Rien	Korenmolen van Rien	Standerdmolen	Before 1543	Demolished post-1664.	
Rien	Polder 249; 53°05′52″N 5°39′47″E	Spinnenkopmolen	Before 1832	Demolished before 1929.	
Rien	Polder 265; 53°05′33″N 5°39′21″E	Spinnenkopmolen	Before 1832	Demolished 1907.	
Rien	Polder 265; 53°05′33″N 5°39′21″E	Spinnenkopmolen	1907	Demolished between 1952 and 1957.	
Rien	Polder 338; 53°05′23″N 5°38′33″E	Spinnenkopmolen	Before 1832	Demolished before 1929.	
Rien	Polder 338a 53°05′27″N 5°38′46″E	Spinnenkopmolen	Before 1832	Demolished before 1850.	
Rien	Polder 339; 53°05′31″N 5°39′32″E	Spinnenkopmolen	Before 1832	Demolished post-1929.	
Rien	Polder 341; 53°06′00″N 5°39′41″E	Spinnenkopmolen	Before 1832	Demolished before 1929.	
Rien	Polder 342; 53°06′10″N 5°39′28″E	Spinnenkopmolen	Demolished before 1929.		
Rijs	Molen van Constantia Rengers; 52°52′19″N 5°29′28″E		Before 1832	Demolished post-1850.	
Rijs	Rijsterpolder; 52°52′37″N 5°29′56″E	Grondzeiler	Before 1720	Blown down 1930.	
Rijtseterp	Rijtseterperpolder; 53°02′23″N 5°27′37″E		Before 1729.	Demolished before 1850.	
Rinsumageest	De Klarkampstermolen; 53°18′19″N 5°02′16″E	Grondzeiler	1862		
Rinsumageest	Windmotor Rinsumageest	Iron windpump		Molendatabase (in Dutch); De Hollandsche Molen (in Dutch)	
Rinsumageest	Gerrit Gaukes Polder; 53°18′10″N 5°54′25″E	Spinnenkopmolen	1718	Demolished between 1932 and 1952.	
Rinsumageest	Molen van Fokke Posthuma; 53°17′32″N 5°54′02″E	Spinnenkopmolen	Before 1832	Demolished before 1850.	
Rinsumageest	Molen van Hepke Hoekstra; 53°18′04″N 5°57′30″E		Before 1832	Demolished before 1850.	
Rinsumageest	Molen van Klaas Kooijstra; 53°18′08″N 5°55′12″E		Before 1832	Demolished before 1850/	
Rinsumageest	Molen van Klaas Uiterdijk; 53°18′09″N 5°57′29″E		Before 1832	Demolished before 1850.	
Rinsumageest	Molen van M. C. F. J. de Rotte; 53°17′28″N 5°57′02″E		Before 1832	Demolished before 1850.	
Rinsumageest	Molen van Rentze Sinia; 53°17′31″N 5°56′50″E		Before 1832	Demolished before 1850.	
Rinsumageest	Molen van Sipke en Jan Hoogterp; 53°18′08″N 5°54′16″E	Spinnenkopmolen	Before 1832	Demolished before 1850.	
Rinsumageest	Molen van Tjepke Postma; 53°17′21″N 5°56′28″E		Before 1832	Demolished before 1850.	
Rinsumageest	Polder 24; 53°17′17″N 5°56′30″E		Before 1854	Demolished before 1926.	
Rinsumageest	Polder 25; 53°17′15″N 5°56′32″E		Before 1854	Demolished before 1926.	
Rinsumageest	Polder 26; 53°17′34″N 5°57′14″E		Before 1850	Demolished before 1928.	
Rinsumageest	Polder 27; 53°17′22″N 5°56′13″E		Before 1854	Demolished post-1926.	
Rinsumageest	Polder 28; 53°17′34″N 5°56′23″E		Before 1854	Demolished before 1927.	
Rinsumageest	Polder 31; 53°18′11″N 5°54′05″E	Grondzeiler	Before 1832	Demolished 1949/50.	
Rinsumageest	Polder 32; 53°18′04″N 5°54′37″E	Grondzeiler	Before 1832	Demolished between 1931 and 1947.	
Rinsumageest	Polder 33; Polder Van der Veen; 53°18′14″N 5°55′14″E		Before 1854	Demolished post-1930.	
Rinsumageest	Polder 34; 53°18′30″N 5°54′54″E	Spinnenkopmolen	Before 1832	Demolished before 1930.	
Rinsumageest	Polder 35a 53°18′25″N 5°55′27″E		Before 1850	Demolished post-1930.	
Rinsumageest	Polder 43; Polder Buitenwiel; 53°18′06″N 5°56′19″E	Grondzeiler	Before 1832	Movedn within Rinsumageest 1893.	
Rinsumageest	Polder 43a 53°18′00″N 5°56′44″E	Spinnenkopmolen	Before 1832	Demolished post-1926.	
Rinsumageest	Polder 44; 53°18′06″N 5°56′48″E		Before 1832	Demolished before 1926.	
Rinsumageest	Polder 44a 53°18′07″N 5°56′53″E	Spinnenkopmolen	Before 1832	Demolished post-1930.	
Rinsumageest	Polder 45; 53°18′17″N 5°57′23″E		Before 1854	Demolished post-1927.	
Rinsumageest	Watermolen van Jan Visser; 53°16′30″N 5°58′04″E		Before 1832	Demolished before 1850.	
Rinsumageest	Korenmolen van Rinsumageest; 53°17′52″N 5°57′02″E	Standerdmolen	Before 1477	Blown down 1762.	
Rinsumageest	Molen van Gerben Faber; 53°17′32″N 5°57′17″E		Before 1832	Demolished before 1850.	
Rinsumageest	Molen van Johannes Annema; 53°17′34″N 5°56′05″E		Before 1832	Demolished before 1850.	
Rinsumageest	Molen van M. C. F. J. de Rotte; 53°17′16″N 5°56′30″E	Spinnenkopmolen	Before 1832	Demolished post-1850.	
Rinsumageest	Molen van M. C. F J. de Rotte; 53°17′38″N 5°56′19″E		Before 1832	Demolished post-1850.	
Rinsumageest	53°18′16″N 5°54′45″E		1850	Demolished post-1930.	
Rinsumageest	53°17′31″N 5°57′23″E		Before 1850	Demolished before 1930.	
Rinsumageest	Waterschap Het Geetsmer Noorder- en Zuiderveld; 53°17′19″N 5°55′06″E	Grondzeiler	1895	Demolished before 1961.	
Rohel	Grote Sint Johannesgaster Veenpolder; Meerzigt; Nr. 6; 52°54′49″N 5°49′38″E	Grondzeiler	1857	Burnt down 1918.	
Rohel	52°55′00″N 5°49′59″E	Weidemolen	Before 1909	Demolished post-1934.	
Rohel	52°55′02″N 5°49′37″E	Weidemolen	Before 1909	Demolished before 1934.	
Rohel	52°55′04″N 5°50′40″E	Weidemolen	Before 1909	Demolished before 1934.	
Rohel	Molen van Evert Post; 52°54′50″N 5°49′40″E	Spinnenkopmolen	Before 1832	Demolished before 1850.	
Rohel	Molen van Jan Wind; 52°54′58″N 5°50′07″E	Spinnenkopmolen	Before 1832	Demolished before 1850.	
Rohel	Onderpolder 2; 52°54′50″N 5°50′26″E		Before 1877	Demolished c.1932.	
Rohel	Onderpolder 2; 52°54′55″N 5°49′29″E	Tjasker	Before 1877	Demolished before 1934.	
Rohel	Polder 1D; 52°55′20″N 5°50′15″E	Spinnenkopmolen	Before 1832	Demolished before 1850.	
Rohel	52°54′52″N 5°50′31″E		Before 1877	Demolished before 1909.	
Rotstergaast	Grote Sint Johannesgaster Veenpolder; Gaastzigt; Nr. 5; 52°54′14″N 5°54′46″E	Grondzeiler	1857	Demolished 1953.	
Rotstergaast	Grote Sint Johannesgaster Veenpolder, part a 52°54′14″N 5°53′49″E		Before 1832	Demolished post-1850.	
Rotstergaast	Grote Sint Johannesgaster Veenpolder, part b 52°54′10″N 5°53′20″E		Before 1832	Demolished post-1850.	
Rotstergaast	Grote Sint Johannesgaster Veenpolder, part c 52°53′58″N 5°53′08″E		Before 1832	Demolished post-1850.	
Rotstergaast	Grote Sint Johannesgaster Veenpolder, part d 52°53′48″N 5°52′51″E		Before 1832	Demolished post-1850.	
Rotstergaast	Grote Sint Johannesgaster Veenpolder, part e 52°53′36″N 5°52′48″E		Before 1832	Demolished post-1850.	
Rotstergaast	Polder 4a 52°55′26″N 5°55′15″E		Before 1877	Demolished post-1922.	
Rotstergaast	Polder 4b 52°55′08″N 5°55′25″E		1877	Demolished post-1922.	
Rotstergaast	Polder 5; 52°54′37″N 5°53′38″E		Before 1877	Demolished before 1932.	
Rotstergaast	Polder 13; 52°54′05″N 5°54′25″E		Before 1873	Demolished before 1929.	
Rotstergaast	Polder 14; 52°54′12″N 5°53′23″E		Before 1832	Demolished between 1850 and 1929.	
Rotstergaast	Polder Friese Verzekering Mij voor Schepen; 52°54′50″N 5°56′05″E	Spinnenkopmolen	1926	Demolished between 1960 and 1964.	
Rotsterhaule	Molen van Karst Woudstra; 52°54′43″N 5°52′00″E		Before 1832	Demolished before 1850.	
Rotsterhaule	Molen van Sytze van der Veen; 52°55′12″N 5°51′47″E		Before 1832	Demolished before 1850.	
Rotsterhaule	Molen van Thys Klomp; 52°55′07″N 5°51′28″E		Before 1832	Demolished before 1850.	
Rotsterhaule	Molen van Thys Klomp; 52°54′52″N 5°51′55″E		Before 1832	Demolished before 1850.	
Rotsterhaule	Polder 1C; 52°55′23″N 5°49′54″E	Weidemolen	1832	Demolished before 1877.	
Rottevalle	De Rot; Ald Rot; 53°08′50″N 6°05′54″E	Standerdmolen	Before 1664	Demolished 1921.	
Rottevalle	53°08′47″N 6°06′26″E		1860	Demolished post-1900.	
Rottum	Molen van Frans van Scheltinga; 53°56′22″N 5°54′18″E		Before 1832	Demolished before 1850.	
Rottum	Molen van Hendrik Wind; Korenmolen; 53°56′17″N 5°53′53″E		Before 1832	Demolished post-1864.	
Rottum	Polder 3a 53°55′57″N 5°53′21″E		1877	Demolished before 1932.	
Rottum	Polder 30; 53°56′01″N 5°53′21″E	Spinnenkopmolen	Before 1832	Demolished before 1909.	
Rottum	Polder 31; 53°55′59″N 5°53′27″E	Spinnenkopmolen	Before 1832	Demolished before 1909.	
Rottum	Polder 32; 53°56′14″N 5°52′43″E		Before 1832	Demolished post-1850.	
Rottum	Polder 33; 53°56′30″N 5°52′45″E		1877	Demolished post-1932.	
Rottum	Polder 33a 53°56′32″N 5°54′16″E		Before 1832	Demolished before 1932.	
Rottum	Polder 33b 53°56′33″N 5°53′53″E		Before 1832	Demolished before 1932.	
Rottum	Polder 34; 53°56′51″N 5°52′41″E		1877	Demolished before 1932.	
Rottum	Polder 37; 53°56′31″N 5°52′11″E		Before 1877	Demolished before 1932.	
Rottum	Rotstermolen; 53°55′58″N 5°53′41″E	Standerdmolen	Before 1507	Demolished between 1813 and 1816.	
Ryptsjerk	Himriksmolen; 53°13′09″N 5°53′09″E	Spinnenkopmolen	1952	Blown down 1972. Rebuilt at Tytsjerk 1976.	
Ryptsjerk	Ypey Mole; 53°13′21″N 5°54′05″E	Grondzeiler	1858		
Ryptsjerk	Tjasker van Mulder; 53°13′13″N 5°53′15″E	Boktjasker	1954	Moved to Augustinusga 1972.	
Ryptsjerk	Molen van Age Looxma. 53°13′08″N 5°53′57″E		Before 1832	Demolished before 1850.	
Ryptsjerk	Molen van Doije Hoekstra; 53°14′17″N 5°55′41″E		Before 1832	Demolished before 1850.	
Ryptsjerk	Molen van Eelke Edzes; 53°13′43″N 5°57′20″E		Before 1832	Demolished before 1850.	
Ryptsjerk	Molen van Gerben van der Feer; 53°13′39″N 5°55′39″E		Before 1832	Demolished post-1850.	
Ryptsjerk	Molen van Gerben van der Feer; 53°13′33″N 5°55′58″E		Before 1832	Demolished post-1850.	
Ryptsjerk	Molen van Hijlke Postma; 53°13′39″N 5°55′14″E		Before 1832	Demolished post-1850.	
Ryptsjerk	Molen van Jr. Frans van Eijsinga; 53°13′34″N 5°55′16″E		Before 1832	Demolished post-1850.	
Ryptsjerk	Molen van Oene Hogenbrug; 53°13′12″N 5°54′51″E		Before 1832	Demolished before 1850.	
Ryptsjerk	Molen van Pieter Veninga; 53°13′28″N 5°56′09″E		Before 1832	Demolished before 1850.	
Ryptsjerk	Molen van Pieter Visscher; 53°13′34″N 5°57′02″E		Before 1832	Demolished before 1850.	
Ryptsjerk	Molen van Willem van Vierssen; 53°13′36″N 5°55′14″E		Before 1832	Demolished post-1850.	
Ryptsjerk	Grote Wielen; 53.°N 5.°E	Paaltjasker	1976	Blown down 1995.	
Ryptsjerk	Polder 94; 53°13′07″N 5°51′31″E		Before 1832	Demolished before 1926.	
Ryptsjerk	Polder 95; 53°13′13″N 5°53′56″E	Weidemolen	1850	Demolished post-1874.	
Ryptsjerk	Polder 95a 53°13′18″N 5°53′56″E	Weidemolen	1850	demolished post-1874.	
Ryptsjerk	Polder 97; 53°13′32″N 5°53′04″E	Spinnenkopmolen	Before 1832	Demolished post-1930.	
Ryptsjerk	Polder 161; 53°13′23″N 5°56′04″E	Spinnenkopmolen	Before 1832	Demolished post-1928.	
Ryptsjerk	Polder Rijperkerk; 53°13′30″N 5°55′12″E		Before 1832	Demolished between 1850 and 1874.	
Ryptsjerk	Polder Rijperkerk; 53°13′11″N 5°55′05″E	Weidemolen	Between 1832 and 1850	Demolished before 1874.	
Ryptsjerk	Polder Rijperkerk; 53°13′44″N 5°54′04″E		Before 1832	Demolished post-1850.	
Ryptsjerk	Polder Rijperkerk; 53°13′27″N 5°55′27″E		Before 1832	Demolished 1874.	
Ryptsjerk	Polder Rijperkerk; 53°13′58″N 5°55′41″E	Weidemolen	Between 1832 and 1850	Demolished before 1874.	
Ryptsjerk	Polder Rijperkerk; 53°13′49″N 5°55′36″E	Weidemolen	Between 1832 and 1850	Demolished before 1874.	
Ryptsjerk	Rijperkerkermolen; 53°13′33″N 5°53′50″E	Grondzeiler	1864	Burnt down 1968.	

== S ==
Location	Name of mill	Type	Built	Notes	Photograph
Sandfirden	Molen van Douwe de Boer; 52°59′23″N 5°31′08″E		Before 1832	Demolished before 1850.	
Sandfirden	Molen van Ente Schuurmans; 52°59′13″N 5°31′43″E		Before 1832	Demolished post-1850.	
Sandfirden	Polder 267; 52°58′51″N 5°32′23″E	Grondzeiler	Before 1832	Demolished before 1929.	
Sandfirden	Polder 268; 52°59′09″N 5°32′06″E	Spinnenkopmolen	Before 1832	Demolished between 1850 and 1930.	
Sandfirden	Polder 269; 52°59′05″N 5°31′41″E	Spinnenkopmolen	Before 1832	Demolished between 1922 and 1929.	
Sandfirden	Polder 270; 52°59′13″N 5°30′44″E	Grondzeiler	Before 1832	Demolished before 1928.	
Sandfirden	Polder De Bandster Poel; 52°59′10″N 5°32′20″E		Before 1832	Demolished before 1929.	
Sandfirden	Polder De Gouden Poel; 52°59′21″N 5°32′03″E	Spinnenkopmolen	Before 1873	Demolished before 1930.	
Sandfirden	Polder; 52°59′00″N 5°32′23″E	Grondzeiler	1850	Demolished post-1930.	
Sandfirden	52°59′09″N 5°35′26″E		1850	Demolished post-1930.	
Schalsum	De Schalsumermolen; Skalsumer Mole; 53°11′41″N 5°35′25″E	Grondzeiler	1801		
Schalsum	Wester- of Kleine Schalsumer Polder; 53°12′12″N 5°33′58″E	Grondzeiler	Before 1832	Demolished 1939.	
Schalsum		Spinnenkopmolen		Demolished post-1972.	
Scharl	Polder 22; 52°52′10″N 5°24′22″E	Tjasker	Before 1873	Demolished before 1930.	
Scharl	Polder 23; 53°51′47″N 5°24′30″E	Grondzeiler	Between 1718 and 1832	Between 1908 and 1919.	
Scharl	53°52′04″N 5°24′22″E		1850	Demolished post-1908.	
Scharneburen	Polder 18; 52°59′43″N 5°26′22″E		Before 1832	Demolished post-1930.	
Scharneburen	Polder 18a 52°59′59″N 5°26′25″E	Spinnenkopmolen	Before 1832	Demolished post-1850.	
Scharneburen	Polder 19; 52°59′36″N 5°26′41″E		Before 1832	Demolished post-1850.	
Scharneburen	Polder 20; Tweede Polder Bokma; Zeedijkmolen; 52.°N 5.°E	Grondzeiler	Between 1850 and 1870	Demolished 1932, base demolished between 1991 and 1994.	
Scharnegoutum	Greate Wierum	Iron windpump	1921	Molendatabase (in Dutch); De Hollandsche Molen (in Dutch)	
Scharnegoutum	Molen van de Pastory; 53°03′31″N 5°40′44″E		Before 1832	Demolished 1859.	
Scharnegoutum	Molen van Jacob de Vink; 53°04′21″N 5°40′46″E		Before 1832	Demolished before 1850.	
Scharnegoutum	Polder 200; 53°03′59″N 5°41′58″E		Before 1832	Demolished before 1929.	
Scharnegoutum	Polder 200a 53°03′58″N 5°42′06″E		Before 1832	Demolished post-1850.	
Scharnegoutum	Polder 201; 53°04′04″N 5°41′30″E		Before 1832	Demolished before 1929.	
Scharnegoutum	Polder 202; 53°04′08″N 5°41′17″E		Before 1832	Demolished before 1929.	
Scharnegoutum	Polder 203; 53°04′29″N 5°41′28″E		Before 1832	Demolished before 1929.	
Scharnegoutum	Polder 204; 53°04′30″N 5°41′46″E		Before 1832	Demolished before 1929.	
Scharnegoutum	Polder 259; 53°03′48″N 5°40′37″E	Spinnenkopmolen	Before 1832	Demolished 1922.	
Scharnegoutum	Polder 260; 53°03′59″N 5°40′47″E	Spinnenkopmolen	Before 1832	Demolished 1922.	
Scharnegoutum	Polder 261; 53°04′10″N 5°40′03″E	Spinnenkopmolen	Before 1832	Demolished 1922.	
Scharnegoutum	Polder 275a 53°04′02″N 5°39′45″E	Spinnenkopmolen	Before 1832	Demolished post-1850.	
Scharnegoutum	Polder 278; 53°04′05″N 5°39′52″E	Spinnenkopmolen	Before 1832	Demolished 1922.	
Scharnegoutum	Polder 279; 53°03′55″N 5°39′34″E	Spinnenkopmolen	Before 1832	Demolished 1922.	
Scharnegoutum	Polder 279a 53°03′48″N 5°39′14″E	Grondzeiler	Before 1832	Demolishedn1922.	
Scharnegoutum	Polder 280; 53°03′48″N 5°40′09″E	Spinnenkopmolen	Before 1832	Demolished 1922.	
Scharnegoutum	Polder 281; 53°03′24″N 5°40′34″E	Grondzeiler	Before 1832	Demolished 1922.	
Scharnegoutum	Polder 288; 53°03′25″N 5°39′44″E	Spinnenkopmolen	Between 1832 and 1850	Demolished 1922.	
Scharnegoutum	Polder 289; 53°03′31″N 5°39′35″E	Spinnenkopmolen	Before 1932	Demolished 1922.	
Scharsterbrug	De Skarrenmoune; 52°56′50″N 5°46′40″E	Grondzeiler	1881		
Scharsterbrug	Houtpolder; 52°57′07″N 5°45′19″E		Before 1932	Demolished post-1961.	
Scharsterbrug	Molen van Jan Grevelink; 52°56′57″N 5°46′40″E		Before 1832	Demolished post-1850.	
Scharsterbrug	Molen van Jenth Haagsma; 52°56′13″N 5°46′20″E		Before 1832		
Scharsterbrug	Molen van Jetsje de Jong; 52°56′41″N 5°46′22″E		Before 1832	Demolished before 1850.	
Scharsterbrug	Molen van Sijbren Asma; 52°56′54″N 5°46′21″E		Before 1832	Demolished post-1850.	
Scharsterbrug	Polder 48; 52°56′50″N 5°46′45″E		Before 1877	Demolished before 1909.	
Scharsterbrug	Polder 29; 52°56′54″N 5°46′47″E		Before 1877	Demolished post-1929.	
Scharsterbrug	Polder 187; 52°56′50″N 5°46′40″E		Before 1832	Demolished 1881.	
Scharsterbrug	Polder 189a 52°56′22″N 5°46′25″E		Before 1832	Demolished before 1930.	
Scharsterbrug	Polder Hoogland; 52°57′07″N 5°44′35″E	Weidemolen	Before 1932	Demolished post-1955.	
Scharsterbrug	52°56′16″N 5°46′26″E			Demolished post-1930.	
Scharsterbrug	52°56′26″N 5°46′29″E			Demolished post-1930.	
Scharsterbrug	Skarpolder; Scharsterpolder; 52°56′36″N 5°47′05″E	Spinnenkopmolen	Before 1832	Demolished 1929/30.	
Scherpenzeel	Grote Veenpolder part s 52°50′16″N 5°52′49″E	Weidemolen	Before 1877	Demolished post-1929.	
Scherpenzeel	Grote Veenpolder part t 52°50′09″N 5°52′34″E	Spinnenkopmolen	Before 1832	Demolished post-1850.	
Scherpenzeel	Molen van Gabe Gouma; 52°49′52″N 5°53′00″E	Spinnenkopmolen	Before 1832	Demolished post-1850.	
Scherpenzeel	Molen van Roelof Timmerman; 52°50′20″N 5°52′49″E		Before 1832	Demolished post-1850.	
Scherpenzeel	Polder 57a 52°50′13″N 5°52′01″E	Spinnenkopmolen	1877	Demolished before 1929.	
Scherpenzeel	Polder 58; 52°49′23″N 5°52′26″E		Before 1877	Demolished before 1929.	
Scherpenzeel	Polder 60; 52°49′47″N 5°53′01″E	Spinnenkopmolen	Before 1832	Demolished between 1850 and 1929.	
Scherpenzeel	52°49′31″N 5°51′05″E	Spinnenkopmolen	Before 1908	Demolished before 1934.	
Schettens	Molen van Baron van Pallandt tot den Kappel; 53°05′00″N 5°29′17″E	Spinnenkopmolen	Before 1832	Demolished before 1850.	
Schettens	Molen van Petrus de Kok; 53°04′31″N 5°29′55″E	Spinnenkopmolen	1817	Demolished before 1850.	
Schettens	Polder 423; 53°05′23″N 5°29′00″E	Grondzeiler	Before 1832	Demolished post-1931.	
Schettens	Polder Bittens; 53°05′21″N 5°29′03″E	Spinnenkopmolen	Before 1832	Demolished post-1929.	
Schiermonnikoog	Molen van Schiermonnikoog; 53°29′21″N 6°09′36″E	Standerdmolen	Before 1579	Demolished 1762.	
Schiermonnikoog	Molen van Schiermonnikoog; 53°28′36″N 6°09′20″E	Achtkantemolen	1762	Burnt down 1858.	
Schiermonnikoog	Molen van Schiermonnikoog		1858	Burnt down 1863, remains demolished 1872.	
Schraard	Polder 13; 53°04′59″N 5°26′52″E	Spinnenkopmolen	Before 1832	Demolished before 1929.	
Schraard	Polder 14; 53°04′47″N 5°26′46″E	Spinnenkopmolen	1742	Demolished before 1929.	
Schraard	Polder 24; 53°04′37″N 5°26′52″E	Spinnenkopmolen	Before 1832	Demolished before 1929.	
Schraard	Polder 25; 53°04′41″N 5°27′08″E	Spinnenkopmolen	before 1832	Demolished c.1950.	
Schraard	Polder 25a 53°04′39″N 5°27′18″E		Before 1832	Demolished post-1850.	
Schraard	Polder Doniawier; 53°04′13″N 5°26′04″E	Grondzeiler	1850	Demolished before 1928.	
Schraard	Schraarderpolder; De Grote Molen; 53°05′00″N 5°27′16″E	Spinnenkopmolen	Before 1832	Blown down 1904.	
Schraard	Schraarderpolder; De Grote Molen; 53°05′00″N 5°27′16″E	Spinnenkopmolen	1904	Demolished c.1946.	
Schraard	Waterschap De Weeren; De Wolkenkrabber; Greate Pier; 53°04′18″N 5°26′59″E	Grondzeiler	1921	Demolished 1951.	
Seerijp	Het Nieuwland; De Zurijpolder; 53°22′36″N 5°17′39″E	Weidemolen	1858	Demolished 1880.	
Sexbierum	De Korenaar; 53°13′20″N 5°29′21″E	Stellingmolen	1727	Burnt down 1874.	
Sexbierum	De Korenaar; 53°13′20″N 5°29′21″E	Stellingmolen	1868		
Sexbierum	Liauckema-molen; 53°13′05″N 5°28′42″E	Standerdmolen	Before 1479	Blown down 1526.	
Sexbierum	Liauckema-molen; 53°13′05″N 5°28′42″E	Standerdmolen	1526	Burnt down 1726.	
Sexbierum	Molen van Adriaan de Roock; 53°12′08″N 5°29′18″E		Before 1625	Demolished between 1852 and 1873.	
Sexbierum	Molen van B. J. G. van Asbeck; 53°12′07″N 5°28′49″E	Spinnenkopmolen	Before 1625	Demolished between 1852 and 1873.	
Sexbierum	Molen van C. E. E. Baron Collot d'Escury; 53°12′33″N 5°28′53″E	Spinnenkopmolen	Before 1832	Demolished post-1850.	
Sexbierum	Molen van Sijbrand Spannenburg; 53°13′53″N 5°28′58″E		Before 1832	Demolished before 1850.	
Sexbierum	Polder 1; 53°12′08″N 5°28′18″E	Spinnenkopmolen	Before 1625	Demolished post-1887.	
Sexbierum	Polder 2; 53°12′05″N 5°28′35″E	Spinnenkopmolen	Before 1625	Demolished c.1902.	
Sexbierum	Sexbierumer Noorderpolder; 53°13′59″N 5°28′40″E	Grondzeiler	1849	Demolished before 1928.	
Sexbierum	Sexbierumer Zuiderpolder; 53°12′10″N 5°30′15″E	Spinnenkopmolen	Before 1625	Demolished before 1832.	
Sexbierum	Sexbierumer Zuiderpolder; 53°12′10″N 5°30′15″E	Grondzeiler	Before 1832	Demolished c.1925.	
Sibrandabuorren	Molen van Jacob Wijtsma; 53°03′49″N 5°42′59″E		Before 1832	Demolished before 1850.	
Sibrandabuorren	Polder 164; 53°04′19″N 5°43′18″E	Spinnenkopmolen	Before 1832	Demolished post-1850.	
Sibrandabuorren	Polder 166; 53°03′47″N 5°43′45″E	Spinnenkopmolen	Before 1832	Demolished before 1929.	
Sibrandabuorren	Polder 176; 53°03′49″N 5°43′25″E		Before 1832	Demolished before 1929.	
Sibrandabuorren	Polder 177; 53°03′46″N 5°43′26″E		Before 1832	Demolished before 1929.	
Sibrandabuorren	Polder 178; 53°03′36″N 5°43′32″E		Before 1832	Demolished before 1929.	
Sibrandabuorren	Polder 179; 53°04′12″N 5°43′09″E	Spinnenkopmolen	Before 1832	Demolished post-1850.	
Sibrandabuorren	Polder 180; 53°03′34″N 5°44′26″E		1850	Demolished between 1930 and 1932.	
Sibrandabuorren	Polder 180a 53°04′02″N 5°42′50″E		1873	Demolished before 1928.	
Sibrandabuorren	Polder 205; 53°04′13″N 5°42′26″E		Before 1832	Demolished before 1929.	
Sibrandabuorren	Polder 206; 53°04′09″N 5°42′45″E		Before 1832	Demolished before 1929.	
Sibrandabuorren	Polder 206a 53°03′59″N 5°42′36″E	Spinnenkopmolen	Before 1832	Demolished post-1850.	
Sibrandabuorren	Polder 206b 53°03′58″N 5°42′52″E		Before 1832	Demolished post-1850.	
Sibrandabuorren	Polder 207; 53°04′28″N 5°42′53″E		Before 1832	Demolished post-1850.	
Sibrandabuorren	53°03′46″N 5°42′58″E		Between 1832 and 1850	Demolished before 1909.	
Sibrandahûs	Polder 46; 53°18′38″N 5°57′27″E		Before 1832	Demolished 1926.	
Sibrandahûs	53°18′52″N 5°58′18″E		1874	Demolished post-1930.	
Sibrandahûs	53°18′26″N 5°57′41″E	Grondzeiler	1874	Demolished post 1928.	
Siegerswoude	Mieuwmeer; 53°05′39″N 6°15′22″E		1832	Demolished before 1887.	
Siegerswoude	Polder 10; 53°06′20″N 6°13′38″E	Weidemolen	Before 1875	Demolished before 1925.	
Siegerswoude	Polder 11; 53°06′23″N 6°14′24″E		Before 1877	Demolished before 1925.	
Siegerswoude	Polder 12; 53°06′10″N 6°14′17″E		Before 1877	Demolished post-1925.	
Sint Annaparochie	De Welkomst; 53°16′28″N 5°38′06″E	Stellingmolen	1844	Burnt down 1880.	
Sint Annaparochie	De Welkomst; 53°16′28″N 5°38′06″E	Stellingmolen	1881	Burnt down 1975.	
Sint Annaparochie	53°16′41″N 5°41′09″E				
Sint Annaparochie	Mosterdmolen; 53°17′04″N 5°39′12″E	Wipmolen	1850	Demolished before 1864.	
Sint Annaparochie	Noord-Westerpolder; 53°16′59″N 5°38′00″E	Grondzeiler	Before 1850.	Demolished post-1928.	
Sint Annaparochie	Pelmolen; 53°17′08″N 5°39′18″E		1697	Demolished 1860.	
Sint Annaparochie	Polder 6; 53°16′12″N 5°38′09″E	Grondzeiler	1815	Demolished c.1930.	
Sint Annaparochie	Polder 7; 53°15′35″N 5°40′40″E		Before 1832	Demolished post-1850.	
Sint Annaparochie	Polder 7a 53°16′38″N 5°41′13″E				
Sint Annaparochie	Polder Het Nieuwe Bildt; Waterschap De Noordster; De Noordster; 53°18′24″N 5°40′04″E	Grondzeiler	1816	Demolished 1983.	
Sint Annaparochie	Rogmolen; 53°17′04″N 5°39′18″E	Standerdmolen	1528	Demolished 1907.	
Sint Annaparochie	Watermolenpolder; Zuidhoek; 53.°N 5.°E	Grondzeiler	1876	Burnt down 1973.	
Sint Jacobiparochie	Zwarte Haan	Grondzeiler	c. 1877	Cap and sails removed 1925, smock used in 1997 to rebuild De Mars in De Blesse. Database van Verdwenen Molens in Nederland (in Dutch)	
Sint Jacobiparochie	De Hoop; 53°16′19″N 5°35′47″E	Grondzeiler	Before 1714	Burnt down 1875.	
Sint Jacobiparochie	Korenmolen van Sint Jacobieparochie; 53°16′19″N 5°35′47″E	Standerdmolen	1556	Blown down 1603.	
Sint Jacobiparochie	Korenmolen van Sint Jacobieparochie; 53°16′19″N 5°35′47″E	Standerdmolen	1603	Blown down 1714.	
Sint Jacobiparochie	De Hoop; 53°16′19″N 5°35′47″E	Stellingmolen	1875	Demolished 1930.	
Sint Jacobiparochie	Hovensterpolder; Oog in 't Zeil; 53°16′02″N 5°34′19″E	Grondzeiler	1832	Demolished c.1934.	
Sint Jacobiparochie	Molentje van J. G. de Beer; 53°16′28″N 5°33′59″E	Stellingmolen			
Sint Jacobiparochie	Molen van Cornelis Posthumus; 53°16′42″N 5°33′38″E		Before 1832	Demolished before 1850.	
Sint Jacobiparochie	Polder 1 Bouwlustpolder; Veel Moeite; 53°17′50″N 5°35′07″E	Grondzeiler	Before 1832	Demolished post-1832.	
Sint Jacobiparochie	Polder 2 Oostelijke Polder; 53°18′03″N 5°35′40″E	Grondzeiler	1850	Demolished c.1931.	
Sint Jacobiparochie	Polder 3; 53°18′12″N 5°36′07″E	Grondzeiler	1850	Demolished before 1928.	
Sint Jacobiparochie	Polder 3; 53°15′54″N 5°33′16″E	Grondzeiler	Before 1873	Demolished post-1928.	
Sint Jacobiparochie	Polder 4 Polder Het Noorden; De Zwaarte Haan; 53°18′18″N 5°36′28″E	Grondzeiler	1877	Demolished 1997.	
Sint Jacobiparochie	Polder 5; 53°18′09″N 5°37′13″E	Grondzeiler	Before 1850	Demolished before 1928.	
Sint Jacobiparochie	Polder 5; 53°15′37″N 5°36′47″E		Before 1832	Demolished post-1930.	
Sint Jacobiparochie	Westersche Polder; Waterschap De Koning; De Koning; 53°17′13″N 5°34′11″E	Grondzeiler	1854	Demolished 1934.	
Sint Jacobiparochie	Zuid-Oosterpolder; Kleine Molen; 53°16′16″N 5°37′59″E	Grondzeiler	Before 1832	Demolished post-1897.	
Sint Jacobiparochie	Zuid-Oosterpolder; Zwarte Molen; 53°15′49″N 5°36′56″E		Before 1832	Demolished 1924.	
Sint Jacobiparochie	Zuid-Westerpolder; 53°16′08″N 5°35′40″E	Grondzeiler	Before 1832	Demolished post-1930.	
Sintjohannesga	De Hersteller; 52°55′28″N 5°51′51″E	Grondzeiler	1857	Molendatabase (in Dutch)	
Sintjohannesga	Griën; 52.°N 5.°E	Tjasker	1877	Demolished c.1934.	
Sintjohannesga	Griën; 52°55′32″N 5°51′16″E	Tjasker	1877	Demolished c.1934.	
Sintjohannesga	Griën; 52°55′35″N 5°51′25″E	Tjasker	1877	Demolished c.1934.	
Sintjohannesga	Griën; 52°55′37″N 5°51′23″E	Tjasker	1877	Demolished c.1934.	
Sintjohannesga	Griën; 52°55′43″N 5°51′39″E	Tjasker	1877	Demolished c.1934.	
Sintjohannesga	Griën; 52°55′44″N 5°51′44″E	Tjasker	1877	Demolished before 1934.	
Sintjohannesga	52°55′45″N 5°50′38″E	Weidemolen	Before 1926	Demolished post-1934.	
Sintjohannesga	Molen van Johannes Greveling; 52°56′14″N 5°52′43″E		Before 1832	Demolished before 1850.	
Sintjohannesga	Molen van Willem Postma; 52°56′10″N 5°52′32″E		Before 1832	Demolished before 1850.	
Sintjohannesga	Molen van Wolter Bos; 52°56′10″N 5°52′32″E		Before 1832	Demolished before 1850.	
Sintjohannesga	Polder 1a 52°55′47″N 5°50′05″E		1877	Demolished before 1932.	
Sintjohannesga	Polder 1b 52°55′36″N 5°50′25″E		1877	Demolished before 1932.	
Sintjohannesga	Polder 3b 52°55′53″N 5°51′14″E	Tjasker	Before 1877	Demolished before 1932.	
Sintjohannesga	Polder 4; 52°55′41″N 5°51′34″E		Before 1877	Demolished before 1909.	
Sintjohannesga	Polder 38; 52°56′23″N 5°52′21″E	Tjasker	Before 1832	Demolished before 1932.	
Sintjohannesga	Polder 39; 52°56′15″N 5°51′18″E	Tjasker	1877	Demolished before 1932.	
Sintjohannesga	Polder 40; 52°56′07″N 5°50′45″E		1877	Demolished before 1932.	
Sintjohannesga	Polder 41; 52°56′20″N 5°50′53″E		1877	Demolished before 1932.	
Sint Nicolaasga	Beijmapolder; 52°55′13″N 5°46′00″E		Before 1873	Demolished before 1930.	
Sint Nicolaasga	Korenmolen van Sint Nicolaasga; 52°55′19″N 5°44′26″E	Standerdmolen	Before 1664	Demolished 1757.	
Sint Nicolaasga	Molen van Jan Windt; 52°54′56″N 5°46′56″E		Before 1832	Demolished post-1850.	
Sint Nicolaasga	Polder 22; 52°55′36″N 5°46′37″E		Before 1873	Demolished before 1930.	
Sint Nicolaasga	Polder 22a Polpolder; Potpolder; 52°55′20″N 5°46′22″E		Before 1873	Demolished before 1930.	
Sint Nicolaasga	Polder A 52°55′13″N 5°45′44″E		Before 1873	Demolished before 1930.	
Sint Nicolaasga	Polder B 52°55′09″N 5°45′19″E	Spinnenkopmolen	Before 1873	Demolished before 1930.	
Sint Nicolaasga	Slotpolder; 52°55′10″N 5°45′01″E	Grondzeiler	1778	Demolished 1926.	
Sint Nicolaasga	Rijsterpolder; 52°55′20″N 5°46′22″E	Iron windpump	1930		
Skingen	Molen van Eelke Poelstra; 53°11′49″N 5°36′42″E	Spinnenkopmolen	Before 1832	Demolished before 1850.	
Skûlenboarch	Schuilenberger Molen	Grondzeiler		Dismantled 1994, smock moved to Meppel, Drenthe; Molendatabase	
Slijkenburg	Grote Veenpolder part c 52°49′03″N 5°50′09″E	Weidemolen		Demolished before 1929.	
Slijkenburg	Grote Veenpolder part e 52°48′48″N 5°50′10″E		Before 1832	Demolished 1929.	
Slijkenburg	Grote Veenpolder part f 52°48′37″N 5°51′33″E	Spinnenkopmolen	Before 1832	Demolished 1929.	
Slijkenburg	Grote Veenpolder part i 52°48′27″N 5°51′37″E	Spinnenkopmolen	Before 1832	Demolished 1929.	
Slijkenburg	Grote Veenpolder part z 52°49′08″N 5°50′54″E	Weidemolen	Before 1877	Demolished post 1929.	
Slijkenburg	Korenmolen van Slijkenburg; 52°48′24″N 5°50′38″E	Standerdmolen	Before 1664	Demolished post-1718.	
Slijkenburg	Polder 2; 52°48′51″N 5°50′42″E		Before 1832	Demolished between 1850 and 1929.	
Slijkenburg	Polder 3; 52°48′37″N 5°51′40″E	Spinnenkopmolen	Before 1832	Demolished between 1850 and 1929.	
Slijkenburg	52°48′27″N 5°50′15″E	Grondzeiler	Before 1883	Demolished before 1929.	
Sloten	Korenmolen van Sloten; 52°53′37″N 5°38′48″E	Standerdmolen	Between 1560 and 1616	Demolished c.1755.	
Sloten	De Korenmolen; De Kaai; 52°53′37″N 5°38′48″E	Stellingmolen	1755		
Sloten	Jetze Tjeerds Nijenhuispolder; 52°53′25″N 5°39′00″E	Spinnenkopmolen	Before 1832	Demolished before 1929.	
Sloten	Kaaienpolder; 52°53′42″N 5°39′08″E	Spinnenkopmolen	Before 1832	Demolished before 1929.	
Sloten	Korenmolen van Sloten; 52°53′38″N 5°38′41″E	Standerdmolen	Before 1523	Demolished post-1616.	
Sloten	Polder 32; 52°53′47″N 5°38′24″E	Spinnenkopmolen	Before 1832	Demolished before 1929.	
Smallebrugge	Polder 209; 52°57′45″N 5°37′57″E	Spinnenkopmolen	Before 1832	Demolished post-1930.	
Smallebrugge	Polder 210; 52°57′36″N 5°38′07″E	Spinnenkopmolen	Before 1832	Demolished post-1930.	
Smallebrugge	Polder 211; 52°57′25″N 5°38′28″E	Spinnenkopmolen	Before 1832	Demolished before 1930.	
Smallebrugge	Polder 214; 52°57′21″N 5°38′12″E	Spinnenkopmolen	Before 1832	Demolished post-1930.	
Smalle Ee	De Hoop; 53°06′19″N 6°01′05″E	Grondzeiler	1800	Moved to De Veenhoop 1837.	
Smalle Ee	Hermannes Turfgravery; 53°06′05″N 5°59′30″E		Before 1718	Demolished before 1832.l	
Smalle Ee	Molen van Binnert van Eijsinga; 53°06′06″N 6°00′54″E		Before 1832	Demolished before 1850.	
Smalle Ee	Molen van Smalle Ee; 53°06′19″N 6°01′05″E	Standerdmolen	Before 1645	Demolished c.1800.	
Sneek	Himmole; 53°01′42″N 5°38′11″E	Spinnenkop	1982	Moved to IJlst 2011.	
Sneek	Paaltjasker	Tjasker	1975	Dismantled 1980, re-erected at De Hoeve in 2000. Molendatabase (in Dutch); De Hollandsche Molen (in Dutch)	
Sneek	Molen 't Op	Spinnenkop stellingmolen	18th century	Moved to Koudum 1986. Molendatabase; De Hollandsche Molen	
Sneek	Windmotor Ysbrechtum; 53°02′31″N 5°38′26″E	Iron windpump	1930		
Sneek	Cementmolen; 53°01′37″N 5°39′56″E		Before 1792	Demolished post-1823.	
Sneek	53°01′41″N 5°39′15″E	Stellingmolen	1707	Demolished before 1859.	
Sneek	De Fontein; Stroopmolen van Verwer; 53°01′41″N 5°39′15″E	Stellingmolen	1859	Demolished c.1910.	
Sneek	De Haan; 53°01′41″N 5°39′09″E	Stellingmolen	Between 1750 and 1792	Moved to Franeker 1892.	
Sneek	De Hen; 53°02′18″N 5°40′04″E	Stellingmolen	Between 1850 and 1860	Demolished c.1850.	
Sneek	De Hoop; Molen van Beekhuis; 53°01′26″N 5°39′49″E	Stellingmolen	Before 1774	Demolished 1910.	
Sneek	De Hoop; Molen van Zwart; 53°01′59″N 5°40′01″E	Stellingmolen	1868	Demolished c.1912.	
Sneek	De Monnik; De Munnik; 53°02′13″N 5°39′09″E	Stellingmolen	Before 1700	Demolished c.1941.	
Sneek	De Onderneming; 53°01′44″N 5°40′18″E	Stellingmolen	1871	Demolished c.1906.	
Sneek	Oostermolen; 53°01′58″N 5°40′06″E	Standerdmolen	Before 1560	Demolished post-1664.	
Sneek	De Ooster; Oostermolen; 53°01′58″N 5°40′06″E	Stellingmolen	1700	Rebuilt 1851.	
Sneek	De Ooster; Molen van Gebroeders Kok; 53°01′58″N 5°40′06″E	Stellingmolen	1851	Demolished 1917, base demolished post-1930.	
Sneek	Zaagmolen van Atze Buwalda; 53°01′43″N 5°39′05″E	Stellingmolen	1718	Burnt down 1804.	
Sneek	De Zwarte Hengst; De Swarte Hengst; 53°01′43″N 5°39′05″E	Stellingmolen	1806	Demolished c.1890.	
Sneek	53°01′36″N 5°40′01″E	Stellingmolen	Before 1756	Demolished between 1830 and 1832.	
Sneek	Eekmolen aan de Gaauw; 53°01′41″N 5°39′15″E	Standerdmolen	1618	Demolished post 1664.	
Sneek	Goezekoester Polder; De Goezekoester; 53°01′45″N 5°38′50″E	Spinnenkopmolen	Before 1832	Burnt down 1923.	
Sneek	Het Zwarte Paard; 53°02′03″N 5°40′16″E	Stellingmolen	1720	Demolished 1921, base demolished post-1984.	
Sneek	Leermolen van Cornelis van der Feer; 53°02′07″N 5°39′52″E		1823	Demolished 1845.	
Sneek	Molen van Epke de Roos van Bienema; 53°01′36″N 5°39′36″E		Before 1832	Demolished before 1850.	
Sneek	Molen van Koopmans; 53°00′40″N 5°40′04″E	Tjasker	Before 1887	Demolished before 1949.	
Sneek	Molen van Sijbe Bloksma; 53°01′39″N 5°39′29″E		Before 1832	Demolished before 1850.	
Sneek	Molen van Stam; 53°01′46″N 5°40′29″E	Grondzeiler	Before 1717	Demolished post-1851.	
Sneek	Molen van Stam; 53°01′46″N 5°40′29″E	Stellingmolen	Before 1852	Demolished 1894.	
Sneek	Molen van Tjepke van der Molen; 53°01′42″N 5°38′11″E		Before 1832	Demolished post-1850.	
Sneek	Molen van Wilhelmina Bienema; 53°01′39″N 5°37′29″E	Spinnenkopmolen	Before 1832	Demolished before 1850.	
Sneek	Molen van Willem Nijdam; 53°01′50″N 5°40′15″E		Before 1832	Demolished before 1850.	
Sneek	Mosterdmolen; 53°02′06″N 5°40′22″E		1845	Demolished post-1865.	
Sneek	Mosterdmolen; 53°02′10″N 5°39′18″E		Before 1718	Demolished before 1792.	
Sneek	Noordermolen; 53°02′05″N 5°39′20″E	Standerdmolen	Before 1498	Destroyed in an attack on Sneek 1517.	
Sneek	Noordermolen; 53°02′05″N 5°39′20″E	Standerdmolen	1815	Demolished c.1752.	
Sneek	53°02′11″N 5°39′16″E	Spinnenkop stellingmolen	Before 1700	Demolished between 1801 and 1832.	
Sneek	Oliemolen van Ale Steenstra; 53°02′01″N 5°40′08″E	Spinnenkopmolen	1850	Demolished post-1852.	
Sneek	Peldegastmolen; 53°01′44″N 5°38′55″E		1718	Demolished before 1832.	
Sneek	53°01′42″N 5°39′36″E	Standerdmolen	1591	Demolished post-1718.	
Sneek	Polder 82; Kleine Groene Molen; 53°02′14″N 5°36′58″E	Spinnenkopmolen	Before 1832	Demolished post-1930.	
Sneek	Polder 89; 53°01′28″N 5°38′16″E	Grondzeiler	Between 1832 and 1850	Demolished post-1909.	
Sneek	Polder 90; 53°02′07″N 5°37′16″E	Spinnenkopmolen	Before 1832	Demolished post-1930.	
Sneek	Polder 91; 53°02′14″N 5°37′24″E	Spinnenkopmolen	Before 1832	Demolished post-1930.	
Sneek	Polder 92; 53°02′23″N 5°37′05″E	Spinnenkopmolen	Before 1832	Demolished post-1850.	
Sneek	Polder 96; 53°02′01″N 5°38′29″E	Spinnenkopmolen	Before 1832	Demolished before 1929.	
Sneek	Polder 99; De Stadmolen; 53°02′26″N 5°39′32″E	Spinnenkopmolen	Before 1826	Demolished 1922.	
Sneek	Polder 101; 53°02′37″N 5°40′03″E	Spinnenkopmolen	Before 1832	Demolished 1922.	
Sneek	Polder 102; 53°02′33″N 5°40′17″E		Before 1832	Demolished before 1929.	
Sneek	Polder 104; Groenedijkstermolen; Sijtingawierstermolen; 53°02′15″N 5°40′43″E	Spinnenkopmolen	Before 1832	Demolished post-1919.	
Sneek	Polder 105; Sytsingawier; Barrewierstermolen; 53°02′07″N 5°40′24″E	Spinnenkopmolen	Before 1832	Demolished post-1855.	
Sneek	Polder 106; Molen van Kuiper; De Domp; 53°02′02″N 5°40′55″E	Grondzeiler	Before 1832	Demolished post-1932.	
Sneek	Polder 111; Haubois; 53°02′32″N 5°41′18″E	Spinnenkopmolen	Before 1832	Demolished before 1929.	
Sneek	Polder 112; 53°02′49″N 5°41′23″E		Before 1832	Demolished before 1929.	
Sneek	Polder 130; 53°01′23″N 5°41′41″E	Grondzeiler	Before 1832	Demolished post-1930.	
Sneek	Polder 131; 53°01′11″N 5°41′55″E	Spinnenkopmolen	Before 1832	Demolished post-1850.	
Sneek	Polder 140; Oppenhuisterpolder; Molen 't Op; 53°01′16″N 5°41′30″E	Spinnenkopmolen	Before 1832	Moved to Tjerkwerd c.1980.	
Sneek	Polder 141; 53°01′38″N 5°40′43″E	Spinnenkopmolen	Before 1832	Demolished post-1930.	
Sneek	Polder 142; Polder Sperkhem; 53°01′30″N 5°40′23″E	Grondzeiler	Before 1832	Demolished post-1930.	
Sneek	Polder 143; 53°01′15″N 5°39′58″E	Spinnenkopmolen	Before 1832	Demolished 1916.	
Sneek	Polder 144; Molen bij Klein Tinga; 53°01′19″N 5°39′47″E	Spinnenkopmolen	Before 1832	Demolished 1916.	
Sneek	Polder 145; 53°01′29″N 5°38′58″E	Grondzeiler	1808	Demolished 1916.	
Sneek	Polder 146; Tinnegapolder; 53°01′23″N 5°38′44″E		Before 1832	Burnt down 1914.	
Sneek	Polder 148; 53°00′40″N 5°39′50″E	Spinnenkopmolen	Before 1832	Demolished 1916.	
Sneek	Polder 148a Molen van Dijkstra; 53°00′37″N 5°40′00″E	Tjasker	Before 1873	Demolished post-1932.	
Sneek	Polder 148b Molen van Boersma; 53°00′42″N 5°40′30″E	Tjasker	Before 1873	Demolished post-1932.	
Sneek	Polder 193; 53°02′51″N 5°41′16″E		Before 1832	Demolished before 1929.	
Sneek	Polder 194; 53°02′54″N 5°40′41″E		Before 1832	Demolished before 1929.	
Sneek	Polder 282; 53°03′04″N 5°40′21″E	Spinnenkopmolen	Before 1832	Demolished 1922.	
Sneek	Polder 284; 53°02′54″N 5°39′43″E	Grondzeiler	Before 1832	Demolished 1922.	
Sneek	Polder 285; 53°02′52″N 5°39′39″E	Spinnenkopmolen	Before 1832	Demolished 1922.	
Sneek	Polder 286; 53°03′00″N 5°39′31″E	Spinnenkopmolen	Before 1832	Demolished 1922.	
Sneek	Polder De Jager; 53°00′35″N 5°40′03″E	Tjasker	Before 1908	Demolished before 1932.	
Sneek	53°00′32″N 5°39′28″E	Grondzeiler	Before 1908	Demolished 1916.	
Sneek	53°01′37″N 5°38′31″E		Between 1832 and 1850	Demolished before 1909.	
Sneek	Roode Molen; 53°01′59″N 5°40′01″E	Standerdmolen	Before 1543	Demolished post-1752.	
Sneek	Skemherstermolen; 53°01′49″N 5°40′12″E		Before 1832	Demolished before 1850.	
Sneek	Suidmollen; Zuidermolen; 53°01′44″N 5°39′42″E	Standerdmolen	Before 1560	Demolished 1760.	
Sneek	Volmolen van Joseph Noijon; 53°01′50″N 5°39′29″E	Stellingmolen	1826	Moved outside Friesland 1852.	
Sneek	Windlust; 53°01′42″N 5°39′36″E	Stellingmolen	Before 1751	Demolished 1869.	
Sneek	Windlust; 53°01′49″N 5°40′12″E	Spinnenkopmolen	1882	Burnt down 1914.	
Snikzwaag	Tjasker	Tjasker		Demolished 1921; De Hollandsche Molen (in Dutch)	
Snikzwaag	Molen van Arjen Brouwer; 52°58′37″N 5°47′17″E		Before 1832	Demolished before 1850.	
Snikzwaag	Molen van Johannes Schaap; 52°58′54″N 5°48′10″E		Before 1832	Demolished between 1850 and 1877.	
Snikzwaag	Molen van Sijbren de Vries; 52°59′47″N 5°48′37″E		Before 1832	Demolished before 1850.	
Snikzwaag	Polder 67; 52°58′43″N 5°47′27″E		Before 1832	Demolished before 1877.	
Snikzwaag	Polder 68; 52°58′43″N 5°47′25″E	Tjasker	Before 1877	Demolished post-1929.	
Snikzwaag	Polder 69; 52°58′54″N 5°47′22″E		Before 1877	Demolished before 1929.	
Snikzwaag	Polder 70; 52°58′54″N 5°47′26″E		Before 1832	Demolished before 1929.	
Snikzwaag	Polder 71; 52°59′07″N 5°47′19″E	Spinnenkopmolen	Before 1832	Demolished before 1929.	
Snikzwaag	Polder 72; Tjasker van Romkema; 52°59′02″N 5°47′13″E	Tjasker	1850	Demolished 1921.	
Snikzwaag	Polder 73; 52°59′12″N 5°47′03″E		Before 1832	Demolished before 1929.	
Snikzwaag	Polder 74; 52°59′38″N 5°47′45″E		Before 1832	Demolished before 1929.	
Snikzwaag	Zwarte Polder; 52°58′56″N 5°48′01″E	Grondzeiler	Before 1908	Demolished before 1930.	
Snikzwaag	Polder Romkema; Spinnekop van Romkema; De Ikkers; 52°59′00″N 5°47′16″E	Spinnenkopmolen	1921	Moved to Warten 1970.	
Snikzwaag	Zwarte Polder; 52°58′39″N 5°47′33″E		Before 1832	Demolished before 1850.	
Snikzwaag	Zwarte Polder; 52°58′46″N 5°47′54″E		Before 1877	Demolished post-1929.	
Sondel	Korenmolen van Sondel; 52°52′23″N 5°35′54″E	Standerdmolen	Before 1622	Demolished post-1718.	
Sondel	Molen van Onkel van Swinderen; 52°51′27″N 5°36′17″E		Before 1832	Demolished before 1850.	
Sondel	Oude Sondeler Polder; 52°52′10″N 5°36′36″E	Spinnenkopmolen	Before 1832	Demolished before 1873.	
Sondel	Oude Sondeler Polder; 52°52′10″N 5°36′36″E	Grondzeiler	Before 1873	Burnt down 1968.	
Sondel	Nieuwe Sondeler Polder; 52°52′10″N 5°36′55″E	Grondzeiler	Before 1832	Demolished between 1926 and 1939.	
Sonnega	Polder 120; 52°51′34″N 5°58′54″E	Spinnenkopmolen	Before 1832	Demolished before 1924.	
Sonnega	52°51′42″N 5°59′14″E		Before 1926		
Sonnega	52°51′03″N 5°59′11″E		Before 1921	Demolished post-1926.	
Sonnega	52°51′14″N 5°58′44″E		Before 1921	Demolished post-1926.	
Sonnega	52°51′07″N 5°59′41″E		Before 1926		
Spanga	Grote Veenpolder part a 52°49′06″N 5°53′23″E	Weidemolen	Before 1877	Demolished before 1929.	
Spanga	Grote Veenpolder part d 52°48′58″N 5°52′02″E	Weidemolen		Demolished before 1929.	
Spanga	Grote Veenpolder part g 52°48′30″N 5°52′25″E	Weidemolen	Before 1877	Demolished before 1929.	
Spanga	Grote Veenpolder part h 52°48′30″N 5°53′31″E	Weidemolen	Before 1877	Demolished post-1929.	
Spanga	Grote Veenpolder part j 52°48′27″N 5°52′49″E	Weidemolen	Before 1877	Demolished post-1929.	
Spanga	Grote Veenpolder part k 52°48′24″N 5°53′08″E	Weidemolen	Before 1877	Demolished post-1929.	
Spanga	Grote Veenpolder part l 52°48′13″N 5°52′10″E	Weidemolen	Before 1877	Demolished post-1929.	
Spanga	Grote Veenpolder part m 52°48′10″N 5°52′26″E	Weidemolen	Before 1877	Demolished before 1929.	
Spanga	Grote Veenpolder part p 52°49′01″N 5°54′37″E		Before 1832	Demolished between 1850 and 1929.	
Spanga	Grote Veenpolder part q 52°49′01″N 5°54′20″E	Weidemolen	Before 1832	Demolished post-1932.	
Spanga	Grote Veenpolder part r 52°49′00″N 5°54′37″E		Before 1832	Demolished post-1932.	
Spanga	Grote Veenpolder part u 52°49′25″N 5°52′32″E		Before 1832	Demolished post-1850.	
Spanga	Grote Veenpolder part v 52°49′24″N 5°52′36″E	Paltrokmolen	Before 1832	Demolished post-1850.	
Spanga	Grote Veenpolder part w 52°49′16″N 5°53′05″E	Spinnenkopmolen	Before 1832	Demolished before 1850.	
Spanga	Grote Veenpolder part x 52°49′09″N 5°52′00″E	Weidemolen		Demolished before 1929.	
Spanga	Molen van Klaas Oosten; 52°49′09″N 5°53′28″E	Spinnenkopmolen	Before 1832	Demolished before 1850.	
Spanga	Polder 4; 52°48′58″N 5°51′55″E		Before 1883	Demolished before 1929.	
Spanga	Polder 5; 52°49′01″N 5°52′18″E		Before 1883	Demolished before 1929.	
Spanga	Polder 6; 52°49′12″N 5°54′19″E		Before 1883	Demolished before 1929.	
Spanga	Polder 6a 52°49′12″N 5°53′43″E	Weidemolen	Before 1877	Demolished before 1929.	
Spanga	Polder 7; 52°49′15″N 5°54′33″E		Before 1883	Demolished before 1929.	
Spanga	Polder 8; 52°48′53″N 5°53′30″E	Spinnenkopmolen	Before 1883	Demolished before 1929.	
Spanga	Polder 59; 52°49′40″N 5°53′48″E	Spinnenkopmolen	Before 1832	Demolished between 1850 and 1929.	
Spanga	52°49′01″N 5°53′24″E	Tjasker		Demolished before 1929.	
Spannum	Molen van de Boer; 53°07′51″N 5°36′19″E	Grondzeiler	1886	Demolished post-1957.	
Spannum	Molen van de Kerk van Spannum; 53°08′24″N 5°37′25″E		Before 1832	Demolished before 1850.	
Spannum	Molen van het Burgerweeshuis; 53°08′08″N 5°35′29″E	Spinnenkopmolen	Before 1850.		
Spannum	Molen van het St. Anthonij Gasthuis; 53°08′21″N 5°37′48″E		Before 1832	Demolished before 1850.	
Spannum	Polder 39; 53°09′17″N 5°35′32″E		Before 1850	Demolished before 1928.	
Spannum	Polder 42; 53°08′08″N 5°35′29″E	Grondzeiler		Blown down 1949.	
Spannum	Polder 52; 53°08′07″N 5°36′11″E	Spinnenkopmolen	Befofre 1855	Demolished between 1951 and 1957.	
Spannum	Polder 53; 53°08′02″N 5°36′35″E		Between 1832 and 1850	Demolished before 1929.	
Spannum	Polder 54; 53°08′48″N 5°36′13″E	Grondzeiler	Before 1832	Demolished post-1929.	
Spannum	Polder 55; 53°09′24″N 5°36′11″E	Grondzeiler	Before 1832	Demolished 1952.	
Spannum	Polder 56; 53°08′53″N 5°36′43″E	Grondzeiler	Before 1832	Demolished 1949.	
Spannum	Polder 59; 53°08′06″N 5°36′59″E	Spinnenkopmolen	1840	Blown down 1949.	
Spannum	Polder 61; 53°08′01″N 5°37′27″E	Spinnenkopmolen	Before 1832	Demolished before 1929.	
Spannum	Polder 62; 53°07′59″N 5°37′39″E		Before 1832	Demolished before 1929.	
Stavoren	De Peltrok; 52°52′45″N 5°22′22″E	Paltrokmolen	1718	Demolished 1809.	
Stavoren		Stellingmolen	Before 1815	Demolished post-1832.	
Stavoren		Stellingmolen	Before 1783	Demolished post-1815.	
Stavoren	Molen bij de Blauwe Brug; 52°53′03″N 5°21′30″E	Standerdmolen	Before 1616	Demolished before 1718.	
Stavoren	Molen van Gerben Siedzes; 52°53′14″N 5°21′57″E	Spinnenkopmolen	Before 1832	Demolished between 1880 and 1885.	
Stavoren	Nieuwe Noordermolen; 52°53′17″N 5°21′29″E	Stellingmolen	Before 1664	Demolished post-1830.	
Stavoren	Noordermeerpolder; 52°53′02″N 5°22′41″E	Grondzeiler	1620	Demolished 1916.	
Stavoren	Noordermolen; 52°53′09″N 5°21′32″E	Standerdmolen	Before 1399	Burnt down 1572.	
Stavoren	Polder 17; 52°53′25″N 5°22′18″E	Grondzeiler	Before 1832	Demolished before 1850.	
Stavoren	Polder 18; 52°53′23″N 5°21′43″E		Before 1873	Demolished before 1930.	
Stavoren	Polder 19; 52°52′55″N 5°22′07″E	Grondzeiler	Before 1832	Demolished before 1930.	
Stavoren	Polder 19a 52°52′32″N 5°22′04″E	Grondzeiler	Between 1850 and 1873	Demolished before 1929.	
Stavoren	Zuidermeerpolder; 52°52′41″N 5°22′26″E	Grondzeiler	Before 1620		
Stavoren	Zuidermeerpolder; 52°52′42″N 5°22′13″E	Grondzeiler	1620	Demolished between 1850 and 1933.	
Stavoren	Zuidermolen; 52°52′46″N 5°21′48″E	Standerdmolen	1572	Demolished before 1718.	
Stavoren	Zuidermolen; 52°52′48″N 5°21′42″E	Standerdmolen	Before 1560	Demolished c.1572.	
Steggerda	Polder 9; 52°52′30″N 6°04′33″E		Before 1877	Demolished before 1929.	
Steggerda	Polder 10; 52°52′42″N 6°04′55″E		1877	Demolished before 1929.	
Steggerda	Polder 11; 52°52′28″N 6°05′21″E	Spinnenkopmolen	1887	Demolished post-1934.	
Steggerda	Polder 134; 52°52′35″N 6°04′02″E		Before 1877	Demolished before 1924.	
Steggerda			Before 1882	Burnt down 1905.	
Steggerda	52°51′38″N 6°04′04″E		1887	Demolished post-1924.	
Steggerda	Steggerda Molen	Standerdmolen	Before 1543	Demolished post-1664.	
Steggerda	Steggerda Molen; 52°51′38″N 6°05′27″E	Standerdmolen	Before 1718	Demolished post-1732.	
Stiens	53°15′29″N 5°45′34″E		1847	Demolished 1853.	
Stiens	De Hoop; 53°15′29″N 5°45′34″E	Stellingmolen	1853	Demolished 1922.	
Stiens	De Hoop; 53°15′29″N 5°45′34″E	Stellingmolen	1978	Burnt down 1 January 1992.	
Stiens	De Hoop; 53°15′29″N 5°45′34″E	Stellingmolen	1992	Molendatabase (in Dutch)	
Stiens	De Kleine Molen; Binnema's Molen; Binnema's Mûne; 53°15′15″N 5°45′49″E	Grondzeiler	1988		
Stiens	De Steenhuistermolen; 53°16′07″N 5°49′15″E	Grondzeiler	1880		
Stiens	Korenmolen van Stiens; 53°15′44″N 5°45′07″E	Standerdmolen	Before 1399	Demolished post-1718.	
Stiens	Molen van Anna Vegelin van Claerbergen; 53°15′54″N 5°48′45″E		Before 1832	Demolished 1840.	
Stiens	Molen van het Doctor Popta Gasthuis; 53°15′15″N 5°45′49″E		Before 1832	Demolished post-1850.	
Stiens	Polder 1; 53°15′54″N 5°48′45″E	Grondzeiler	1841	Demolished 1929.	
Stiens	Polder 1a 53°16′11″N 5°47′34″E		1850	Demolished before 1928.	
Stiens	Polder 2; 53°16′03″N 5°49′05″E	Spinnenkopmolen	Before 1832	Demolished before 1928.	
Stiens	Polder 2a 53°16′02″N 5°49′17″E	Spinnenkopmolen	Before 1832	Demolished before 1850.	
Stiens	Polder 3; 53°15′42″N 5°49′41″E		Before 1832	Demolished before 1928.	
Stiens	Polder 18; 53°16′23″N 5°49′41″E	Spinnenkopmolen	Before 1873	Demolished post-1928.	
Stiens	Polder Binnema; 53°15′17″N 5°45′52″E	Grondzeiler	1913	Moved within Stiens 1988.	
Stiens	Waterverser Zwembad; 53°15′30″N 5°45′28″E	Grondzeiler	Before 1930	Demolished c.1955.	
Sumar	De Hoop; 53°10′44″N 5°59′51″E	Stellingmolen	1867	Burnt down 1881.	
Sumar	De Hoop; 53°10′44″N 5°59′51″E	Stellingmolen	1882		
Sumar	Korenmolen van Suameer; 53°10′48″N 5°59′49″E	Standerdmolen	Before 1718	Demolished 1772.	
Sumar	Polder 144; 53°10′38″N 5°58′55″E		Before 1854	Demolished before 1925.	
Sumar	Polder 144a 53°10′32″N 5°58′43″E	Spinnenkopmolen	Before 1832	Demolished between 1850 and 1874.	
Sumar	Polder 145; 53°10′39″N 5°58′59″E		Before 1850	Demolished before 1850.	
Sumar	Polder 145a 53°10′38″N 5°59′04″E		Before 1854	Demolished before 1925.	
Sumar	Polder 146; 53°10′52″N 5°01′47″E	Grondzeiler	Before 1832	Demolished before 1928.	
Surhuisterveen	Koartwâld; Feanstermoune; 53°11′03″N 6°10′59″E	Stellingmolen	1864		
Surhuisterveen		Achtkante molen			
Surhuisterveen	Korenmolen van Kortwoude; 53°11′03″N 6°10′53″E	Standerdmolen	Before 1664	Burnt down 1864.	
Surhuisterveen	Korenmolen van Sipma; 53°10′52″N 6°09′34″E	Stellingmolen	1850	Demolished 1937.	
Surhuisterveen	Molen van Jan Hulshof; 53°10′45″N 6°09′46″E		Before 1832	Demolished post-1850.	
Surhuisterveen	Polder 16; 53°10′50″N 6°09′53″E		Before 1854	Demolished before 1926.	
Surhuisterveen	Polder 17; 53°10′55″N 6°09′09″E		Before 1854	Demolished before 1920.	
Surhuisterveen	Polder 18; 53°10′41″N 6°08′23″E		1919	Demolished post-1920.	
Surhuisterveen	53°10′33″N 6°07′56″E		Before 1919	Demolished post-1920.	
Surhuisterveen	53°10′51″N 6°08′51″E		Before 1920	Demolished before 1929.	
Suwâld	Louwsmeerpolder; 53°11′11″N 5°52′39″E	Grondzeiler	1802	Moved to Lekkum 1825.	
Suwâld	Louwsmeerpolder; De Simson; 53°11′11″N 5°52′39″E	Grondzeiler	1847	Demolished 1926.	
Suwâld	Polder 70; 53°10′16″N 5°52′09″E	Grondzeiler	1832	Demolished c.1928.	
Suwâld	Polder 71; 53°10′27″N 5°52′05″E	Spinnenkopmolen	Before 1832	Demolished post-1930.	
Suwâld	Polder 72; 53°10′33″N 5°52′09″E	Spinnenkopmolen	1850	Demolished post-1925.	
Suwâld	Polder 130a 53°11′25″N 5°56′12″E		1832	Demolished post-1874.	
Suwâld	Polder 131; 53°11′19″N 5°55′03″E		Before 1854	Demolished before 1926.	
Suwâld	Polder 132; 53°11′24″N 5°54′40″E		Before 1854	Demolished before 1926.	
Suwâld	Polder 133; 53°11′14″N 5°55′19″E		Before 1832	Demolished c.1928.	
Suwâld	Polder 134; 53°11′11″N 5°55′13″E	Spinnenkopmolen	Before 1854	Demolished c.1928.	
Suwâld	Polder 134a 53°11′13″N 5°55′35″E		Between 1832 and 1850.	Demolished before 1874.	
Suwâld	Polder 135; 53°10′57″N 5°54′55″E		Before 1854	Demolished post-1926.	
Suwâld	Polder 135; 53°10′52″N 5°55′24″E		Before 1832	Demolished between 1850 and 1874.	
Suwâld	Polder 135; 53°10′43″N 5°55′34″E		Before 1850	Demolished before 1874.	
Suwâld	Polder 135; 53°10′42″N 5°55′14″E		Before 1832	Demolished between 1850 and 1874.	
Suwâld	Polder 135; 53°10′55″N 5°55′21″E	Weidemolen	Before 1832	Demolished between 1850 and 1874.	
Suwâld	Polder 136; 53°10′41″N 5°55′15″E		Before 1832	Demolished post-1926.	
Suwâld	Polder 137; 53°10′27″N 5°55′37″E		Before 1832	Demolished post-1930.	
Suwâld	Polder 137a 53°10′32″N 5°56′16″E		Before 1832	Demolished between 1850 and 1926.	
Suwâld	Polder 138; 53°10′24″N 5°55′57″E		Before 1832	Demolished post-1850.	
Suwâld	Polder 139; 53°10′16″N 5°55′41″E		Before 1854	Demolished post-1926.	
Suwâld	Polder 154; 53°11′12″N 5°58′37″E	Spinnenkopmolen	Before 1854	Demolished before 1926.	
Suwâld	Polder 155; 53°11′20″N 5°58′22″E		Before 1832	Demolished between 1874 and 1926.	
Suwâld	Polder 156; 53°11′39″N 5°57′56″E		Before 1832	Demolished post-1850.	
Suwâld	Polder 157; 53°11′36″N 5°57′10″E		Before 1832	Demolished before 1926.	
Suwâld	Polder A 53°12′13″N 5°57′36″E		Before 1854	Demolished before 1926.	
Suwâld	Polder Amerika; 53°11′21″N 5°56′44″E		Before 1854	Demolished beforfe 1926.	
Suwâld	53°11′47″N 5°57′22″E		1850	Demolished post-1930.	
Suwâld	53°11′12″N 5°53′07″E	Weidemolen	1832	Demolished post-1874.	
Swichum	Molen van de Kerk van Swigchem; 53°09′01″N 5°49′38″E	Spinnenkopmolen	Before 1832	Demolished post-1850.	
Swichum	Polder 4; 53°09′28″N 5°48′53″E		1841	Demolished between 1920 and 1925.	
Swichum	Polder 5 Polder van der Velde; 53°09′27″N 5°49′21″E	Spinnenkopmolen	Before 1832	Blown down 1935.	
Swichum	Polder 6; 53°09′08″N 5°49′38″E	Spinnenkopmolen	Before 1832	Demolished post-1930.	
Swichum	Polder 7; 53°09′04″N 5°49′34″E	Spinnenkopmolen	Before 1850	Demolished before 1929.	
Swichum	Polder 8; 53°08′46″N 5°49′22″E	Spinnenkopmolen	Before 1832	Demolished before 1929.	
Swichum	Polder 9; 53°09′06″N 5°49′05″E	Grondzeiler	1861	Demolished 1932, base demolished 1982.	
Swichum	53°09′22″N 5°48′59″E	Spinnenkopmolen	Before 1925	Demolished before 1942.	

== Notes ==
Mills still standing marked in bold. Known building dates are bold, otherwise the date is the earliest known date the mill was standing.
