= De Zwaluw, Burdaard =

Windmill in Burdaard, Netherlands

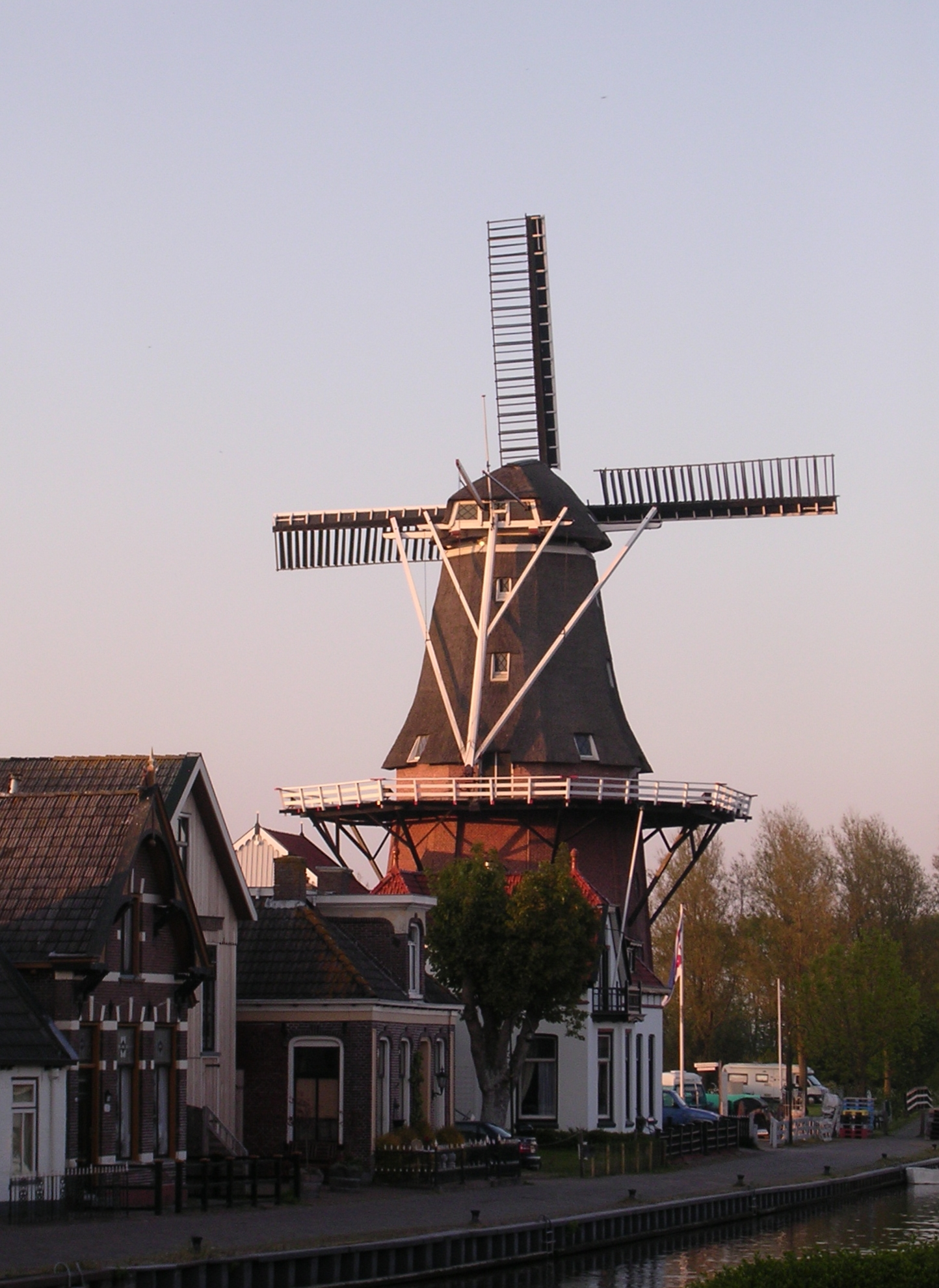
- De Zwaluw, May 2008

Origin
- Mill name: De Zwaluw
- Mill location: Mounewei 17, 9111 HB Burdaard
- Coordinates: 53°17′45″N 5°52′53″E
- Operator(s): Gemeente Ferwerderadiel
- Year built: 1987

Information
- Purpose: Corn mill, barley mill and sawmill
- Type: Smock mill
- Storeys: Two-storey smock
- Base storeys: Five-storey base
- Smock sides: Eight sides
- No. of sails: Four sails
- Type of sails: Patent sails
- Windshaft: Cast iron
- Winding: Tailpole and winch
- No. of pairs of millstones: Four pairs
- Type of saw: Frame saw with vertical blades

De Zwaluw (English: The Swallow) is a smock mill in Burdaard, Friesland, Netherlands which is working commercially. The mill is listed as a Rijksmonument, number 15585.

== History ==
The first mill on this site was a smock mill called De Windlust (English: The desire for wind) which was built for Douwe Dirks Drukker of Burum in 1841. This was a corn mill which stood 20 metres (22 yd) west of the present mill. Drukker sold the mill on 25 April 1851 to Klaas Freerks Steenhuizen for ƒ6,000. De Windlust was burnt down on 15 September 1874. De Zwaluw was built as a corn and pearl barley mill to replace it. The millwright was G R van Wieren of Smitshuis. De Zwaluw was built for Klaas Steenhuizen. Between 1875 and 1878, the base of a paltrok mill was placed alongside De Zwaluw and driven by the mill. Steenhuizen had four sons, two of which worked the mill. Paulus worked in the pearl barley mill and Jan worked the sawmill. De Zwaluw was built with Patent sails, one of the first mills in the north of the Netherlands so equipped.

After the death of his father, Paulus Steenhuizen moved into the mill house with his wife Berber Bosma. They had two daughters, Janke and Reinje. Janke helped her father in the mill. She married Anne Hessel de Groot, who took over the mill after the death of Paulus Steenhuizen on 26 March 1936. In 1954, the mill lost a pair of sails. It worked by wind in this condition until 1960. The mill was worked in its latter years by Anne Hessel de Groot and Tjebbe Overzet until the death of Anne Hessel de Groot on 8 April 1966. The mill was listed as a Rijksmonument in 1971. On 11 November 1972, the mill was struck by lightning and burnt down, leaving the base and saw mill standing. Tjebbe Overzet died in 1974. The mill is now in the ownership of the Gemeente Ferwerderadiel.

Restoration by Fabrikaat Buurma of Oudeschans, Groningen was started in 1984 and completed in 1987. When first restored, the mill had two Common sails and two Patent sails, but it now carries four Patent sails.

When the mill was first restored it was only as a landmark. Much of the equipment for milling was missing. Miller Jan Tollenaar finally got De Zwaluw restored as a working windmill in October 1988. At first, trade was rather slow, but this improved after De Hoop, Stiens burnt down. Former customers of De Hoop then came to De Zwaluw. When De Hoop was rebuilt, trade there was slow because it had lost its market. The business at De Zwaluw has expanded to include a campsite and moorings.

The mill lies alongside the Dokkummer Ee, and is passed by participants in the Elfstedentocht. The mill is grinding on a daily basis, with the sawmill at work on Saturdays.

== Description ==
De Zwaluw is what the Dutch describe as an "achtkante stellingmolen". It is a smock mill with a stage. The brick base is five storeys with the stage at fourth-floor level, 12.50 metres (41 ft 0 in) above ground level. The two-storey smock is thatched as is the cap, which is winded by a tailpole and winch. The four Patent sails, which have a span of 23.60 metres (77 ft 5 in), are carried in a cast-iron windshaft which was cast by Ijzergieterij Versteeg-Ensink of Hardinxveld-Giessendam in 1985. This was the first windshaft cast by Versteeg-Ensink.

The windshaft also carries the brake wheel which has 70 cogs. This drives the conical lantern pinion wallower (38 staves) at the top of the upright shaft. At the bottom of the upright shaft, the great spur wheel drives four pairs of millstones. Two pairs are used for making flour and two pairs are used to produce pearl barley. The flour stones are each driven by a stone nut with 30 staves and the pearl barley stones are each driven by a stone nut with 20 staves. A lantern pinion with 35 staves drives carries the drive to the saw via a shaft. At the opposite end of this shaft, a gear with 35 cogs drives a wallower with 44 cogs. This drives a gear with 26 cogs which drives another gear with 51 cogs on the axle of the frame saw.

== Millers ==
De Windlust

- Douwe Durks Drukker 1841-51
- Klaas Freerks Steenhuizen 1851-74

De Zwaluw

- Klaas Freerks Steenhuizen 1874-
- Paulus Steenhuizen -1936
- Jan Steenhuizen
- Janke Steenhuizen
- Anne Hessel de Groot -1966
- Tjebbe Overzet -1966
- Jan Tollenaar 1988 to date

References for above:-

== Public access ==
The mill is open to the public 1 May to 1 October, Tuesday to Saturday 10:00 to 12:00 and 13:30 - 1700, and at other times by appointment.
