= De Korenaar, Sexbierum =

Windmill in Sexbierum, Netherlands

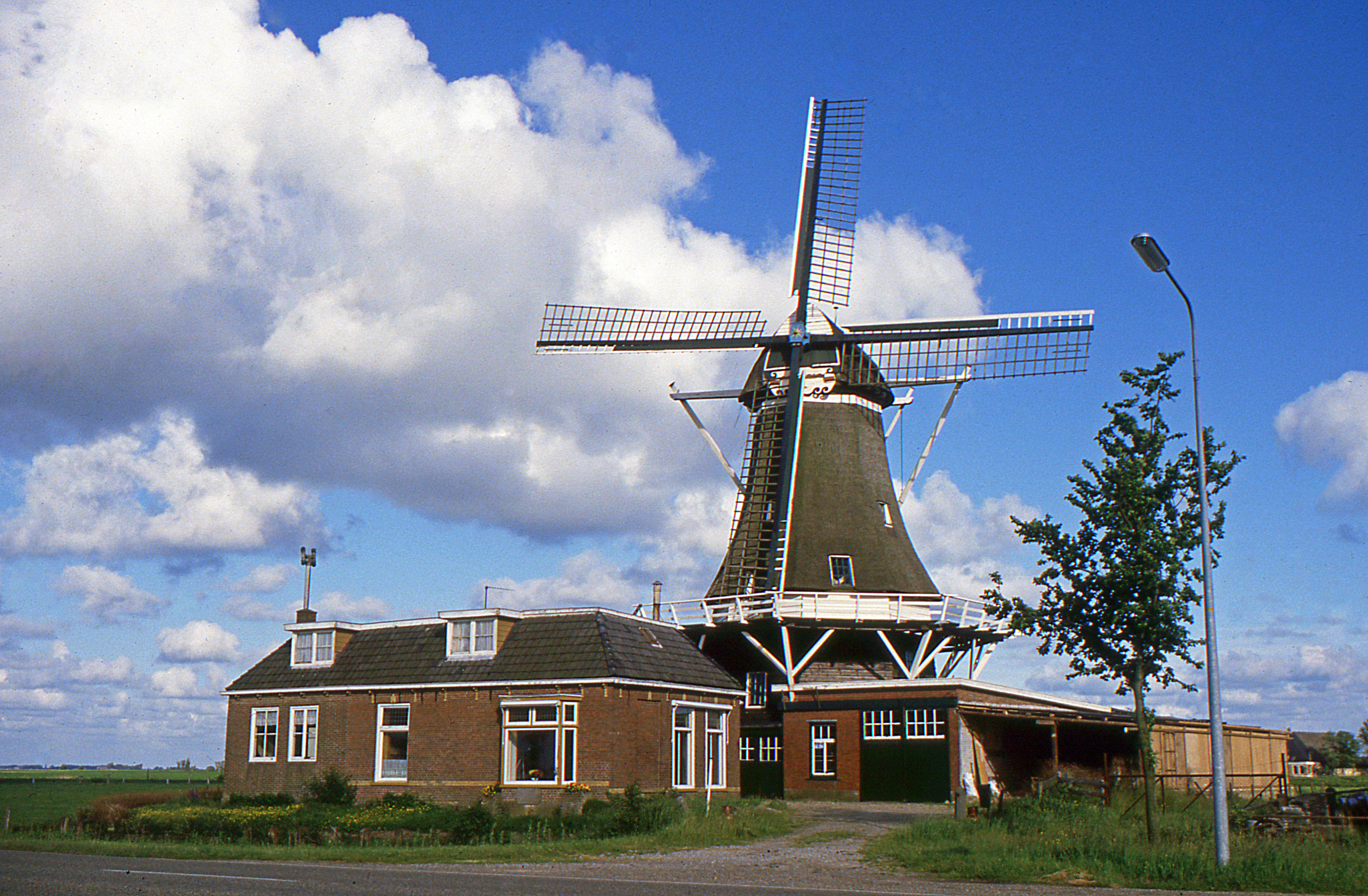
- De Korenaar, 1985

Origin
- Mill name: De Korenaar
- Mill location: Hearewei 30, 8855 AZDJ Sexbierum
- Coordinates: 53°13′19″N 5°29′20″E
- Operator(s): Private
- Year built: 1868

Information
- Purpose: Corn mill, formerly also a pearl barley mill
- Type: Smock mill
- Storeys: Three storey smock
- Base storeys: Two storey base
- Smock sides: Eight sides
- No. of sails: Four sails
- Type of sails: Common sails
- Windshaft: Cast iron
- Winding: Tailpole and winch
- No. of pairs of millstones: Two pairs
- Size of millstones: 1.50 metres (4 ft 11 in) diameter

De Korenaar (English: The Ear of Corn) is a smock mill in Sexbierum, Friesland, Netherlands which was built in 1868 and is in working order. The mill is listed as a Rijksmonument.

== History ==
De Korenaar was built in 1868, replacing a mill that had burnt down in 1867. It is a corn mill, but was also formerly a pearl barley mill. The mill was restored in 1990-91 by millwright Hiemstra of Tzummarum, Friesland. The mill is listed as a Rijksmonument, No. 8648.

== Description ==
De Korenaar is what the Dutch describe as a "Stellingmolen". It is a smock mill on a brick base. The stage is 5.95 metres (19 ft 6 in) above ground level. The smock and cap are thatched. The mill is winded by tailpole and winch. The sails are Common sails. One pair has a span of 21.72 metres (71 ft 3 in), the other pair span 21.82 metres (71 ft 7 in). The sails are carried on a cast-iron windshaft. The windshaft also carries the brake wheel, which has 57 cogs. This drives the wallower (28 cogs) at the top of the upright shaft. At the bottom of the upright shaft is the great spur wheel, which has 100 cogs. The great spur wheel drives a pair of French Burr millstones via a lantern pinion stone nut which has 24 staves and a pair of Cullen millstones via a lantern pinion stone nut which has 26 staves. The millstones are 1.50 metres (4 ft 11 in) diameter.

== Public access ==
De Korenaar is open to the public on Saturdays between 11:00 and 17:00, Sundays between 13:00 and 17:00, or by appointment.
