= De Kleine Molen, Stiens =

Mill in Stiens, Netherlands

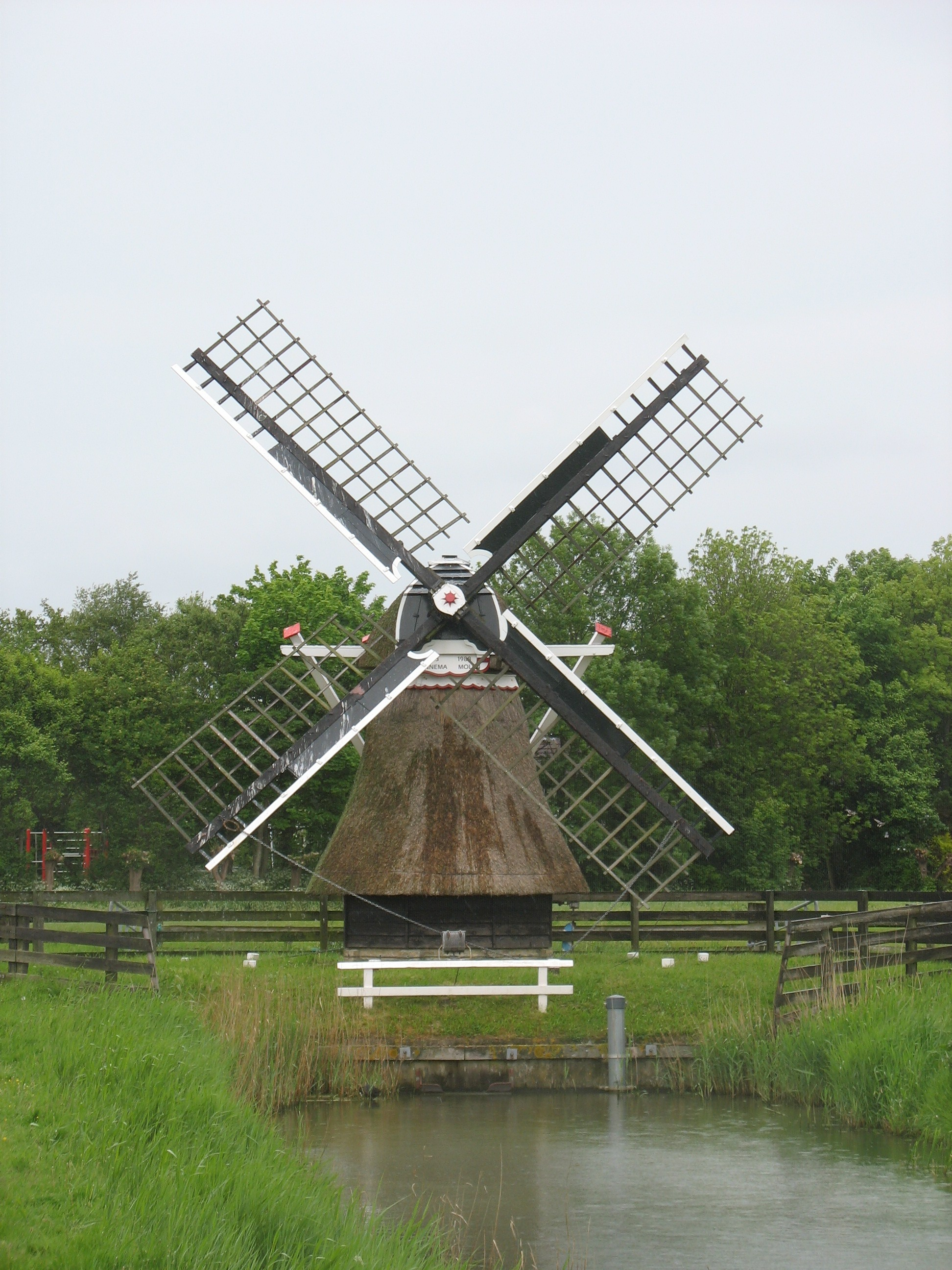
- De Kleine Molen, May 2008.

Origin
- Mill name: De Kleine Molen; Binnema's Molen
- Mill location: Brédijk, 9051HZ, Stiens
- Coordinates: 53°15′15″N 5°45′49″E
- Operator(s): Stichting De Fryske Mole
- Year built: 1913; 112 years ago 1968; 57 years ago (restored); 1988; 37 years ago (moved)

Information
- Purpose: Drainage mill
- Type: Smock mill
- Storeys: One storey smock
- Base storeys: Low base
- Smock sides: Eight sides
- No. of sails: Four sails
- Type of sails: Common sails
- Windshaft: Cast iron
- Winding: Tailpole and winch
- Auxiliary power: Electric motor
- Type of pump: Centrifugal pump
- Other information: Smallest mill of its type in the Netherlands.

De Kleine Molen (English: The Little Mill) is a smock mill in Stiens, Friesland, Netherlands which was built in 1913 and moved in 1988. The mill is the smallest of its type in the Netherlands. In working order, it is listed as a Rijksmonument.

== History ==
De Kleine Molen was originally built in 1913, it is also known as Binnema's Molen. It was restored in 1968. It was sold to Stichting De Fryske Mole on 1 March 1987, the 40th mill bought by that organisation. The mill was moved 60 metres (66 yd) in 1988 by millwright Tacoma of Stiens. The smallest mill of its type in the Netherlands, it is listed as a Rijksmonument, No. 24546.

== Description ==
De Kleine Molen is what the Dutch describe as a Grondzeiler. It is a single storey smock mill on a low base. There is no stage, the sails reaching almost to ground level. The mill is winded by tailpole and winch. The smock and cap are thatched. The sails are Common sails They have a span of 9.00 metres (29 ft 6 in). The sails are carried on a cast iron windshaft, which was cast by the Gietijzerij Hardinxveld-Giessendam in 1986. The windshaft carries the brake wheel which has 27 cogs. This drives the wallower (15 cogs) at the top of the upright shaft. At the bottom of the upright shaft a crown wheel with 25 cogs drives a shaft via a pinion with 15 cogs. At the other end of this shaft a wallower with 40 teeth drives a centrifugal pump via a gearwheel with 20 teeth. The pump can also be driven by electricity.

== Public access ==
De Kleine Molen is open to the public by appointment.
