= De Steenhuistermolen, Stiens =

Smock mill in Friesland, Netherlands

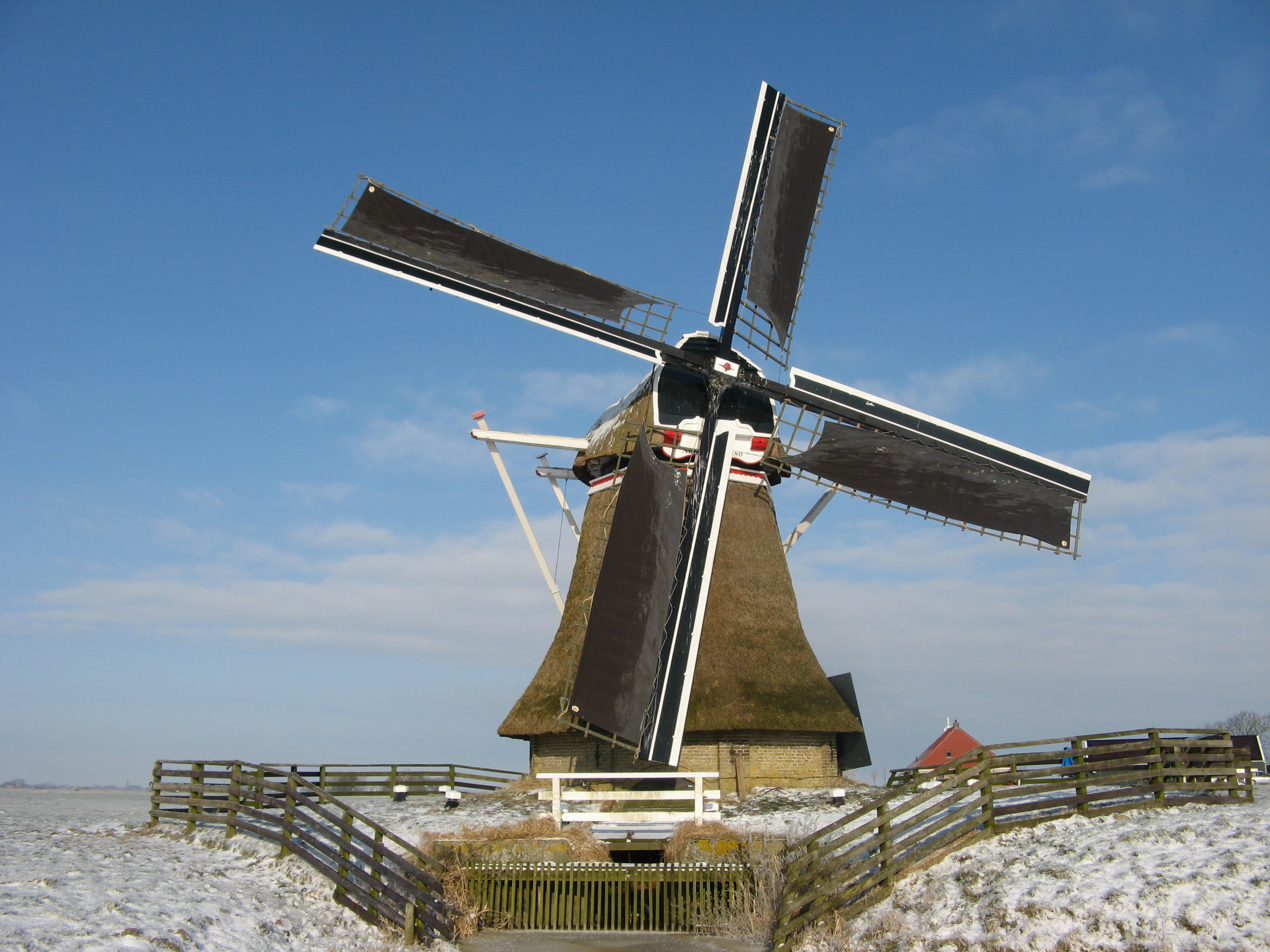
- De Steenhuistermolen, February 2012.

Origin
- Mill name: De Steenhuistermolen
- Mill location: Wurgedyk 18, 9051 LE, Stiens
- Coordinates: 53°16′07″N 5°49′15″E
- Operator(s): Stichting De Fryske Mole
- Year built: 1880

Information
- Purpose: Drainage mill
- Type: Smock mill
- Storeys: Two storey smock
- Base storeys: One storey base
- Smock sides: Eight sides
- No. of sails: Four sails
- Type of sails: Common sails
- Windshaft: Cast iron
- Winding: Tailpole and winch
- Auxiliary power: Electric motor
- Type of pump: Archimedes' screw

De Steenhuistermolen is a smock mill in Stiens, Friesland, Netherlands which was built in 1880. The mill is in working order and designated as being in reserve. It is listed as a Rijksmonument.

== History ==
De Steenhuistermolen was built in 1880. Following storm damage in 1952, a windpump was erected to take over from De Steenhuistermolen. The mill was restored in 1955. Following damage in 1966, it was restored again in 1967. In 1969, an electric motor was installed to drive the Archimedes' screw. The mill was sold to Stichting De Fryske Mole on 4 September 1985, the 34th mill bought by that organisation. A further restoration was carried out in 2000. In 2006, the mill was officially designated as being in reserve. It is listed as a Rijksmonument, No.24547.

== Description ==
De Steenhuistermolen is what the Dutch describe as a Grondzeiler. It is a two-storey smock mill on a single storey base. There is no stage, the sails reaching almost to ground level. The mill is winded by tailpole and winch. The smock and cap are thatched. The sails are Common sails. They have a span of 15.04 metres (49 ft 4 in). The sails are carried on a cast iron windshaft, which was cast by the Gietijzerij Hardinxveld-Giessendam in 1986. The windshaft carries the brake wheel which has 45 cogs. This drives the wallower (23 cogs) at the top of the upright shaft. At the bottom of the upright shaft there are two crown wheels The upper crown wheel, which has 35 cogs drives an Archimedes' screw via a crown wheel. The lower crown wheel, which has 30 cogs is carried on the axle of an Archimedes' screw, which is used to drain the polder. The axle of the screw is 41 centimetres (1 ft 4 in) diameter. The screw is 97 centimetres (3 ft 2 in) diameter. It is inclined at 22°. Each revolution of the screw lifts 278 litres (61 imp gal) of water.

== Public access ==
De Steenhuistermolen is open to the public by appointment.
