= De Hoop, Stiens =

Smock mill in Stiens, Friesland, Netherlands

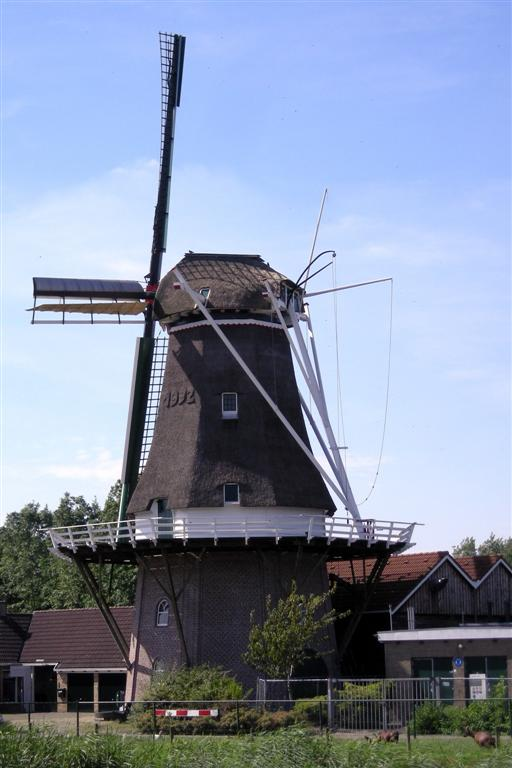
- De Hoop
- Interactive map of De Hoop, Stiens

Origin
- Mill name: De Hoop
- Mill location: Mounepaed 5 9051 BA Stiens
- Coordinates: 53.2581°N 5.7595°E
- Operator: Stichting Molen De Hoop
- Year built: 1993

Information
- Purpose: Corn mill
- Type: Smock mill
- Storeys: Three-storey smock
- Base storeys: Three-storey base
- Smock sides: Eight sides
- No. of sails: Four sails
- Type of sails: Two Common sails (Fok system on leading edges), two Ten Have sails, (Van Bussel system on leading edges).
- Windshaft: Cast iron
- Winding: Tailpole and winch
- Auxiliary power: Electric
- No. of pairs of millstones: Two pairs, with a third driven by an electric motor.
- Size of millstones: 1.40 metres (4 ft 7 in) diameter and 1.50 metres (4 ft 11 in)

De Hoop (English: The Hope) is a smock mill in Stiens, Friesland, Netherlands which was rebuilt in 1993 after the earlier mill burned down. It is operational and run by volunteers.

== History ==
The first mill on this site was built in 1847 but stood only a few years before new owner Jan Pieters Duinkerk had it replaced by a larger mill which was finished in 1854 and operated by his son Pieter Jans Duinkerk. The new mill changed hands several times, the successive owners were Auke Jacobs Bakker, Dirk Jans van der Wal and Jan Johannes van der Leij. Van der Leij's son Johannes Jans inherited the mill and kept milling until the smock was demolished in 1922. The base was left standing and survived for over half a century as storage space.

In 1976 the municipality Leeuwarderadeel bought the base and had the mill rebuilt by millwright Tacoma from Stiens. By 1979 the mill was back in full working order. A company "Molen De Hoop BV" was formed with local baker J. Bijlsma as the driving force behind the commercial operation of the mill. Miller was G.J. Klijnstra, later accompanied by S. Kuipers.

In the early morning on New Year's Day 1992 a fireworks rocket set fire to the thatched smock, resulting in the destruction of mill. The insurance companies and the municipality all quickly agreed on rebuilding the mill which meant the new mill was completed in less than 16 months after the fire. The rebuild had the added bonus of having the opportunity to redesign and modernise the mill resulting in among others a state of the art computer-controlled production line. At the reopening on 23 April 1993 J. Bijlsma called the mill "the most modern corn mill in the world". The total construction cost exceeded ƒ2 million of which ƒ26.000 was raised by the local population.

Unfortunately, despite the speedy reconstruction and modernization, customers had turned to other suppliers such as De Zwaluw, Burdaard and demand for traditionally ground flour was found too low to keep the mill profitable. In 1997 the mill stopped milling commercially. After a few years of standstill the mill is now run by volunteers on a weekly basis. It is also a training mill for the Frisian Millers Guild.

== Description ==
De Hoop is what the Dutch describe as a "stellingmolen" . It is a three-storey smock mill on a three-storey base. The stage is at third-floor level, 7.00 metres (23 ft 0 in) above ground level. The smock and cap are thatched. The mill is winded by tailpole and winch with a continuous chain. The cap rotates on 24 wooden blocks. The sails on the outer sailstock are Common sails, with leading edges streamlined on the Fok system. The sails on the inner sailstock are Ten Have sails, with leading edges fitted with aerofoils on the Van Bussel system. Both have a span of 24.55 metres (80 ft 7 in). The sails are carried on a cast-iron windshaft, which was cast by IJzergieterij Hardinxveld-Giessendam as number 47. The windshaft also carries the brake wheel which has 65 cogs. This drives the wallower (32 cogs) at the top of the upright shaft. At the bottom of the upright shaft, the great spur wheel, which has 87 cogs, drives the two lantern pinion stone nuts, which have 27 and 28 staves. These drive the 1.40 metres (4 ft 7 in) and 1.50 metres (4 ft 11 in) diameter millstones. A third pair of stones is driven by an electric motor so production could continue on days when there was not enough wind. Several modern developments were added during the 1992 rebuild. A chain elevator lifted grain from the ground floor to the grain silos on the third floor (first floor in the smock) from where it could be fed by gravity to one of the pairs of millstones. The grain flow to the silos and from silo to millstone was computer controlled by pneumatically operated valves. Also a central dust extraction system was added. Flour was collected on the first floor in a large silo and mixer from where it could be bagged on the ground floor. Unfortunately following years of standstill and disuse these systems are no longer functional. The ground floor also houses a small shop selling flour and bread making products.

== Public access ==
De Hoop is open to the public every Saturday from 10:00 to 16:00 hours.
