= Stiens =

- Village
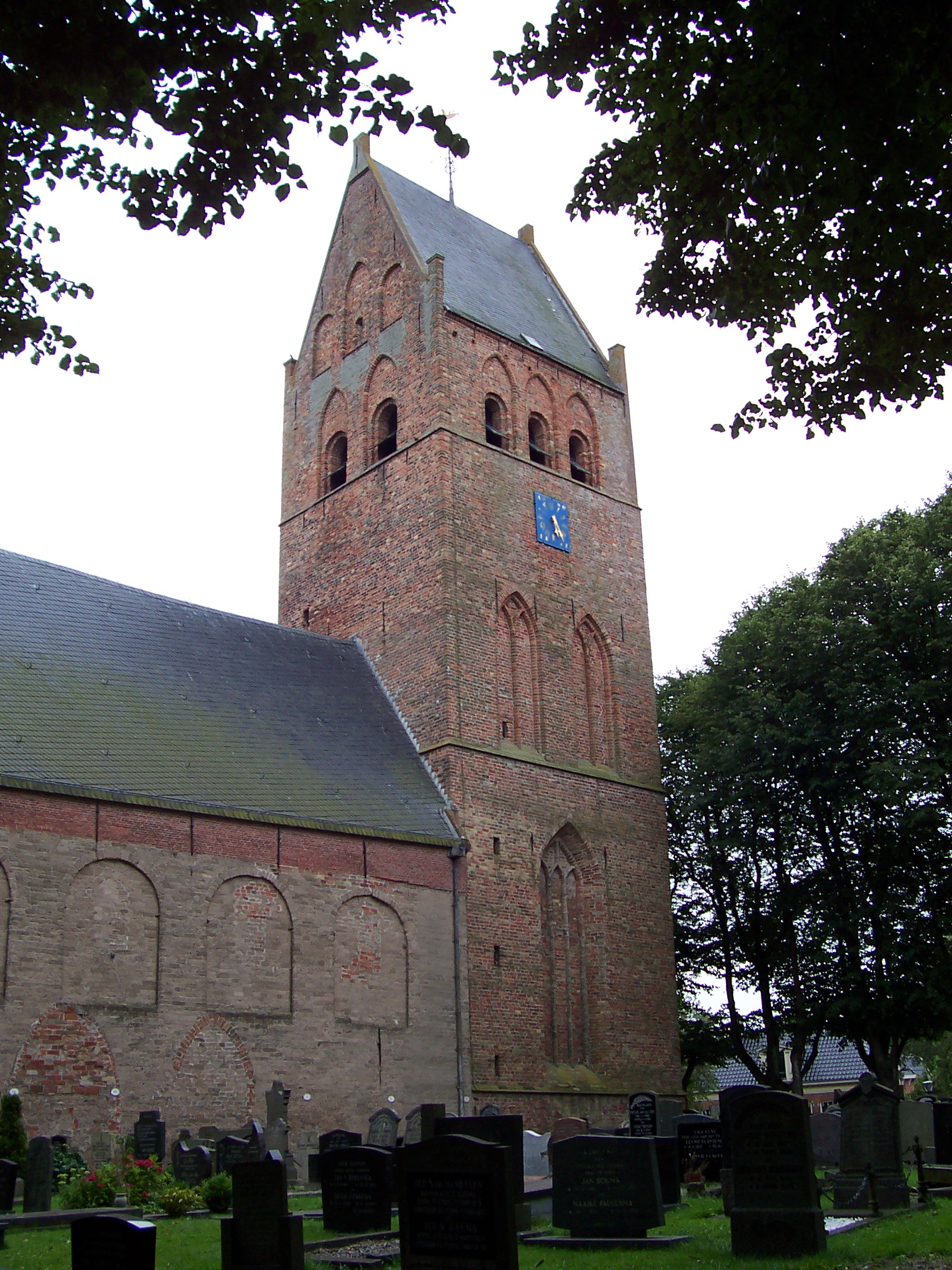
- St Vitus' Church

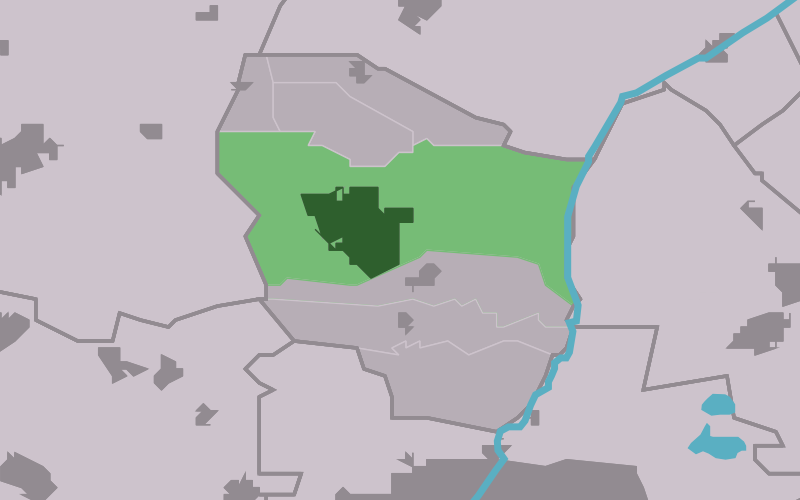
- Location in (former) Leeuwarderadeel municipality

- Location in the Netherlands Stiens (Netherlands)
- Country: Netherlands
- Province: Friesland
- Municipality: Leeuwarden

Area
  - Total: 18.07 km^{2} (6.98 sq mi)
- Elevation: 0.9 m (3.0 ft)

Population (2021)
  - Total: 7,695
  - Density: 425.8/km^{2} (1,103/sq mi)
- Time zone: UTC+1 (CET)
  - Summer (DST): UTC+2 (CEST)
- Postal code: 9051
- Dialing code: 058

Stiens is a town in the municipality of Leeuwarden, Netherlands. As of January 2017, the town had a population of about 7,545. Between 1944 and 2018, it was the capital of the municipality of Leeuwarderadeel.

== History ==
The village was first mentioned in the 13th century as Steninge, and means settlement of the people of Stena (person). Staining in Lancashire, England has the same origin. Stiens is a terp (artificial living mound) village with a radial structure which developed before our era along the Middelzee. There are additional terps to the north and south of the main terp on which the church was built. The western part of the main terp was later lost in floods.

The nave of the Dutch Reformed Church dates from around 1100. The tower dates from the 15th century and was restored in 1898. In 1840, Stiens was home to 1,617 people. In 1933, a monument was erected for Pieter Jelles Troelstra, however it is not for his achievements as a politician, but as a poet. The capital of the municipality of Leeuwarderadeel was the village of Huizum. In 1944, the southern part of the municipality including Huizum was annexed by Leeuwarden, and Stiens became the new capital of Leeuwarderadeel.

Before 2018, the town was part of the Leeuwarderadeel municipality. The town hall of the municipality was located in Stiens.

== Railways ==
Stiens was the main station on the North Friesland Railway. It opened in April 1901, with a branch to Harlingen opening in stages between December 1902 and May 1904. Closures of the railway include the following

- Direct service to Franeker in October 1933;
- Direct service to Harlingen in May 1935 and freight in January 1938;
- All other passenger services ceased in July 1936, but were reopened as far as Tzummarum and Dokkum-Aalsum in May 1940;
- The passenger service to Dokkum-Aalsum closed again in December 1940 and then it became permanently closed in October 1942;
- The final freight service from Stiens to Leeuwarden closed in 1997.

== Windmills ==
There are three windmills in Stiens, including De Hoop, De Kleine Molen, and De Steenhuistermolen.

== Notable people ==
- Abe Bonnema (1926-2001), architect
- Piet Dankert (1934-2003), politician
- Pieter Jelles Troelstra (1860-1930), politician

== Gallery ==
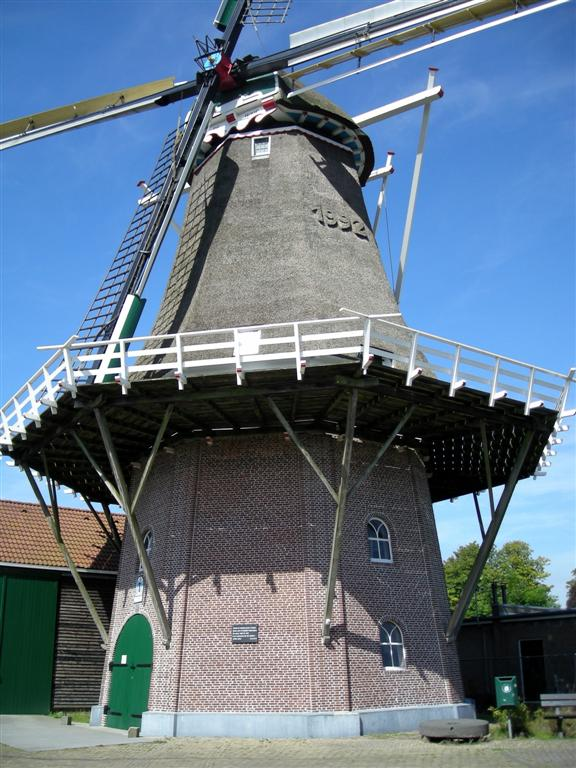
De Hoop

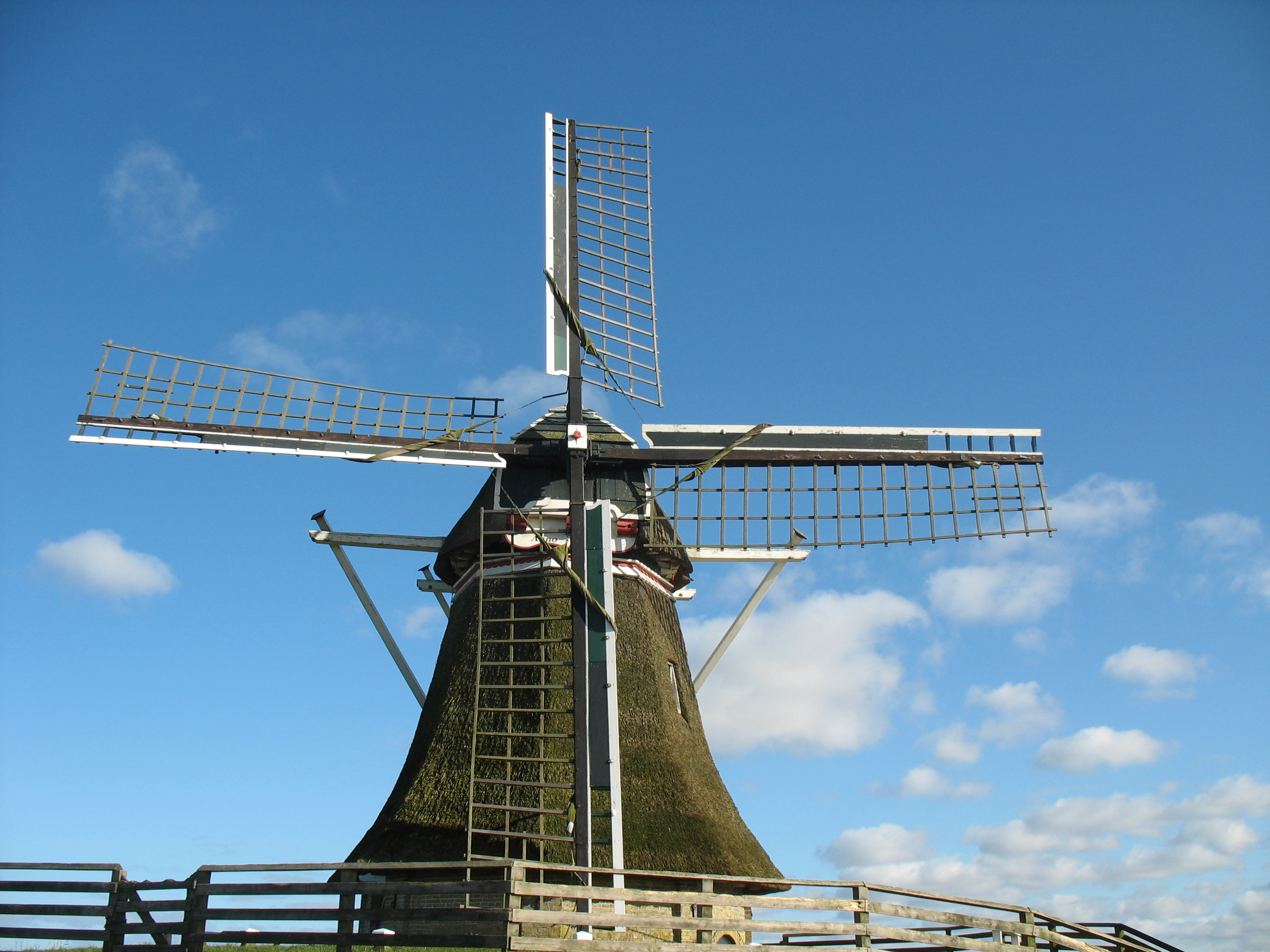
Steenhuistermolen

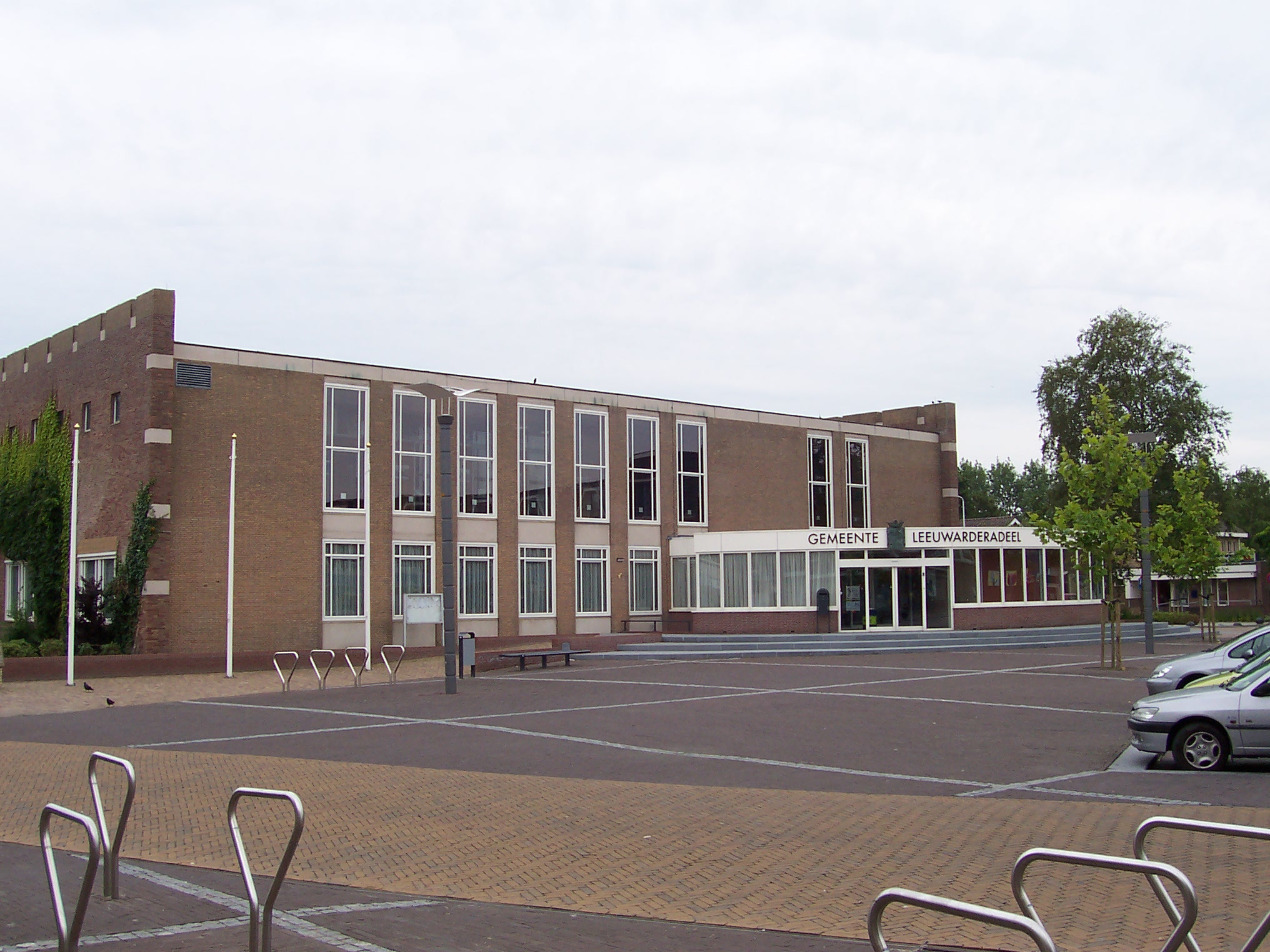
Former town hall

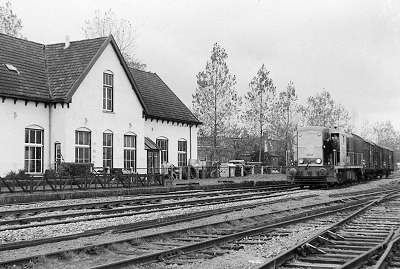
Former railway station (1974)

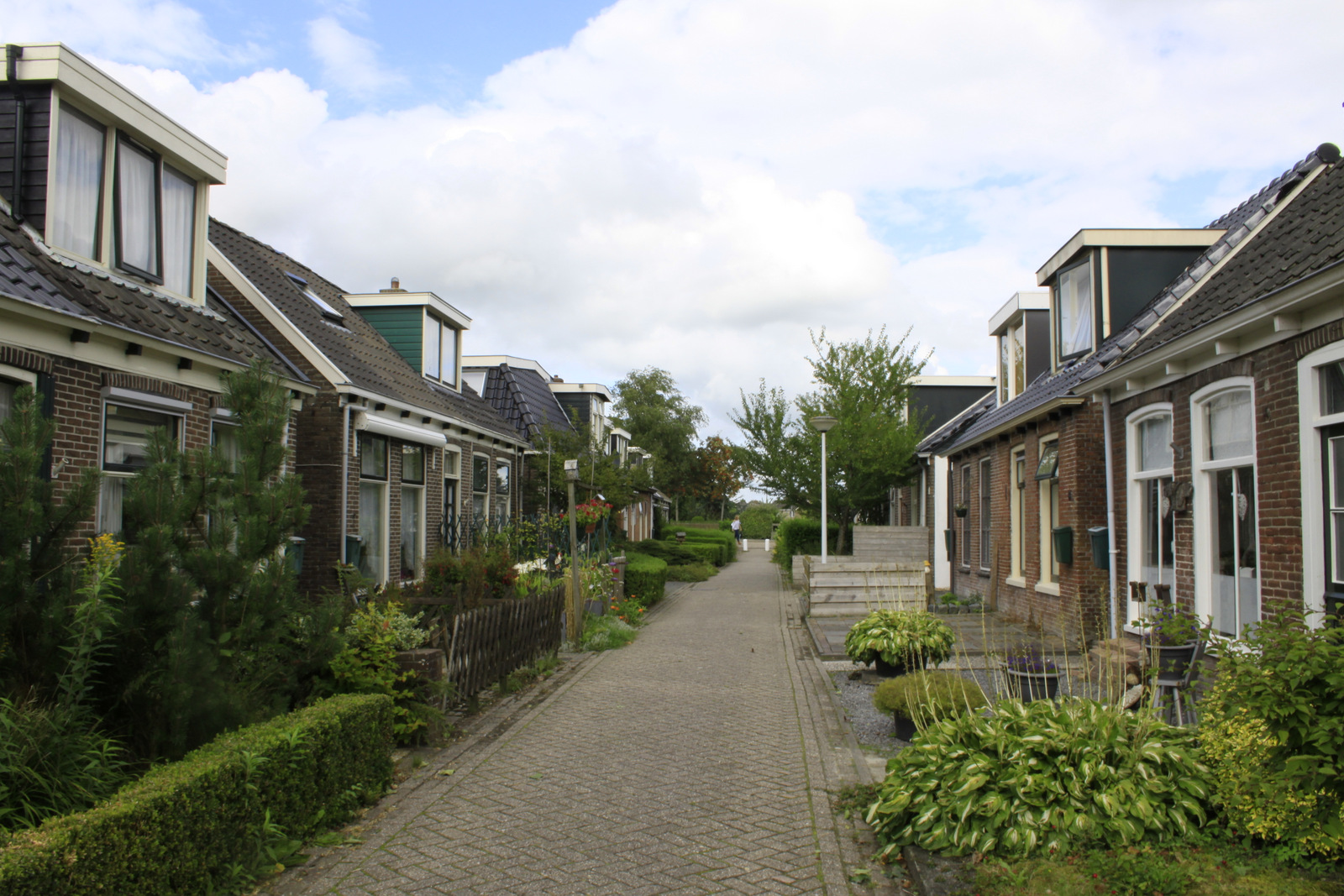
Street view

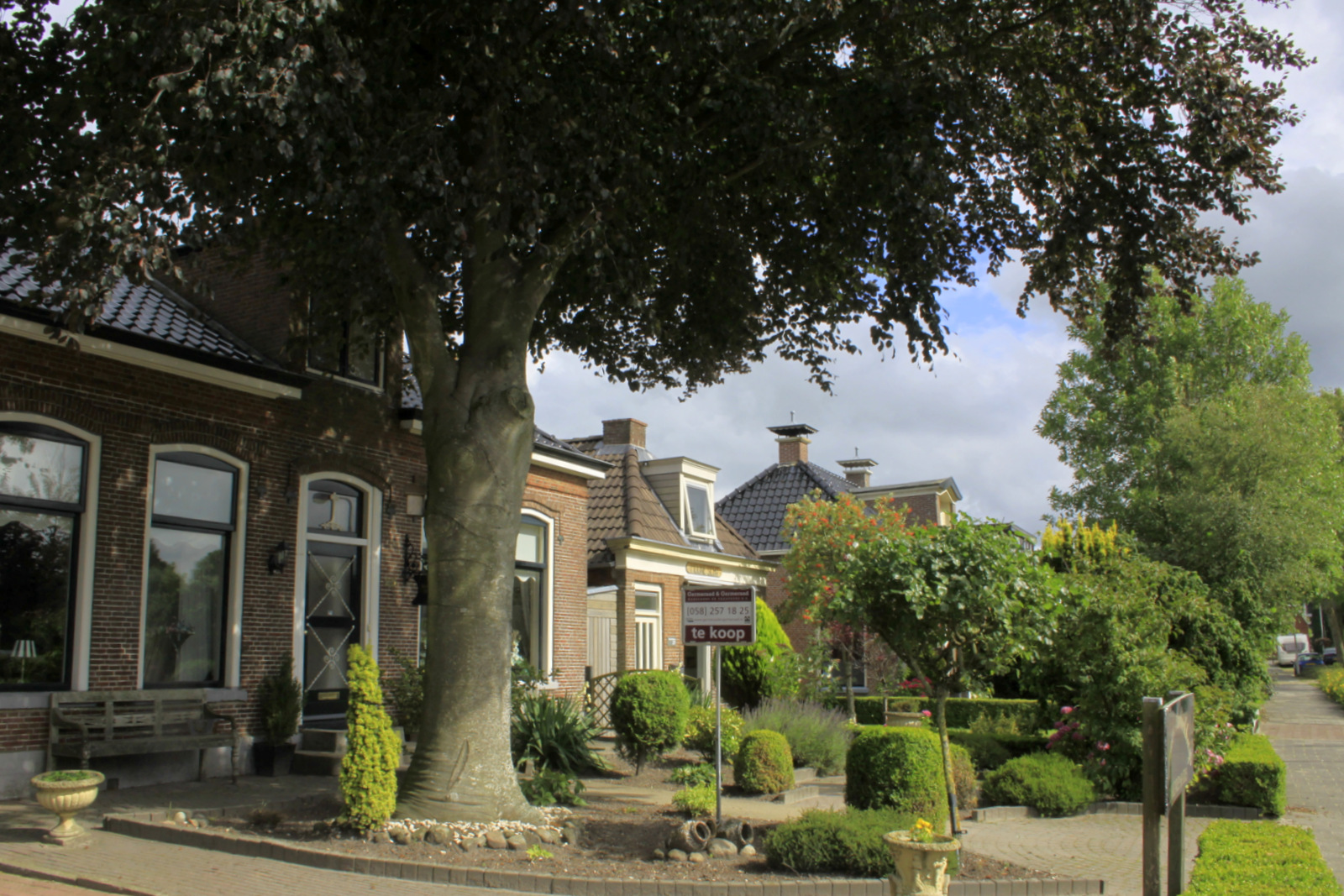
Houses in Stiens
