= Mûnein =

Mûnein Molenend
- Village
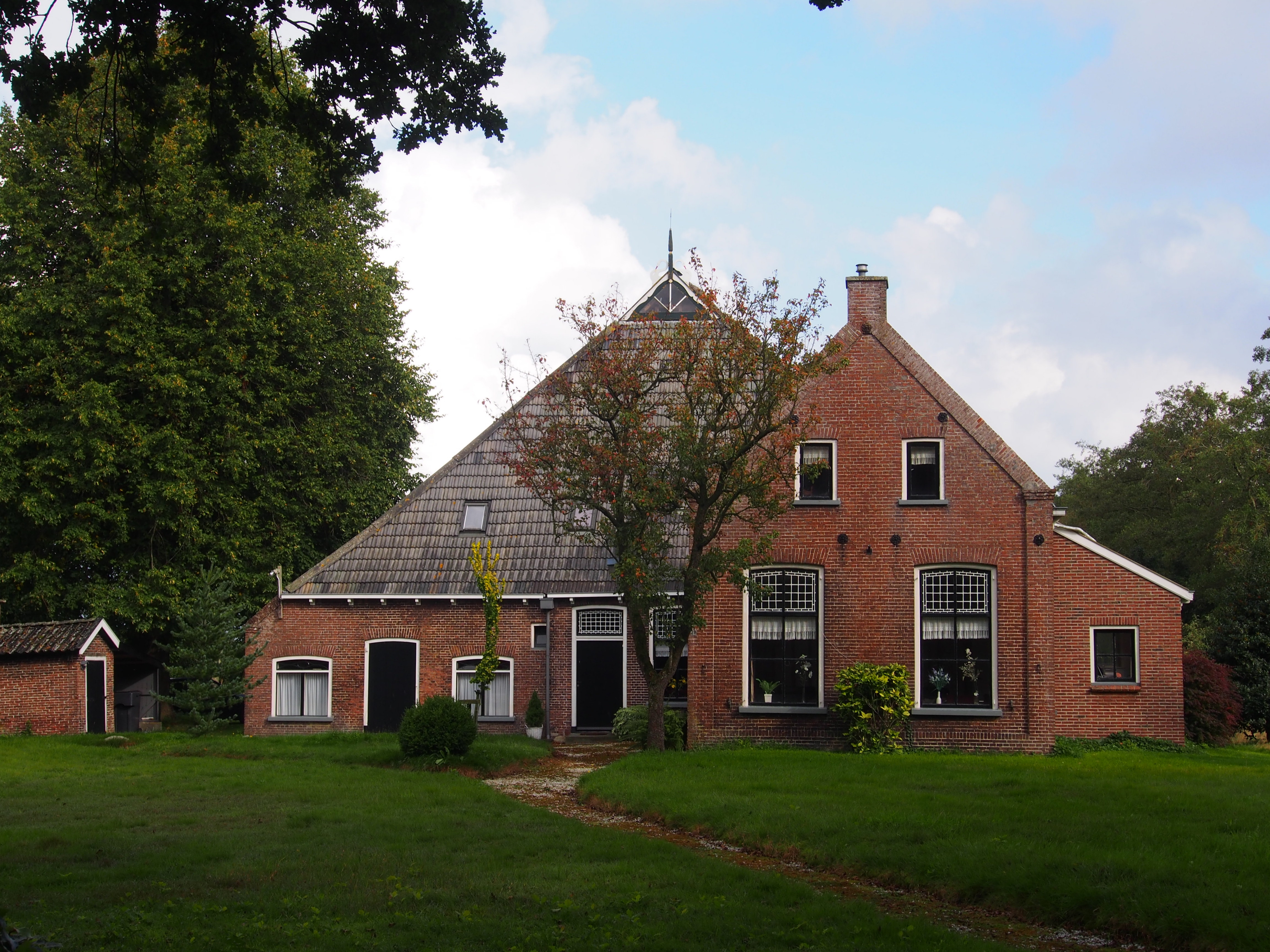
- Local farmhouse

- Coat of arms

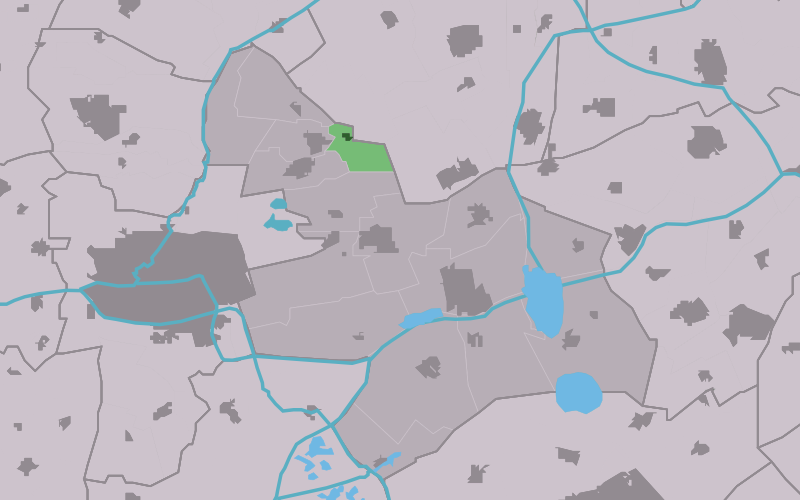
- Location of the village in Tytsjerksteradiel

- Location in the Netherlands Mûnein (Netherlands)
- Country: Netherlands
- Province: Friesland
- Municipality: Tytsjerksteradiel

Area
  - Total: 4.63 km^{2} (1.79 sq mi)
- Elevation: −0.7 m (−2.3 ft)

Population (2021)
  - Total: 640
  - Density: 140/km^{2} (360/sq mi)
- Time zone: UTC+1 (CET)
  - Summer (DST): UTC+2 (CEST)
- Postal code: 9063
- Dialing code: 058

Mûnein (Dutch: Molenend) is a village in Tytsjerksteradiel municipality in the province Friesland of the Netherlands. It had a population of around 580 in 2018.

== History ==
Until 1948 was Mûnein a part of Oentsjerk. At the request of "Dorpsbelang" (Village Interest) Mûnein received village status. Until then, it was customary for village status to be given to areas with a church which Mûnein did not have. But because there is a pub, a primary school and several associations, the municipality Tytsjerksteradiel gave village status on 8 October 1948.

Since 1953 Mûnein is officially part of the Trynwalden a region on a sand bar which includes the villages of Oentsjerk. Gytsjerk, Aldtsjerk and Readtsjerk.

=== Flax factory ===
It was Baron Theo van Welderen Rengers of Heemstra State, who stimulated the construction of the flax factory. He was a member of the commission Door Arbeid tot Verbetering, which was founded by his father, Julius Wilco. On 6 May 1898, an application was submitted at the municipality Tytsjerksteradiel to build a factory near the Swarte Broek, a lake near Mûnein. Thus the first factory of the "N.V. Friesche Maatschappij van Vlasindustrie" was built in Mûnein. The name can be seen in colorful tiles on the roof and on the front of the factory. The location of the Swarte Broek was chosen because the flax had to first go through a rotting process in the open waters. The opening of the factory took place on 24 November 1898 with J.J. Westra as director. The plant was closed on 24 April 1967. The restored chimney and a statue on the square in town still refer to the time of the flax processing. Today there is a facility for the mentally handicapped in the old flax factory and by the tall chimney still be seen from afar.

=== Siamese twins ===
Mûnein became national news in 1953 at the birth of Siamese twins on 8 November 1953. Village Doctor Wijthoff was present at the birth of her seventh child, but she gave birth to two babies joined at the stomach. They were rushed by taxi to the Diakonessenhuis, a hospital in Leeuwarden. The babies were in good conditions and examination revealed they had their own hearts, lungs and other organs. They were physically independent of each other. It was discussed with an English physician who had experience with a separation of Siamese twins. Seven months after birth, in 1954 the twins underwent surgery to separate them. They were the first Siamese twins in the Netherlands who had been successfully separated.

== Community ==
=== Population ===
- 1954 - 791
- 1969 - 775
- 1964 - 731
- 1969 - 666
- 1974 - 638
- 2006 - 701

=== Notable people ===
- Lieuwe Westra (1982) - cyclist

== Gallery ==
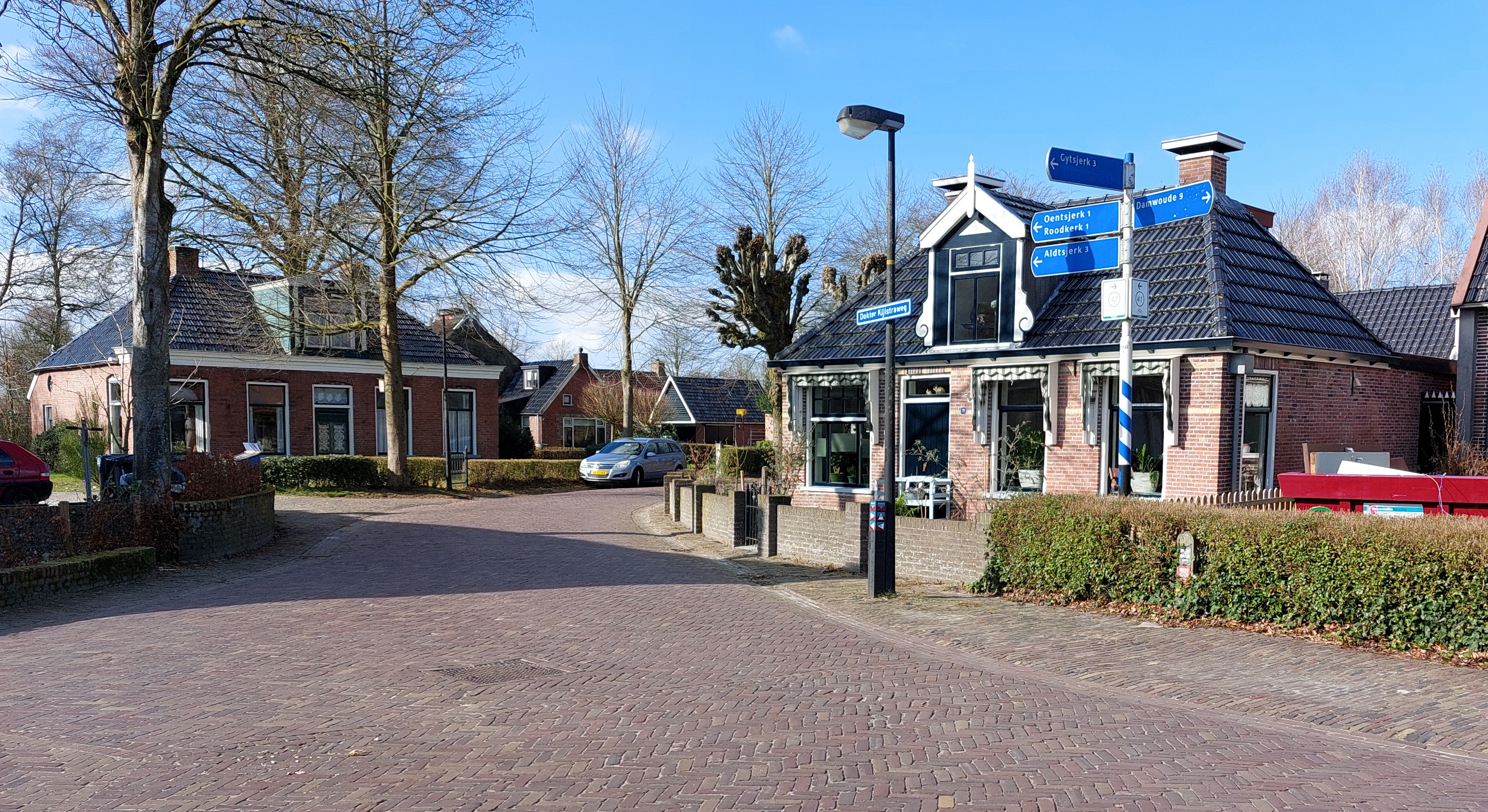
Houses in the village

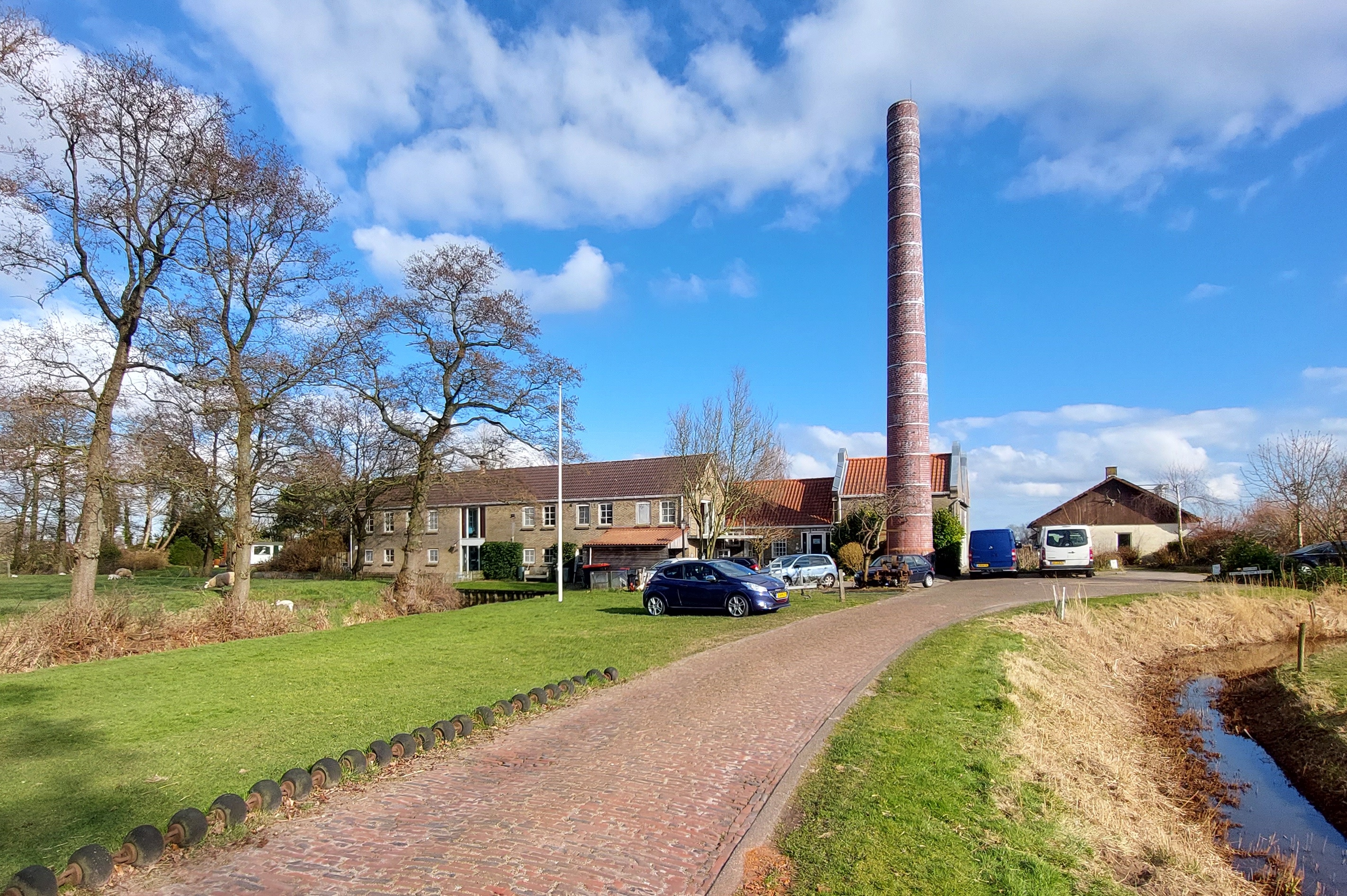
Chimney of the flax factory

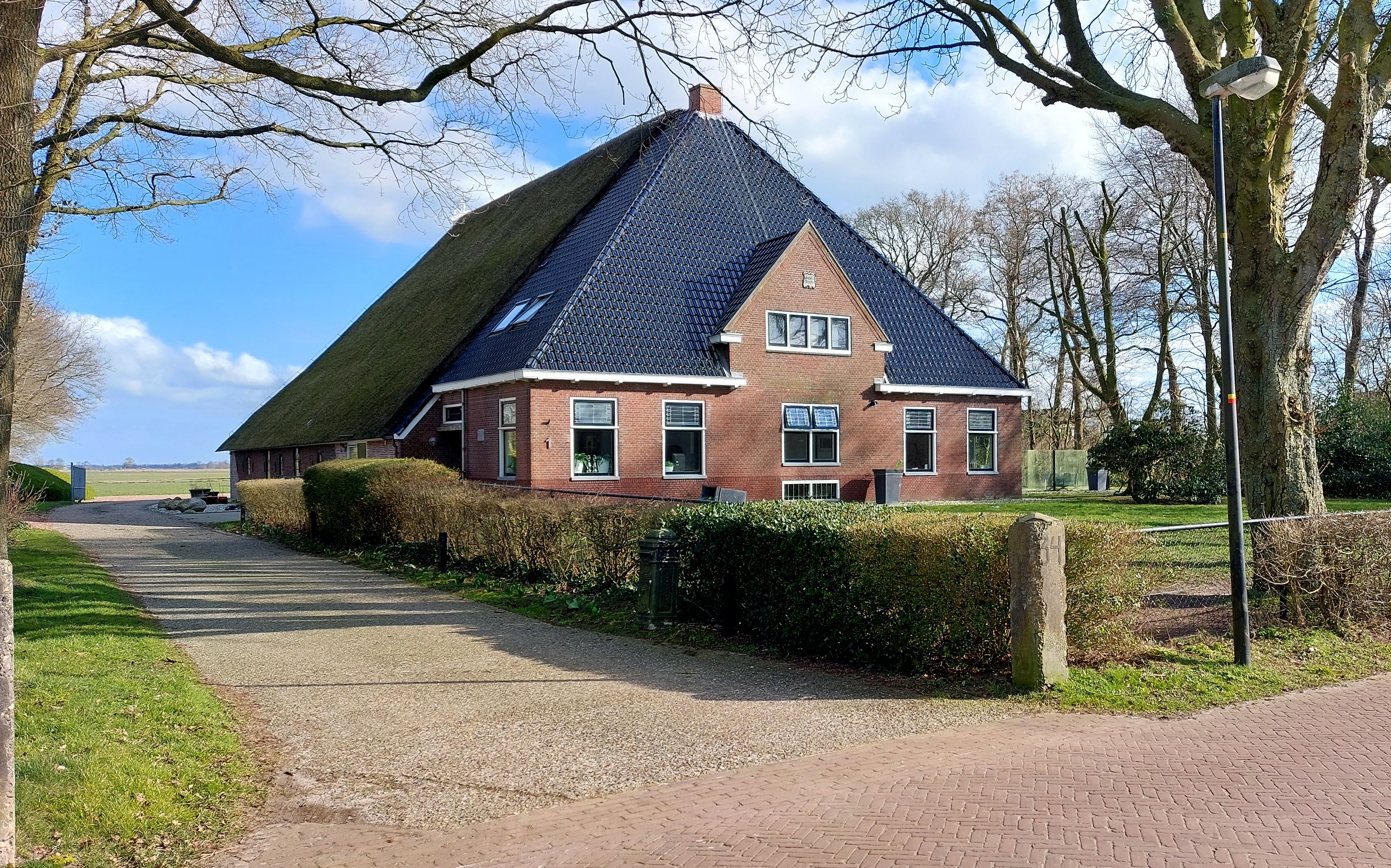
Farm in Mûnein
