= Rauwerda =

Rauwerda is a surname. Notable people with the surname include:

- Annie Rauwerda (born 1999), American internet personality and founder of Depths of Wikipedia
- Jacoba Rauwerda (1835–1919), Dutch brothel manager
- Jurjentje Aukes Rauwerda (1812–1877), Dutch prostitute
