= Protestant church of Aldtsjerk =

Church in Aldtsjerk, Netherlands

Protestant church of Aldtsjerk Saint Paul’s church
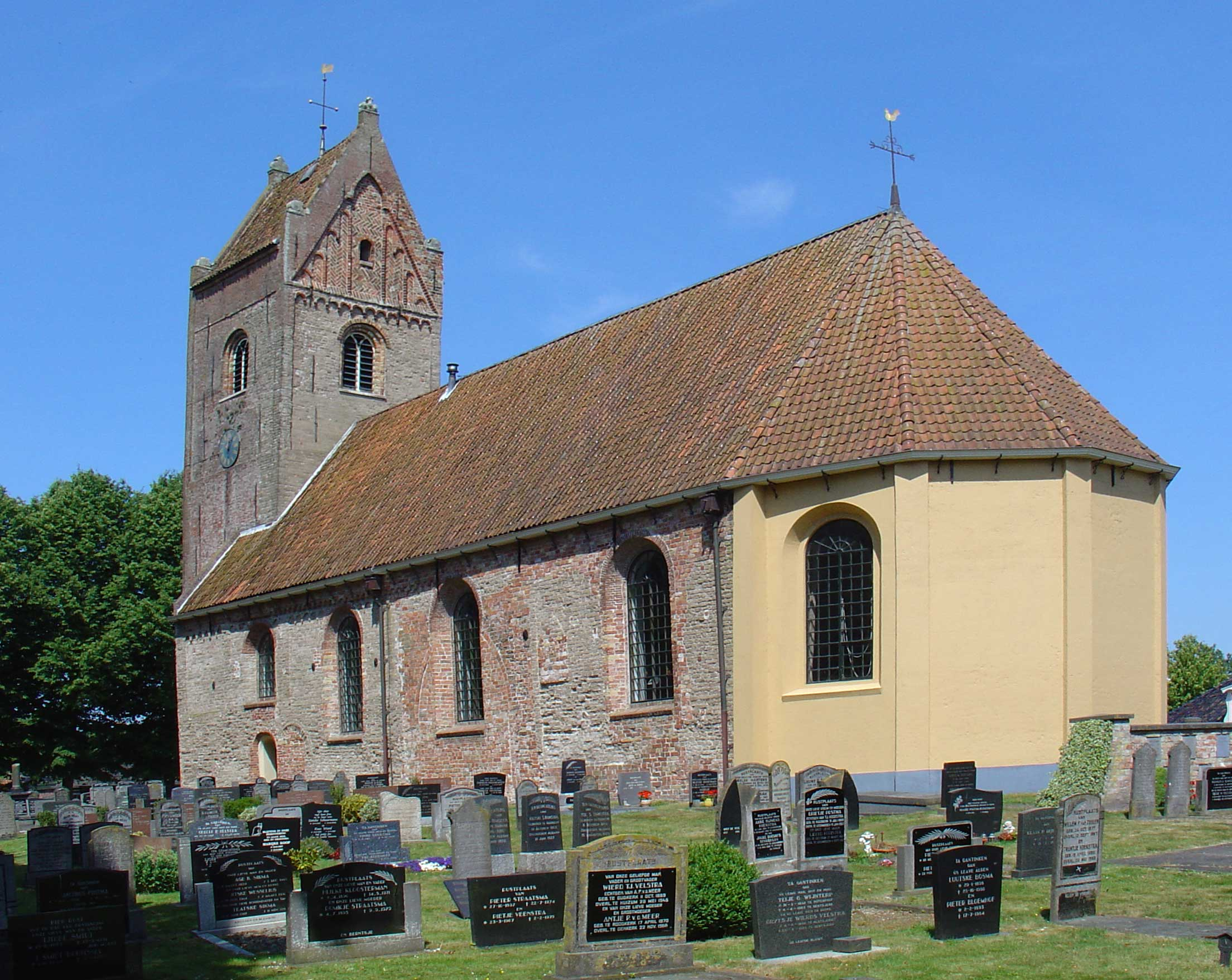
- Church of Aldtsjerk
- Protestant church of Aldtsjerk; Saint Paul’s church
- 53.2647°N 5.8887°E

History
- Dedication: before the Reformation Saint Paul

The Protestant church of Aldtsjerk or Saint Paul's church is a religious building in Aldtsjerk, Netherlands, one of the numerous medieval churches in Friesland.

It is a mid 12th century Romanesque church with a triple closed choir built out of brick covered with tuffstone, located on the Van Sminiawei 29. The tower dates from the 13th century and is like the church build out of brick covered with tuffstone. The church was once a Roman Catholic church dedicated to Saint Paul but became a Protestant church after the Protestant Reformation. Over time the tower and church were several times changed/converted. It is listed as a Rijksmonument, number 35669.
