= Protestant church of Gytsjerk =

Church in Gytsjerk, Netherlands

Protestant church of Gytsjerk Saint Martin’s church
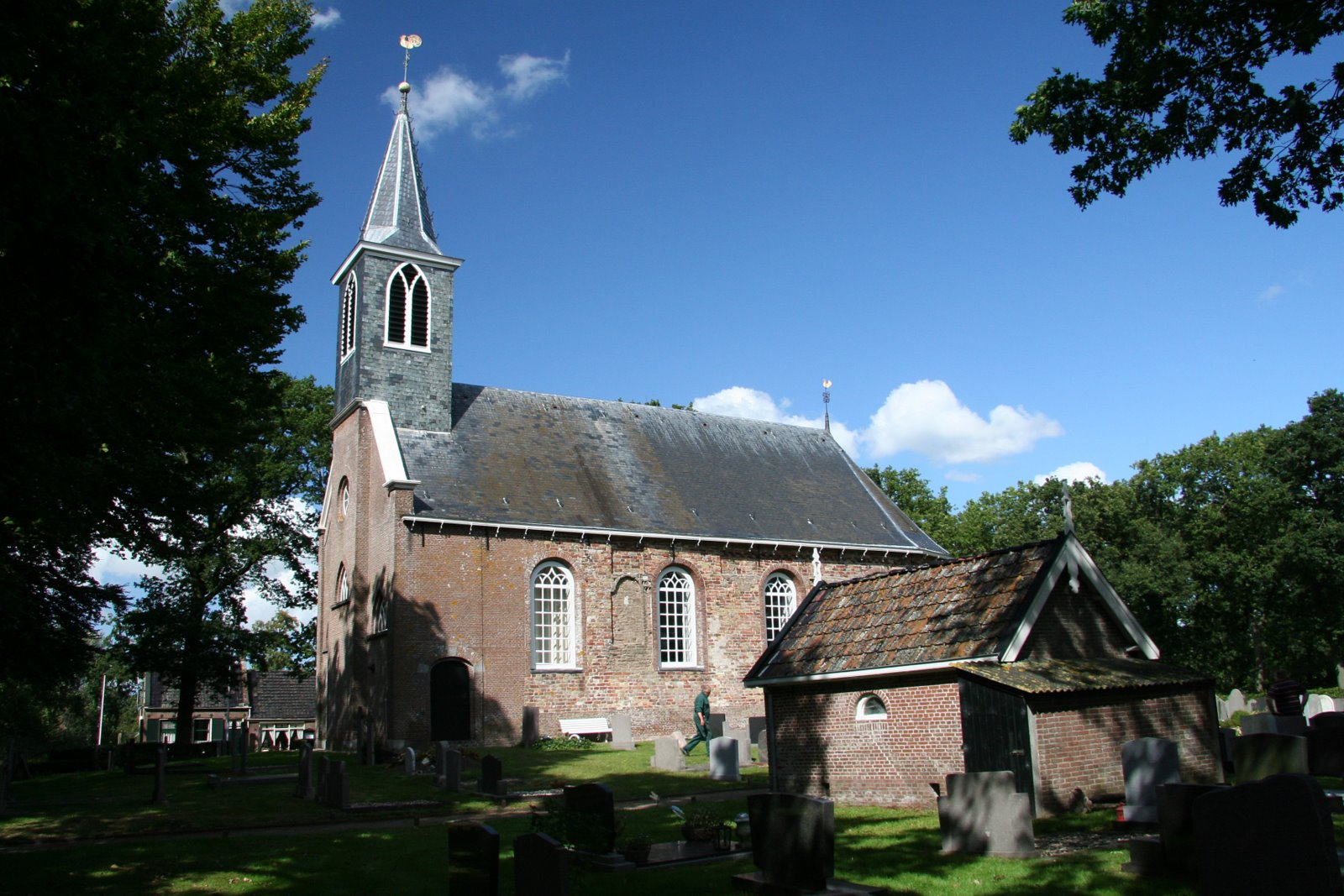
- Church of Gytsjerk
- Protestant church of Gytsjerk; Saint Martin’s church
- 53.2413°N 5.8783°E

History
- Dedication: Before the Reformation, to Saint Martin

The Protestant church of Gytsjerk or Saint Martin's church is a religious building in Gytsjerk, Netherlands, one of the numerous medieval churches in Friesland.

It is a late 12th century Romanesque church with a 19th-century facade. Over time the church was several times changed/converted but the North wall, South wall and choir show still beautiful signs of the Romanesque tuffstone church. The church is located on the Canterlandseweg 63 and was once a Roman Catholic church dedicated to Saint Martin but became a Protestant church after the Protestant Reformation. It is listed as a Rijksmonument, number 35654 and is rated with a very high historical value.
