= Wijnsermolen, Wyns =

Windmill in Wyns, Netherlands

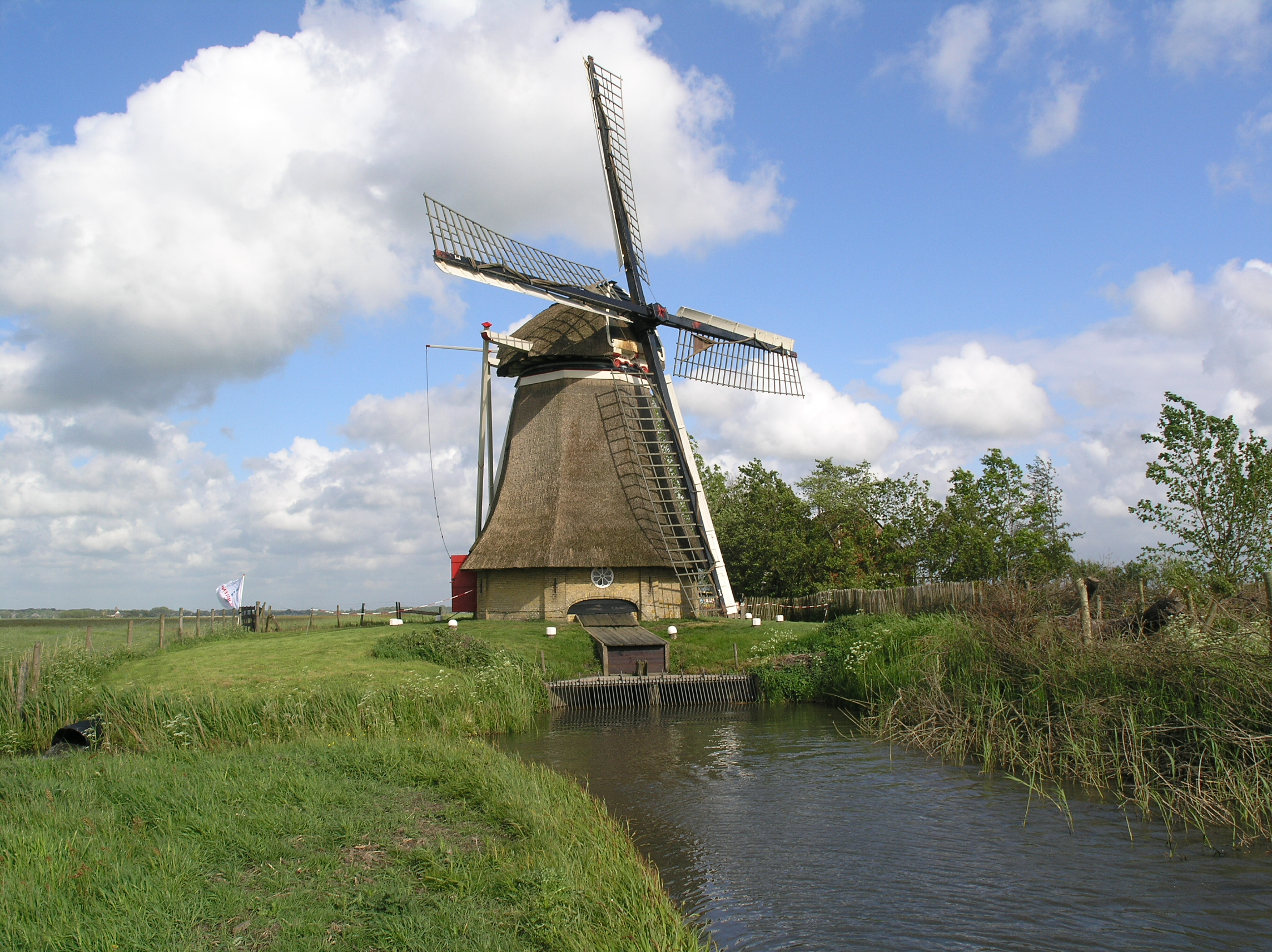
- Wijnsermolen 2007

Origin
- Mill name: Wijnsermolen
- Mill location: In polder Wynserpolder near Wyns
- Coordinates: 53°15′41″N 5°50′43.7″E
- Operator(s): Stichting De Fryske Mole
- Year built: 1871

Information
- Purpose: Drainage mill
- Type: Smock mill
- Storeys: Three-storey smock
- Base storeys: One-storey base
- Smock sides: Eight sides
- No. of sails: Four sails
- Type of sails: Common sails, leading edges on the Fok system
- Windshaft: Cast iron
- Winding: Tailpole and winch
- Type of pump: Archimedes' screw

Wijnsermolen (West Frisian: Wynzermûne) is a smock mill in Wyns, Friesland, Netherlands which is currently (2011) being restored to working order. The mill is listed as a Rijksmonument, number 35691.

== History ==
In 1871 the Wijnserpolder was founded and the mill built replacing several privately owned mills. The millwright was probably Gerben van Wieren from Janum as the mill is very similar to windmill De Victor, Warnswerd built by the same millwright. In 1924 a millers house was built next to the mill which still exists today. The mill was in need of renovation by 1926 and the option of installing an electric pump was considered but this proved too expensive. Instead the mill was modernised in 1932, replacing the patent sails with airfoil shaped dekkerised sails, a steel Archimedes' screw with Dekker roller bearings and a bronze windshaft bearing. These changes improved efficiency but made the mill susceptible to over speeding in blustery winds. When the inner stock had to be replaced in 1957 the Dekker system was removed and a Fok system was fitted. The other stock was fitted with the Fok system sometime later after the steel plates of the airfoil had worn out. This system was also a lot cheaper.

Sierksma was miller until 1967 when he had to stop for health reasons. Difficulties with the housing requirements for a new miller meant that no new miller was hired but two board members of the Wijnserpolder waterboard themselves operated the mill. Until 1975 the polder was drained solely by wind power. In this year the drive wheels and upright shaft were removed and put to one side and a diesel engine from windmill De Hoop, Roodkerk was installed. As a diesel powered pumping station the mill continued to operate until 1984 when its function was taken over by the newly built electric pumping station "De Murk". The windmill slowly fell into disrepair and demolition was considered before it was taken over by Stichting De Fryske Mole and restored in 1995. Since then it is operated by volunteer millers and is designated as a backup pumping station in case of emergencies. During the last restoration of 2010/2011 amongst other work a stock and the screw were replaced.

== Description ==
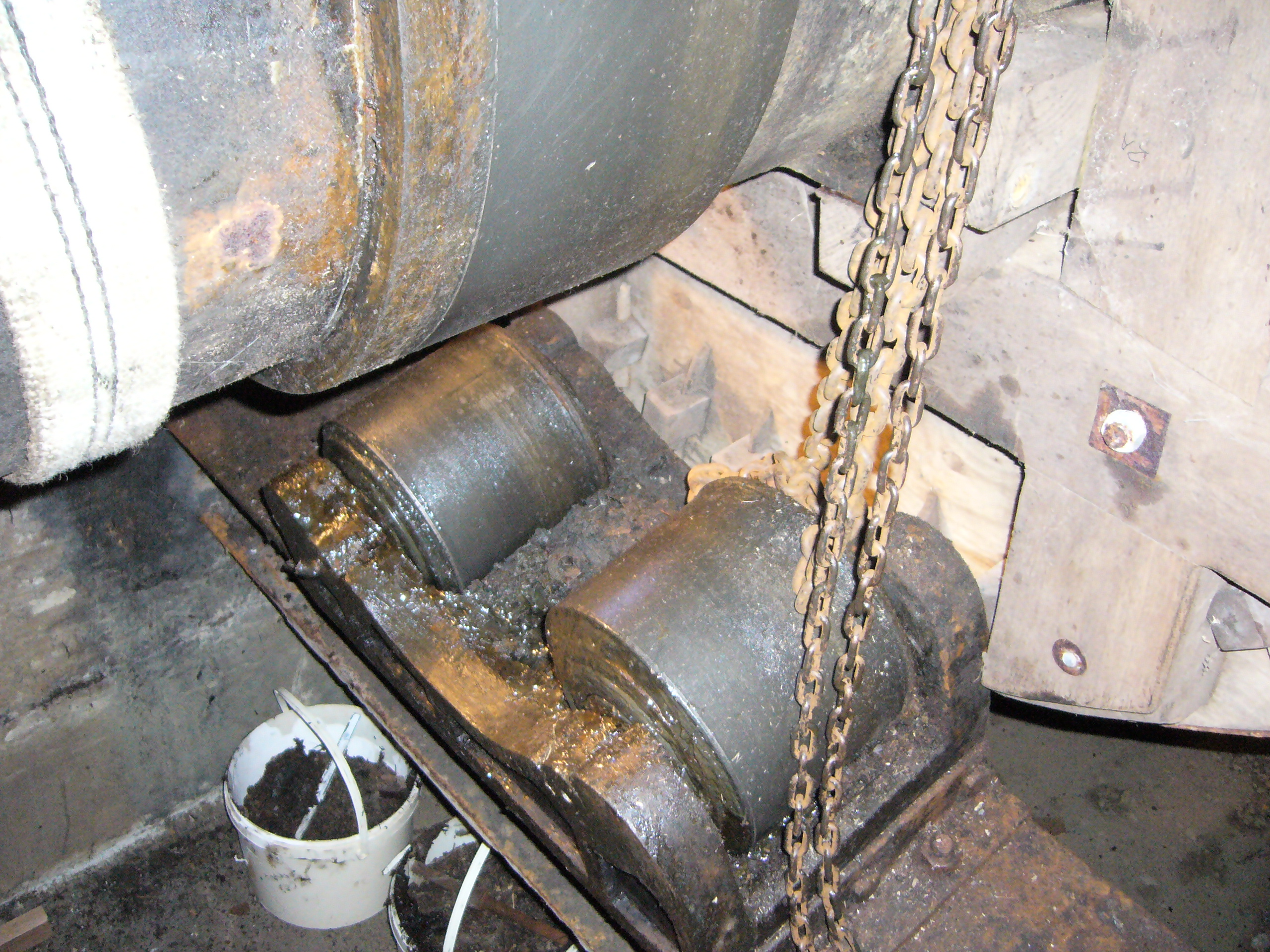
Dekker bearing revealed during the restoration

The Wijnsermolen is what the Dutch describe as an "achtkante grondzeiler". It is a smock mill without a stage, the sails reaching almost to the ground. The brick base is one storey high with a three-storey smock on top. Both smock and cap are thatched. The mill is winded by tailpole and winch. The four common sails with Fok system have a span of 19.50 metres (64 ft 0 in) and are carried on a cast-iron windshaft cast by foundry De Prins van Oranje in 1889 as number 1360. The front bearing is of cast iron with bronze liner instead of the stone bearings that are more commonly found in the Netherlands. The windshaft carries the brake wheel, which has 55 cogs. This drives the wallower (28 cogs) at the top of the upright shaft. At the lower end of the upright shaft the crown wheel (42 cogs) drives the steel Archimedes' screw via a gear wheel with 39 cogs. The upper bearing of the screw axle is a rare Dekker bearing, consisting of two rollers that support the axle. The Archimedes' screw diameter is 1.05 metres (3 ft 5 in) diameter. It is inclined at 16½°. Each revolution of the Archimedes' screw can lift 956 litres (210 imp gal) of water.

== Public access ==
The mill is open to the public by appointment.
