= Jurjentje Aukes Rauwerda =

Dutch prostitute and madam (1812–1877)

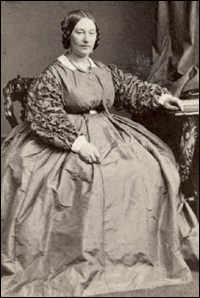
- Jurjentje Aukes Rauwerda
- Born: 14 December 1812; Oentsjerk, the Netherlands
- Died: 3 October 1877 (aged 64); Amsterdam, Netherlands
- Other name: Jurrentje Weinthal
- Occupations: Prostitute; brothel madam
- Spouse: Benjamin Salomon Weinthal (1804–1855) m. 1843
- Children: Jacoba Rauwerda (1835–1919); Johan Rauwerda (1837–1838); Heiman Rauwerda (1839–1840); Bernard Weinthal (1844–?)
- Parents: Auke Klases Rauwerda (1777–1858) (father); Blijke Jurjens Uitterdijk (1775–1851) (mother)

Jurjentje Aukes Rauwerda (14 December 1812, in Oentsjerk – 3 October 1877, Amsterdam), later Jurrentje Weinthal, was a Dutch prostitute and procurer. She was famous among members of her profession in the contemporary Netherlands, and ran the largest brothel in Amsterdam, the Maison Weinthal.

== Biography ==
Jurjentje Rauwerda was the daughter of carpenter Auke Klases Rauwerda (1777–1858) and Blijke Jurjens Uitterdijk (1775–1851). On 3 October 1835 she gave birth to a daughter, Jacoba Frederika, who was reputed to be the daughter of Parisian porcelain manufacturer Monsieur Lejeune. By 1837 she was living in Leeuwarden, and gave birth to a son, Johan Frederik, who died a year later. In the Leeuwarden census of 1839 Rauwerda was not registered, but her daughter Jacoba Frederika was noted as living with Jurjentje's parents. Later the same year she gave birth to a second son, Heiman, who died five months later. A third son, Willem, was born on 31 July 1842. Willem was rumoured to have been the child of William III of the Netherlands.

In 1843, she was officially registered as a seamstress in Leeuwarden, living with her two surviving children in Speelmansstraat, in the Jewish part of the city. In May that year she moved to the adjacent Zuupsteeg. On November 2, 1843, she married Benjamin Salomon Weinthal (1804–1855). Their son, Bernard, was born in 1844. In 1847 they moved to Groningen.

=== Maison Weinthal ===
Benjamin Weinthal founded the brothel, Maison Weinthal, in 1827 at Pijpenmarkt (now Nieuwezijds Voorburgwal), Amersterdam, in the building later numbered as 229 Voorburgwal. The brothel was a short walking distance from the Royal Palace. It was run by various madams until around 1850.

Around 1850 the adjacent buildings were purchased and the brothel extended into them. The brothel was now from 227 - 229 Voorburgwal. The revamped establishment now boasted a winter garden, a large salon where the women could meet clients and luxuriously appointed 'work rooms'. Behind the scenes there were dormitories to the women, who all lived-in.

By 1852 Jurjentje was running the brothel. In the Staat van Huizen van Ontucht (State of Houses of Fornication), drawn up by the Amsterdam Police in that year, Jurjentje was listed the brothel owner and there were 6 women listed as working there. The following year Benjamin brought a house called Vredenwensch in Franschelaan, located in the Plantage district. Jurjentje and the three children continued to live at the brothel. By this time there were 15 women working there from the Netherlands, Germany and France

Benjamin died in 1855. In his will he left Jurjentje's children Jacoba and Willem 2,500 guilders each. The rest of the estate was left to Jurjentje and Bernard. In January 1856 the house in Franschelaan was sold and an inventory of Benjamin's estate was drawn up. Within a safe 4600 guilders in cash and gold and silver jewellery was found. During this time Benjamin's daughter from a previous relationship, Lisette Weinthal, appeared and make a claim on the estate. On 31 July that year an agreement was made and the estate divided.

Jurjentje continued to run the brothel with the assistance of her daughter Jacoba. In 1860 Bernard died. The brothel was exclusive and successful and between 1864 and 1875, 225 women worked there. In 1877 Jurjentje died and Jacoba continued to run the brothel until its closure in 1902.
