= Aldtsjerk =

Oudkerk Aldtsjerk
- Village
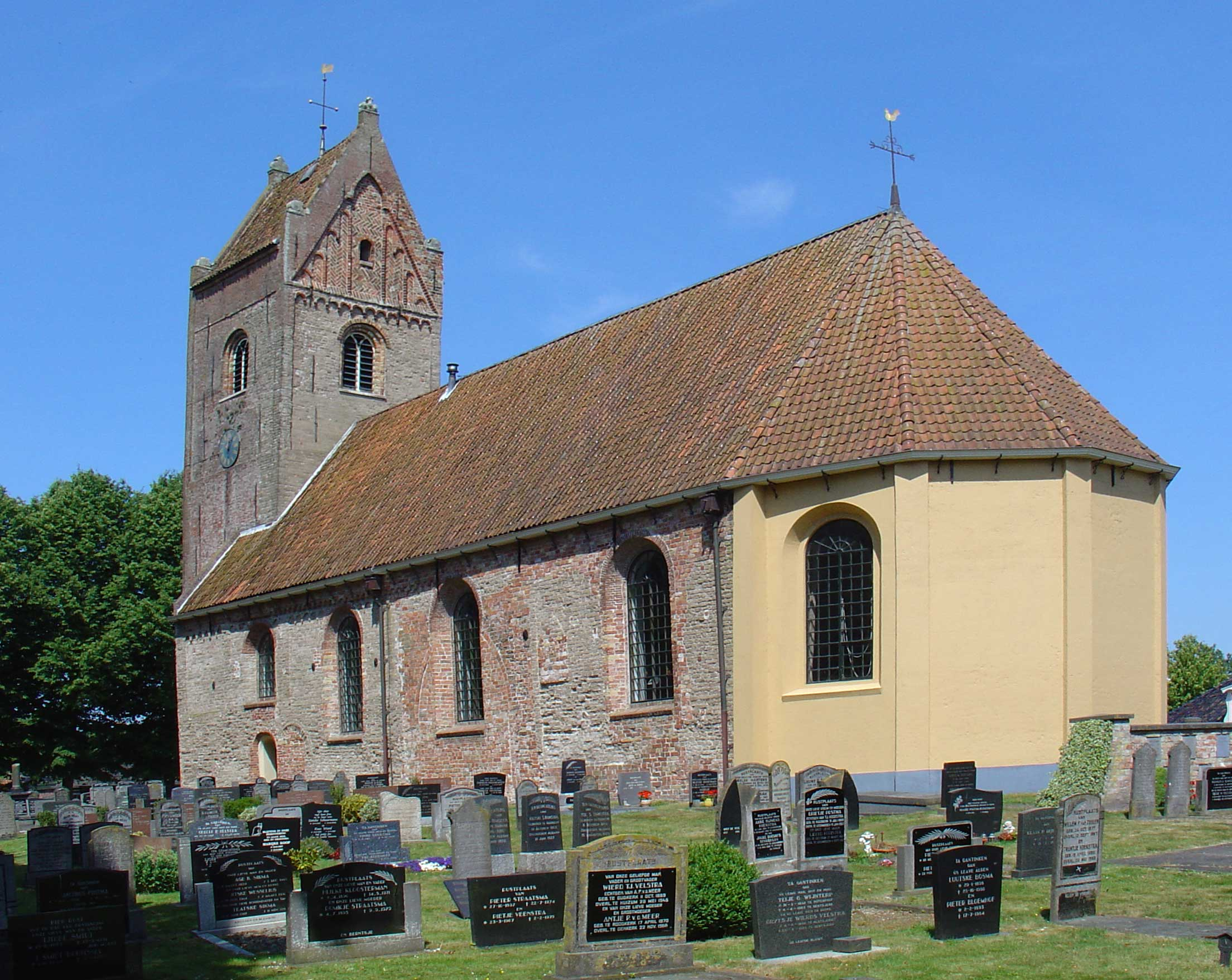
- St Paul's Church

- Flag Coat of arms

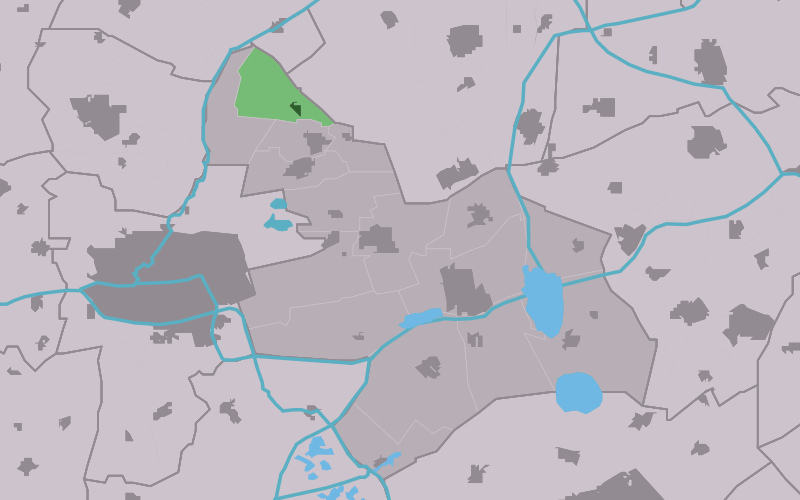
- Location of the village in Tytsjerksteradiel

- Location in the Netherlands Oudkerk (Netherlands)
- Country: Netherlands
- Province: Friesland
- Municipality: Tytsjerksteradiel

Area
  - Total: 7.08 km^{2} (2.73 sq mi)
- Elevation: 0.1 m (0.33 ft)

Population (2021)
  - Total: 640
  - Density: 90/km^{2} (230/sq mi)
- Time zone: UTC+1 (CET)
  - Summer (DST): UTC+2 (CEST)
- Postal code: 9064
- Dialing code: 058
- Website: Official

Aldtsjerk (Dutch: Oudkerk) is a village on the main road from Leeuwarden to Dokkum. It is part of Tytsjerksteradiel municipality, Friesland, the Netherlands and had around 615 inhabitants as of January 2018.

Its annual festivities include the Doarpsfeest, including a parade, held in the summer. Local landmarks include the Heemstra State, former residence of the aristocratic Sminia family. The village's main road, the van Sminiaweg is about 1.5 km long and named after the Sminia family. The village also houses a former baker who was quite famous for his Oranjekoek and Suikerbrood, but who retired in 2000 when the euro was introduced. Local shopping facilities are scarce: the nearest grocery market is located in Oentsjerk, about three kilometers outside town limits. The most notable shop of the town is a bike dealership and a store called Bram en Jannie's, which stands not actually in the village itself, but halfway between Aldtjserk and Oentsjerk. In the center of the village is located the Aldtsjerk church, which was built in 12th century and gives the village its name ("Old Church").

Near the village is the Aldtsjerkster mar, a small lake which is an important point on the Elfstedentocht. In Dutch, the village is called Oudkerk ("Old Church"); Aldtsjerk is its West Frisian name. It was one of the first Frisian towns to be generally listed under its West Frisian, rather than its Dutch name. The Ouderkerkermolen is a preserved windmill in Aldtsjerk.

== Notable buildings ==
- The Protestant church of Aldtsjerk
- The Ouderkerkermolen

== Gallery ==
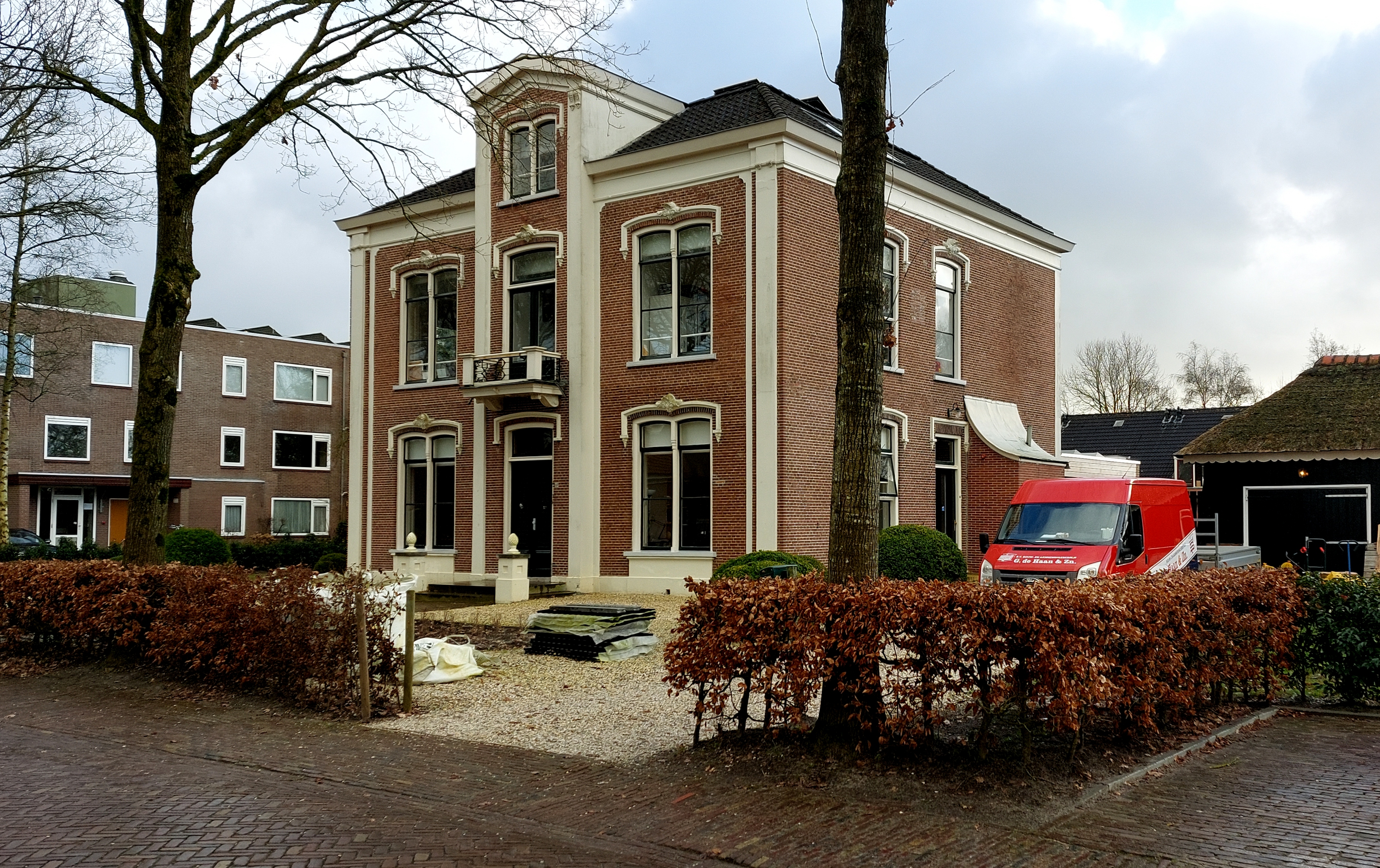
Former clergy house

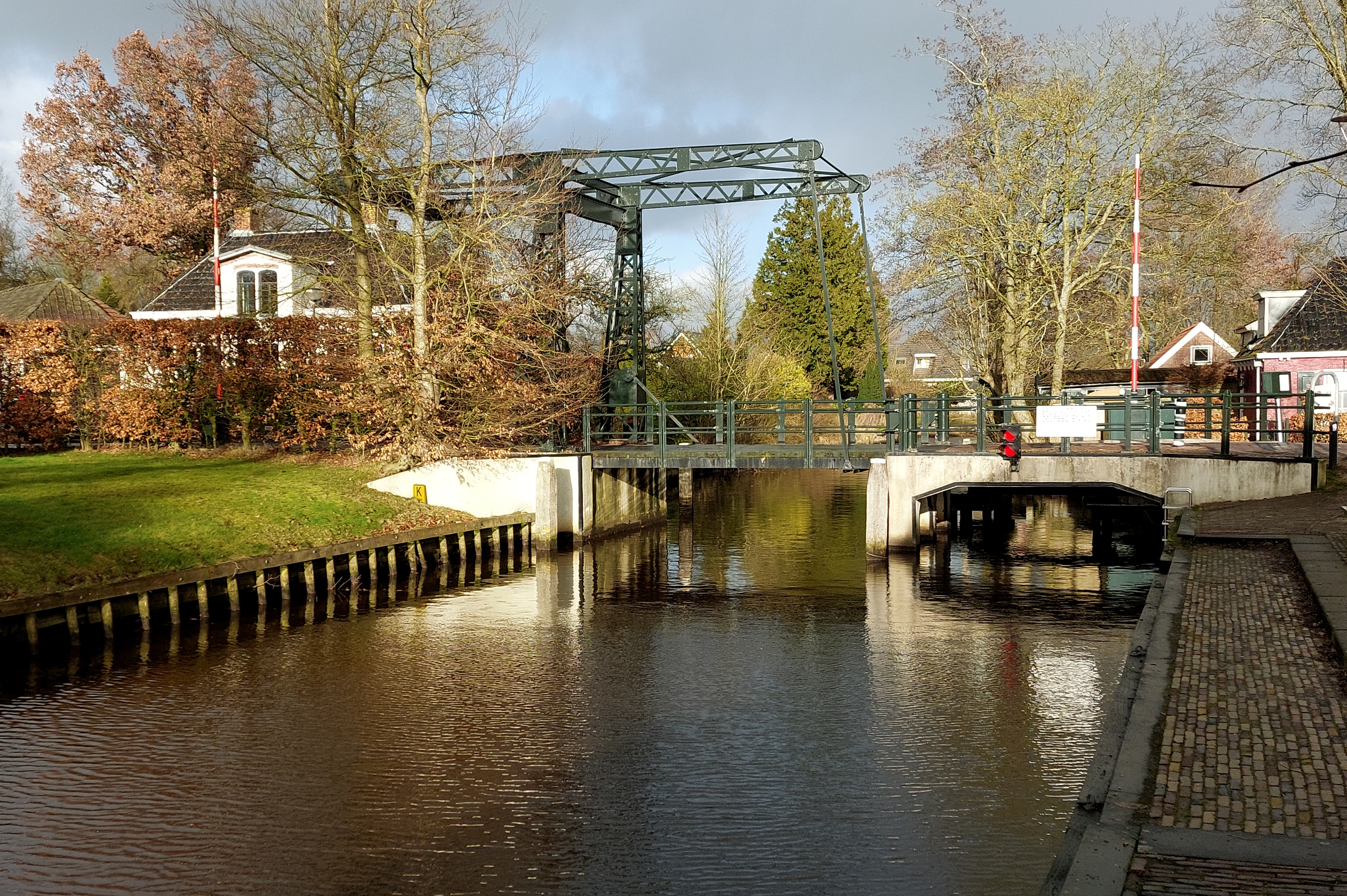
Draw bridge

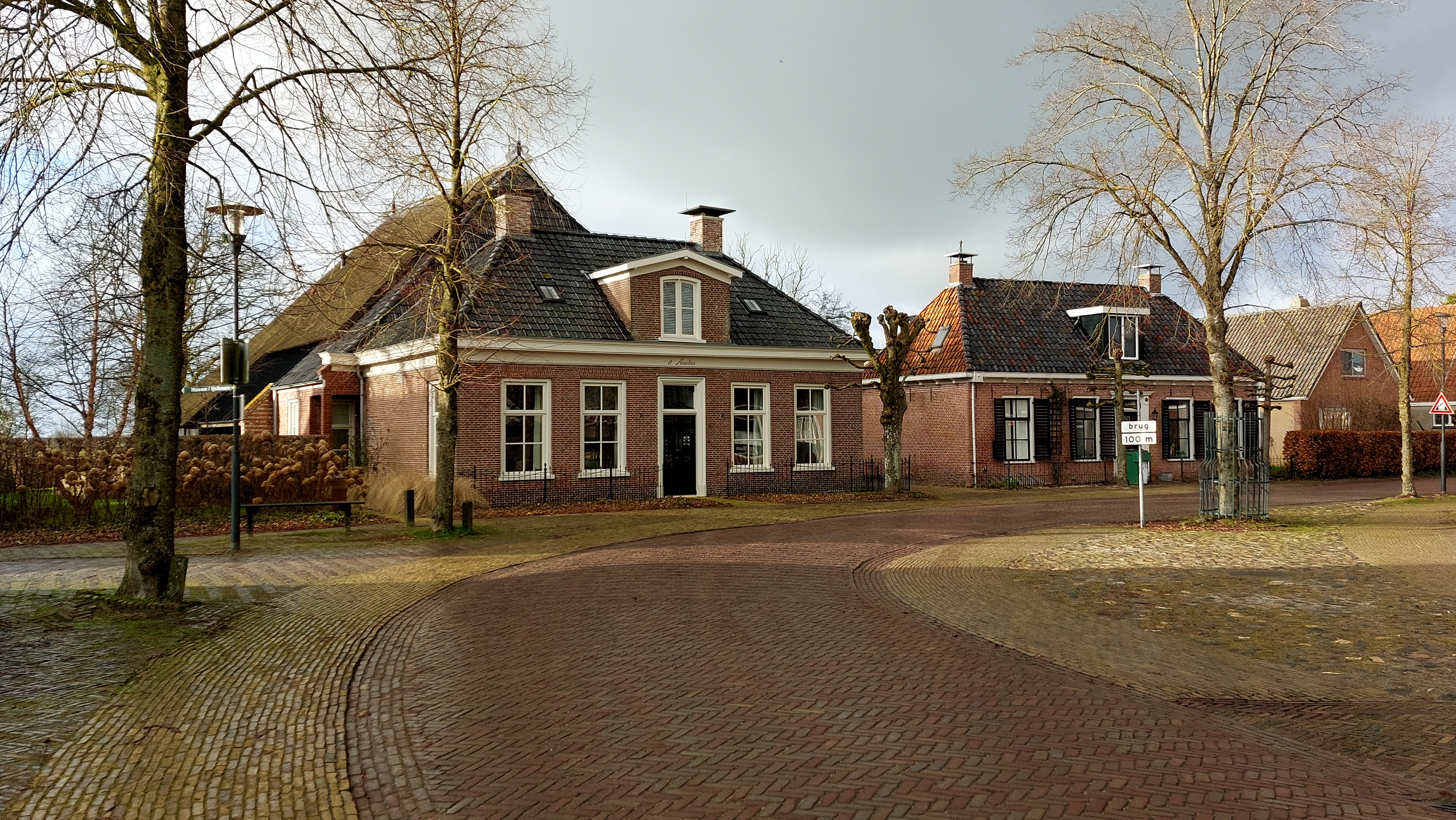
Village square

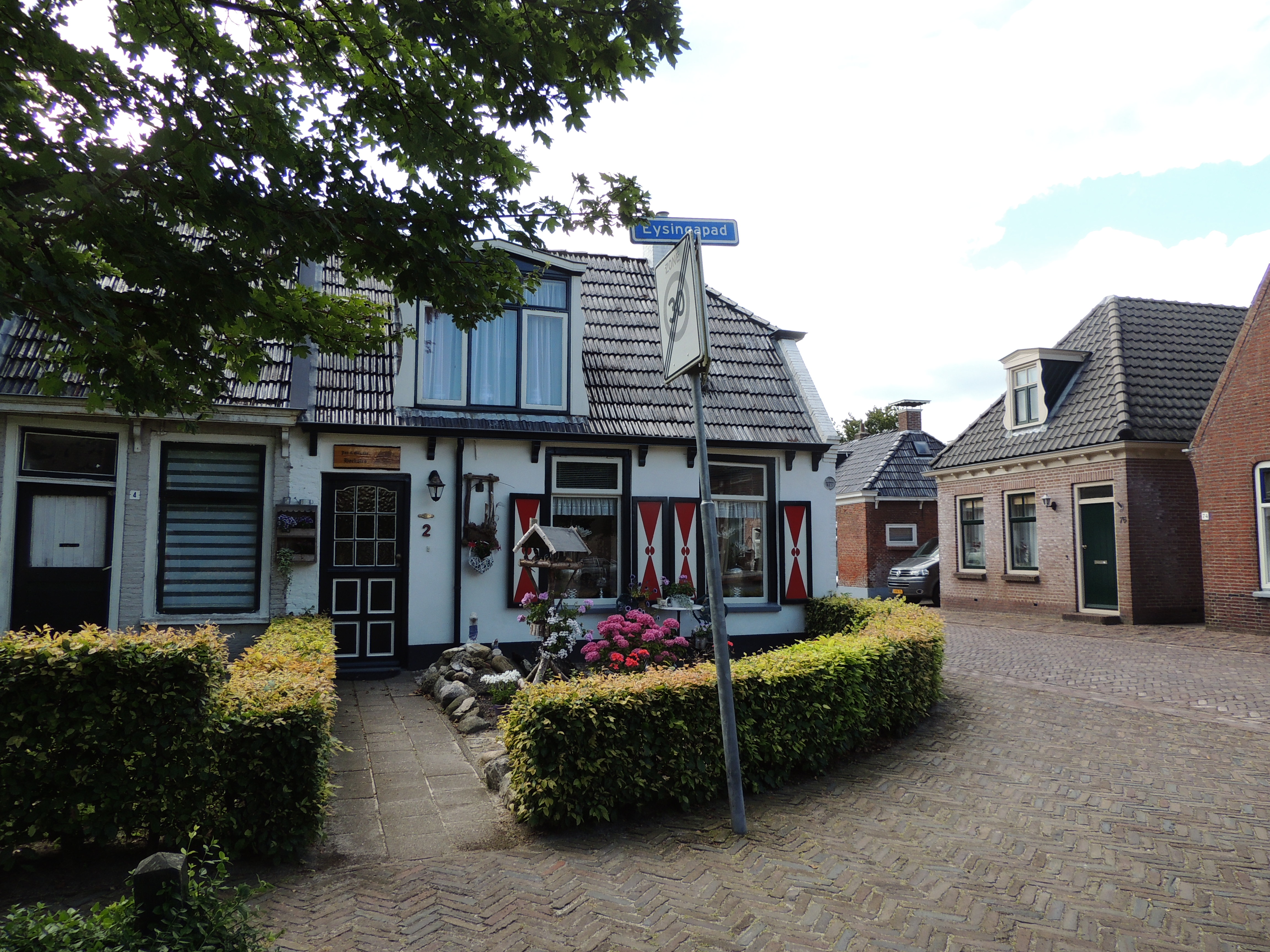
Houses in Aldtsjerk
