= De Hoop, Readtsjerk =

Smock mill in Friesland, Netherlands

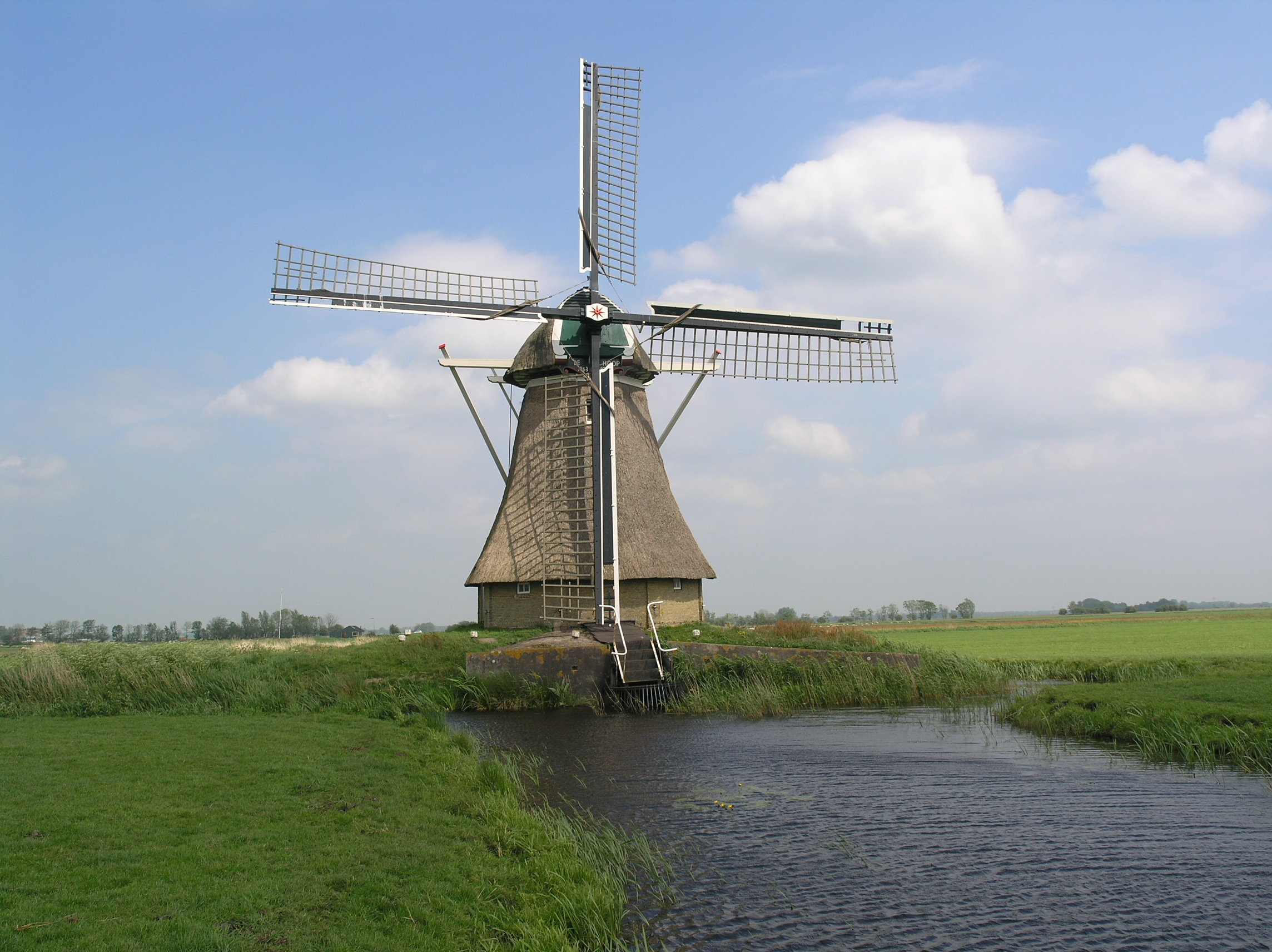
- De Hoop, May 2007.

Origin
- Mill name: De Hoop
- Mill location: Near Reidfjildswei, Readtsjerk
- Coordinates: 53°15′59″N 5°55′49″E
- Operator(s): Stichting De Fryske Mole
- Year built: 1911

Information
- Purpose: Drainage mill
- Type: Smock mill
- Storeys: Two storey smock
- Base storeys: One storey base
- Smock sides: Eight sides
- No. of sails: Four sails
- Type of sails: Common sails
- Windshaft: Cast iron
- Winding: Tailpole and winch
- Auxiliary power: Diesel engine
- Type of pump: Archimedes screw

De Hoop (English: The Hope) is a smock mill in Readtsjerk, Friesland, Netherlands which was built in 1911. The mill has been restored to working order. It is listed as a Rijksmonument.

== History ==
De Hoop was originally built in 1863 at Scharmer, Groningen. The mill was moved 2 kilometres (1.2 mi) in 1895 and was moved to Readtsjerk in 1911, replacing an earlier mill on the site. In 1961, the mill was mechanised, with a new steel Archimedes' screw replacing the former wooden one. A diesel engine was installed. The engine was later removed and installed in the Wijnsermolen, Wyns. The mill was fitted with Patent sails, which were replaced by Common Sails in 1969. De Hoop was sold to Stichting De Fryske Mole on 17 May 1972, the 3rd mill acquired by that organisation The mill is used to train people in the art of working windmills. In September 2010, the mill required repairs to its foundations. These required the temporary removal of the Archimedes' screw. The mill is listed as a Rijksmonument, №11697.

== Description ==
De Hoop is what the Dutch describe as a Grondzeiler. It is a two-storey smock mill on a single storey base. There is no stage, the sails reaching almost to ground level. The mill is winded by tailpole and winch. The smock and cap are thatched. The sails are Common sails. They have a span of 20.50 metres (67 ft 3 in).The sails are carried on a cast iron windshaft, which was probably cast by H J Koning of Foxham, Groningen in 1991.. It also carries the brake wheel which has 59 cogs. This drives the wallower (30 cogs) at the top of the upright shaft. At the bottom of the upright shaft there are two crown wheels The upper crown wheel, which has 43 cogs drives an Archimedes' screw via a crown wheel. The lower crown wheel, which has 38 cogs is carried on the axle of an Archimedes' screw, which is used to drain the polder. The axle of the screw is 61 centimetres (2 ft 0 in) diameter and 5.80 metres (19 ft 0 in) long. The screw is 1.34 metres (4 ft 5 in) diameter. It is inclined at 15.5°. Each revolution of the screw lifts 844 litres (186 imp gal) of water.

== Public access ==
De Hoop is open to the public by appointment.
