= Protestant church of Oentsjerk =

Church in Oentsjerk, Netherlands

Protestant church of Oentsjerk Saint Mary church
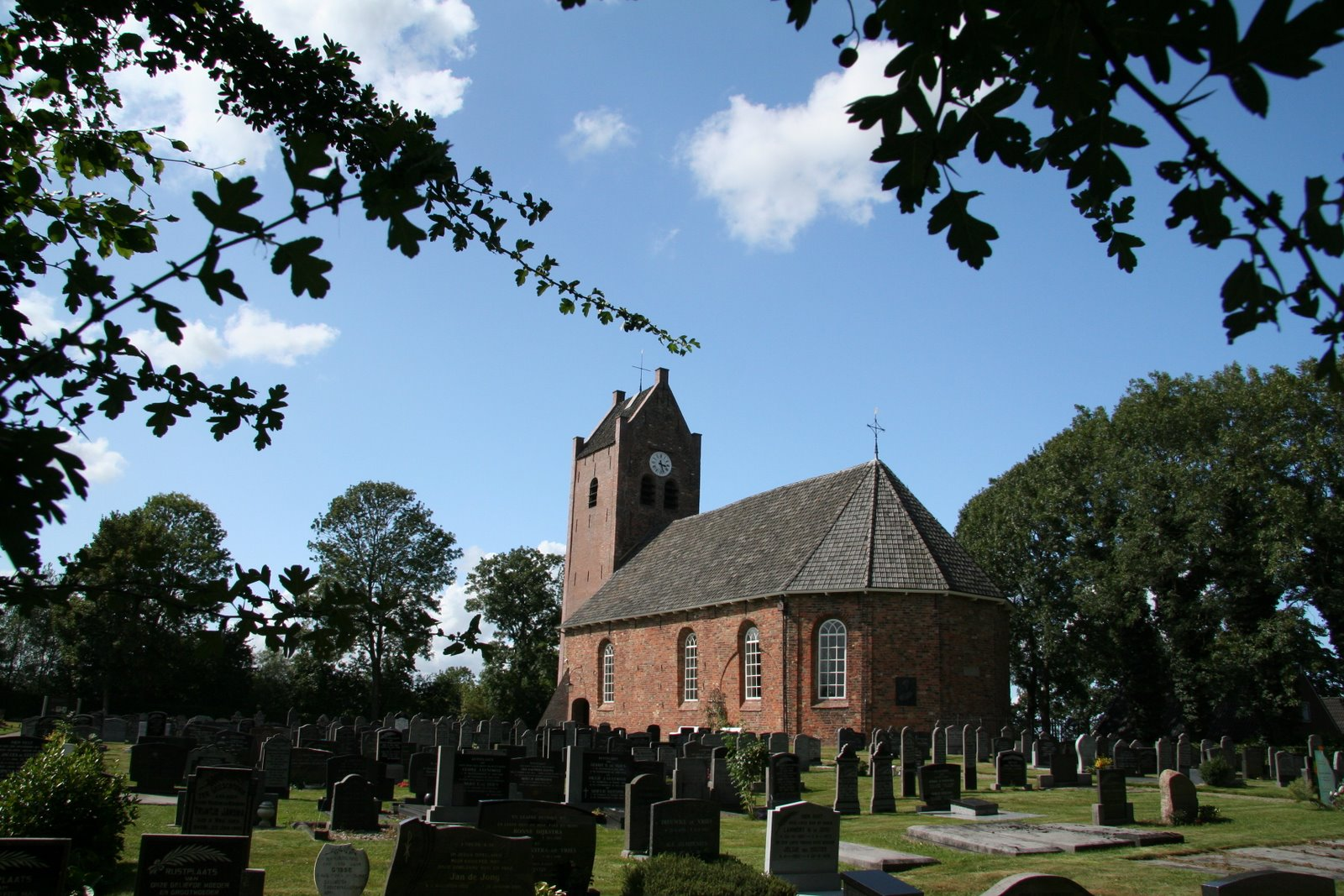
- Church of Oentsjerk
- Protestant church of Oentsjerk; Saint Mary church
- 53.2538°N 5.892°E

History
- Dedication: Before the Reformation, to Saint Mary

Specifications
- Materials: Brick

Administration
- Archdeaconry: stress v

The Protestant church of Oentsjerk or Saint Mary church is a medieval religious building in Oentsjerk, Friesland, Netherlands.

The church was built c. 1230 out of red brick and has a tower from the 14th century. On the West gallery is a monumental Pipe organ, built in 1871 by P. van Oeckelen The church was originally a Roman Catholic church dedicated to Saint Mary but became a Protestant church after the Protestant Reformation. It is listed as a Rijksmonument, number 35658. The building is located on the Wijnserdijk 9.
