= De Ouderkerkermolen, Aldtsjerk =

Smock mill in the Netherlands

Oudkerkemolen, Aldtsjerk
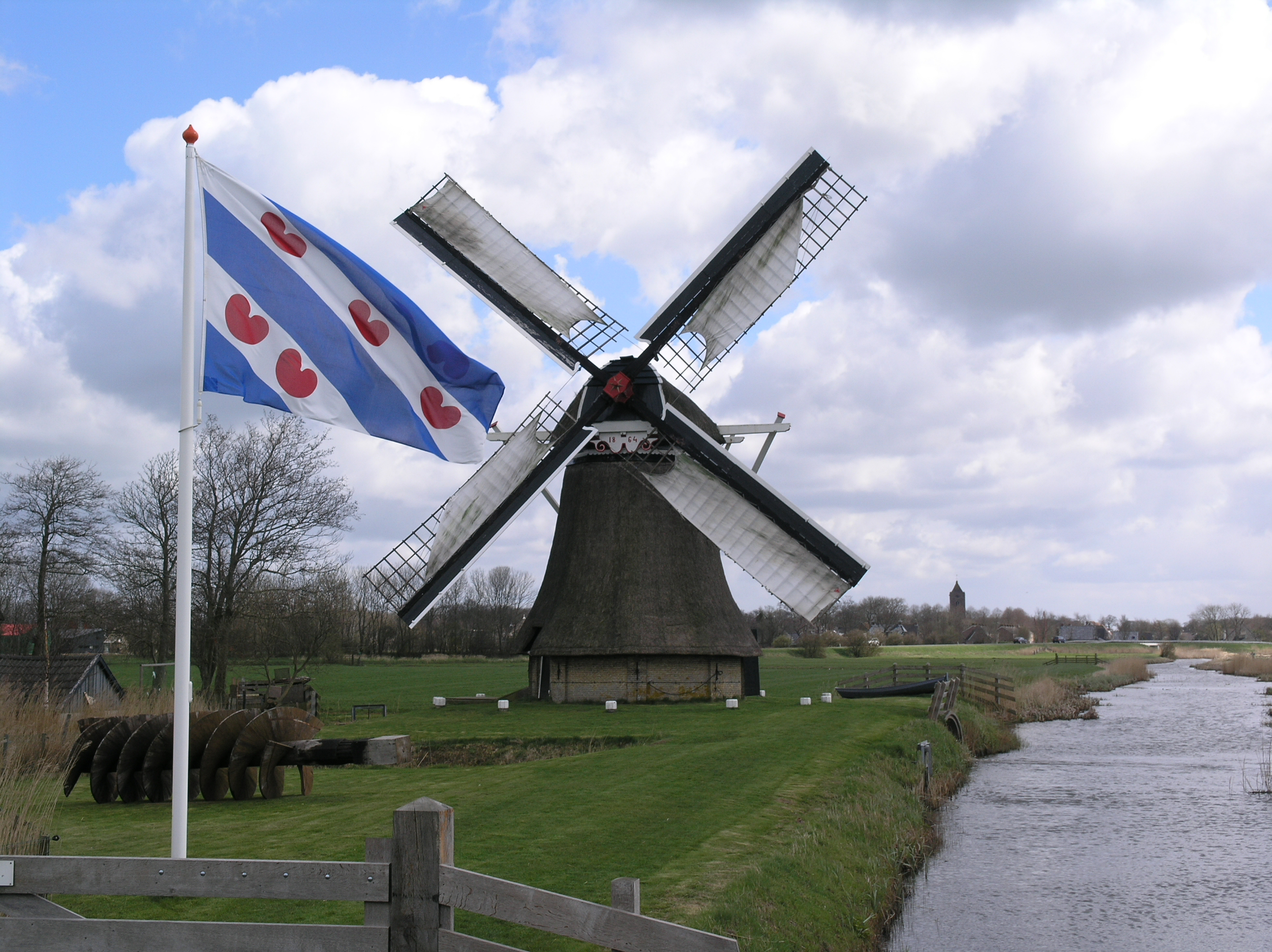
- De Ouderkerkermolen, April 2005

Origin
- Mill name: De Oudkerkermolen; Oudkerkemolen
- Mill location: Rhaladyk 19, 9064 DD, Aldtsjerk
- Coordinates: 53°15′55″N 5°52′38″E
- Operator(s): Stichting Waterschaps Erfgoed
- Year built: 1864

Information
- Purpose: Drainage mill
- Type: Smock mill
- Storeys: Single-storey base
- Base storeys: Three-storey smock
- Smock sides: Eight sides
- No. of sails: Four sails
- Type of sails: Common sails
- Windshaft: Cast iron
- Winding: Tailpole and winch
- Auxiliary power: Diesel engine
- Type of pump: Archimedes' screw

De Oudkerkermolen, or Oudkerkemolen (English: Old Church Mill) is a smock mill in Aldtsjerk, Friesland, Netherlands which has been restored to working order. The mill is listed as a Rijksmonument, number 35674.

== History ==
De Oudkerkermolen was built in 1864. On 13 March 1955 it was badly damaged in a storm. Repairs cost ƒ6,734, including new sails at ƒ3,200 and a new Archimedes' screw at ƒ1,950. The repairs were carried out by millwright De Roos of Leeuwarden. Further repairs were made to the mill in 1963.

The mill drained the 160 hectares (400 acres) Oudkerkerpolder until 1970. A diesel engine formerly provided auxiliary power. It was restored in 1975. Although in working order, the mill just pumps water in a circuit to demonstrate the process.

== Description ==
De Oudkerkermolen is a smock mill whose sails almost reach the ground. The mill has a single-storey brick base. The smock and cap are thatched. The mill is winded by a tailpole and winch. The four Common sails, which have a span of 15.68 metres (51 ft 5 in), are carried on a cast-iron windshaft. This was made by millwright H J Koning of Foxham in 1910. The windshaft also carries the brake wheel which has 50 cogs. This drives the wallower (29 cogs) at the top of the upright shaft. At the lower end of the upright shaft the crown wheel (37 cogs) drives the wooden Archimedes' screw via a gear wheel with 34 cogs. The Archimedes' screw has an axle diameter of 320 millimetres (1 ft 1 in) and is 1.24 metres (4 ft 1 in) diameter overall. It is inclined at 19½°. Each turn of the screw lifts 537 litres (118 imp gal) of water.

== Public access ==
De Oudkerkermolen is open to the public by appointment only.
