= Readtsjerk =

Readtsjerk Roodkerk
- Village
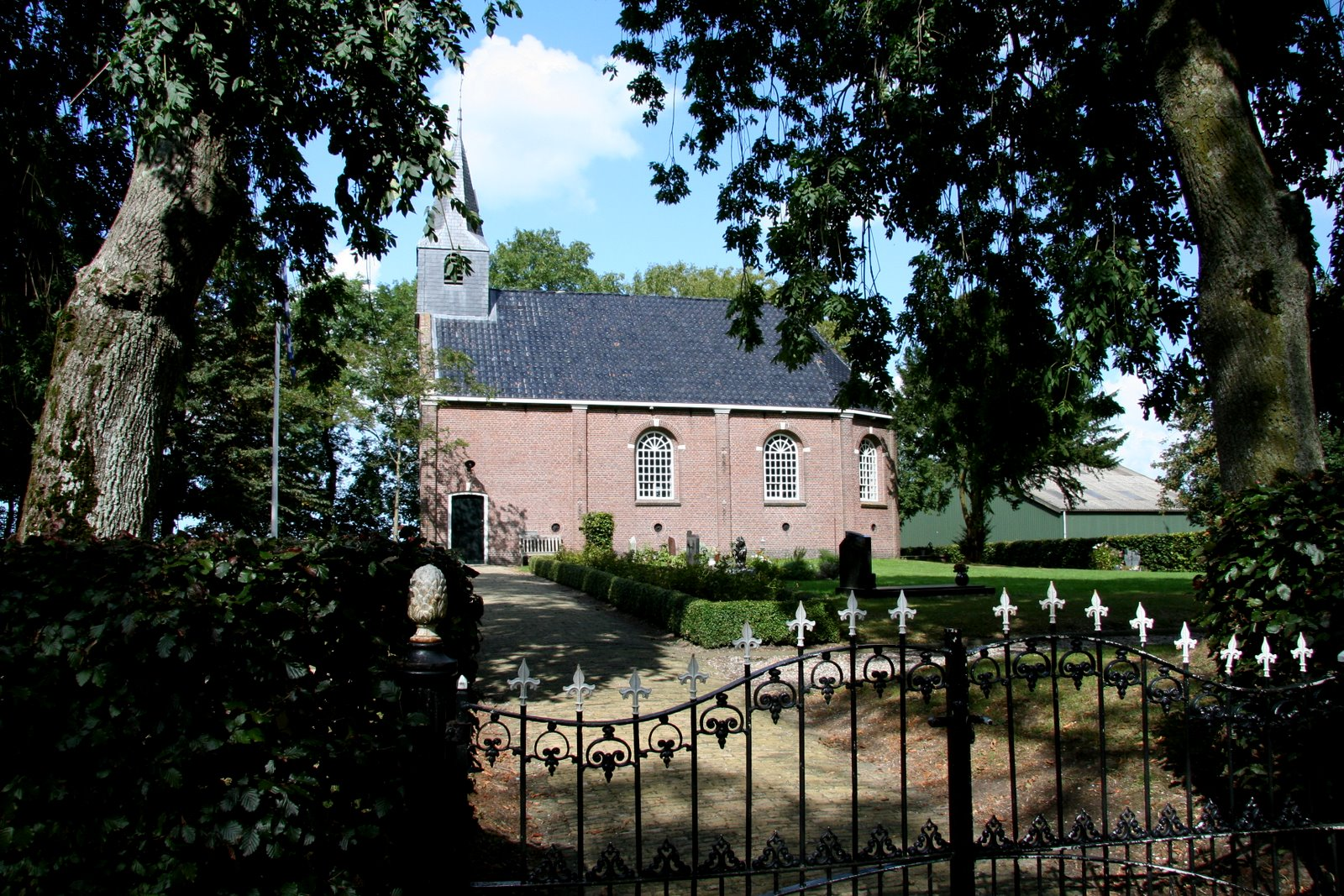
- Church Readtsjerkje

- Coat of arms

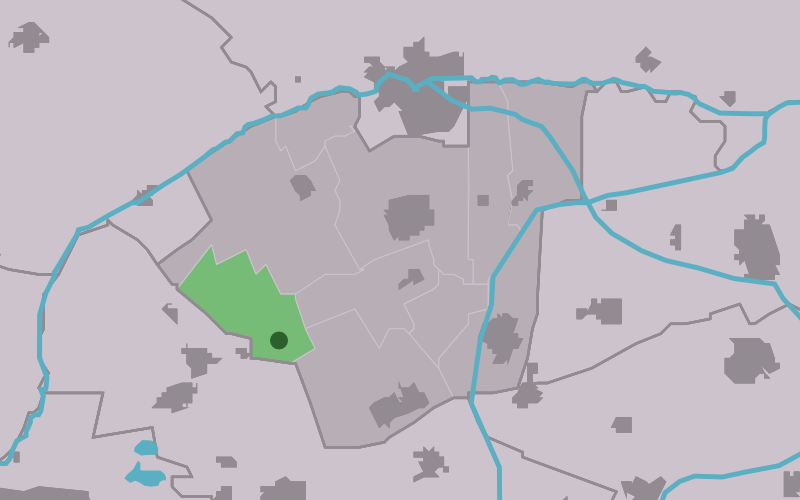
- Location in Dantumadiel municipality

- Location in the Netherlands Readtsjerk (Netherlands)
- Country: Netherlands
- Province: Friesland
- Municipality: Dantumadiel

Population (2017)
  - Total: 185
- Time zone: UTC+1 (CET)
  - Summer (DST): UTC+2 (CEST)
- Website: Official

Readtsjerk (Dutch: Roodkerk) is a village in the Dantumadiel municipality of Friesland, the Netherlands. It had a population of around 185 in 2017.

The village consists of a few small and sparsely populated neighborhoods and has no real residential center. Together with the almost similar village Mûnein it forms a kind of twin village, under the name Mûnein-Readtsjerk . North to northeast of the village lies a restored windmill called De Hoop.

== History ==
Probably at the beginning of the 12th century, a church was built on the edge of the Trynwâlden, a sand ridge. This church, called the Readtsjerkje, was a towerless church built of tuff. These had a red colour and that is probably the reason of the place name is named after the red coulerd church. In 1421 the place was mentioned as Rada tzerka, 'rada' in Old Frisian denotes the colour red and 'tzerka' church. In 1499 it was mentioned as rada tzercka, in 1508 as radetzercka, in 1511 as Rodekercke, Rodenkercke and Rodertzercka.

By the time it was called Roodkerck in 1664, the small residential center of the village had come to lie around the Siccama State, northwest of the church. This stately home was first mentioned at the end of the 15th century. The state itself was demolished around 1860.

Even further northwest there was the hamlet of (De) Weerburen and the subsequent neighborhoods Healbird and Syewier, the latter from around the De Seijewier farm on banks of the water De Moark. Healbird was a country house. Until the beginning of the 20th century De Weerburen was still seen as its own hamlet. But because the village of Readtsjerk itself consists of several separate little neighborhoods, which also increased little bit in the 20th century, it was eventually seen as part of the village itself.

From 1786 the Dutch spelling Roodkerk was used quite standard, until 2009 it was also the official name of the village. In modern West Frisian it is Readtsjerk. In 2008 the municipality Dantumadiel decided that it was going the replace all the official Dutch names within the municipality with the West Frisian names, meaning that Readtsjerk was from 2009 the official name for the village.
