= Gytsjerk =

Gytsjerk Giekerk
- Village
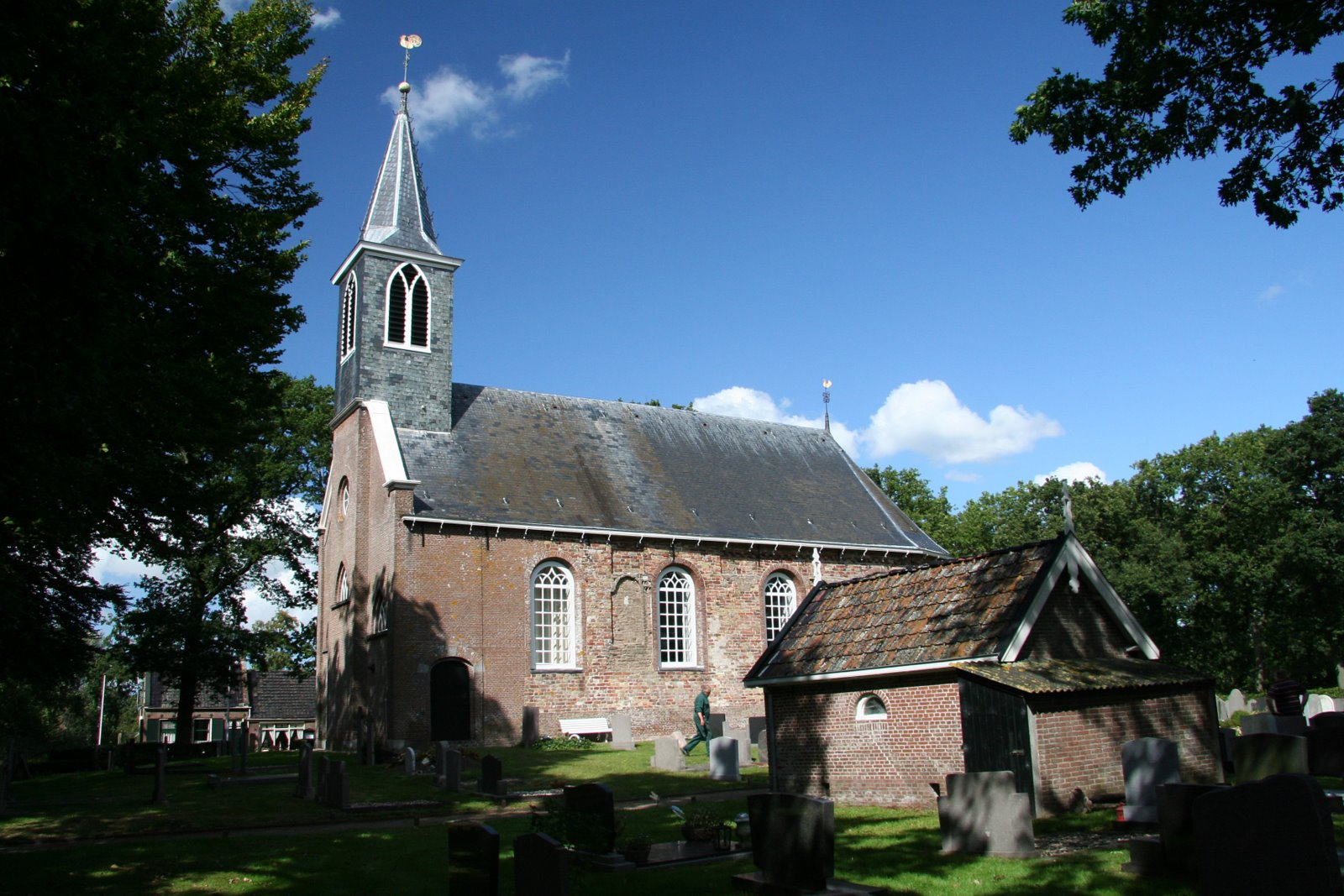
- St Martin's Church

- Coat of arms

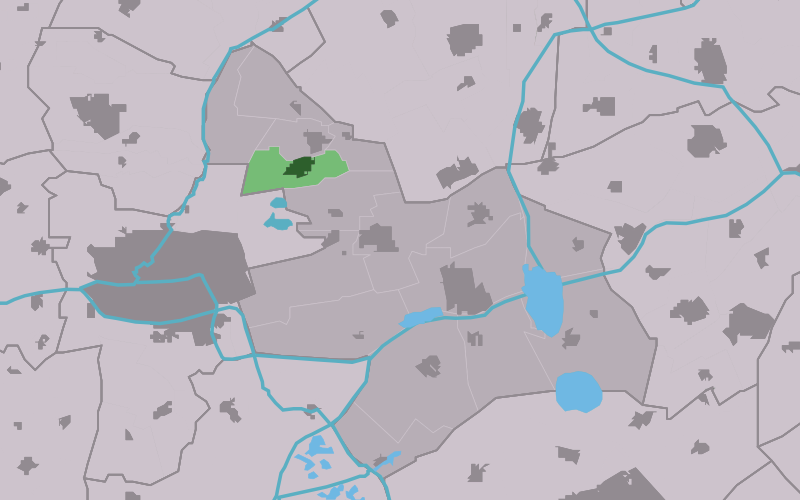
- Location of the village in Tytsjerksteradiel

- Location in the Netherlands Gytsjerk (Netherlands)
- Country: Netherlands
- Province: Friesland
- Municipality: Tytsjerksteradiel

Area
  - Total: 5.74 km^{2} (2.22 sq mi)
- Elevation: 0.6 m (2.0 ft)

Population (2021)
  - Total: 2,275
  - Density: 396/km^{2} (1,030/sq mi)
- Time zone: UTC+1 (CET)
  - Summer (DST): UTC+2 (CEST)
- Postal code: 9061
- Dialing code: 058

Gytsjerk (West Frisian pronunciation: [ˈɡitsjɛrk]; Dutch: Giekerk [ˈɣikɛr(ə)k]) is a village in Tytsjerksteradiel in the province of Friesland, the Netherlands. It had a population of around 2,300 in 2018.

== History ==
The village was first mentioned in 1439 as Gheszerka, and means "church of Gye (person)". Gytsjerk developed in the middle ages on a sandy ridge. Later, a linear settlement appeared further westwards along the Leeuwarden to Dokkum. The Protestant church was built at the end of the 12th century and was enlarged in the early-16th century. The tower dates from the early-19th century.

Gytsjerk was home to 336 people in 1840. The cooperative dairy factory Trynwâlden was constructed in 1896. It was enlarged and renovated in 1921 and a laboratory was added. From the 1960s onwards, it started to become a suburb of Leeuwarden. Between 2016 and 2017, the shopping mall was demolished and replaced by a new shopping mall.

== Notable buildings ==
- The Protestant church of Gytsjerk

== Gallery ==
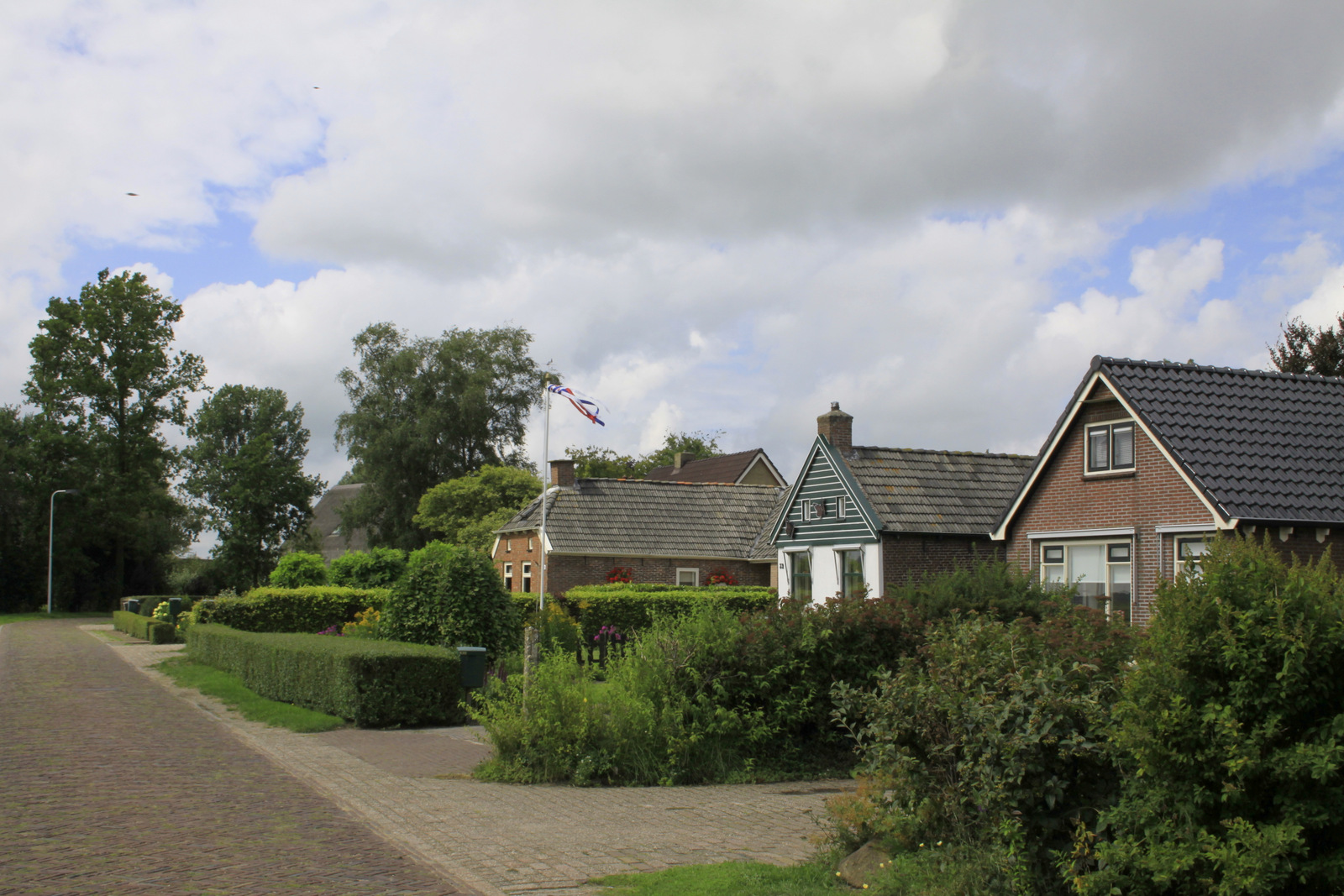
Street in Gytsjerk

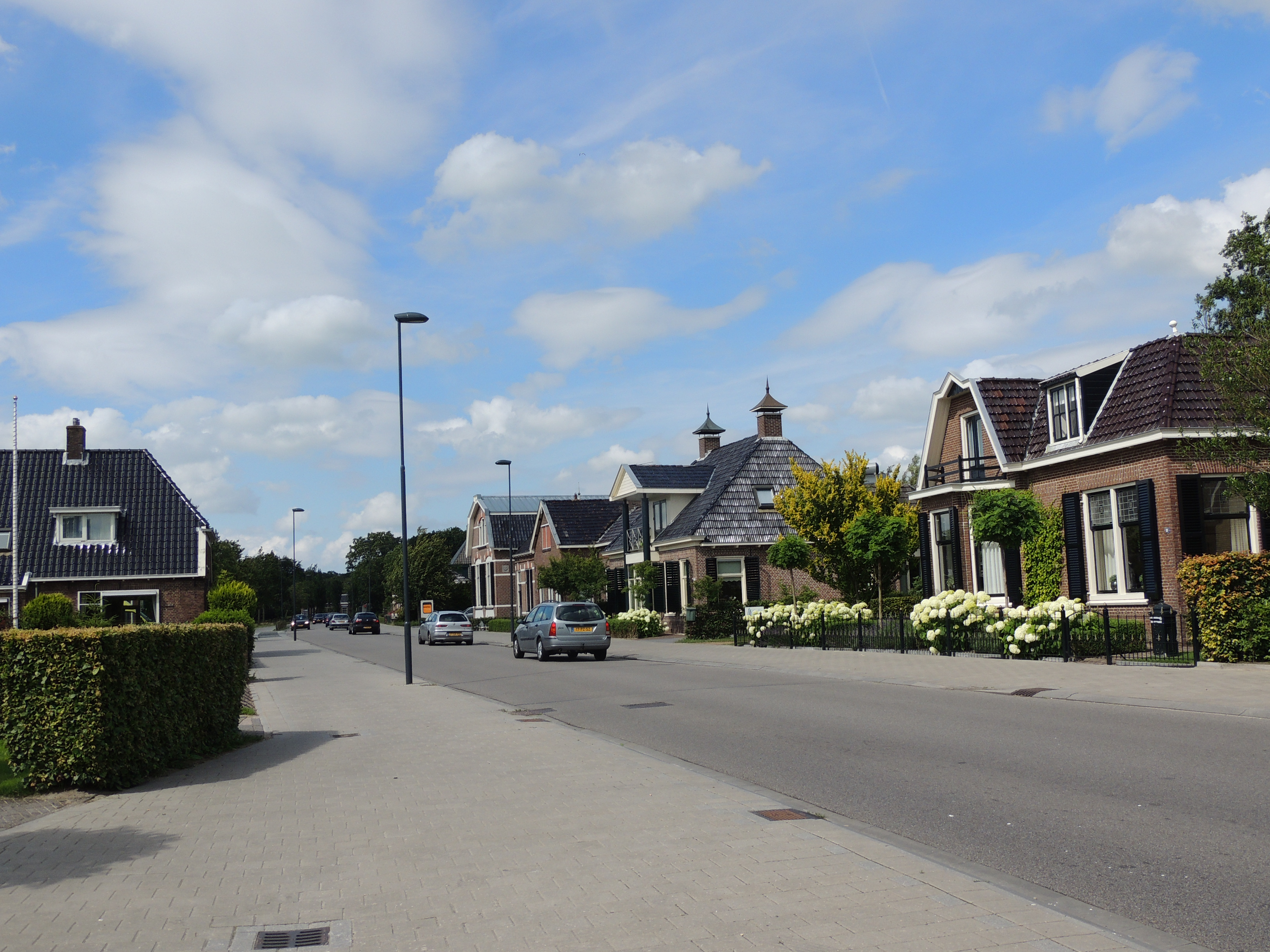
Street view

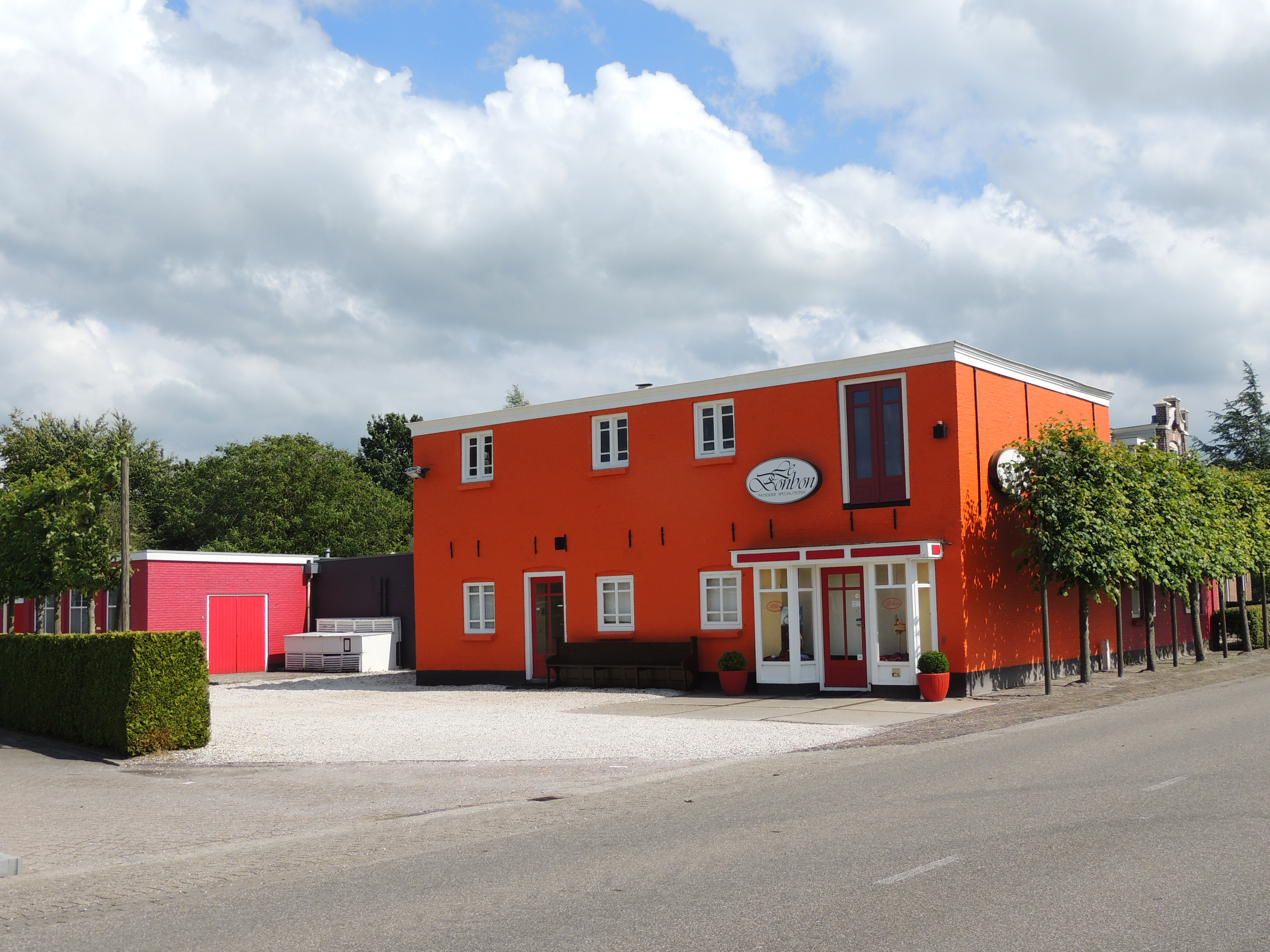
Former rye bread factory

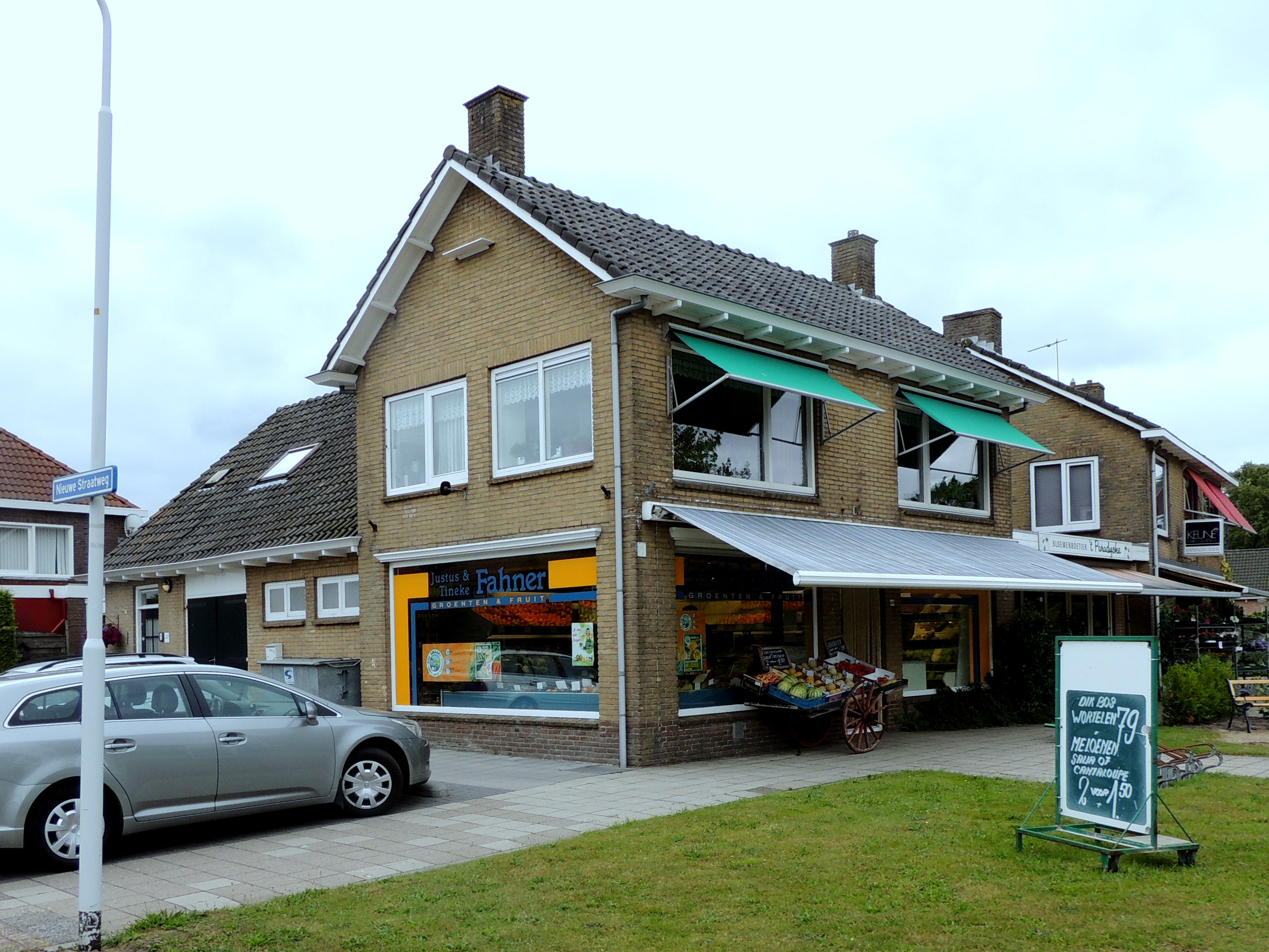
Greengrocer
