= Jacoba Rauwerda =

Dutch brothel manager

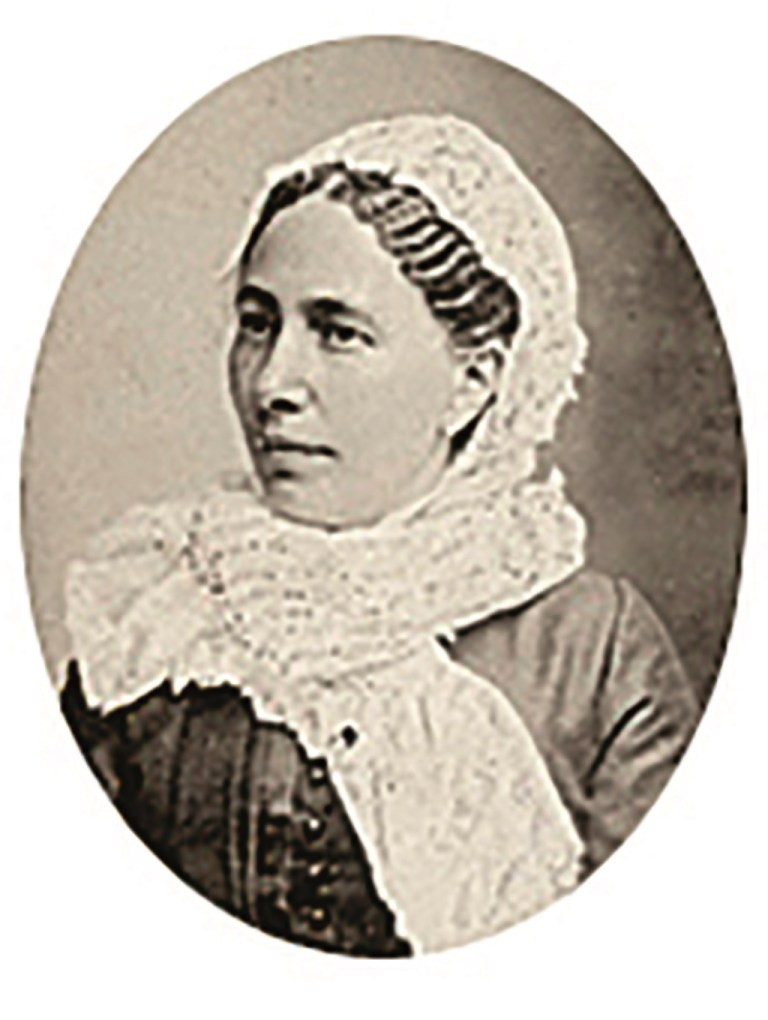
Jacoba Rauwerda

Jacoba Rauwerda (1835–1919) was a Dutch brothel manager. She was the owner and manager of the most famous brothel in 19th-century Amsterdam, the Maison Weinthal, between 1877 and 1902.

She was the daughter of Jurjentje Aukes Rauwerda. Her father is unconfirmed.

As an adult, she lived as the kept mistress of the nobleman Willem van Loon, who left her an allowance upon his death in 1877, which made her financially secure for the rest of her life. The same year, her mother also died, which gave her a new occupation.

She took over the brothel after the death of her mother in 1877 and managed it until it was closed down in 1902.
