= Oentsjerk =

Oentsjerk Oenkerk
- Village
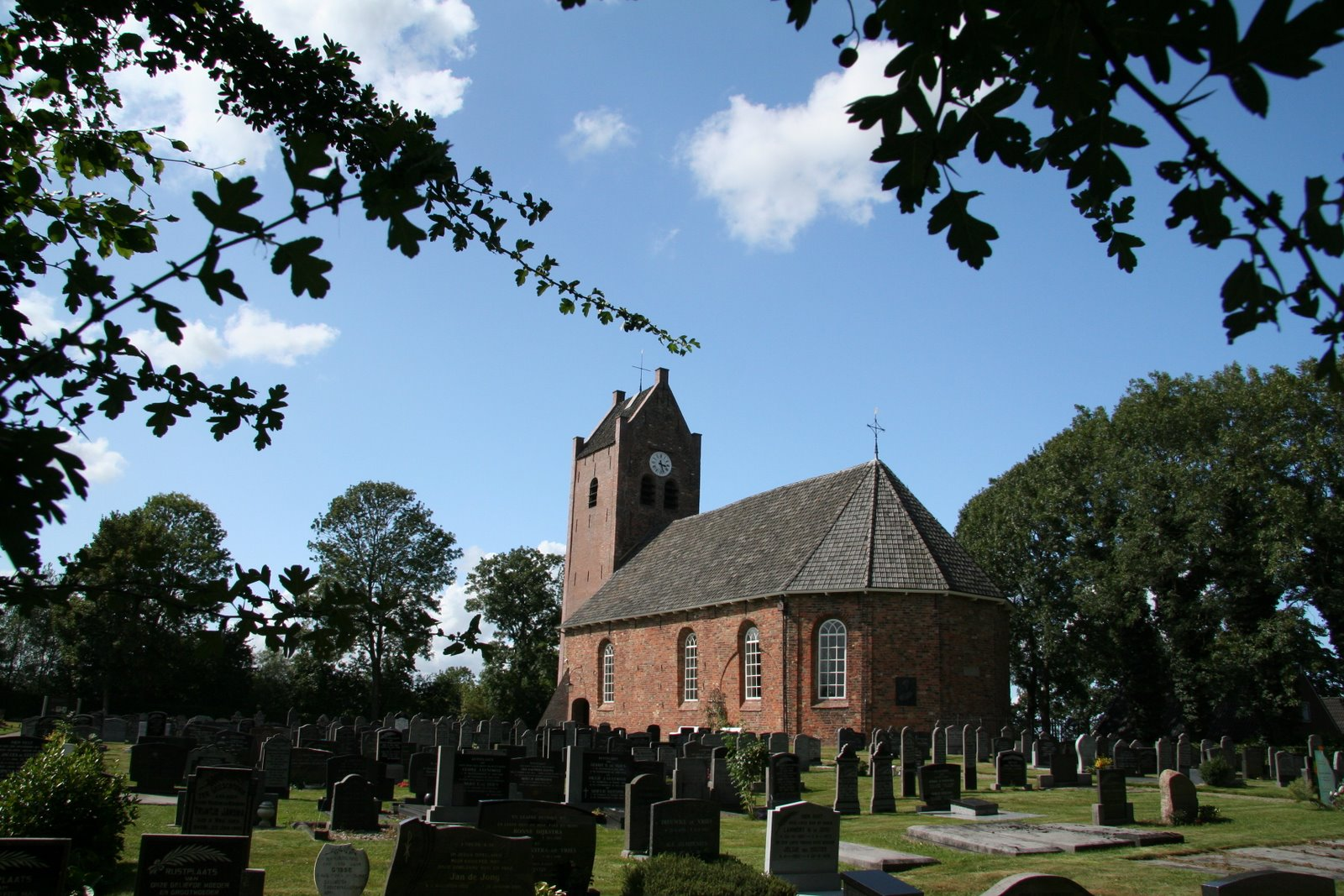
- St Mary's Church

- Coat of arms

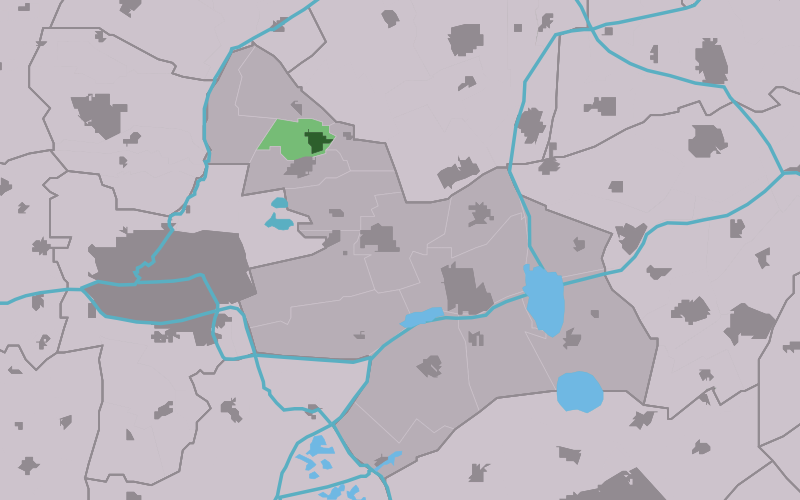
- Location of the village in Tytsjerksteradiel

- Location in the Netherlands Oentsjerk (Netherlands)
- Country: Netherlands
- Province: Friesland
- Municipality: Tytsjerksteradiel

Area
  - Total: 3.81 km^{2} (1.47 sq mi)
- Elevation: 0.7 m (2.3 ft)

Population (2021)
  - Total: 1,995
  - Density: 524/km^{2} (1,360/sq mi)
- Time zone: UTC+1 (CET)
  - Summer (DST): UTC+2 (CEST)
- Postal code: 9062
- Dialing code: 058

Oentsjerk (Dutch: Oenkerk) is a village in Tytsjerksteradiel in the province of Friesland, the Netherlands. It had a population of around 1,784 in January 2017. Oentsjerk is known for its agricultural practical training centre and large elderly care facility, the two largest employers of the town.

== History ==
The village was first mentioned in 1408 as Ontzerka, and means "church of Oene (person)". Oentsjerk developed in the Middle Ages on a sandy ridge. Later, it was extended along the Leeuwarden to Dokkum road.

The Protestant church was built in 1230 as a replacement of a 12th-century predecessor. It has been enlarged and altered multiple times and restored between 1974 and 1976.

Several estates were built near Oentsjerk, however only Stania State has remained. Eysinga State has become a retirement home. The stins Stania State was probably built in the 16th century. The current estate dates from 1843. Around 1520, it was turned into a castle-like building. In 1546, it became a property of the van Heemstra family who owned it for two centuries, but let it deteriorate. In 1738, it was demolished. In 1843, a new manor house by Looxma who had made a fortune in oil mills. A large garden designed by Lucas Roodbaard is laid out. In the 1930s, it became a youth hostel, conference centre and contained an outpost of the Fries Museum. In the 1970s, it was bought by the municipality who later sold it a company as an office building.

Oentsjerk was home to 441 people in 1840. In the late-20th century it became a commuter's village.

== Notable buildings ==
- The Protestant church of Oentsjerk

== Gallery ==
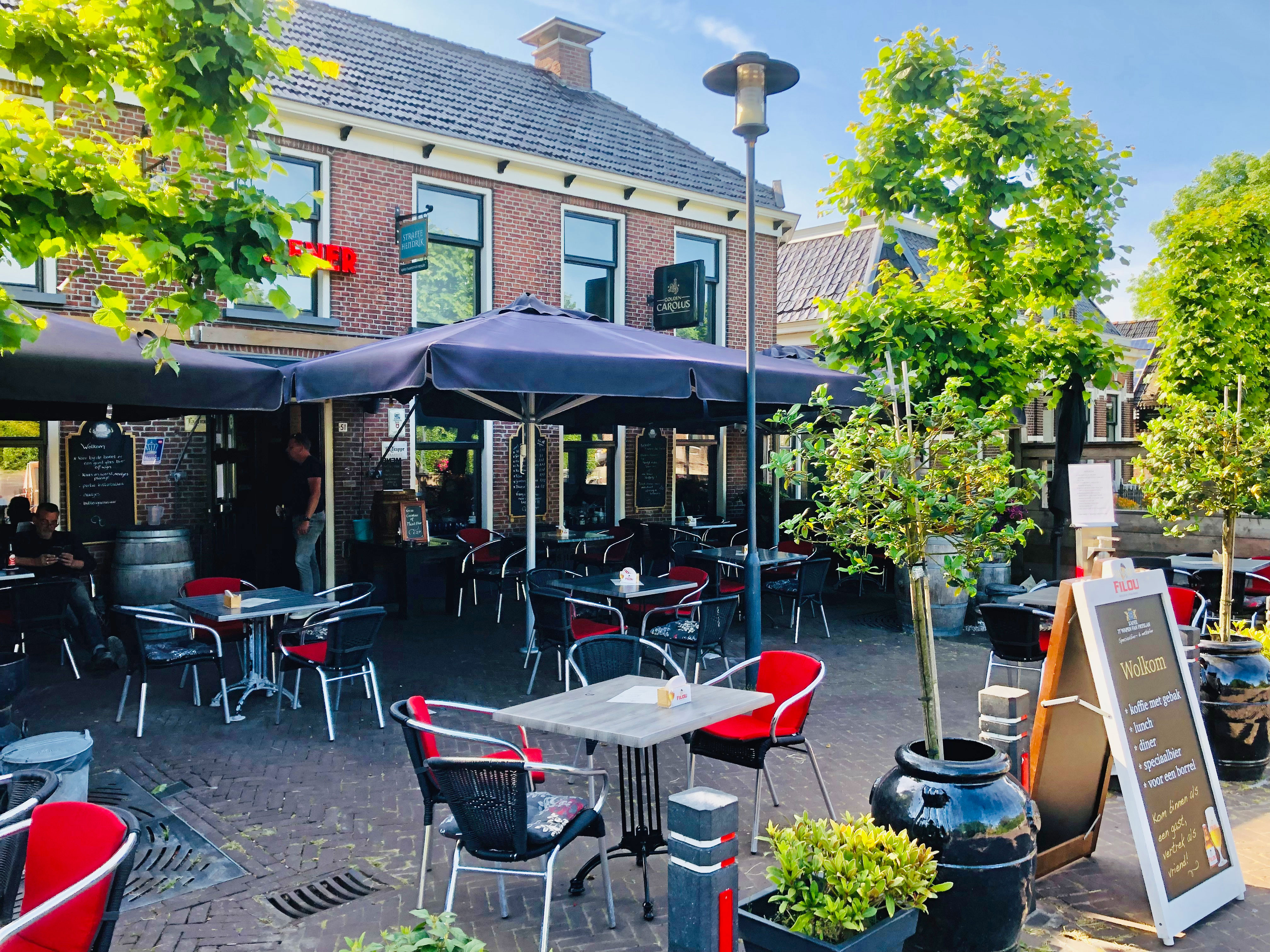
Pub in Oentsjerk

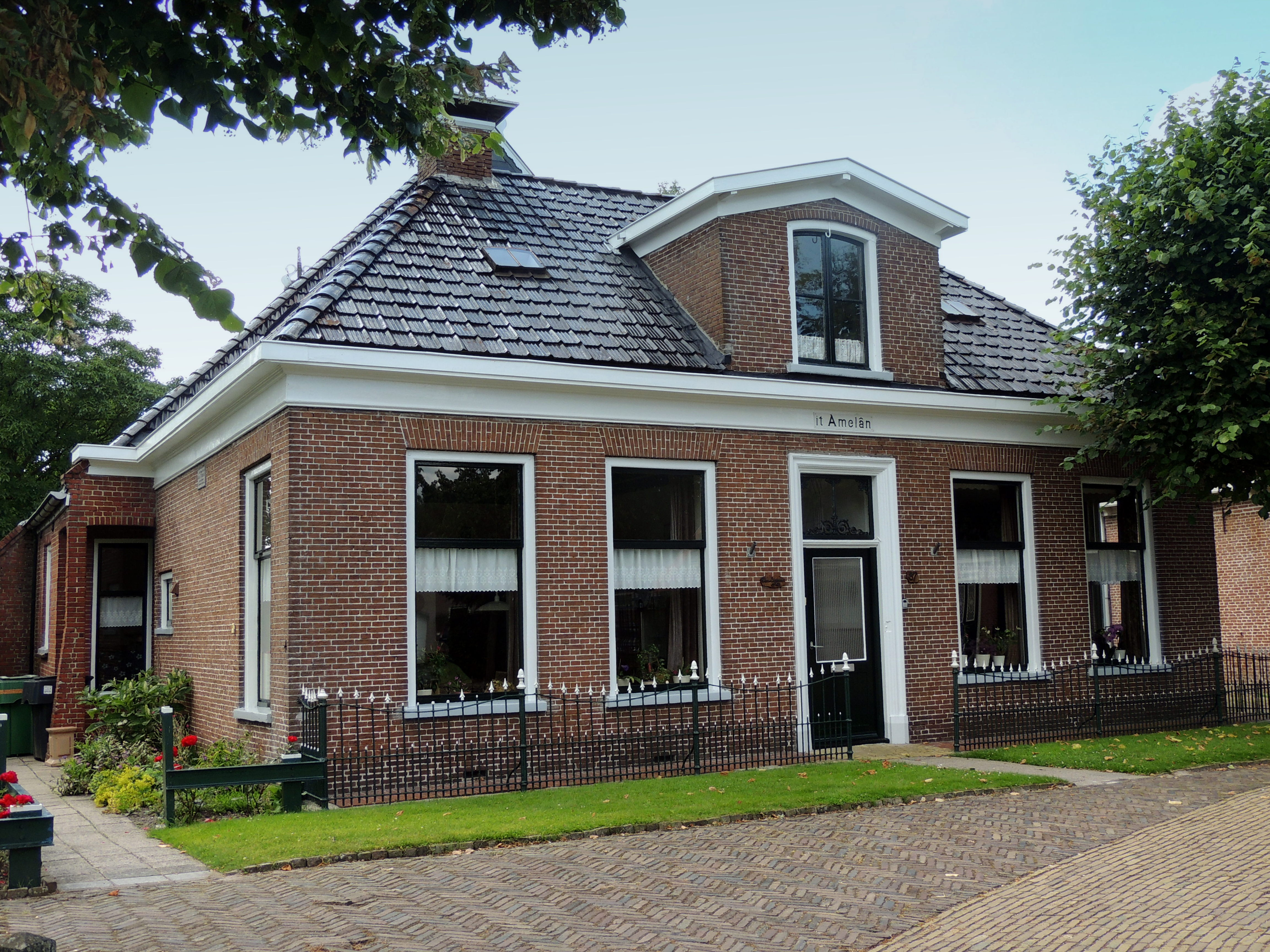
House in Oentsjerk

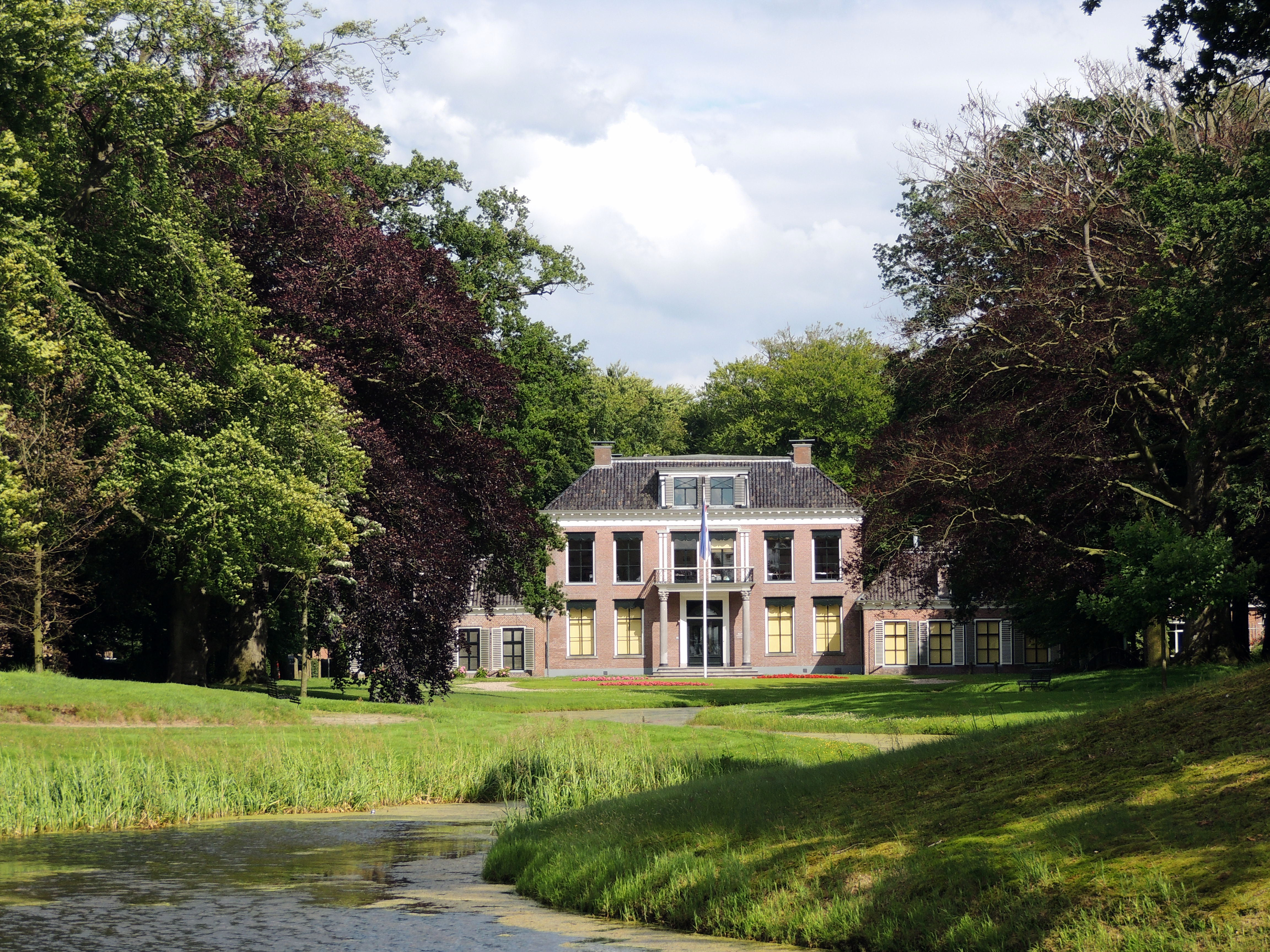
Stania State

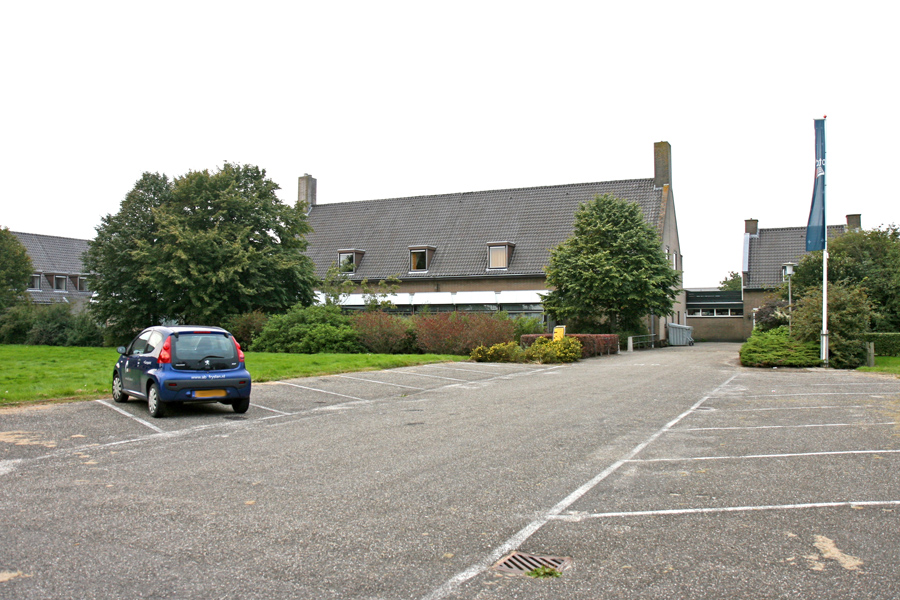
Agricultural training centre
