= De Bullemolen, Lekkum =

Smock mill in the Netherlands

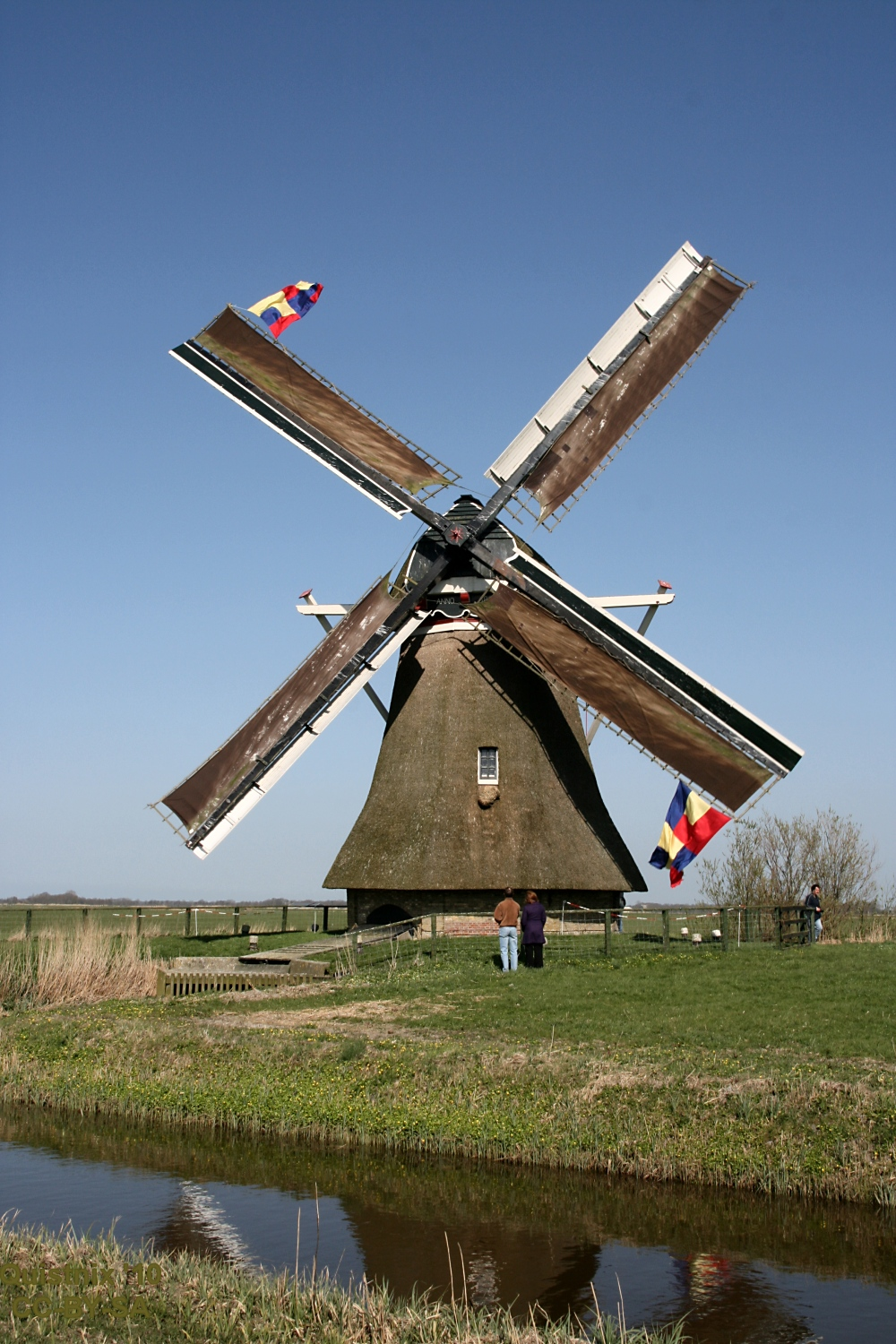
- De Bullemolen, April 2010.

Origin
- Mill name: De Bullemolen
- Mill location: Kealledykje 7, 9081 AX Lekkum
- Coordinates: 53°13′24″N 5°50′36″E
- Operator(s): Stichting De Fryske Mole
- Year built: 1825

Information
- Purpose: Drainage mill
- Type: Smock mill
- Storeys: Three-storey smock
- Base storeys: Single-storey base
- No. of sails: Four sails
- Type of sails: Common sails, one pair fitted with Fauël system on leading edges.
- Windshaft: Cast iron
- Winding: Tailpole and winch
- Type of pump: Archimedes' screw

De Bullemolen English: The Executioner's Mill is a smock mill in Lekkum, Friesland, Netherlands which was built in 1825. The mill has been restored to working order and is listed as a Rijksmonument, number 24505.

== History ==
De Bullemolen was originally built at Tytsjerk, where it drained the Louwsmeer polder. It was moved in 1825 to its current position, where it drains the Litspolder. The name De Bullemolen is said to have come from the occupation of an early owner, who was the beul of Leeuwarden. De Bullemolen was one of the first windmills in Friesland to be fitted with sails that had leading edges on the Fok system.

A restoration of the mill was carried out in 1968. The mill was sold on 28 March 1988 to Stichting De Fryske Mole (English: Frisian Mills Foundation). In 1995, millwright Thijs Jellema of Birdaard carried out further restoration. A new Archimedes' screw and new sails were fitted and the winding mechanism was renewed. In 2006, the mill was officially designated by Wetterskap Fryslân as being held in reserve for use in times of emergency. It is near the finishing point of the Elfstedentocht (English: Eleven Cities Tour).

== Description ==
De Bullemolen is what the Dutch describe as a Grondzeiler. It is a three-storey smock mill on a single-storey base. There is no stage, the sails reaching almost to ground level. The mill is winded by tailpole and winch. The smock and cap are thatched. The sails are Common sails, with one pair having leading edges on the Fauël system. They have a span of 20.50 metres (67 ft 3 in). The sails are carried on a cast-iron windshaft. which was cast by Fabrikaat L Enthoven en Compagnië in 1882. The windshaft also carries the brake wheel which has 55 cogs. This drives the wallower (30 cogs) at the top of the upright shaft. At the bottom of the upright shaft the crown wheel, which has 40 cogs drives a gearwheel with 33 cogs on the axle of the Archimedes' screw. The axle of the Archimedes' screw is 580 millimetres (1 ft 11 in) diameter. The screw is 1.44 metres (4 ft 9 in) diameter and 4.82 metres (15 ft 10 in) long. It is inclined at 18°. Each revolution of the screw lifts 1,130 litres (250 imp gal) of water.

== Public access ==
De Bullemolen is open to the public by appointment.
