= Lekkum =

- Village
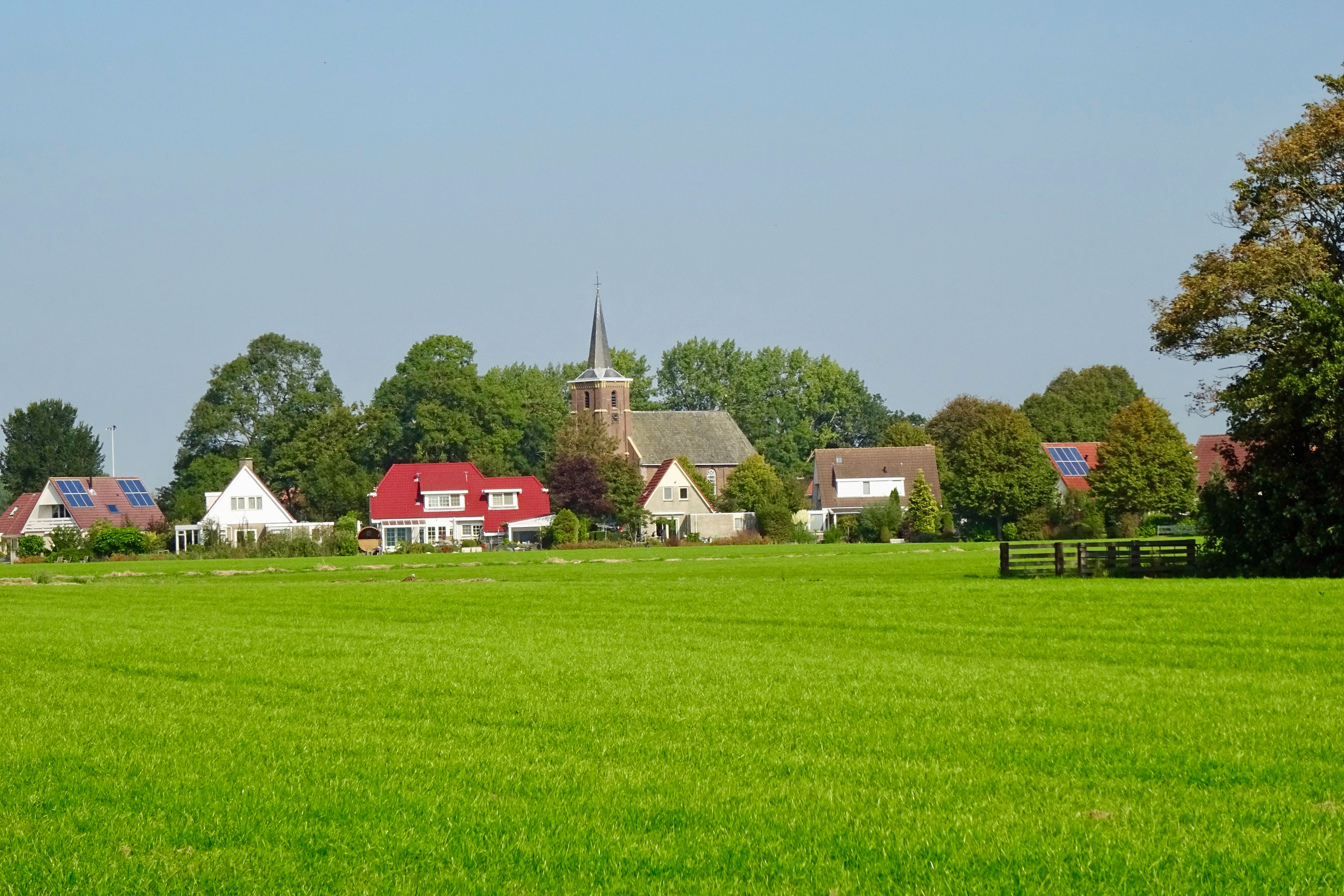

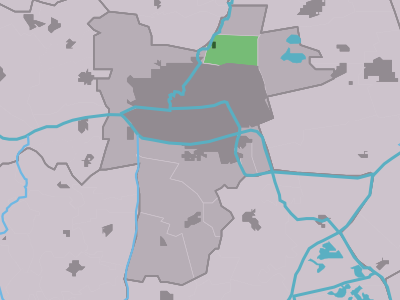
- Location in Leeuwarden municipality

- Location in the Netherlands Lekkum (Netherlands)
- Country: Netherlands
- Province: Friesland
- Municipality: Leeuwarden

Area
  - Total: 5.32 km^{2} (2.05 sq mi)
- Elevation: 0.6 m (2.0 ft)

Population (2021)
  - Total: 435
  - Density: 81.8/km^{2} (212/sq mi)
- Time zone: UTC+1 (CET)
  - Summer (DST): UTC+2 (CEST)
- Postal code: 9081 & 9082
- Dialing code: 058

Lekkum is a village in Leeuwarden municipality in the Friesland province of the Netherlands. It had a population of around 405 in January 2017.

De Bullemolen in Lekkum marks the finishing point of the Elfstedentocht.

== History ==
The village was first mentioned in the 13th century as Lackum. The etymology is unclear. The Dutch Reformed church was built in 1778 as a replacement for a medieval church. The tower was rebuilt in 1896. The polder mill De Bullemolen was built in 1825. Since 2006, it serves as a backup for the pumping station. In 1840, Lekkum was home to 127 people.

Before 1944, Lekkum was part of Leeuwarderadeel municipality.

== Gallery ==
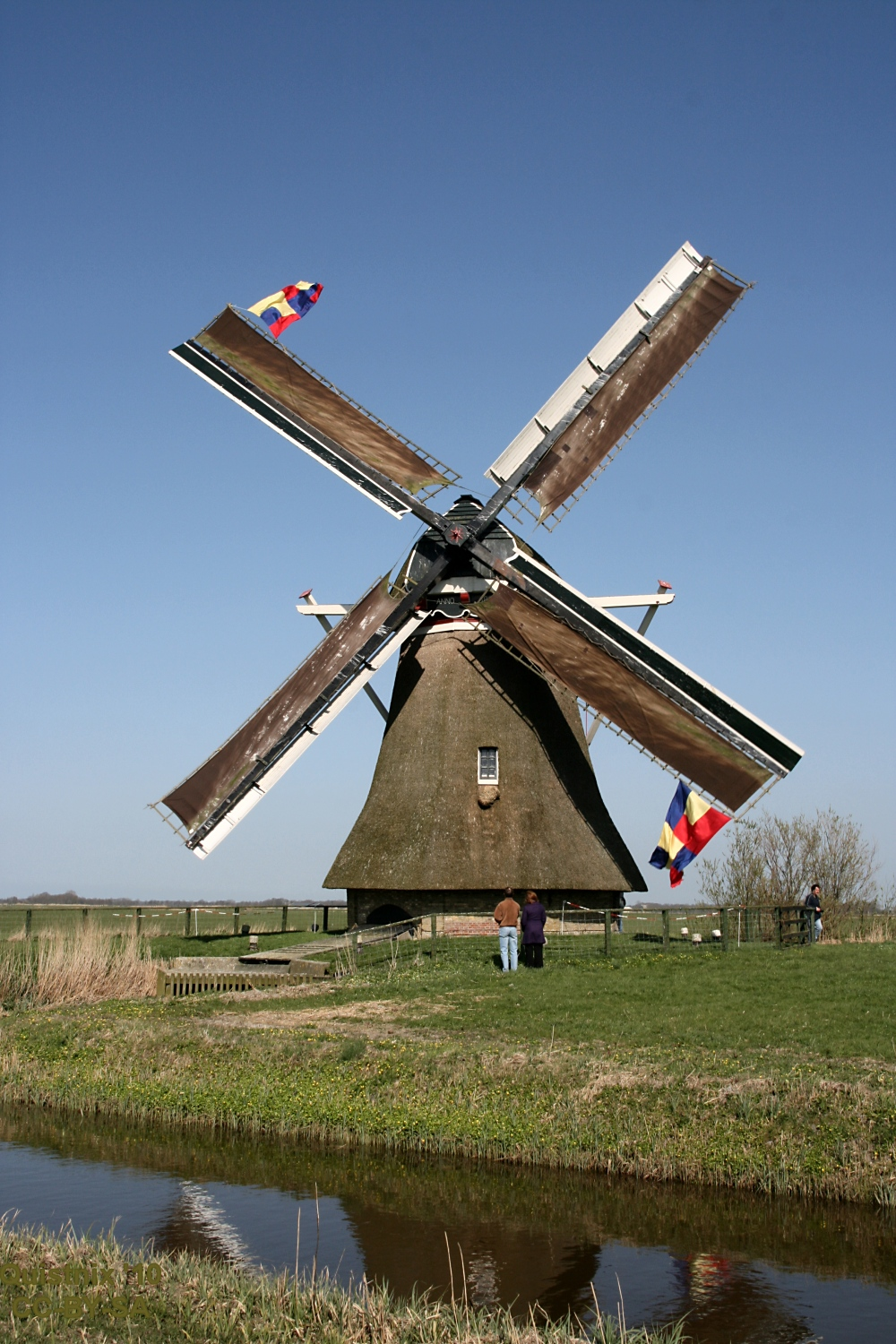
De Bullemolen

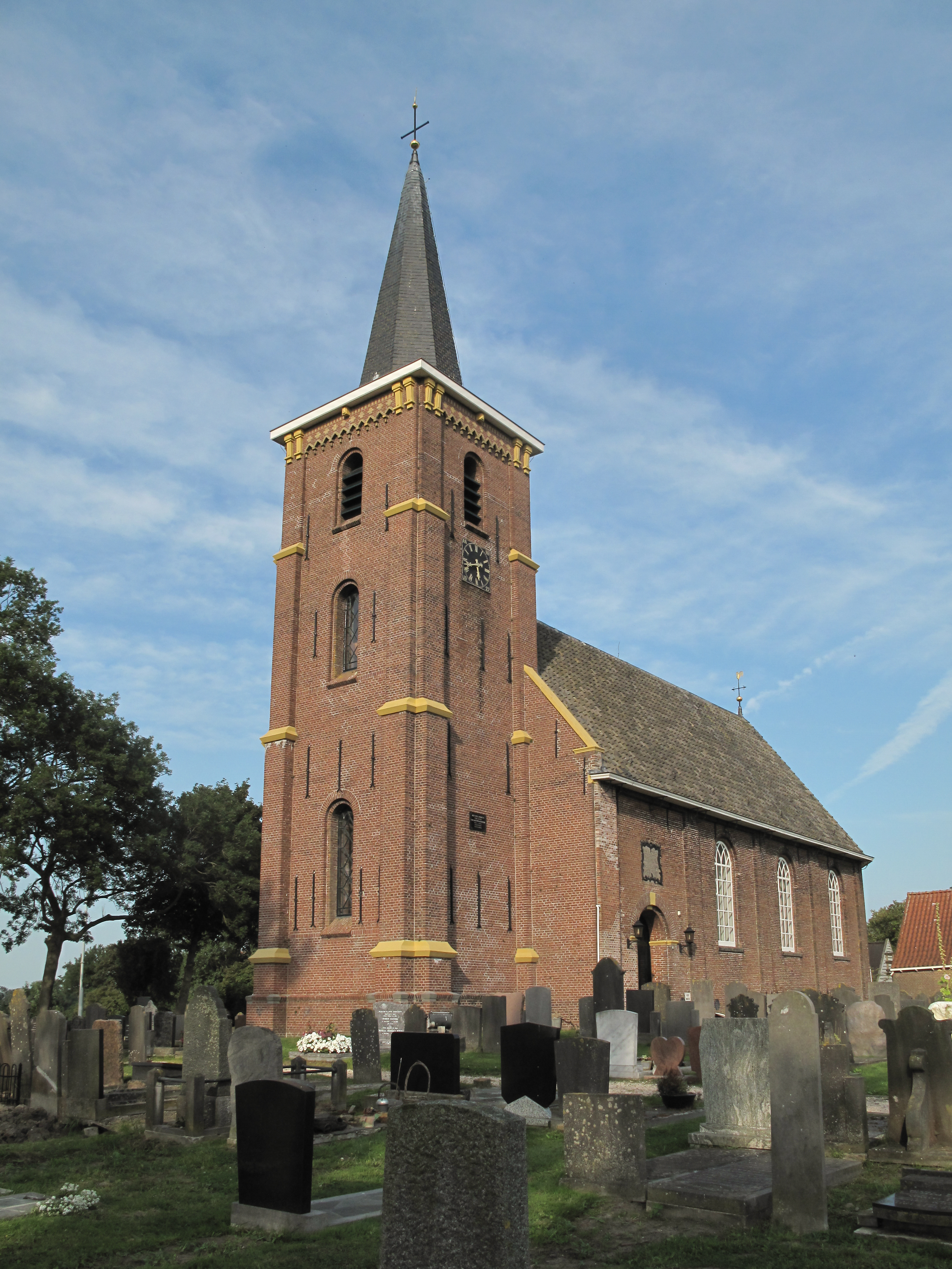
Lekkum Church

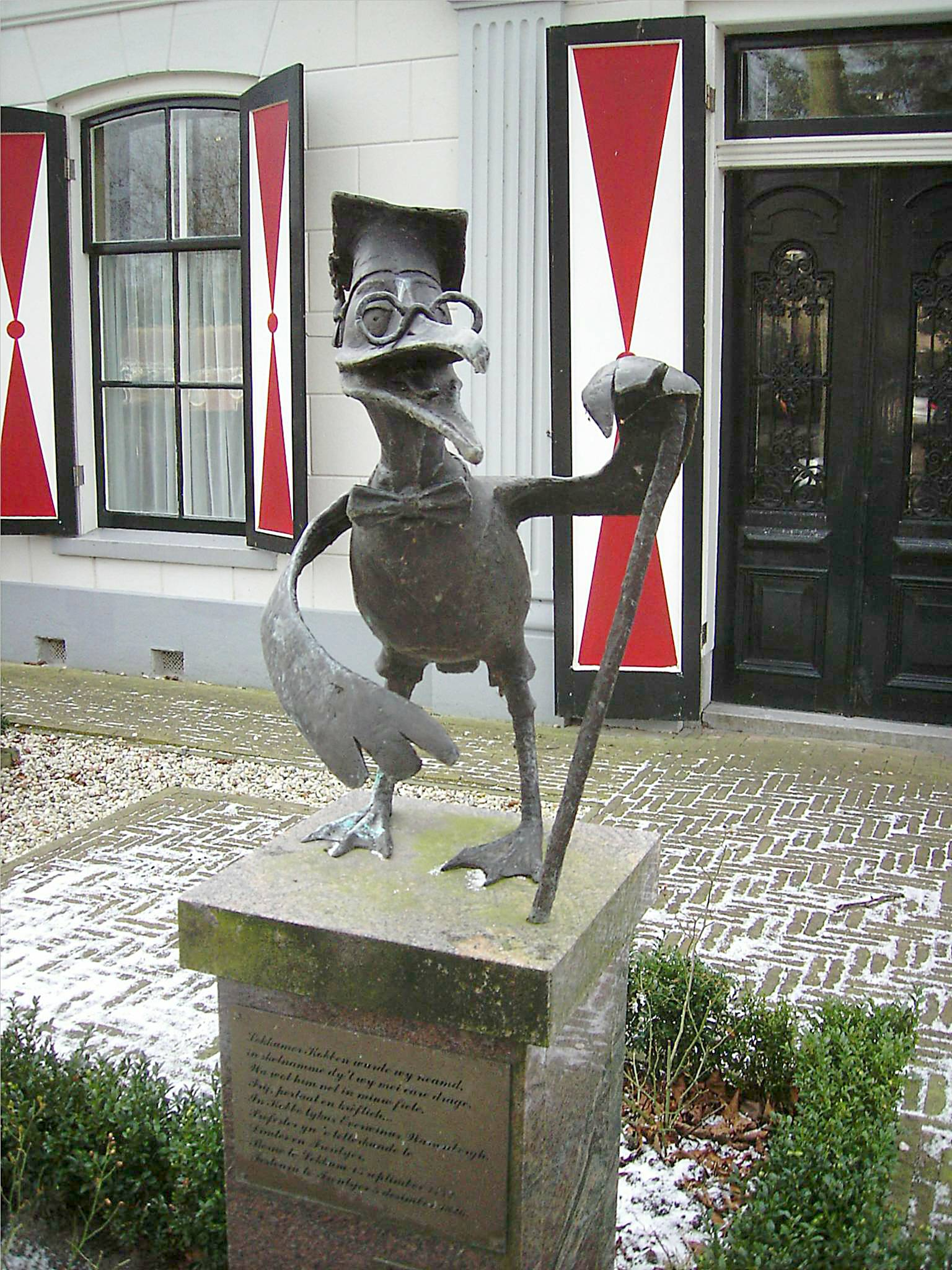
De Kobbe statue

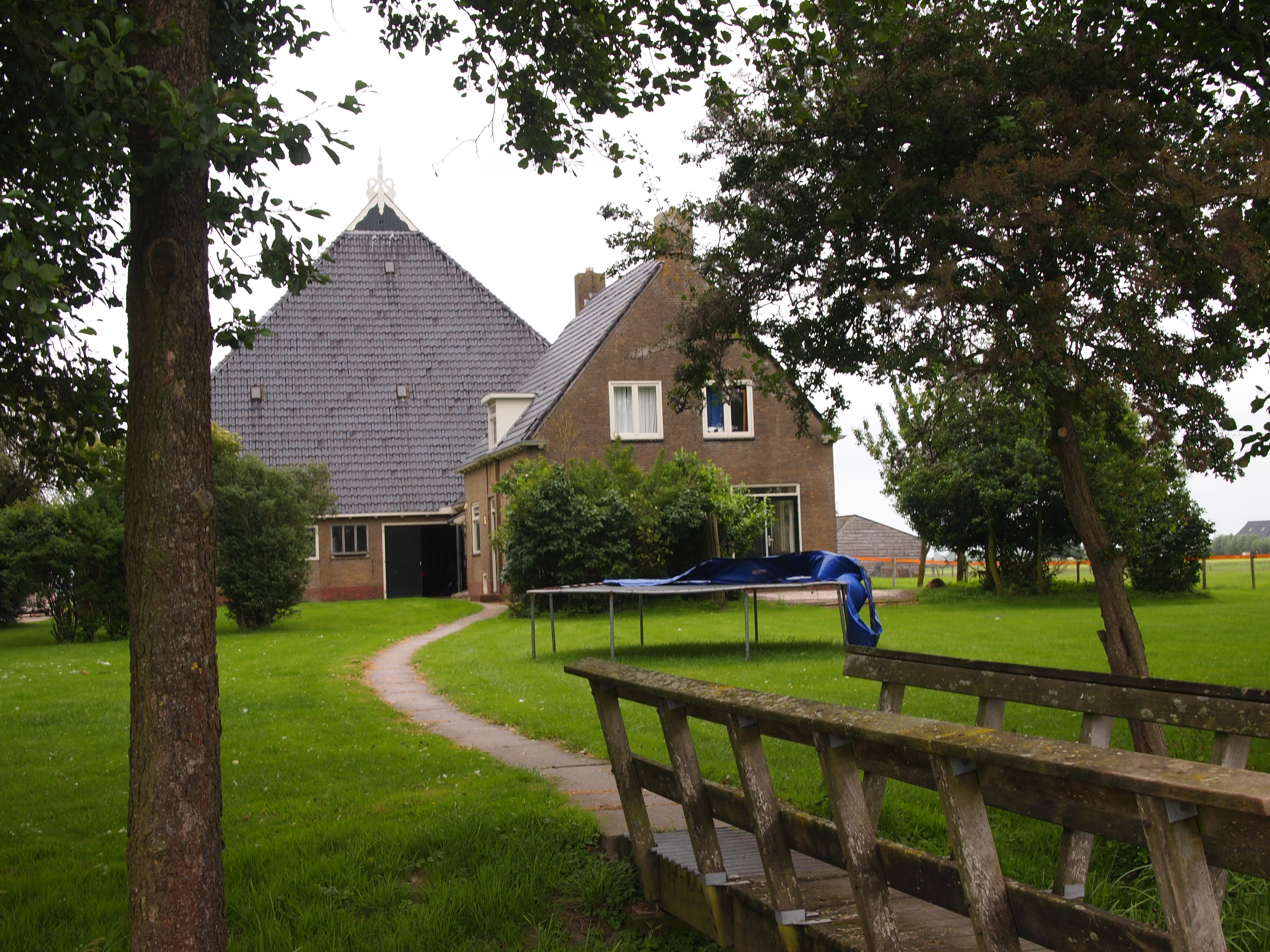
Farm near Lemmer
