= Houkje Gerrits Bouma =

Dutch speed skater (1788–1857)

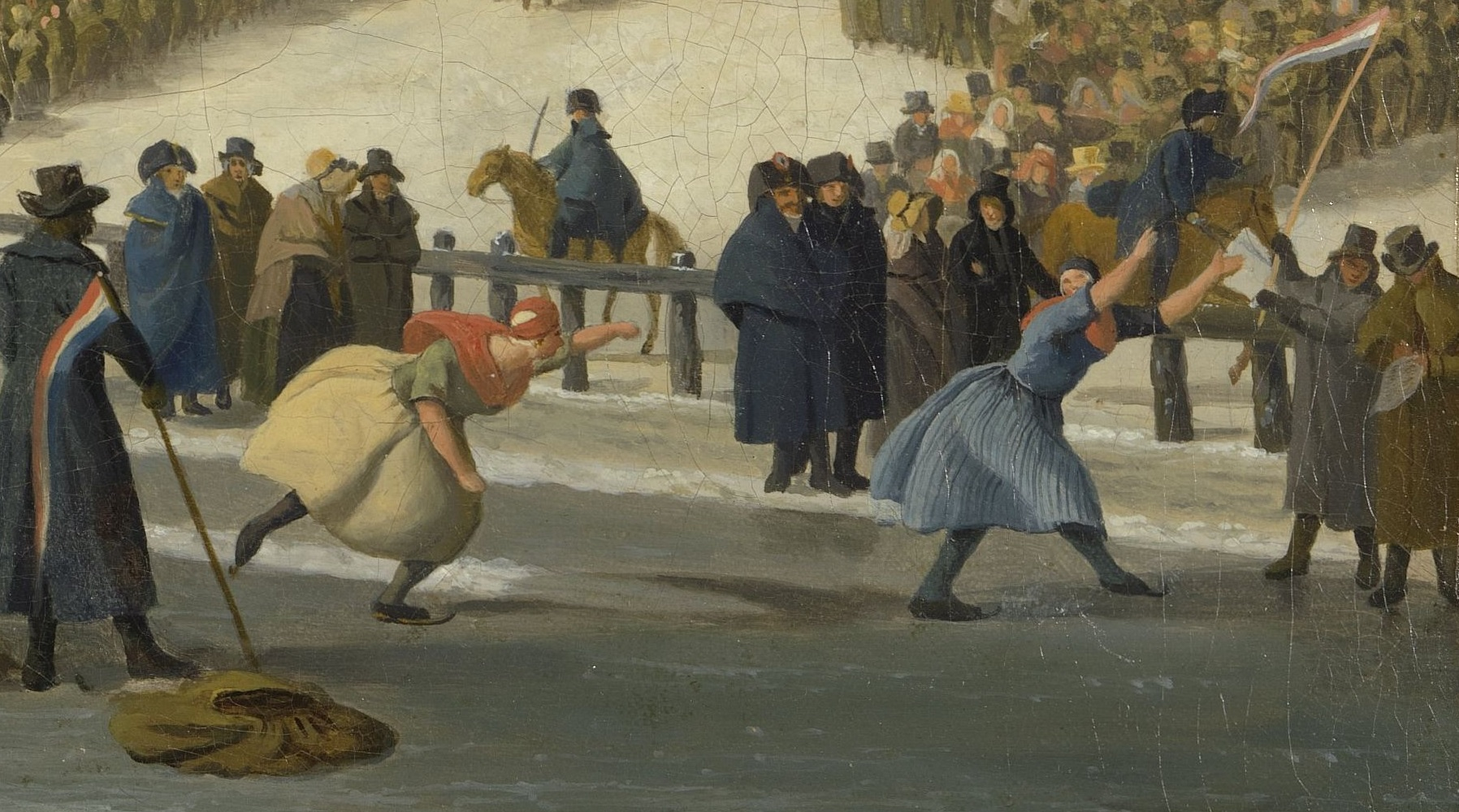
- Bouma (right) winning the women's speed skating competition in 1809

Personal information
- Born: 12 January 1788 Akkerwoude, Friesland, Dutch Republic
- Died: 8 August 1857 (aged 69) Burgum, Friesland, United Kingdom of the Netherlands

Sport
- Country: Kingdom of Holland
- Sport: Speed skating (kortebaan)

Houkje Gerrits Bouma (Dutch pronunciation: [ˈɦʌukjə ˈɣɛrɪts ˈbʌumaː]; 12 January 1788 – 8 August 1857), with surnames van der Veen, van der Schans and Vriezema from her marriages, was a Dutch female kortebaan speed skater who later lived in Veenwouden. She competed at the first known women's speed skating race in 1805 at the age of 16 and won the women's speed skating competition in 1809.

== Early life ==
Bouma was born in Akkerwoude. She was the daughter of Gerrit Mients Bouma and Geeske Ringers and was baptized on 3 February 1788.

== Career ==
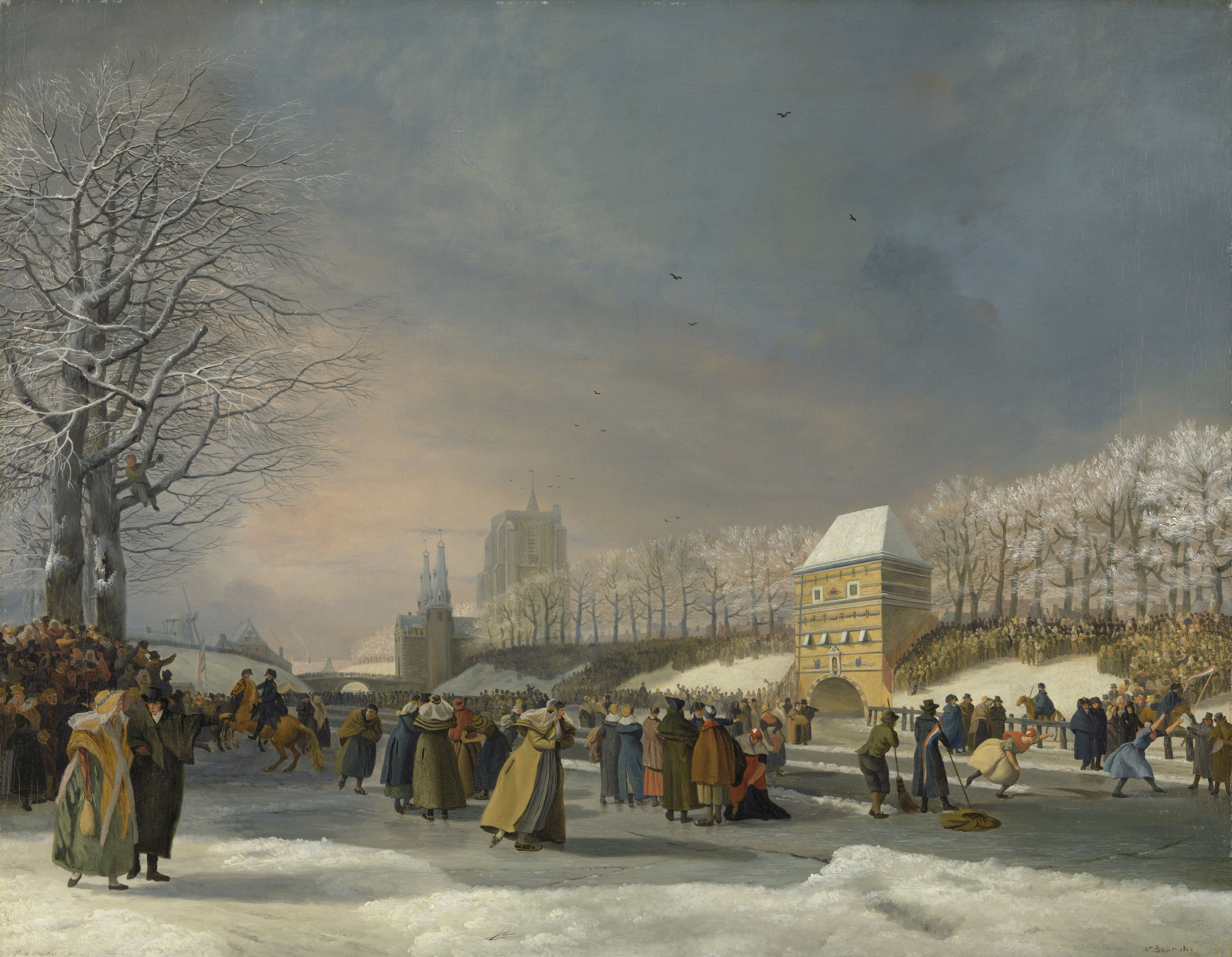
The final of the women's competition on the stadsgracht, 20 January 1809

When Bouma was 16 years old, she competed at the first known women's speed skating race in 1805. There were 128 women competing in Oldehove, Leeuwarden. Bouma won against Maaijke Sijbes from Oudwoude, in the second heat of Baukje Jacobs against Oudwoude and later against Sijtske Taeks from Rijperkerk. The next day she beat Wijtske Pieters from Eernewoude and in the fifth heat Rintje Redmers from Oppenhuizen. Only four women were left in the competition. She lost to Trijntje Pieters Westra from Poppingawier, who would later win the competition.

Four years later, on 20 January 1809, Bouma competed again in the women's race in Oldehove on the stadsgracht. At this competition, 64 unmarried women participated. Bouma made it to the final, in which she defeated Maike Meyers from Heeg and won a golden oorijzer. Along the ice there were huge crowds watching the races. Johannes Rienks wrote a poem about this competition, and Nicolaas Baur made two oil paintings depicting the finish of the final race. For greater ease, skaters had thrown off their cloaks. This is also visible in Baur's painting, where he painted the finalists with bare arms and a jettisoned cloak on the ice. The women's bare arms caused a lot of commotion as they were seen as obscene, and so it was the last women's competition for many years until 1823. Bouma stopped competing after her victory in 1809.

== Personal life ==
Bouma married three times, surviving her first two husbands. She married Theunis Ybeles van der Veen (1787–1812) on 28 January 1810 in Veenwouden. They had a son, Yble, born in 1810. After the death of her husband she remarried to farmer Johan Cornelis van der Schans from Bergum on 11 November 1815. On 29 August 1816 they had a daughter named Antje. Four years later, her second husband died and she married for the third time at the age of 34 in November 1822 to Popke Binnes Vriezema. They had three children. The oldest son, Binne (born 13 September 1823), also became a speed skater, but was not as successful as his mother. Binne was the uncle of speed skaters Tijs, Okke, and Trijntje from Rijperkerk, who became the best Frisian speed skaters after 1870 (after the death of Bouma). Her daughter Geeske died at age 6 in 1832. The first name of Bouma, Baukje, would be in the family for at least five generations.

Bouma died on 8 August 1857 in Bergum, aged 69. At the time of her death, she was described as rentenier (pensioner), so was a fortunate woman in her last years.
