= Frouckje State =

Coordinates: 53°13′48.87″N 5°54′48.73″E

- Interactive map of Frouckje State

Restaurant information
- Established: 2003
- Head chef: Gilbert van der Heide
- Food type: International, Regional, French
- Location: Binnendijk 74, Ryptsjerk, 9256 HP, Netherlands
- Seating capacity: 40
- Website: Official website

Frouckje State is a restaurant in Ryptsjerk in the Netherlands. It is a fine dining restaurant that was awarded one Michelin star in the period 2009–2013. In the period 2006–2008, the restaurant was awarded a Bib Gourmand.

GaultMillau awarded the restaurant 15 out of 20 points.

Head chef of Frouckje State is Gilbert van der Heide. He took over the reign of the kitchen in 2006, when chef René Vaartjes left.

Frouckje State is in existence from 1976, as a party centre and restaurant. After many changes of ownership, Thom van der Heide and Johan Oordijk acquired the farmstead in 2003. They upgraded the restaurant to a fine dining restaurant. John Oordijk sold his part in the company to Maître d'hôtel Thom van der Heide, effective per 1 January 2010.

== See also ==
- List of Michelin starred restaurants in the Netherlands
