= Gelske Venema-Brouwer =

Dutch speed skater

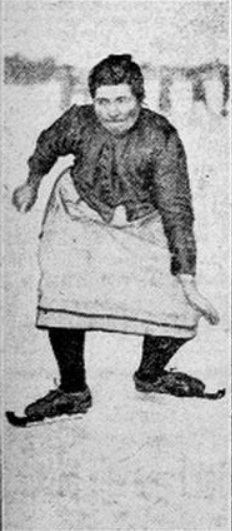
- Brouwer in 1922

Personal information
- Born: 6 January 1876 Achtkarspelen, Friesland, Netherlands
- Died: 20 January 1957 Burgum

Sport
- Country: Netherlands
- Sport: Speed skating (kortebaanschaatsen)

Gelske Venema-Brouwer (6 January 1876 — 20 January 1957) was a Dutch female kortebaanschaatsen speed skater. During her 28-year speed skating career she won a total of 77 prizes and 20 premiums.

== Early life ==
Brouwer was born in Achtkarspelen, the daughter of a sea captain. Later she moved to Bergum. As a child she showed skating ability, but her parents would not allow her to participate in speed skating competitions. Venema-Brouwer started with competitive speed skating in the winter of 1898–1899, after her marriage to Taeke Venema, also a skipper's child.

== Speed skating career ==
Venema-Brouwer's first competition was in Bergumer-Nieuwstad. she skated together with her husband, and at that time their first child was only seven weeks old. Because her skates were on board her parents' ship, she skated on borrowed skates. They won a premium. A few days later Venema-Brouwer competed again together with her husband at a competition in Twijzel. In this competition they won the first prize. During this speed skating season Venema-Brouwer kept improving. She won the first prize at the competition Nieuwebrug near Hoogkerk, beating Mina Oost. Later Venema-Brouwer competed in competitions with the highest prize money, against the strongest speed skaters. Venema-Brouwer competed and won many prizes also in Groningen. She won among others 3 times in Helpman and 4 times in Leek. She won two Leekster branches and also a medal.

Venema-Brouwe competed during 10 winters with Douwe van de Meer from Eernewoude. During one winter they won a prize in every competition they competed in. She has also won several prizes together with Cornelis Velstra.

In 1903 Venema-Brouwe won during one week on six consecutive days six first prizes (Grouw, Leeuwarden, Koudum, Akkrum, Roordahuizum). In 1911 she was the fastest rider in a main competition in Tolbert. During the strong winter of 1914-15 Venema-Brouwe won a total of f 600.

== Family and death ==
In the last years of her career, Venema-Brouwer's daughter Aaltje also started competing in speed skating. She did not have the same success as her mother but they won prizes and premiums in the same competitions, in Appingedam and other locations.

Venema-Brouwer died in Burgum in January 1957, aged 81.
