= Kortebaanschaatsen =

Dutch ice skating tournament

Dutch newsreel from 1979 about the winter period including at the end scenes from both a women's short track race in Genemuiden won by Anneke Zeinstra, and a horse-drawn sleigh race

Kortebaanschaatsen ('short track skating') is an old form of Dutch ice skating tournament that goes back to the 18th century. It is not to be confused with the modern speed skating sport known as short-track speed skating. The sport is similar to harness racing (known as Dutch: kortebaandraverijen) and is similarly set up in two straight lanes of 160 meters.

== History ==
Since 1805 women's kortebaanschaatsen is held over a distance of 140 meters. In the first race held for women in 1805 in Leeuwarden won by Trijntje Pieters Westra, the women were "just as fast as the horses", which referred to a previous kortebaandraverij that had been held previously that week with sleighs instead of wheeled sulkies. The full list of women participants with their ages and addresses was published in an account by Evert Maaskamp. The women's sport was popular because the women were skating with bare arms and were seen to be unusually talented and strong. A print was made that became popular, that was accompanied by another engraving with a commemorative descriptive text.

The first Dutch national champions were for men Thijs Klompmaker (1926) and for women Sjoukje Bouma (1933).

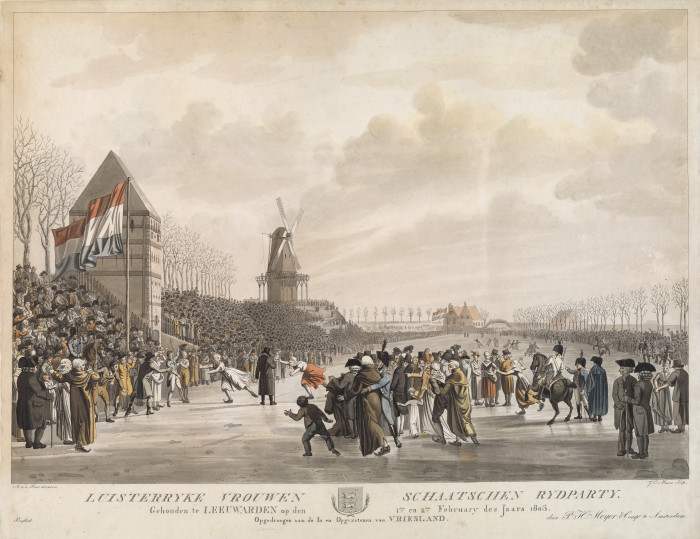
First women's race in Leeuwarden in 1805, won by Trijntje Pieters Westra

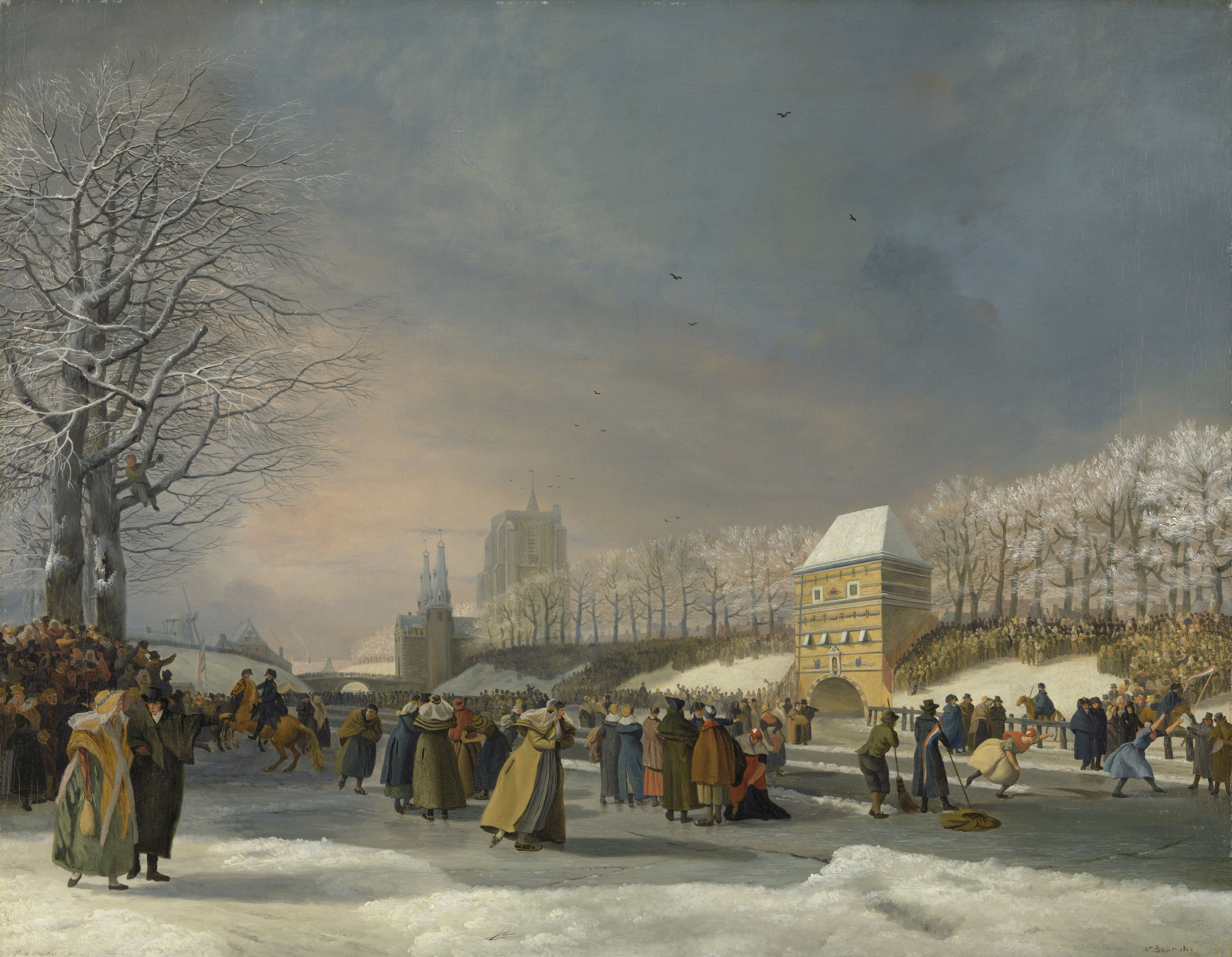
Women's race in Leeuwarden in 1809, won by Houkje Gerrits Bouma

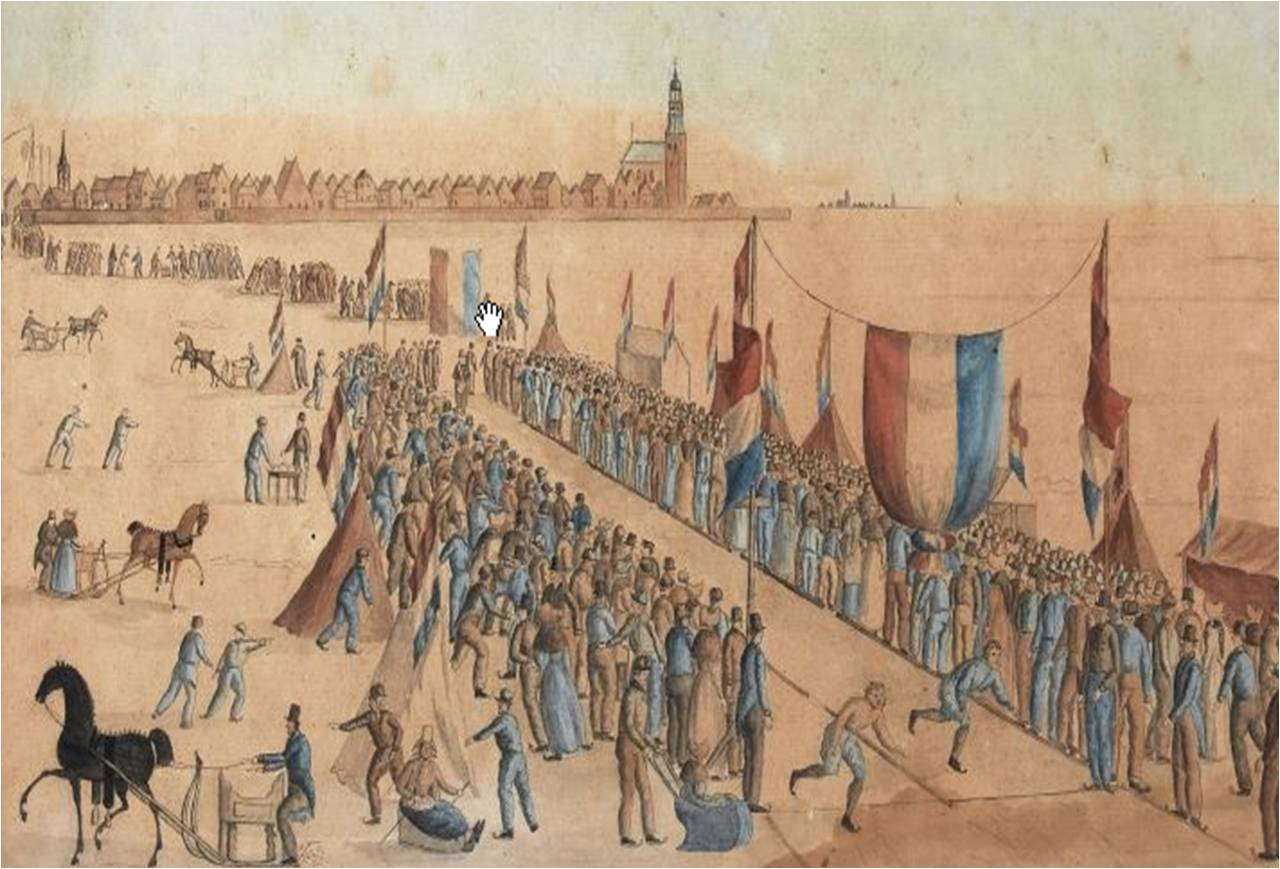
Race in Hindeloopen in 1828

=== Competitions ===
- Dutch National Kortebaanschaatsen Championships

== Modern kortebaanschaatsen ==
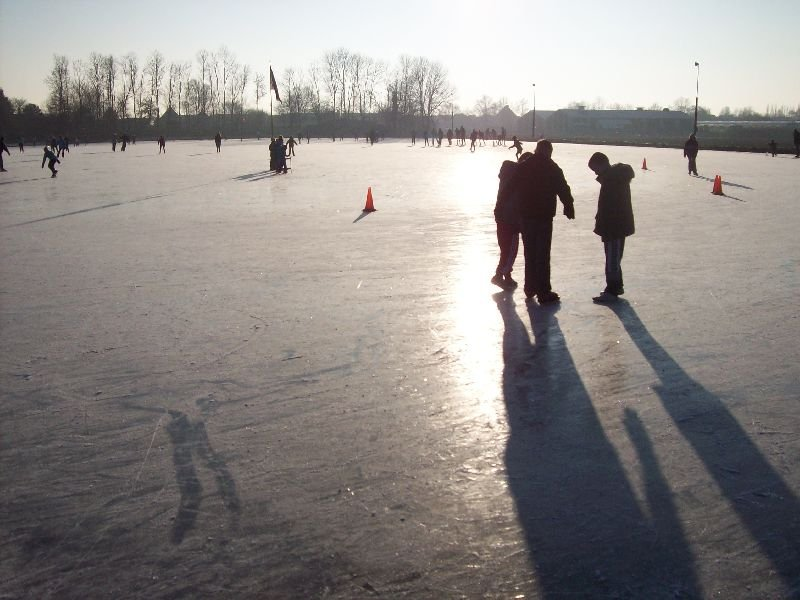
Outdoor skating track in Venhuizen, named after Teun Sluis

Today most large Dutch cities have indoor skating rinks, and the rise of speed skating as a sport has enabled many young skaters to learn early how to skate through turns, which was never necessary on kortebaan tracks. With shorter and shorter periods of frost, fewer and fewer kortebaan sprint tournaments were held, which caused the creation of the indoor sprint alternative now known as KNSB Dutch Super Sprint Championships.

== Skaters ==
=== Women ===
- Trijntje Pieters Westra (1783-1861)
- Houkje Gerrits Bouma (1788-1857)
- Trijntje Reidinga (1799-1869)
- Anke Beenen (1853-1886)
- Jeltje van der Werf (1852-1934)
- Ynskje Wagenaar (born 1868)
- Lutske Wester (1870-1912)
- Gelske Venema-Brouwe (1876–1957)
- Joukje Postma (born 1877)
- Sytske Spijkstra (born 1877)
- Baukje de Boer-Veenstra (born 1881-1969)
- Geertje Engelsma (1887-1969)
- Martha Hemminga (1900-1968)
- Jitske sietzes-de Boer (born 1906-1977)
- Loltje Tolman-de Boer (born 1910)
- Tietje Spannenburg-Pagels (born 1906)
- Janna van der Meulen (1907–1981)
- Annie de Jong-Zondervan (1907-1972)
- Klaasje Hofstee (born 1909)
- Houkje van der Meer (born 1910)
- Trijntje Terpstra (born 1910)
- Geesje Woudstra (1911-1971)
- Sjoukje Bouma (1911-2008)
- Trijntje Hemminga (1914-1994)
- Griet Bijlsma (born 1915)
- Hennie Sietsema
- Annie Heersema
- Sietske Pasveer (1915-2001)
- Makke Groen (1917-1977)
- Antje Koopmans
- Pietje Feitsma (1918-1933)
- Durkje Huitema (1918–2010)
- Meta Nienhuis
- Fokje van der Velde (1918-2008)
- Lien van der Mei
- Ike Nienhuis (1921-2001)
- Annie Pijlman (1925-2013)
- Coba Hoekstra (born 1925)
- Joke Hoekstra
- Tjitske Hartoog-Minkema (1926–1990)
- Jantje Bosscha
- Rina Kooi
- Elske van Dam
- Annie van der Meer (1928-2004)
- Dirkje Kiers (born 1929)
- Saakje de Jong (born 1929)
- Lucie Koops
- Zwaantje Mulder
- Antje Sietema
- Sietske de Boer
- Geertje Brouwer
- Grietje Dieterman-Schuur
- Tine de Vries (1931–2014)
- Sita Homan-Wagemaker (1931–2015)
- Trijntje Jelsma
- Jeltje Haanstra
- Afke Stoker (born 1932)
- Akke de Boer
- Tine Huberts
- Jantje Hagenou-Bathoorn
- Riekje Tuinema-Ruben (born 1933)
- Henny Wiegersma-van den Brug (c. 1934-1988)
- Femmy Groen (born 1935)
- Martha Wieringa (1935-2008)
- Jantje Tienkamp (born 1936)
- Gooitske de Jong
- Antje Hoekstra (born 1938)
- Dinie Kussendrager (born 1939)
- Atje Keulen-Deelstra
- Ieuwkje Hoekstra
- Lutske Hiddinga
- Marijke Flisijn (1943–2007)
- Grietje Boelm (born 1944)
- Grietje Oosterhof
- Rinske Zeinstra
- Willy Burgmeyer
- Annie van Dalsen
- Truus Dijkstra
- Anneke Zeinstra
- Margriet Pomper
- Sophie Westenbroek (born 1948)
- Grietje van der Meer (born 1949)

=== Men ===
- Jouke Schaap (1846-1923)
- Pieter Peereboom (1893–1941)
