= Rinsumageast =

Rinsumageast Rinsumageest
- Village
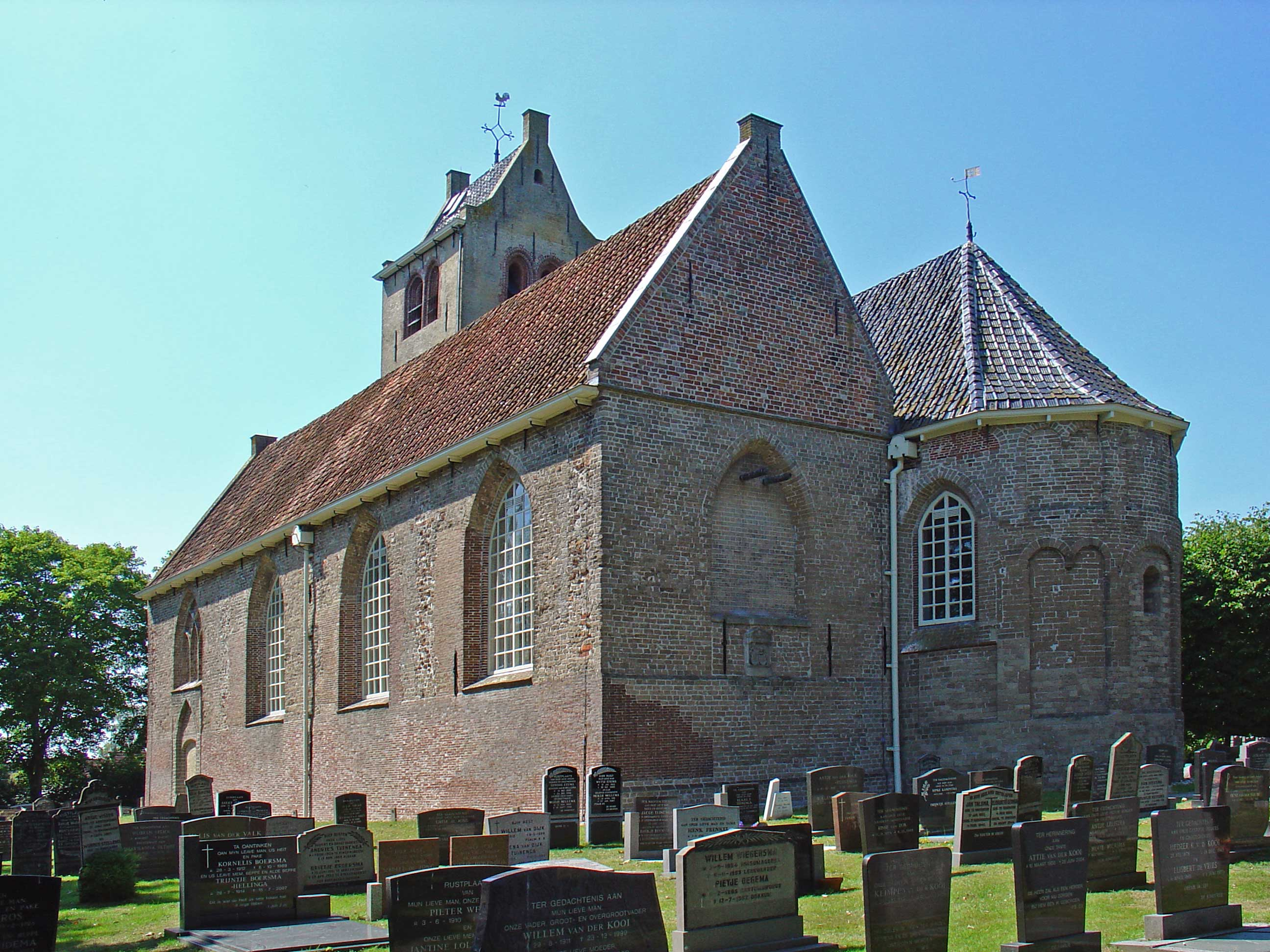
- Saint Alexander’s church

- Flag Coat of arms

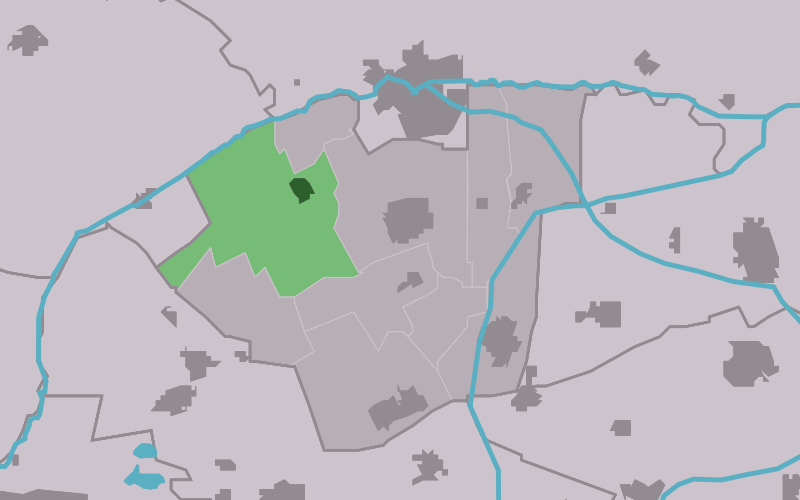
- Location in Dantumadiel municipality

- Location in the Netherlands Rinsumageast (Netherlands)
- Country: Netherlands
- Province: Friesland
- Municipality: Dantumadiel

Population (2017)
  - Total: 965
- Time zone: UTC+1 (CET)
  - Summer (DST): UTC+2 (CEST)
- Website: Official

Rinsumageast (Dutch: Rinsumageest) is a village in the Dantumadiel municipality of Friesland, the Netherlands. It had a population of around 965 in 2017.

The village is locally called De Geest (Dutch) or De Geast (West Frisian).

== History ==
The modern village of Rinsumageast has its origins on the sand ridge in the northwestern edge of the Dokkumer Wouden. It is possible that the place originated on an artificial dwelling mound, an so called terp in the clay soil area within the village area, there were several terpen there and in the vicinity. In a 12th century copy of documents from 825 and 944, the place Ringesheim was indicated in this area. In the 12th century there is place that was called Rynsegum. Around 1100 a church was built on the sand ridge, about 500 meters from two terpen.

A village developed on the sand ridge, which is referred to in the 13th century as Ringesimagast. In 1333 it is mentioned as Ghaest, in 1421 as Renismagaest and in 1533 as Rensymagheest. In the 16th and 17th century, the spelling Rensymageest is most commonly used, also in West Frisian. The village is then the main place of the grietenij Dantumadiel. There were also four major states, the Juwsmastate, Melkamastate, Tjaardastate and the Eysingastate. The stately home of the Juwsmastate was the first of these states to be demolished. The Tjaardastate was a castle and was the last to be demolished, in 1834. This castle stood just south of the village church.

Just north of the village there was a terp on top of the monastery Klaarkamp. This monastery grew into one of the largest in Friesland. From 1593 to 1880, Rinsumageast was the capital of the Grietenij and then the municipality of Dantumadiel with the town hall situated in the village. In 1881 Murmerwoude became the administrative center with a new town hall there. The village of Rinsumageast developed from the 17th century along the water De Moark and the almost parallel boat / barge-canal.

Since the 19th century the place has been called Rinsumageest, until 2009 it was also the official name of the village. In modern West Frisian it is Rinsumageast. In 2008 the municipality Dantumadiel decided that it was going the replace all the official Dutch names within the municipality with the West Frisian names, meaning that Rinsumageast was from 2009 the official name for the village.

== Notable buildings ==
- The Protestant church of Rinsumageast
- De Klaarkampstermeermolen
