= Jeltje Haanstra =

Dutch speed skater

- Haanstra in c. 1950

Personal information
- Nationality: Dutch
- Born: 1932 or 1933

Sport
- Sport: Speed skating

Jeltje Haanstra (born 1932 or 1933) was a Dutch kortebaan speed skater from Katlijk.

As a girl she became champion of Friesland in 1948.

She won many competitions between 1948 and 1954. In the winter of 1950–51 she had a muscle injury and couldn’t compete at several competitions. In January 1953 she couldn’t finish a competition due to a leg injury.

Haanstra studied at U.L.O.
