= Klaarkampstermeermolen =

Polder windmill in Rinsumageast, Friesland, the Netherlands

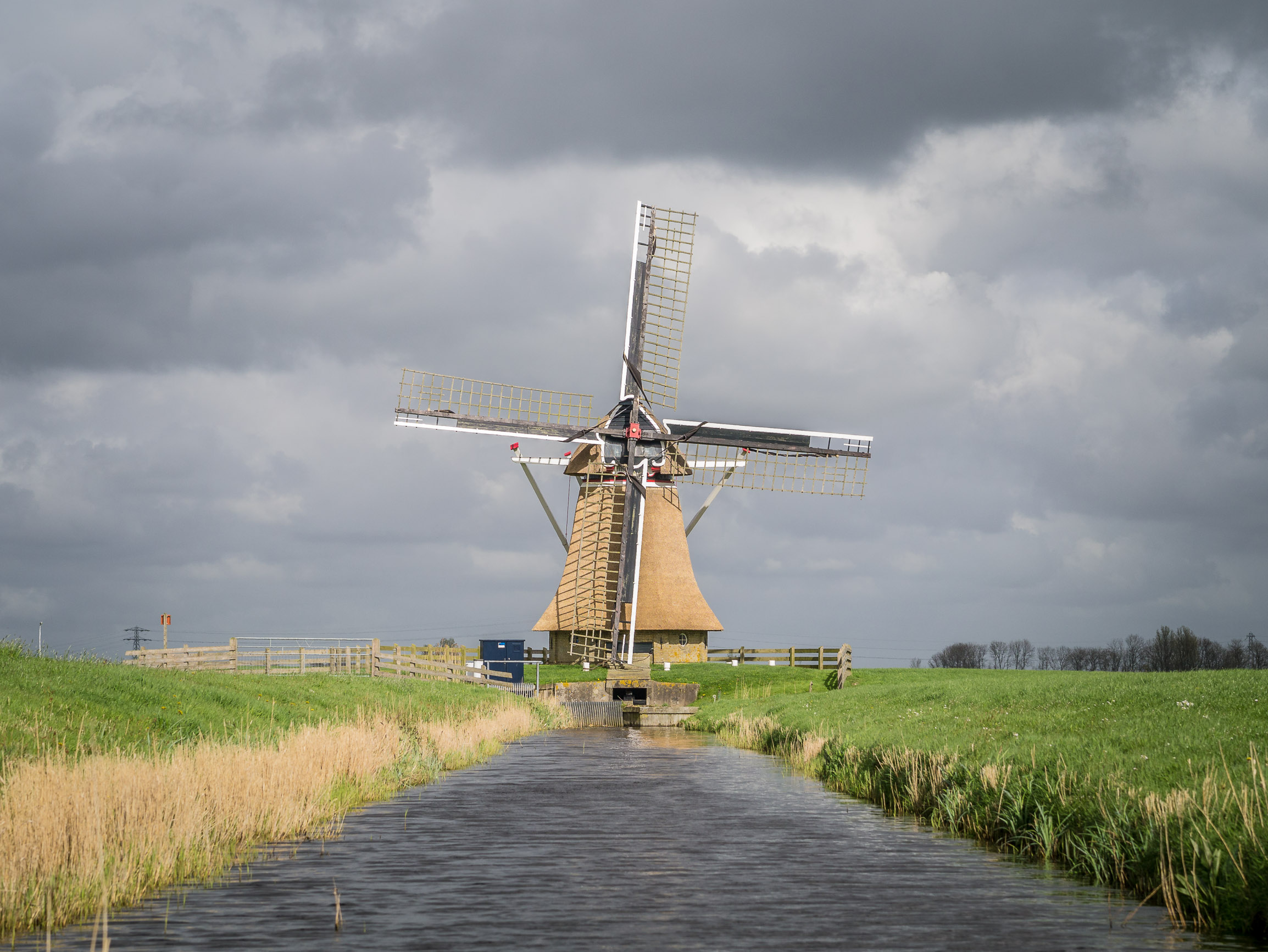
- The Klaarkampstermeermolen, June 2012.

Origin
- Mill name: Klaarkampstermeermolen
- Mill location: Rinsumageast, near Trekwei 11, 9105 AV
- Coordinates: 53°18′18″N 5°56′16″E
- Operator(s): Staatsbosbeheer region Friesland North
- Year built: 1893

Information
- Purpose: Drainage mill
- Type: Smock mill
- Storeys: Two storey smock
- Base storeys: One storey base
- Smock sides: Eight sides
- No. of sails: Four sails
- Type of sails: Common sails
- Windshaft: Cast iron
- Winding: Tailpole and winch
- Type of pump: Archimedes screw

The Klaarkampstermeermolen or Klaarkampstermolen is a polder windmill in Rinsumageast, Friesland, the Netherlands. Built in 1862 the smock mill was relocated to its current position in 1893 and has been restored several times. Worked by volunteers it still drains the Klaarkampstermeer as of 2022. The mill is listed as a Rijksmonument since 1970 and can be visited by appointment.

== History ==
De Klaarkampstermeermolen was originally built in 1862 at the Juckemavaart canal. It was moved to its current site in 1893 to drain the 210 pondemaat (77 ha; 190 acres) Klaarkampstermeer. The mill was restored in 1975 and an electric pump was installed. During a further restoration in 1991 the wooden windshaft was replaced by a cast iron one, cast by Gieterij Hardinxveld of Hardinxveld-Giessendam, South Holland. A further restoration was undertaken in 2009. The mill is listed as a Rijksmonument, №11695.

== Description ==
De Klaarkampstermeermolen is a grondzeiler, the mill can be set to the wind from the ground: as the sails almost touch the ground no stage is needed. It is a two-storey smock mill on a single-storey brick base. The mill is set to the wind by tailpole and winch. The smock and cap are thatched. The common sailssit on wings with a 16.14 metres (52 ft 11 in) span.

The windshaft carries the 47 cogs brake wheel that drives the wallower (24 cogs) at the top of the upright shaft that has two crown wheels at the bottom end called the upper and the lower crown wheel. The upper crown wheel has 35 cogs and drives an Archimedes' screw. The lower crown wheel, which has 34 cogs is carried on the axle of an Archimedes' screw that drains the Klaarkampstermeer polder. The axle of the screw is 37 centimetres (1 ft 3 in) diameter and 5.15 metres (16 ft 11 in) long. The 1.07 metres (3 ft 6 in) diameter screw is inclined at 25.7° and each revolution lifts 293 litres (64 imp gal) of water.

== Visiting ==
As per 2020 the Klaarkampstermeermolen was open to the public by appointment and on the first Saturday morning of each month.
