= Anke Beenen =

Dutch speedskater (1853–1886)

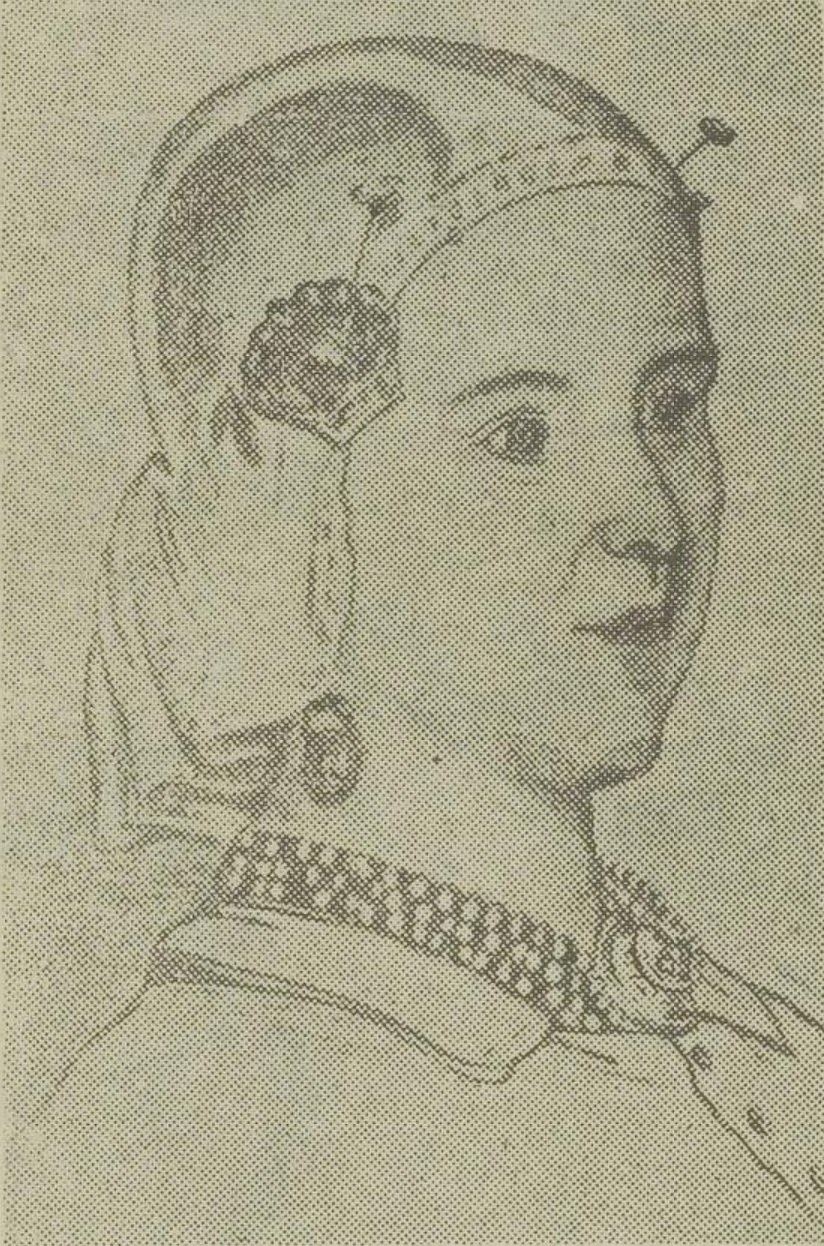

Personal information
- Born: 18 January 1853 Langezwaag Netherlands
- Died: 5 September 1886 (aged 33) Langezwaag Netherlands

Sport
- Sport: speed skating
- Event: short track
- Turned pro: 1870
- Retired: 1881

Anke Bonnes Beenen (18 January 1853 – 5 September 1886), Langezwaag, Netherlands, was a Dutch short track speed skater. Beenen was among notable Dutch woman speed skater in second half of nineteenth century. She became well known from pair speed skating competitions with Jouke Schaap, winning thousand guilders in prize money.

== Career ==
When Beenen was 16 years old, she started skating in her hometown Langezwaag. It was noted by her father that she skated fast. She registered together with her brothers, Hendrik and Jan, for a major competition in Groningen in the winter of 1870. Beenen won the race with f 150 and a gold medal. Jouke Schaap (1846–1923) won the men's competition that same day. They agreed to start competing together in pair speed skating competitions.

Schaap en Beenen's first competition together was on 3 January 1871 at the Munnikspetten in Heerenveen, and it was their breakthrough. They won first prize and fl. 150. They would compete together for about ten years until 1881, and won many prizes; not only in Friesland but also in North Holland, South Holland and Groningen. Especially in their first winter of 1870–71 they were very successful, and won among others also the second prize in Bolsward and the first prize in Amsterdam (31 January 1871, f 150).

Beenen also continued to win prizes individually. She competed in the week she was going to marry on 3 February 1880 in Grouw and shortly after her marriage on 18 January 1881 in Hardegarijp. That winter of 1880–81 was the last winter she took part in competitions.

Speedskating shorttrack competitions
Date	Place	Competition	Placement/Prize
3 January 1871	Heerenveen	Pairs – with Jouke Schaap	1st – f150
4 January 1871	Groningen	Pairs – with Jouke Schaap	1st – f60
13 January 1871	Bolsward	Pairs – with Jouke Schaap	2nd
26 January 1871	Tjallebird	Pairs – with Jouke Schaap	1st – f50
1 February 1871	Amsterdam	Pairs – with Jouke Schaap	1st – f150
8 February 1873	Akkrum	Individual	2nd
17 January 1876	Harlingen	Pairs – with Jouke Schaap	2nd – f60
18 January 1876	Heerenveen	Skating holding a stick together (schaatsen aan de stok) – w Jouke Schaap and Murk Speerstra	1st – f150
10 January 1879	Drachten	Pairs	? – f10
24 January 1879	Oosterzee	Pairs	1st – f60
30 January 1879	Sloten	Individual	1st – f50
31 January 1879	Amsterdam	Pairs	1st – f150
3 February 1879	Jellum	Individual	1st – f40
4 February 1879	Oudkerk	Individual	1st – f50
6 December 1879	Drachten	Pairs	? – f10
21 December 1879	Groningen	Pairs	? – f30
30 January 1880	Drachten	Individual	1st – f50
31 January 1880	Bolsward	Individual	1st – f50
3 February 1880	Grou	Individual	1st – f50
9 February 1880	Workum	Individual	1st – f40
24 January 1881	Hardegarijp	Individual	2nd

== Popularity ==
Around 1880 a painting of Beenen and Jouke Schaap (by known painter Janus Poustma) was displayed at a shop window in Gorredijk. On 22 December 1879 her speed skating club "Thialf" paid attention celebrated her silver anniversary by building a large gate in front of the house of the mayor of Schoterland, de Blocq van Scheltinga, on the Heideburen street in Heerenveen. On top were placed three figures: in the middle ice god Thialf and next to him Beenen and Jouke Schaap. Later, this representation was on display for many years in the ice tent of the Thialf ice rink. The wooden statue of Anke Beenen en Jouke Schaap was at the ice stadium Thialf for years until Thialf was rebuilt in 1926.

On 14 December 1974, a newspaper for the Leeuwarden and surroundings wrote an article about her life.

== Personal life ==
Beenen was born in Langezwaag. She married boatman Johannes Sijtzes Krist on 7 February 1880. It is said that she had a tough marriage, and she stopped with speed skating. They had four children: Bonne, Korneliske, Johanna and Geertje. Bonne drowned in Rotterdam in 1935. Beenen died young on 5 September 1886, aged 33. After her death Johannes Sijtzes Krist married again and lived in Leeuwarden.
