= Protestant church of Rinsumageast =

Church in Rinsumageast, Netherlands

Coordinates: 53°17′46″N 5°56′34″E

Protestant church of Rinsumageast Saint Alexander’s church
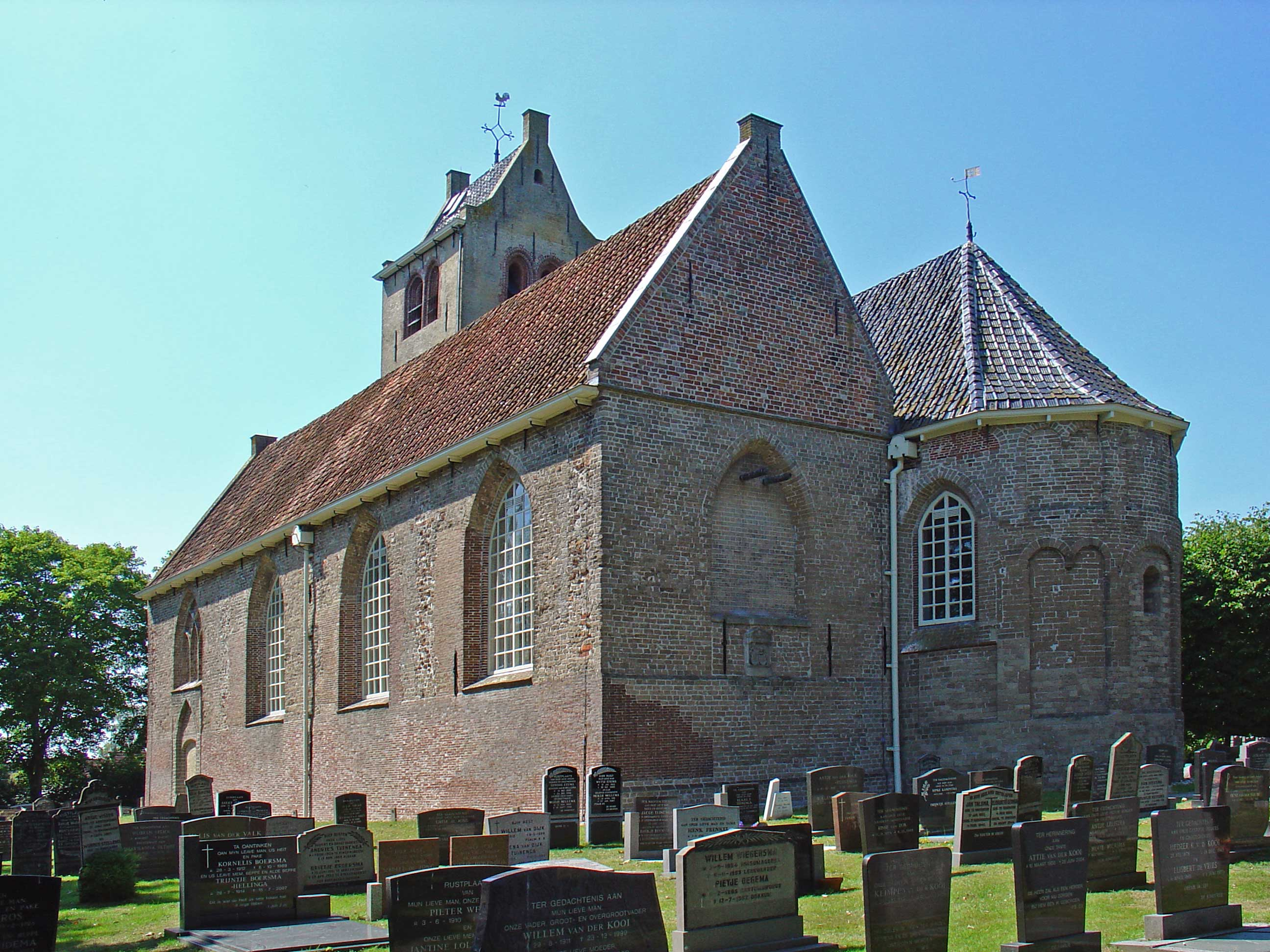
- Church of Rinsumageast
- Protestant church of Rinsumageast; Saint Alexander’s church

History
- Dedication: Before the Reformation, to Saint Alexander

Specifications
- Materials: Tuffstone

The Protestant church of Rinsumageast or Saint Alexander’s church is a religious building in Rinsumageast, Netherlands, one of the many medieval churches in Friesland.

The construction of the for the most part tuffstone Romanesque church started in the 11th century. The semicircular choir was built in the 12th century followed by the nave and the tower dates from the 13th century. Under the choir is a crypt, uniek for the north of the Nederlands. The church was enlarged in ca. 1525 with the replacement of the southern aisle by a new, Gothic one, dominantly of brick. The monumental Pipe organ was built in 1892 by Bakker & Timmenga.

The church is located on the Juckemaweg 3 and was once a Roman Catholic church dedicated to Saint Alexander but became a Protestant church after the Protestant Reformation. It is listed as a Rijksmonument, number 11691 and is rated with a very high historical value.
