= Annie van der Meer =

Dutch speed skater

Personal information
- Born: 10 August 1928 Wergea, Netherlands
- Died: 30 May 2004 (aged 75) Leeuwarden, Netherlands

Sport
- Country: Netherlands
- Sport: Speed skating (kortebaanschaatsen)

Annie van der Steeg-Van der Meer (10 August 1928 — 30 May 2004) was a Dutch kortebaan speed skater, with her best results in the 1950s. During her career she won a total of 75 prizes. She became twice Frisian champion and won the silver medal at the national championships.

== Career ==
She already did speed skating when she was young, but never competed in girls’ competitions. She started competing at the serious competitions. After a short while she started winning prizes. However, at a competition at IJsbrechtum she crashed. She rode against a rope she didn’t saw due to the mist. She had a concussion and couldn’t compete at other races that winter. She returned on the ice in the winter of 1948-49. She became the Frisian kortebaan champion in the winter of 1950-51 in Appingedam. She beat Aaltje Terpstra, a rider who won almost all competitions in Drenthe and Groningen. A special poem was dedicated to her; published in the newspaper. At the 1955 and 1956 national championships she won the silver.

In the winter of 1954-55 she also started competing in long track speed skating. At the national championships in Zutphen she finished successfully 5th and won the silver medal in a 500 metres time of 65.5. At the 1956 Frysian championships.

After her career she became a trainer at “IJsvogels” in Surhuisterveen; also her children were skating there.

== Personal ==
Van der Meer was born in Wergea. She lived on a farm in Tjalhuizum between Bolsward and Sneek. Van der Meer married competitive sailor Siep van der Steeg in 1956. As present from her fellow skaters she received a tobacco jar. One of the 45 made by Tichelaar’s, chosen to be designed by kortebaan female speed skaters. The tobacco jars have since become valuable collectors' objects and museum pieces. Van der Meer later donated her piece to The Frisian Maritime Museum in Sneek.

Together with Siep she lived in Leeuwarden. Annie and Siep had three children, one son Jan en 2 daughters; Jellie and Froukje. Daughter Jellie also skated as a semi professional. Van der Meer died in Leeuwarden on 30 May 2004.
