= Protestant church of Twijzel =

Church in Twijzel, Netherlands

Protestant church of Twijzel Saint Peter's church
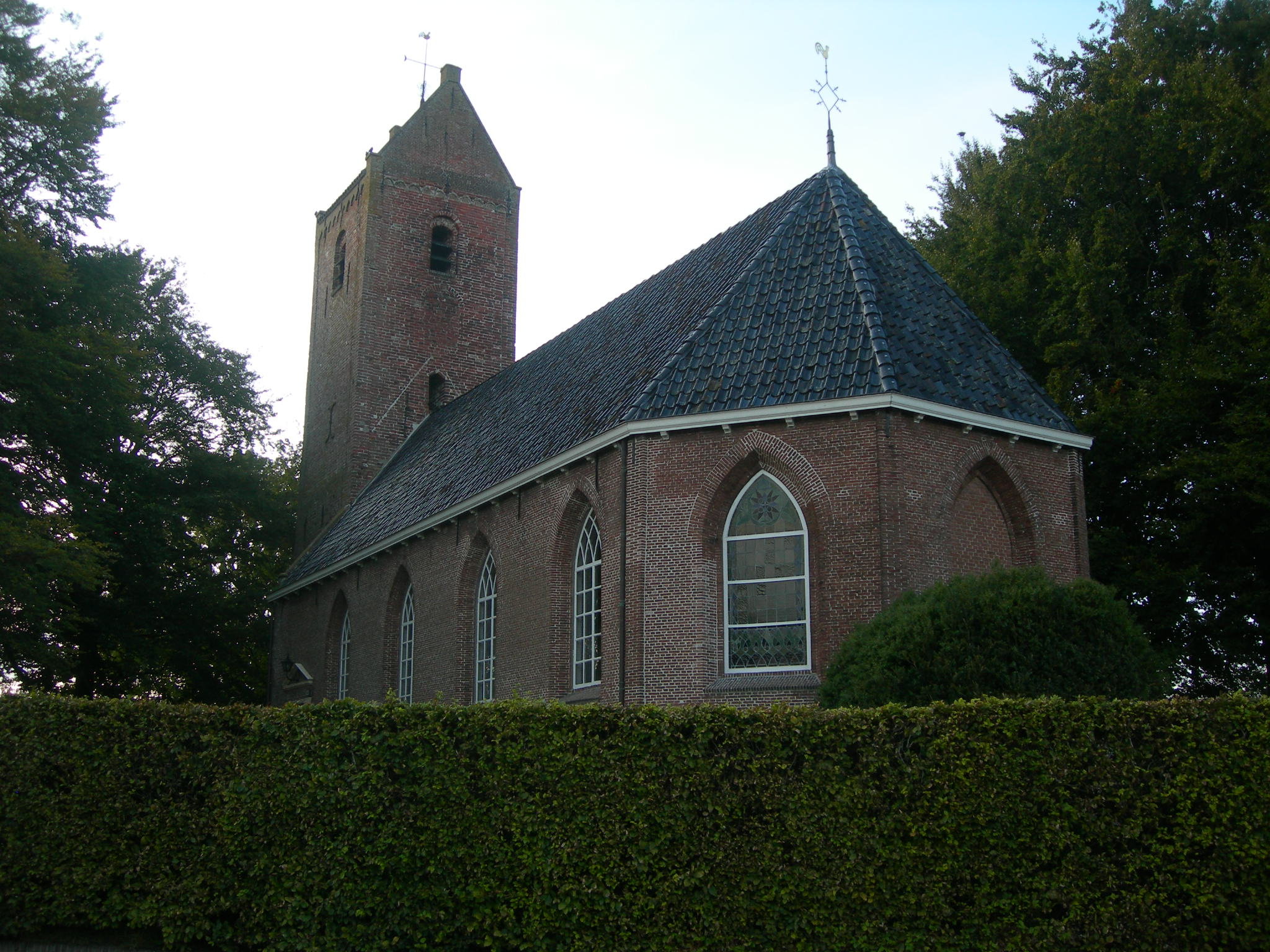
- Church of Twijzel
- Protestant church of Twijzel; Saint Peter's church
- 53.2398°N 6.1034°E

History
- Dedication: before the reformation Saint Peter

Specifications
- Materials: Brick

The Protestant church of Twijzel or Saint Peter's church is a religious building in Twijzel, Friesland, in the Netherlands. The current church was built in 1692 out of brick and has a triple closed choir. The church is built against the medieval tower that dates from the 13th century. On top of the tower is a gable roof which was placed in 1787. The Pipe organ was built in 1905 by Bakker & Timmenga from Leeuwarden. It was originally a Roman Catholic church, becoming a Protestant church after the Protestant Reformation. The building is located on Tsjerkebuorren 15. and is listed as a Rijksmonument, number 7054 and is rated with a very high historical value.
