= Damwâld =

- Village
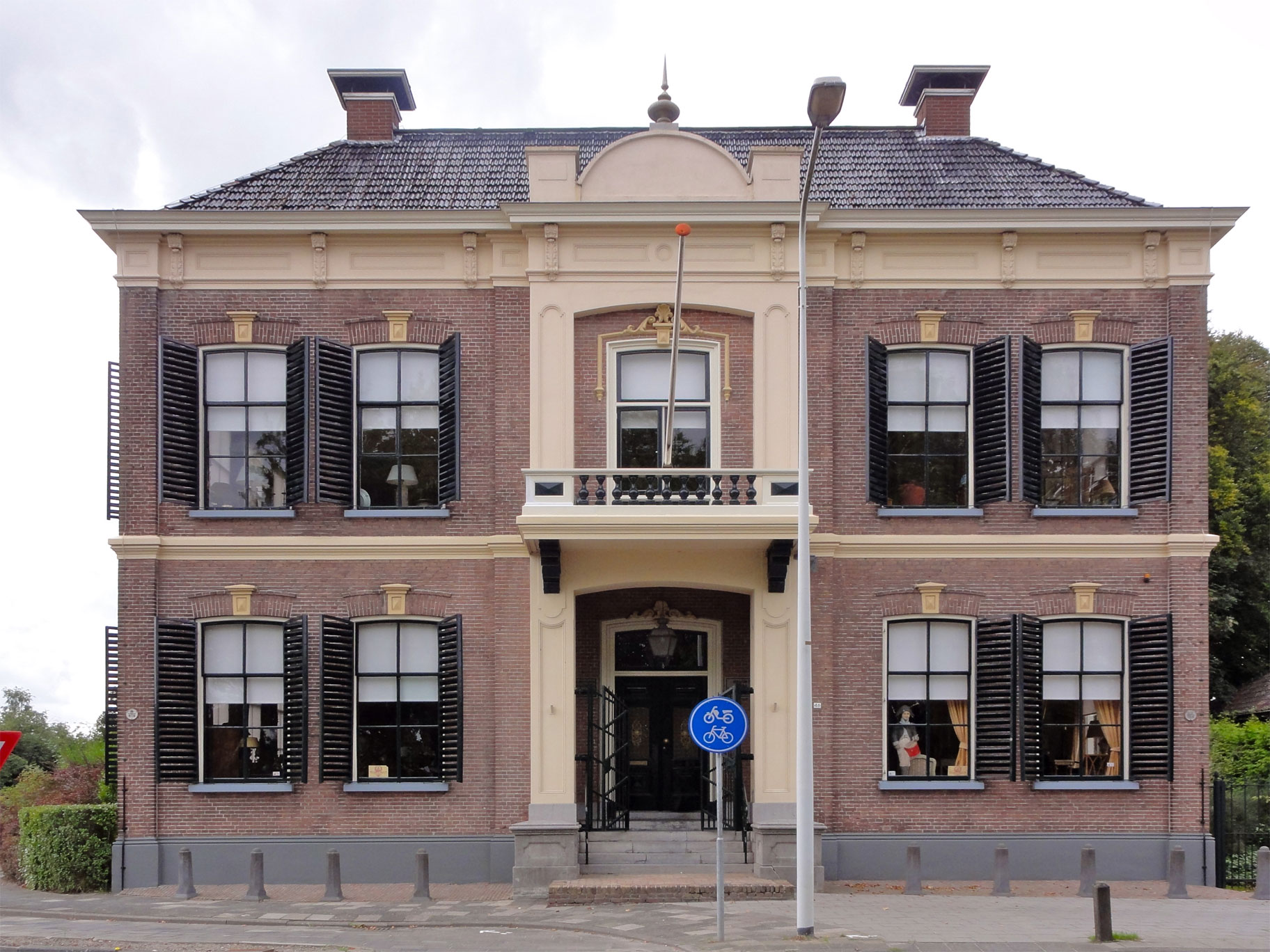
- Former town hall

- Flag
- Nickname: Cichorei City
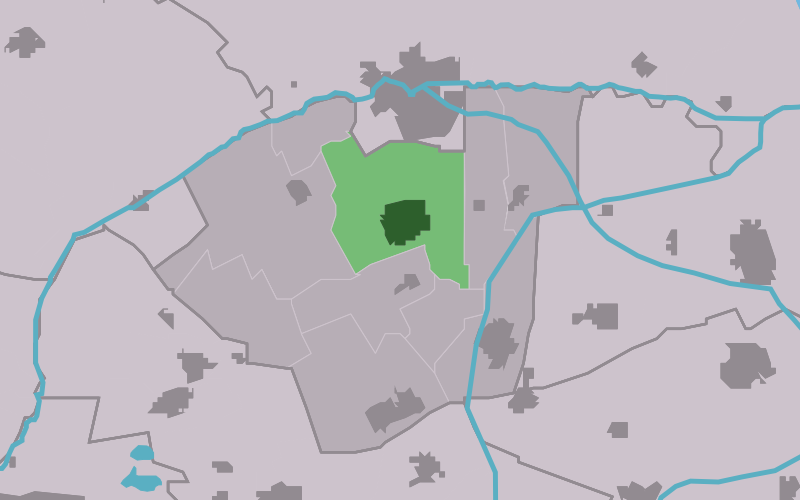
- Location in Dantumadiel municipality

- Location in the Netherlands Damwâld (Netherlands)
- Coordinates: 53°17′N 6°00′E
- Country: Netherlands
- Province: Friesland
- Municipality: Dantumadiel

Population (2020)
  - Total: 5,630
- Demonym: Damwâldster
- Time zone: UTC+1 (CET)
  - Summer (DST): UTC+2 (CEST)
- Postal code: 9104
- Website: Official

Damwâld (Dutch: Damwoude, official until 2009) is a village in the Dantumadiel municipality of Friesland, in the Netherlands. In 2020 it had 5630 citizens. This number of citizens makes Damwâld the largest village in the municipality of Dantumadiel.

== History ==
The present day village of Damwâld is a merged place of three older villages, merged in 1971. The three villages were; Dantumawoude (Dantumawâld), Akkerwoude (Ikkerwâld) and Murmerwoude (Moarrewâld). But it was in the 19th century that the villages started really growing together already. From the second half of that century the buildings strongly densified and in 1880 along the Murmerlaan (later named the Haadwei) the first tram track of Friesland was opened, a horse track.

The municipality decided to move the town hall to Murmerwoude. Up until 1881 this was located in the village of Rinsumageast. The move was a bit surprising considering the fact that Murmerwoude was the smallest of the three villages and Dantumawoude which the municipality is named after had a bit of higher status with a history of noble stone house (stins) and the village of De Westereen having the biggest population. In that village al lot of people where claiming that's the reason why the town hall should have moved to there. But it never happened. The town hall in Murmerwoude had been renovated a number of times but eventually, around 1970, the municipality decided that the town hall will be moved to stately stins of Rinsmastate in Driezum.

The move meant that a lot of the services and shops in the three villages could have been in doubt without further steps been taken. Losing the town hall could mean losing the center place-function. That and a practical reasons with the fact that the three villages even more blended together since the new housing constructions of the 1960s. And some of the houses being in one villages while others in another while they there in a row behind each other. Making it a bit confusion for the everyday people and people like the mailman. To eventually solve this problem, the local government fused the three small towns into one, in 1971, a small year before the new town hall in Driezum came into use. Giving the history the older issues probably played in the background as well. But it was until 1999 that the town hall was back in Damwâld, not far from the place where it was located in Murmerwoude.

A lot of the people from the three villages where themselves against the merger. The people of Akkerwoude especially. It was hotly debated but the council of the municipality decided to continue with the merger. The name of the new town eventually came to be Damwoude, before changing to Damwâld in 2009. The first letter of the Dutch name of each smaller village made up the first three letters of the new name. But also the name was already used historically as a short version of Dantumawoude, dating back from around 1700 and the 19th century. In 1971 there was a plea that all three villages should be named under the new town signs. That was granted, but those signs disappeared slowly over the years. The new town continued to grow and thus retained its center function.

In 2008 the Dantumadiel municipality decided to officially change the Dutch names of the villages into their West Frisian counterparts, changing the village name from Damwoude to Damwâld.

== Gallery ==
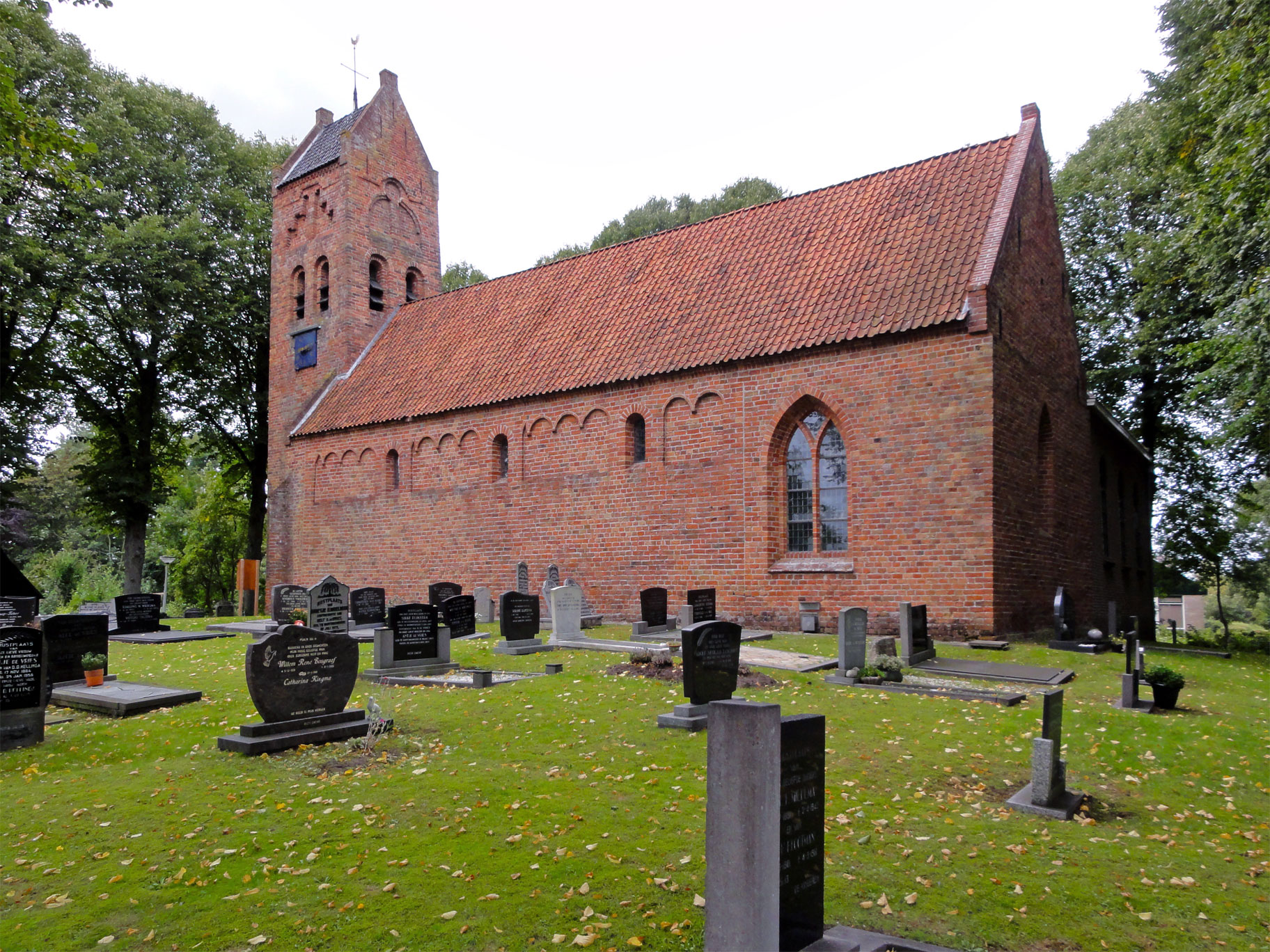
Saint Boniface's church

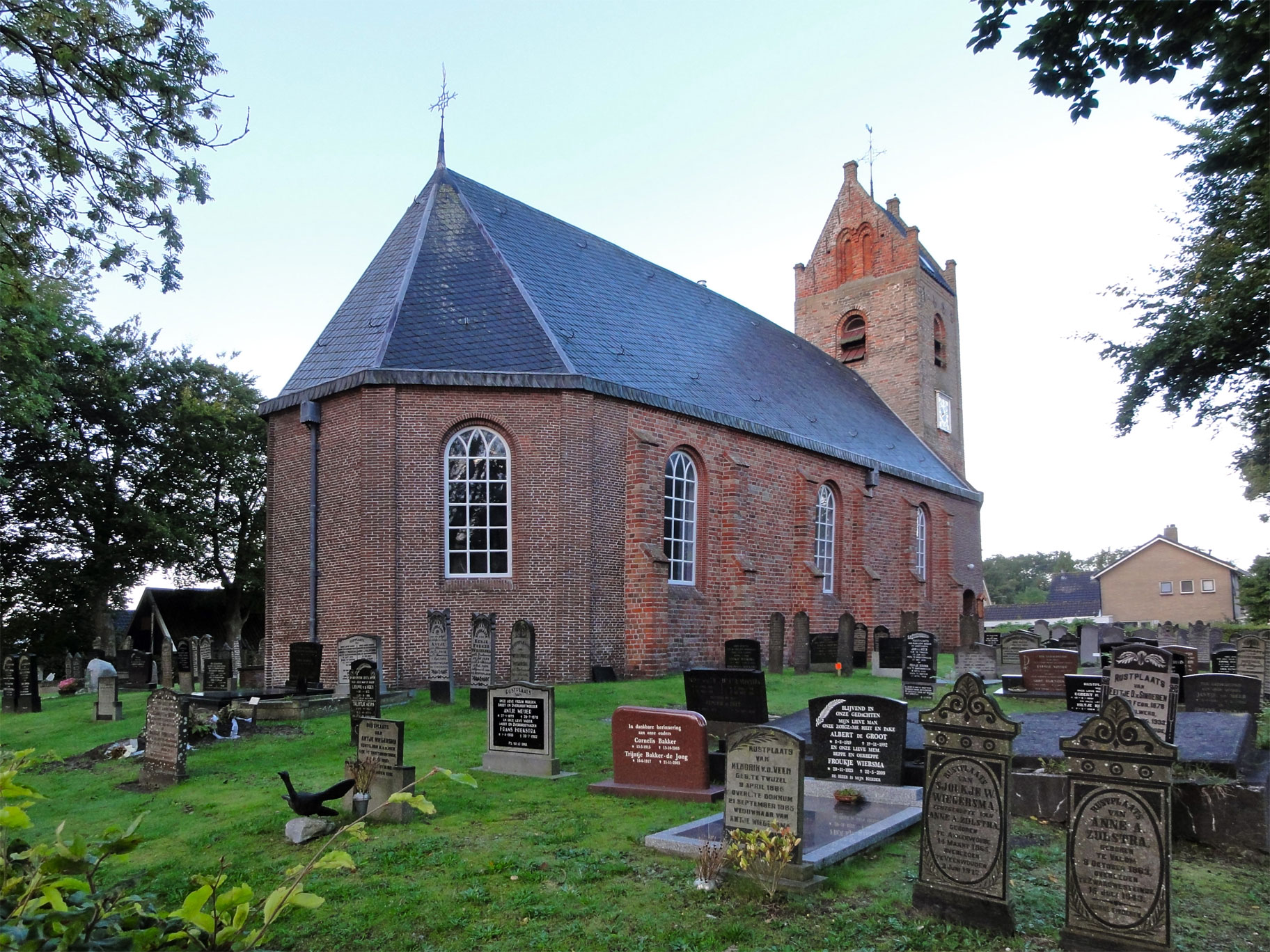
Saint Benedict's church

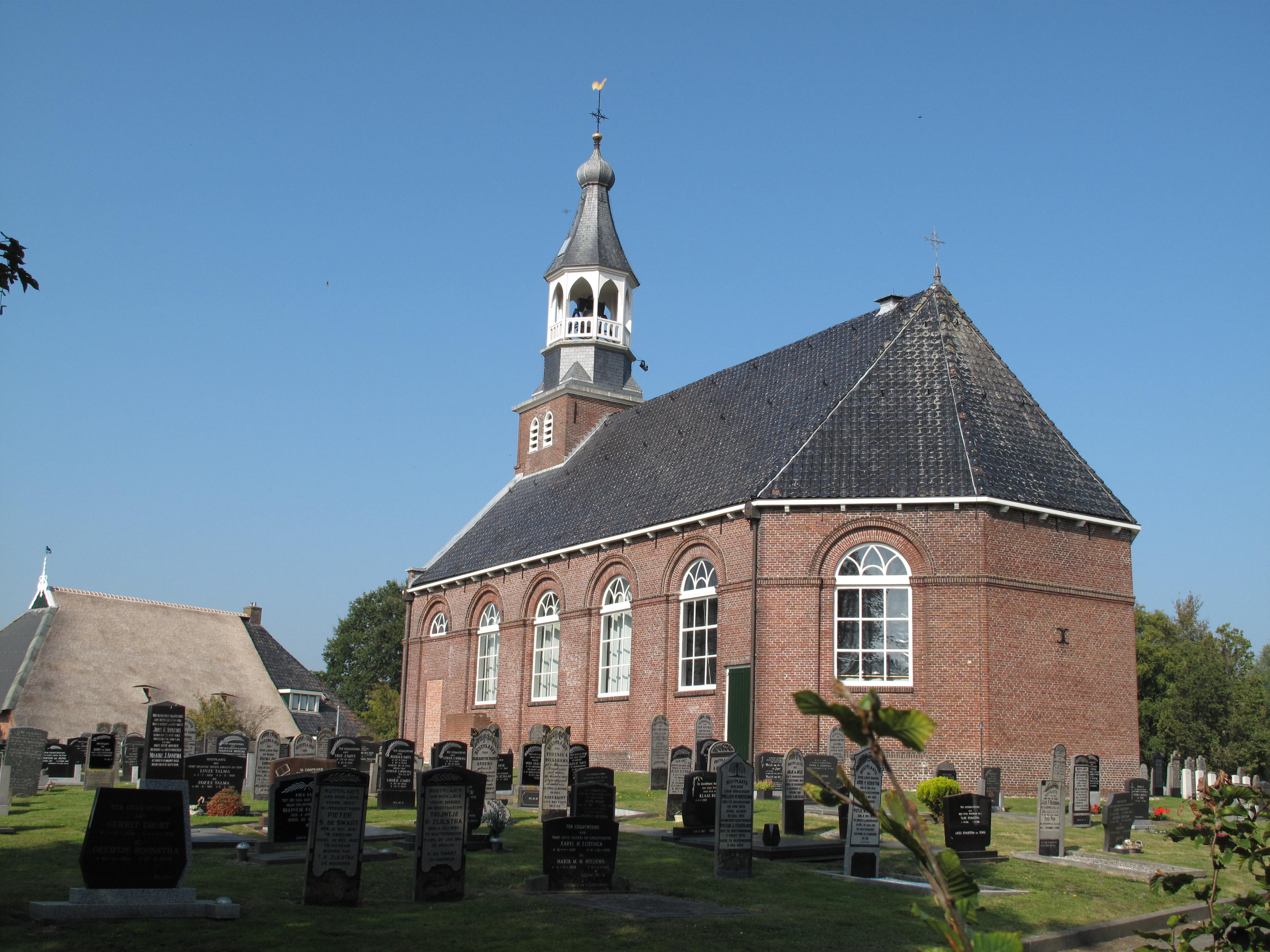
Dutch Reformed Church, located at the Hearewei

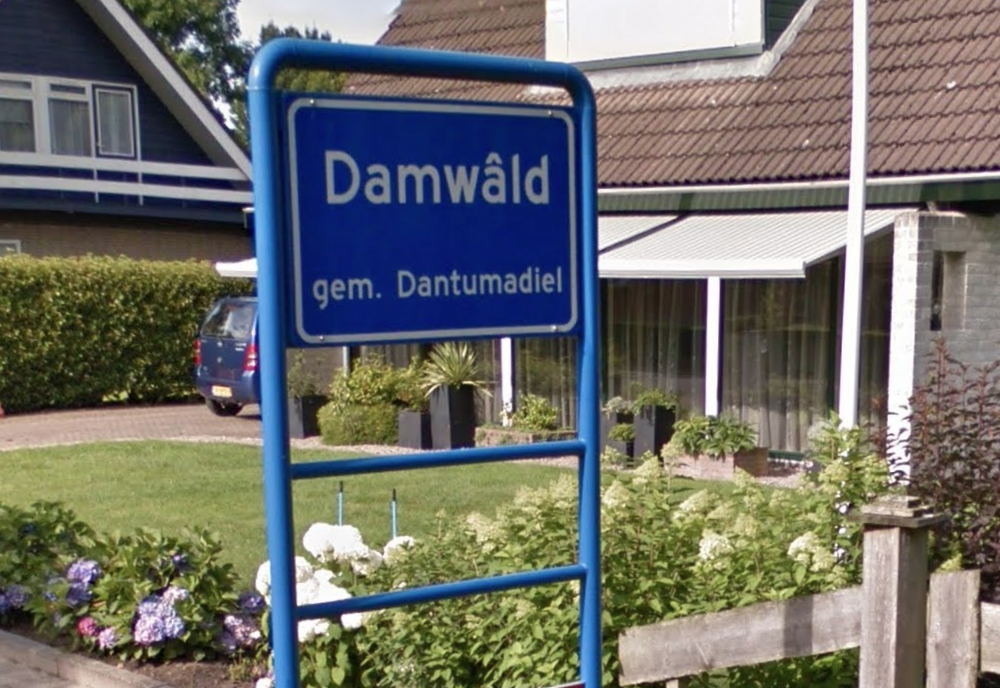
Town entry sign
