= Protestant church of Damwâld-Dantumawâld =

Church in Damwâld-Dantumawâld, Netherlands

Coordinates: 53°17′26″N 6°00′45″E

Protestant church of Damwâld-Dantumawâld Saint Benedict’s church
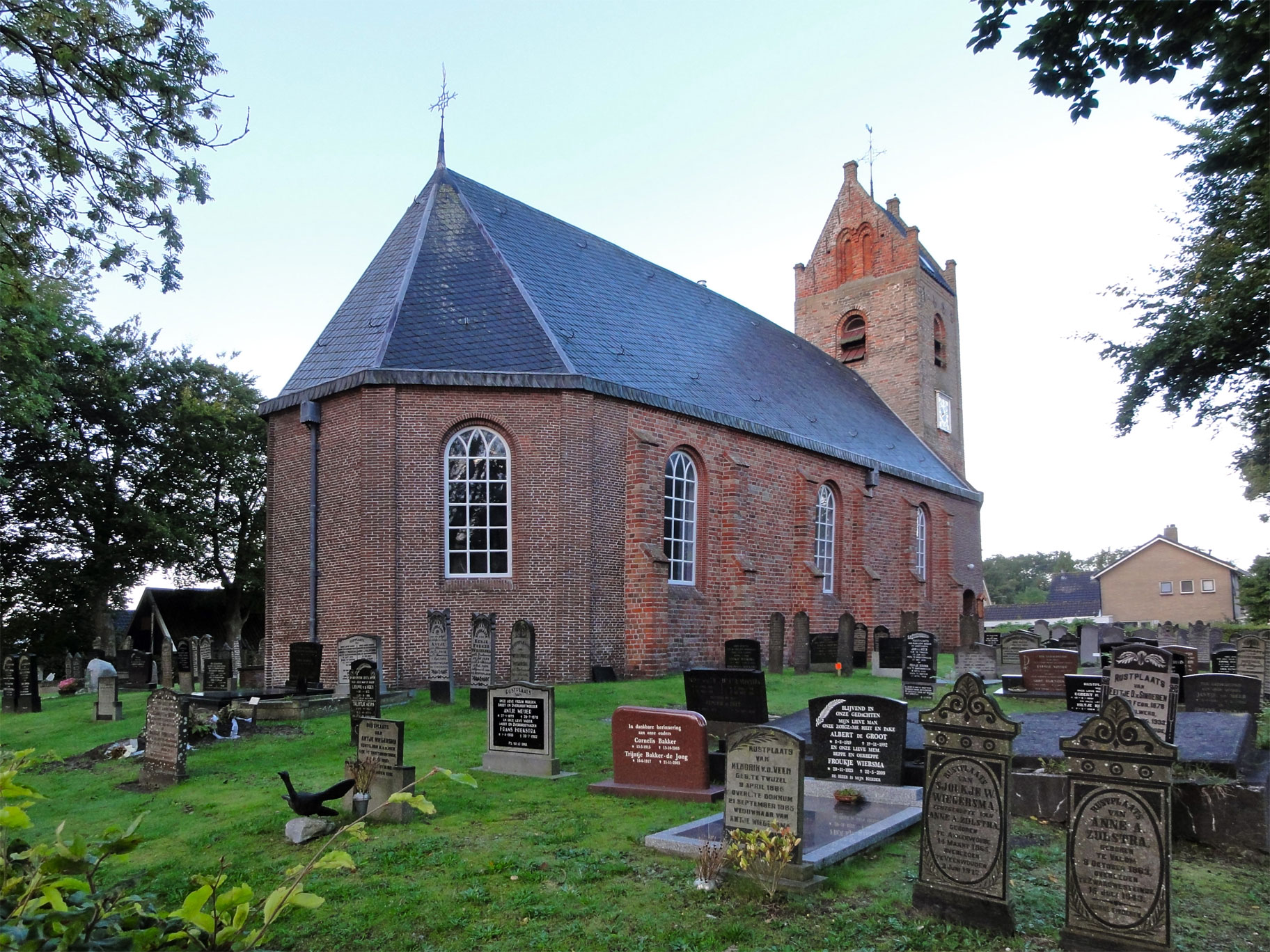
- Church of Damwâld-Dantumawâld
- Protestant church of Damwâld-Dantumawâld; Saint Benedict’s church

History
- Dedication: Before the reformation, to Saint Benedict

Specifications
- Materials: Tuffstone with a brick tower

Logo of the Reformed church of Dantumawâld

The Protestant church of Damwâld-Dantumawâld or Saint Benedict’s church is a religious building in Damwâld-Dantumawâld, one of the medieval churches in Friesland.

The church was built in the 12th century out of Tuffstone. In 1775 the current triple closed choir was built, in it are two large Romanesque windows. The tower dates from the 13th century and is built out of brick. The Pipe organ was built in 1777 by Albertus Antoni Hinsz.

The church is located on the Doniawei 76 and was once a Roman Catholic church dedicated to Saint Boniface but became a Protestant church after the Protestant Reformation. It is listed as a Rijksmonument, number 11681.

== See also ==
- The Protestant church of Damwâld-Moarrewâld
