= Protestant church of Damwâld-Moarrewâld =

Church in Damwâld-Moarrewâld, Netherlands

Coordinates: 53°17′26″N 5°59′49″E

Protestant church of Damwâld-Moarrewâld Saint Boniface’s church
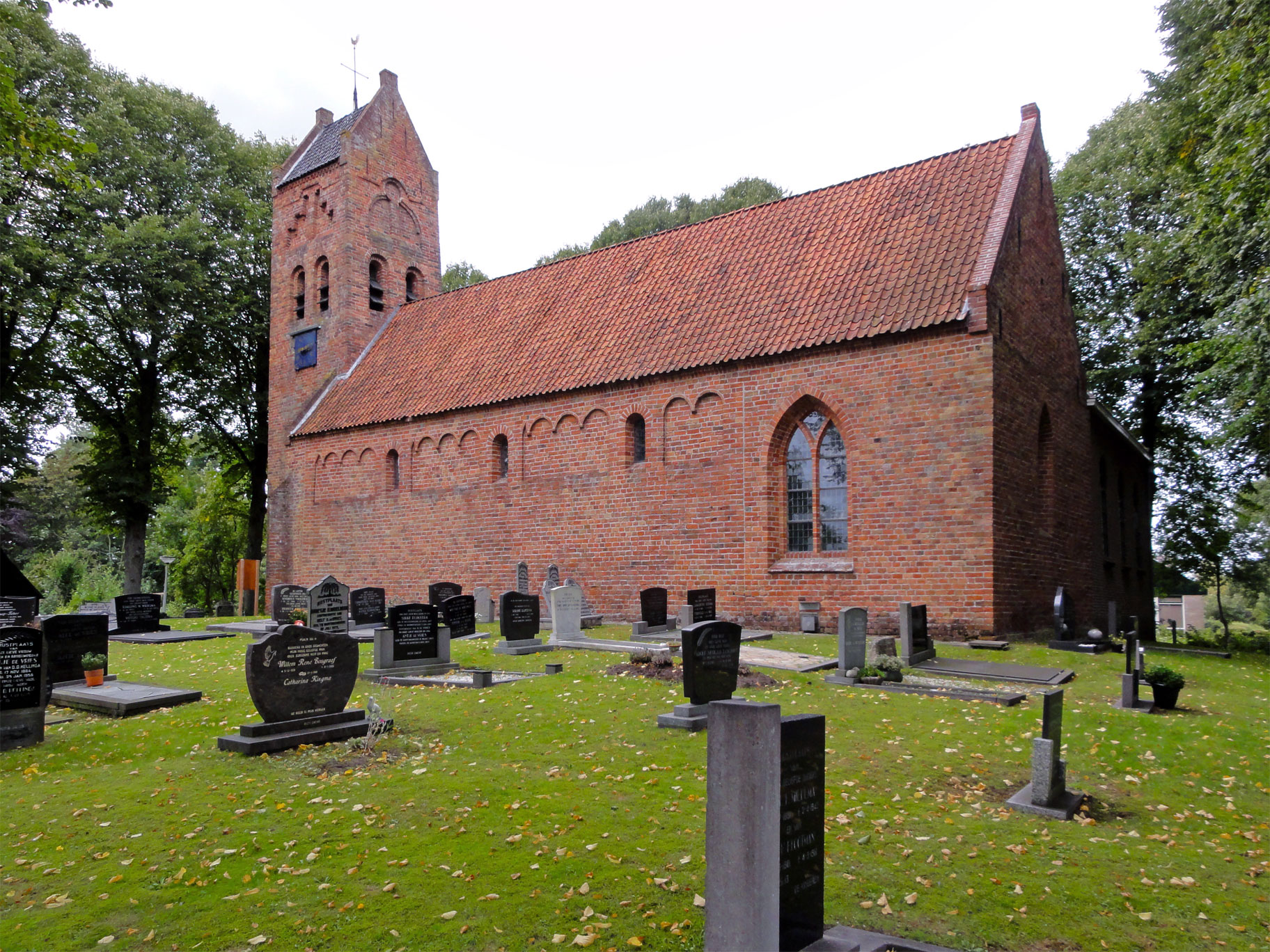
- Church of Damwâld-Moarrewâld
- Protestant church of Damwâld-Moarrewâld; Saint Boniface’s church

History
- Dedication: Before the reformation, to Saint Boniface

Specifications
- Materials: Brick

The Protestant church of Damwâld-Moarrewâld or Saint Boniface’s church is a religious building in Damwâld, one of the medieval churches in Friesland.

It is a Romanesque church built c. 1200 out of red brick with a straight closed choir dating from the early 16th century and a tower from the 13th century. The pipe organ was built in 1895 by Bakker & Timmenga.

The church is located on the Weg 4 and was once a Roman Catholic church dedicated to Saint Boniface but became a Protestant church after the Protestant Reformation. It is listed as a Rijksmonument, number 11675.

== See also ==
- The Protestant church of Damwâld-Dantumawâld
