= Langezwaag =

Langezwaag Langsweagen
- Village
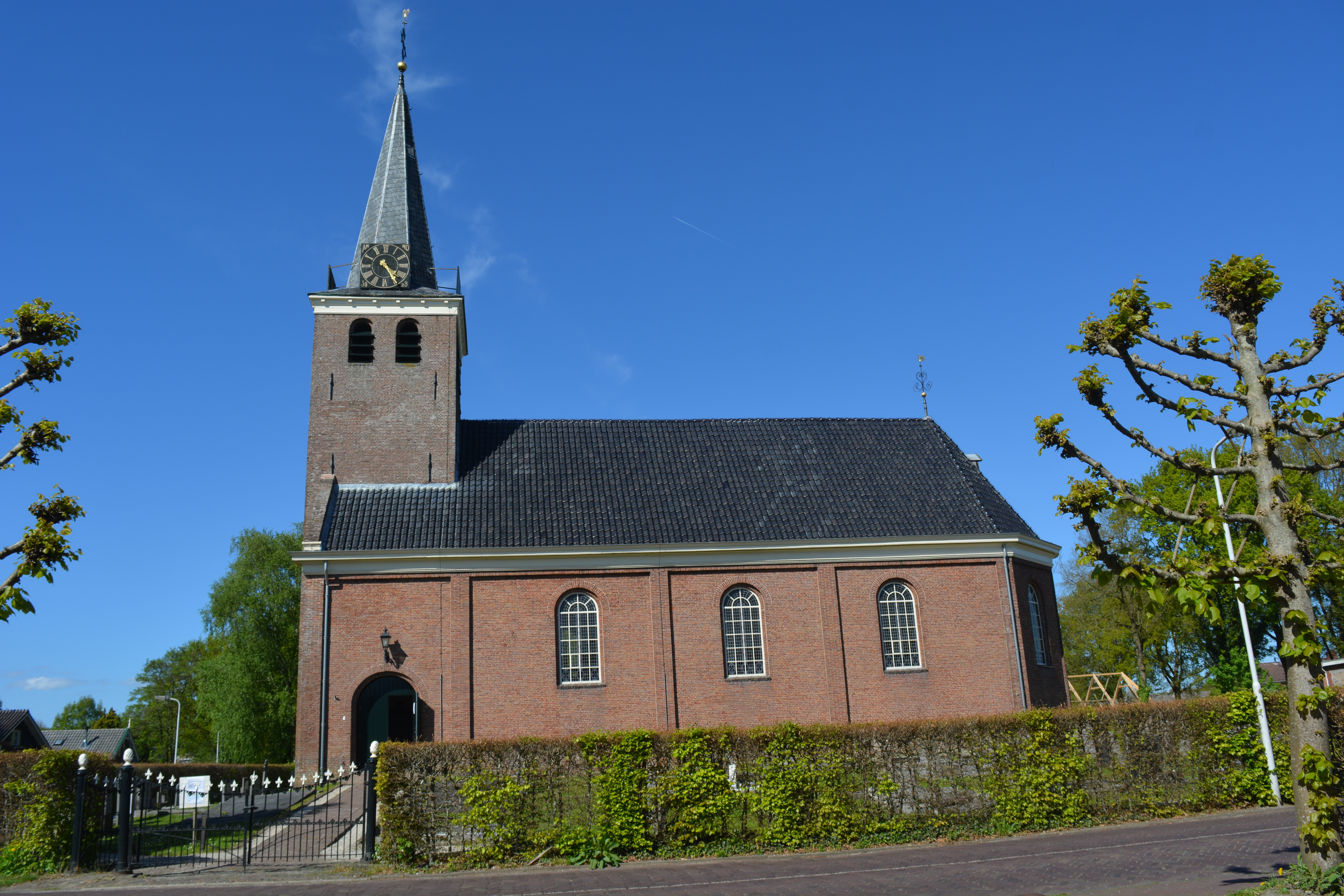
- Langezwaag church

- Coat of arms

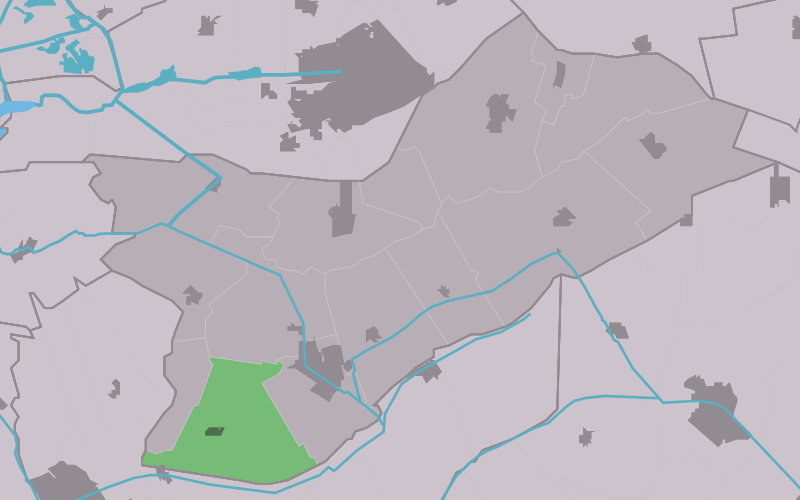
- Location in Opsterland municipality

- Location in the Netherlands Langezwaag (Netherlands)
- Country: Netherlands
- Province: Friesland
- Municipality: Opsterland

Area
  - Total: 13.17 km^{2} (5.08 sq mi)
- Elevation: 0.5 m (1.6 ft)

Population (2021)
  - Total: 1,050
  - Density: 79.7/km^{2} (206/sq mi)
- Time zone: UTC+1 (CET)
  - Summer (DST): UTC+2 (CEST)
- Postal code: 8404
- Dialing code: 0513

Langezwaag (West Frisian: Langsweagen) is a village in the municipality of Opsterland in the east of Friesland, the Netherlands. It had a population of around 1,365 in January 2017.

== History ==
The village was first mentioned in 1315 as Utresuagh, and means "long meadow with caddle". Lange (long) has been added to distinguish from Kortezwaag. Kortezwaag was annexed by Gorredijk in 1962 and is now a neighbourhood. The Dutch Reformed church was built in 1781 as a replacement of a medieval church.

Langezwaag was home to 956 people in 1840.

== Gallery ==
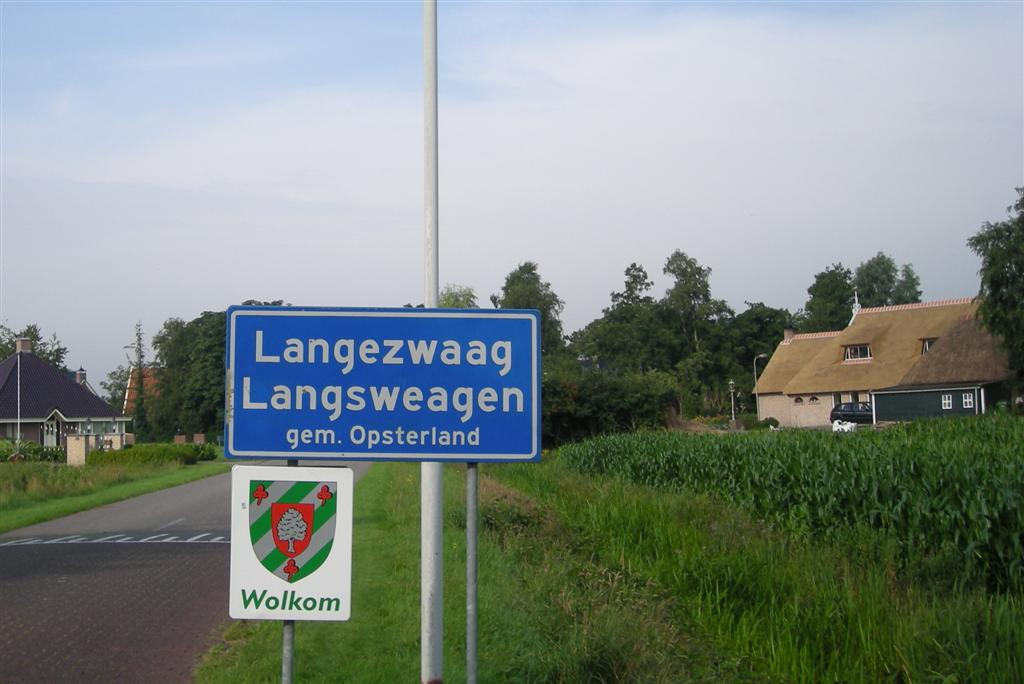
Welcome to Langezwaag

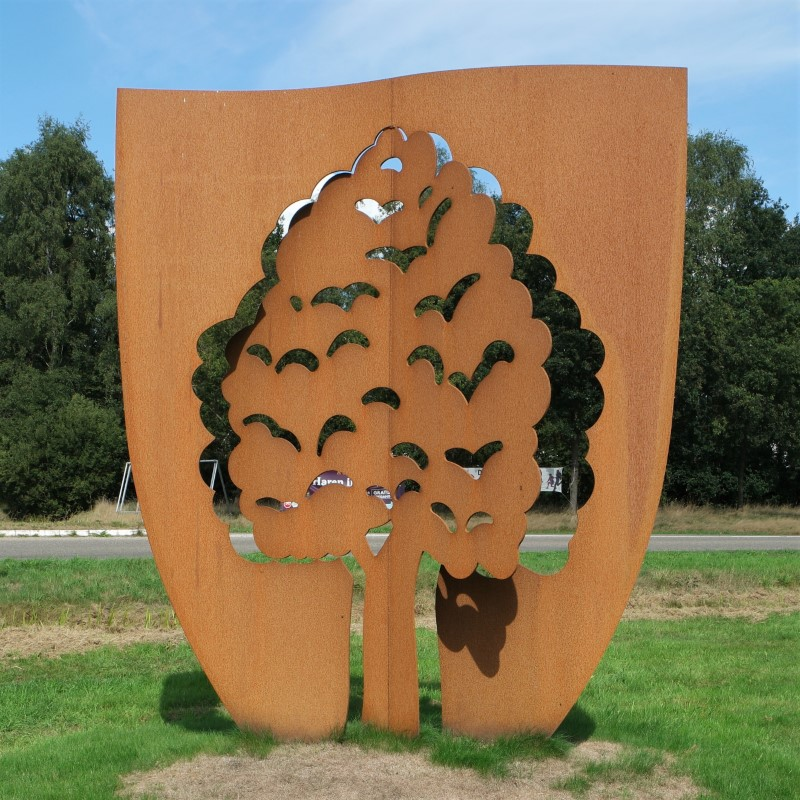
The tree of Langezwaag
