= Akkerwoude =

Akkerwoude Ikkerwâld
- Former village
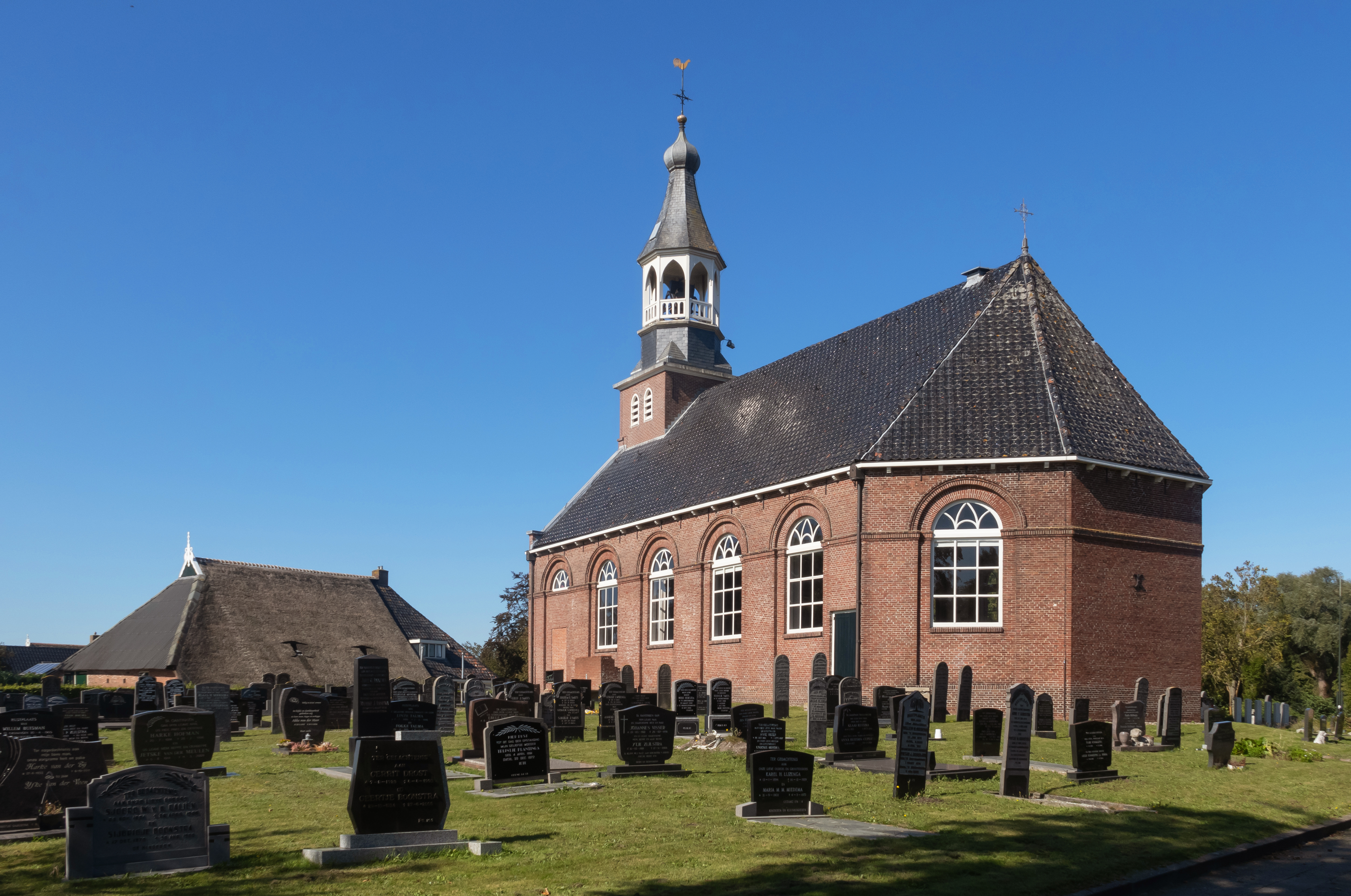
- The church of Akkerwoude (now in Damwoude)

- Flag Coat of arms

- Location in the Netherlands Akkerwoude (Netherlands)
- Coordinates: 53°17′N 5°59′E
- Country: Netherlands
- Province: Friesland
- Municipality: Dantumadiel

Akkerwoude (West Frisian: Ikkerwâld) is a former village in the Frisian municipality of Dantumadiel. On 1 January 1971 Akkerwoude, Dantumawoude and Murmerwoude were combined to form Damwâld. Akkerwoude was the most western village of the three. Akkerwoude was built around a church. The current church dates from 1849. This church was built on the same site of an earlier church from the thirteenth century.

In 1889 a dairy cooperative factory "Dokkumer Wâlden and omstreken" was established. This dairy factory was set up on the initiative of doctor Van der Sluis, the school master in Woudstra. In 1969, the dairy factory merged with Noordoostergo at Dokkum and the factory in Akkerwoude closed its doors.
