= Twijzel =

Twijzel Twizel (West Frisian)
- Village
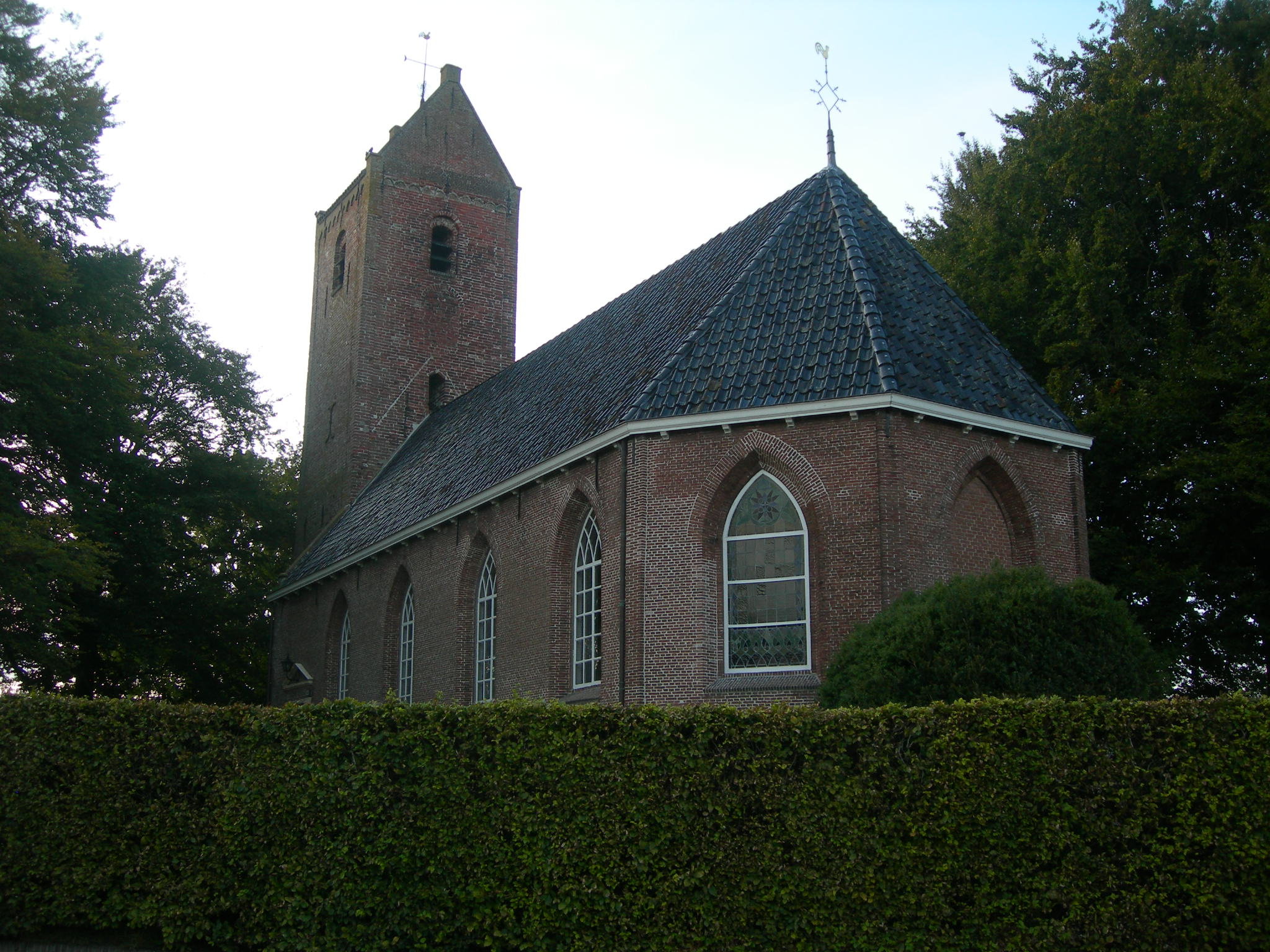
- St Peter Church

- Flag Coat of arms

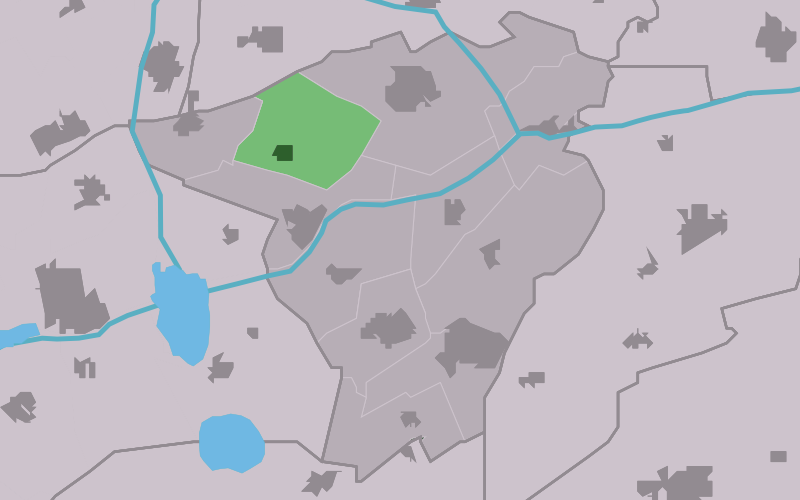
- Location in Achtkarspelen municipality

- Location in the Netherlands Twijzel (Netherlands)
- Country: Netherlands
- Province: Friesland
- Municipality: Achtkarspelen

Area
  - Total: 9.04 km^{2} (3.49 sq mi)
- Elevation: 2 m (6.6 ft)

Population (2021)
  - Total: 1,080
  - Density: 119/km^{2} (309/sq mi)
- Time zone: UTC+1 (CET)
  - Summer (DST): UTC+2 (CEST)
- Postal code: 9286
- Dialing code: 0512

Twijzel (West Frisian: Twizel) is a village in Achtkarspelen in the province of Friesland, the Netherlands, with a population of around 1080.

The village was first mentioned around 1240 as Twislum, and means near the crossroads. Twijzel was a stretched linear settlement along the road. The Dutch Reformed Church has a 13th-century tower. The church itself was built in 1692 as a replacement of its medieval predecessor. Twijzel was home to 927 people in 1840.

== Notable buildings ==
- The Protestant church of Twijzel

== Gallery ==
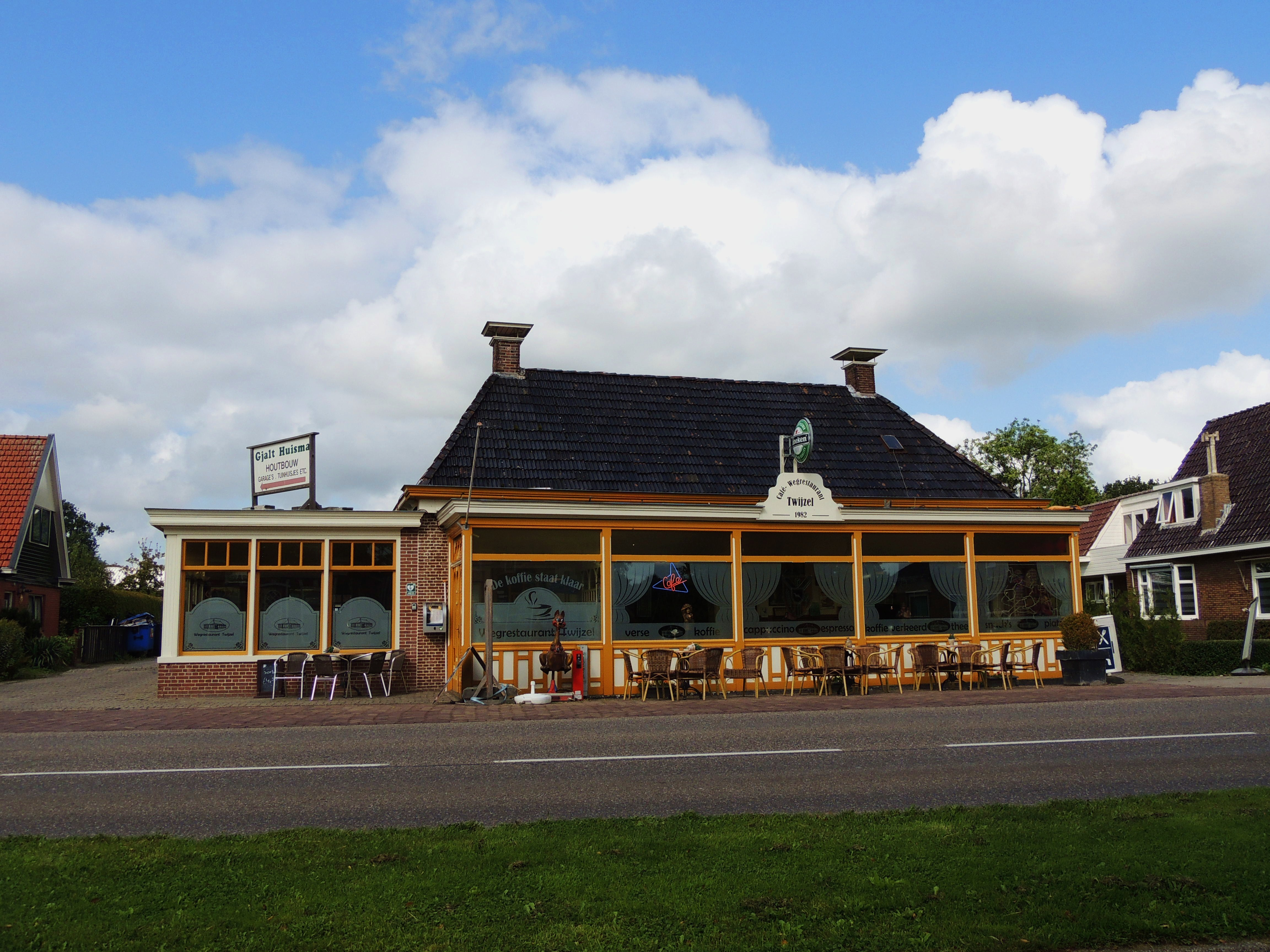
Pub in Twijzel

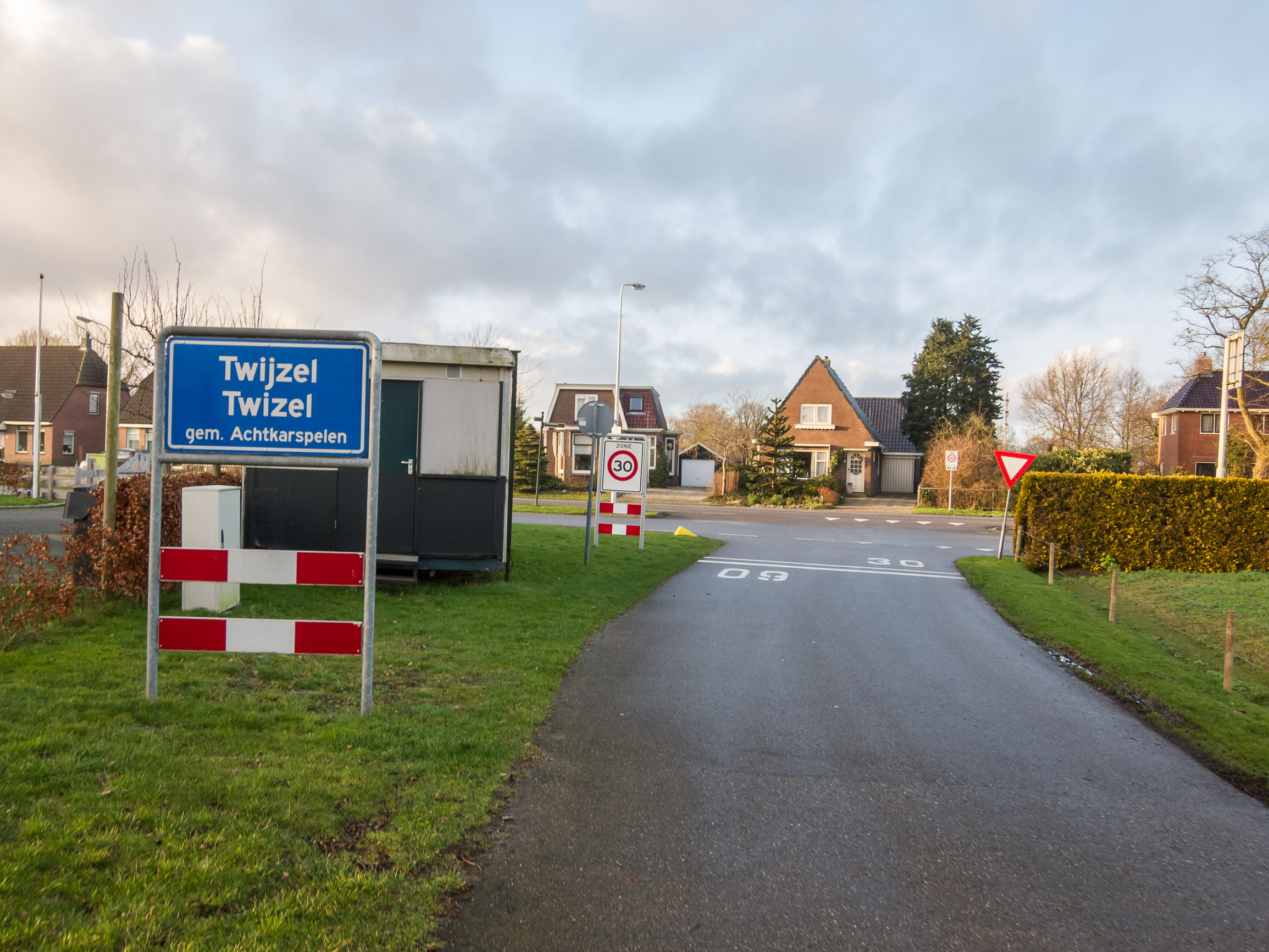
Welcome to Twijzel

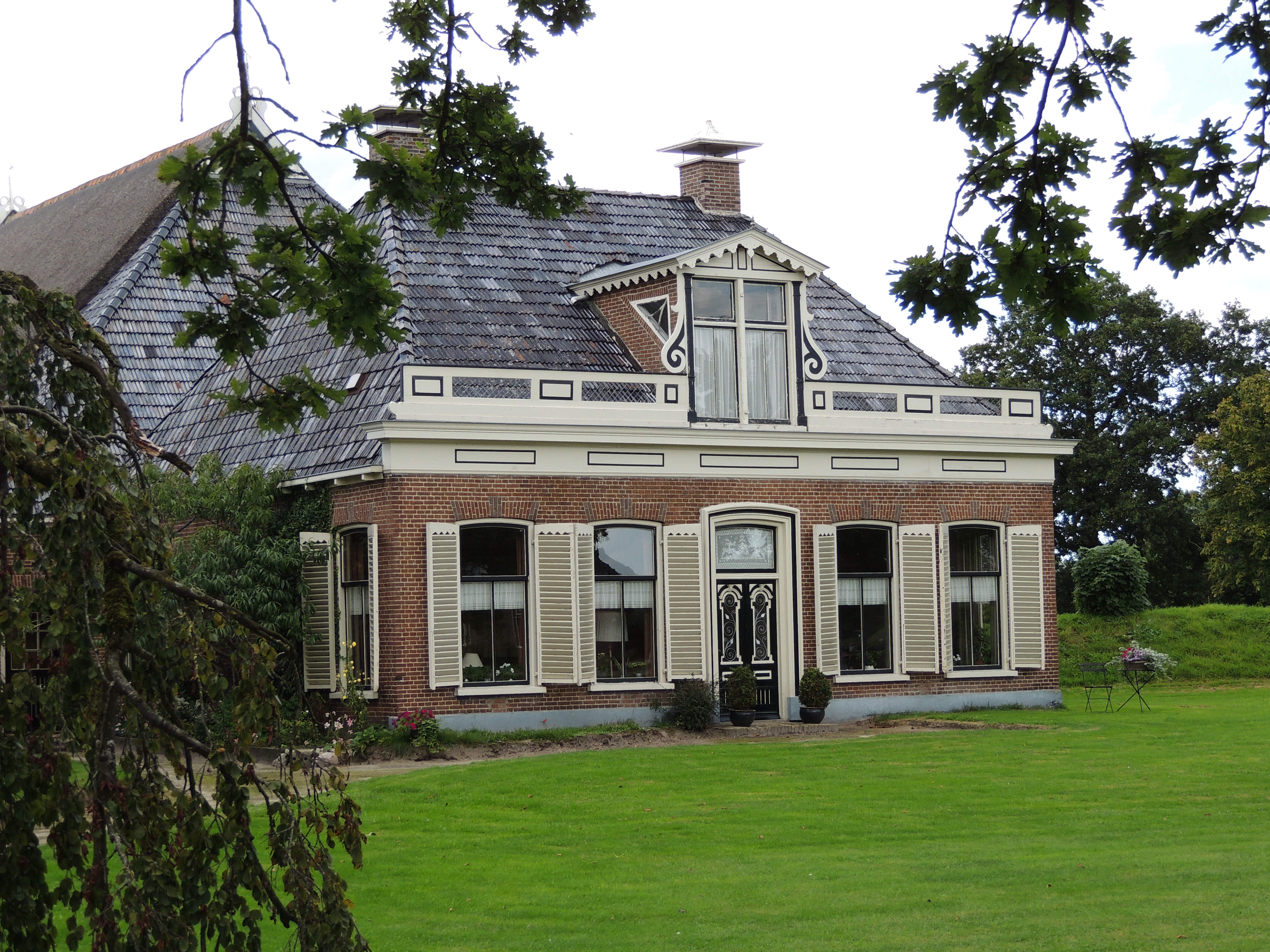
Farm in Twijzel

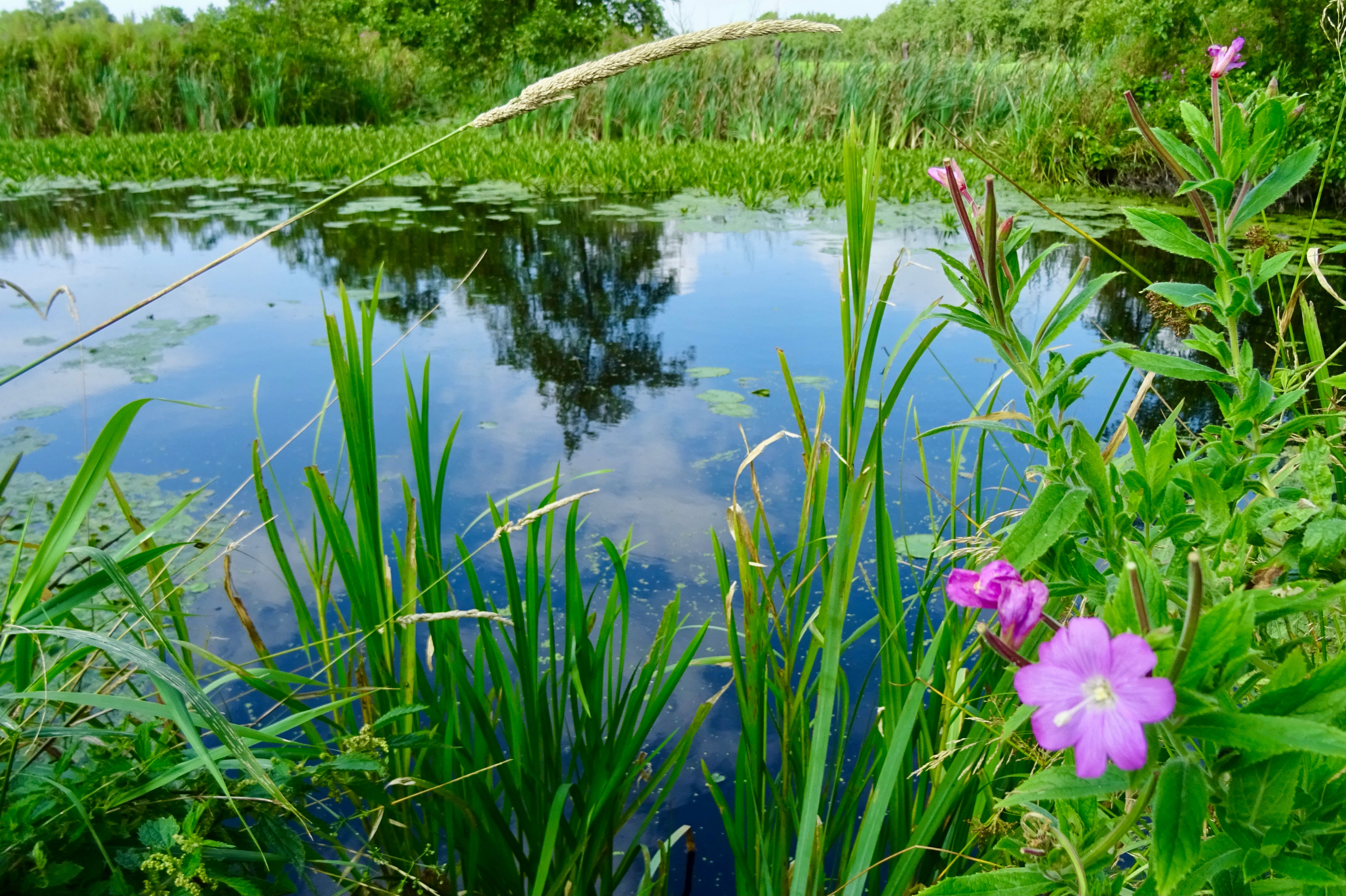
Twijzeler Mieden
