= Ryptsjerk =

Ryptsjerk Rijperkerk
- Village
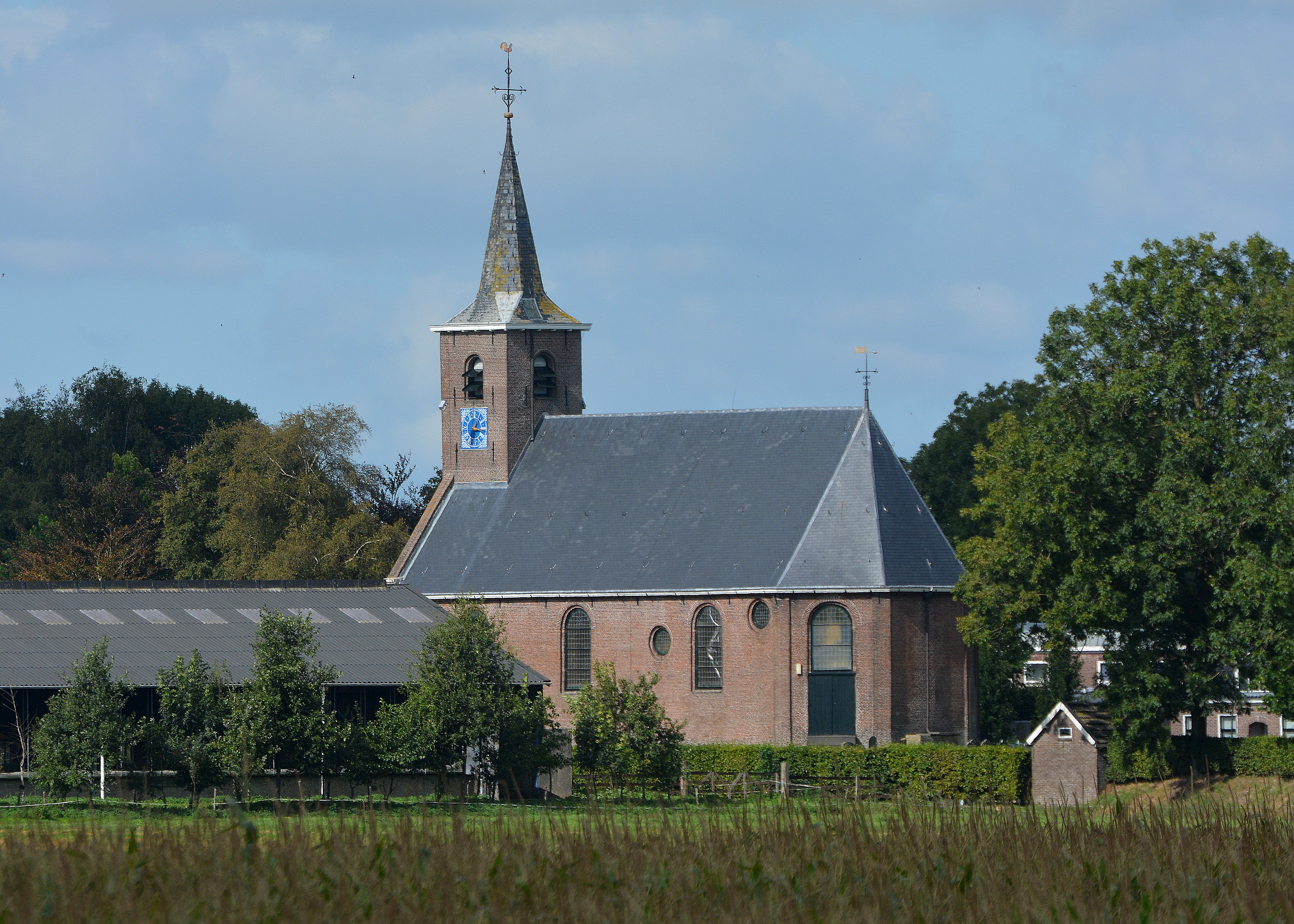
- Ryptsjerk Church

- Coat of arms

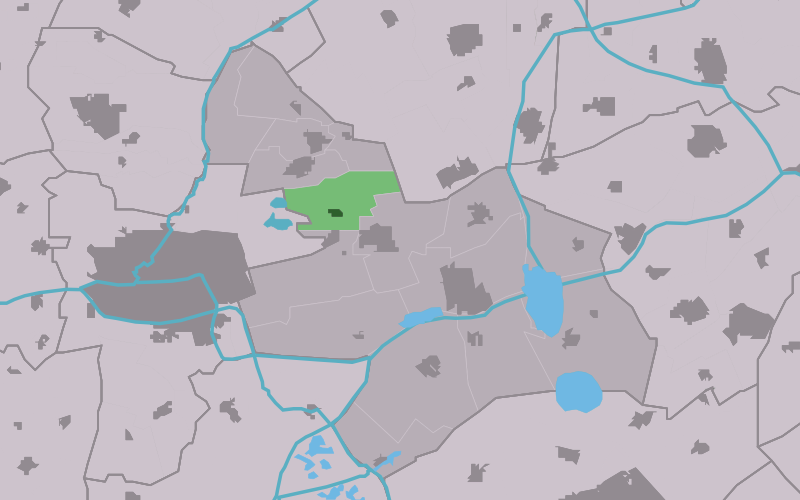
- Location of the village in Tytsjerksteradiel

- Location in the Netherlands Ryptsjerk (Netherlands)
- Country: Netherlands
- Province: Friesland
- Municipality: Tytsjerksteradiel

Area
  - Total: 8.03 km^{2} (3.10 sq mi)
- Elevation: 0.4 m (1.3 ft)

Population (2021)
  - Total: 785
  - Density: 97.8/km^{2} (253/sq mi)
- Time zone: UTC+1 (CET)
  - Summer (DST): UTC+2 (CEST)
- Postal code: 9256
- Dialing code: 0511

Ryptsjerk (Dutch: Rijperkerk) is a village in Tytsjerksteradiel municipality in the province of Friesland, the Netherlands. It had a population of around 767 in January 2017.

There is a restored windmill, the Ypey Mole.

== History ==
The village was first mentioned in 1314 as Ripikerka, and means church belonging to Rijp (short for Hurdegaryp). Ryptsjerk developed after the Zwarteweg from Leeuwarden to Vijversburg was built between 1528 and 1531. The Dutch Reformed church was built in 1757.

Ryptsjerk was home to 331 people in 1840. The polder mill Ypey Mole was built in 1858 near Vijversburg. Between 1980 and 1981, it was moved and restored to its current location where it is draining excess water from the Koekoekspetten.

== Gallery ==
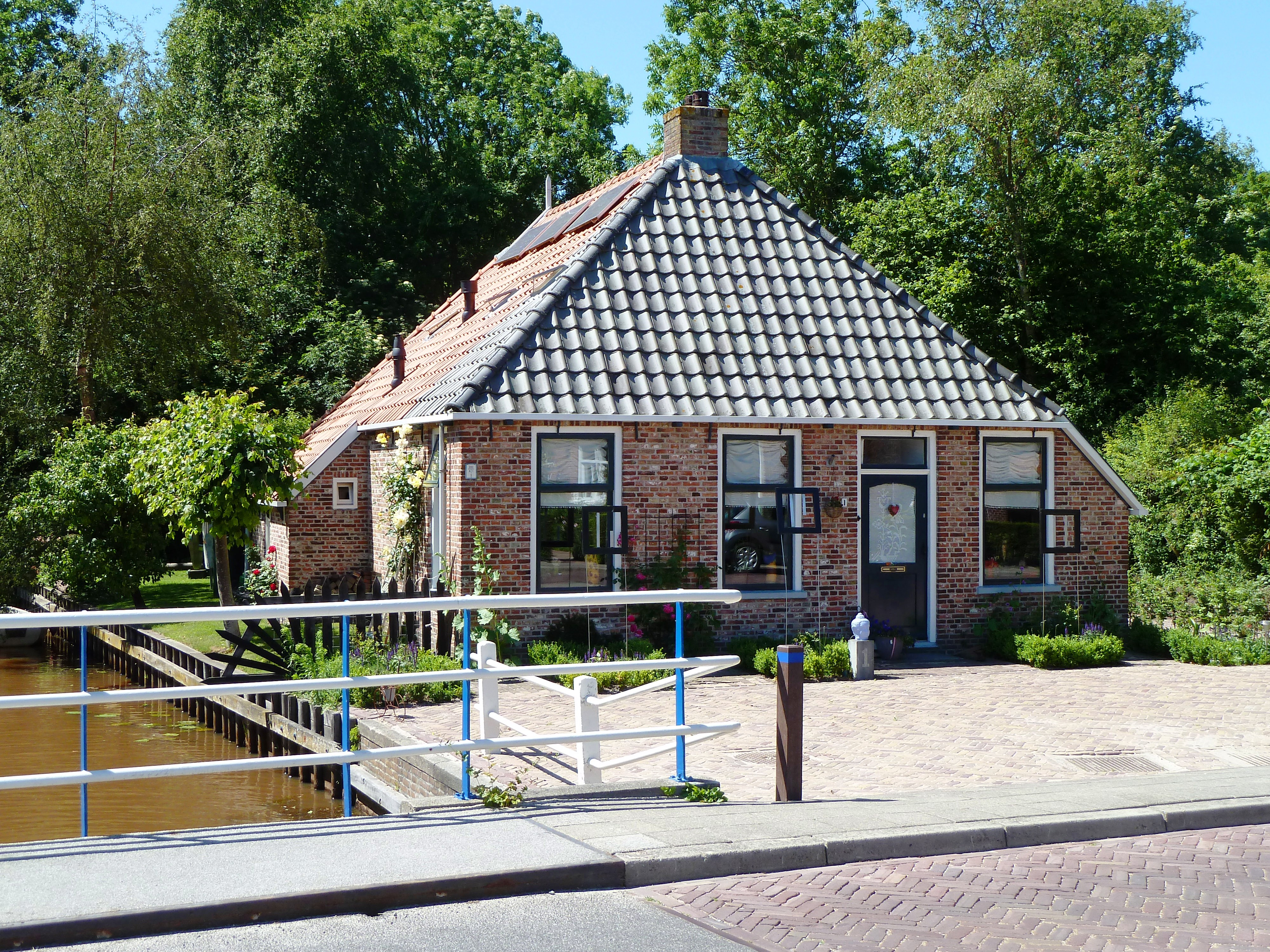
House in Ryptsjerk

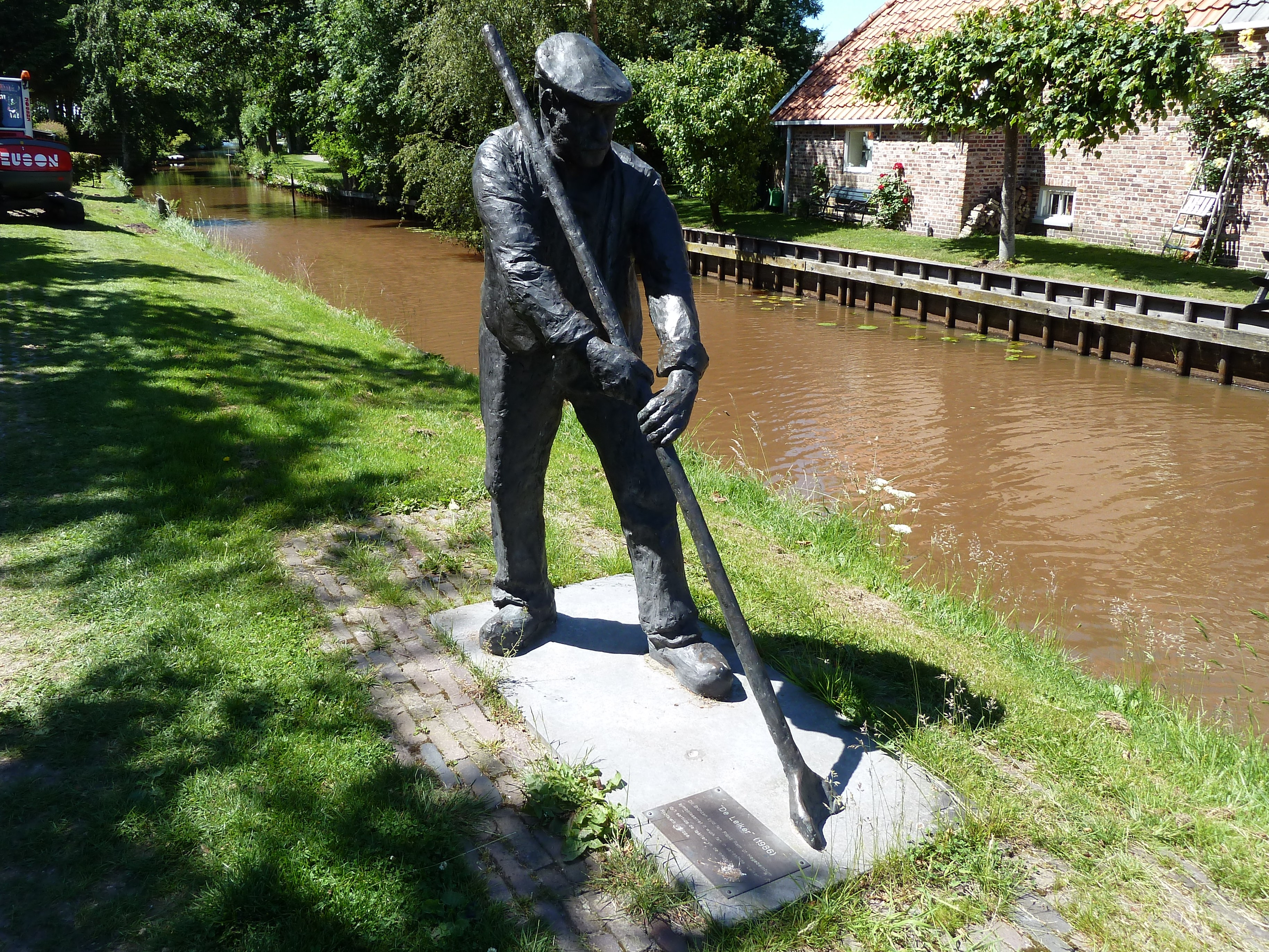
Leiker statue who removed peat from the canal

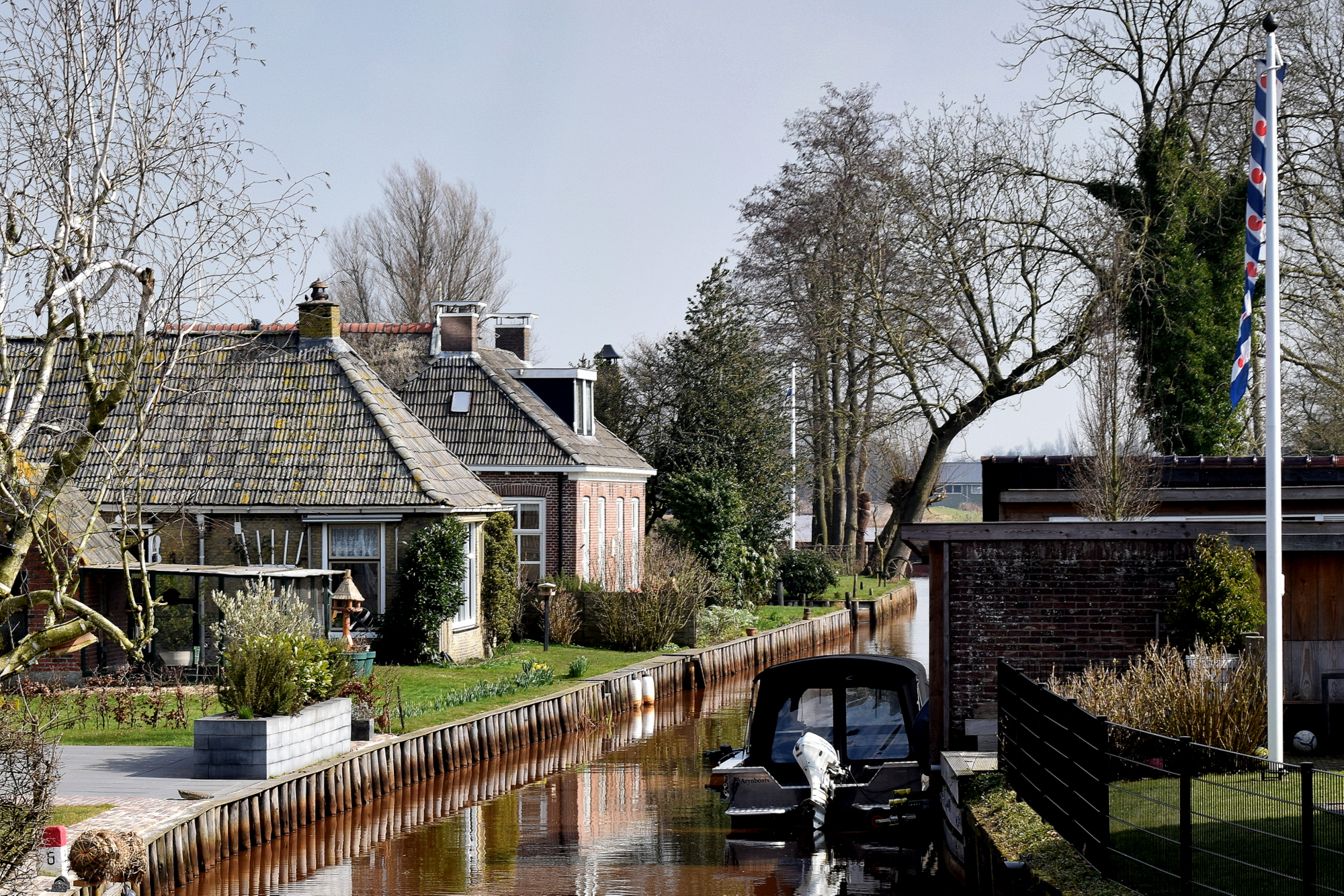
Canal view

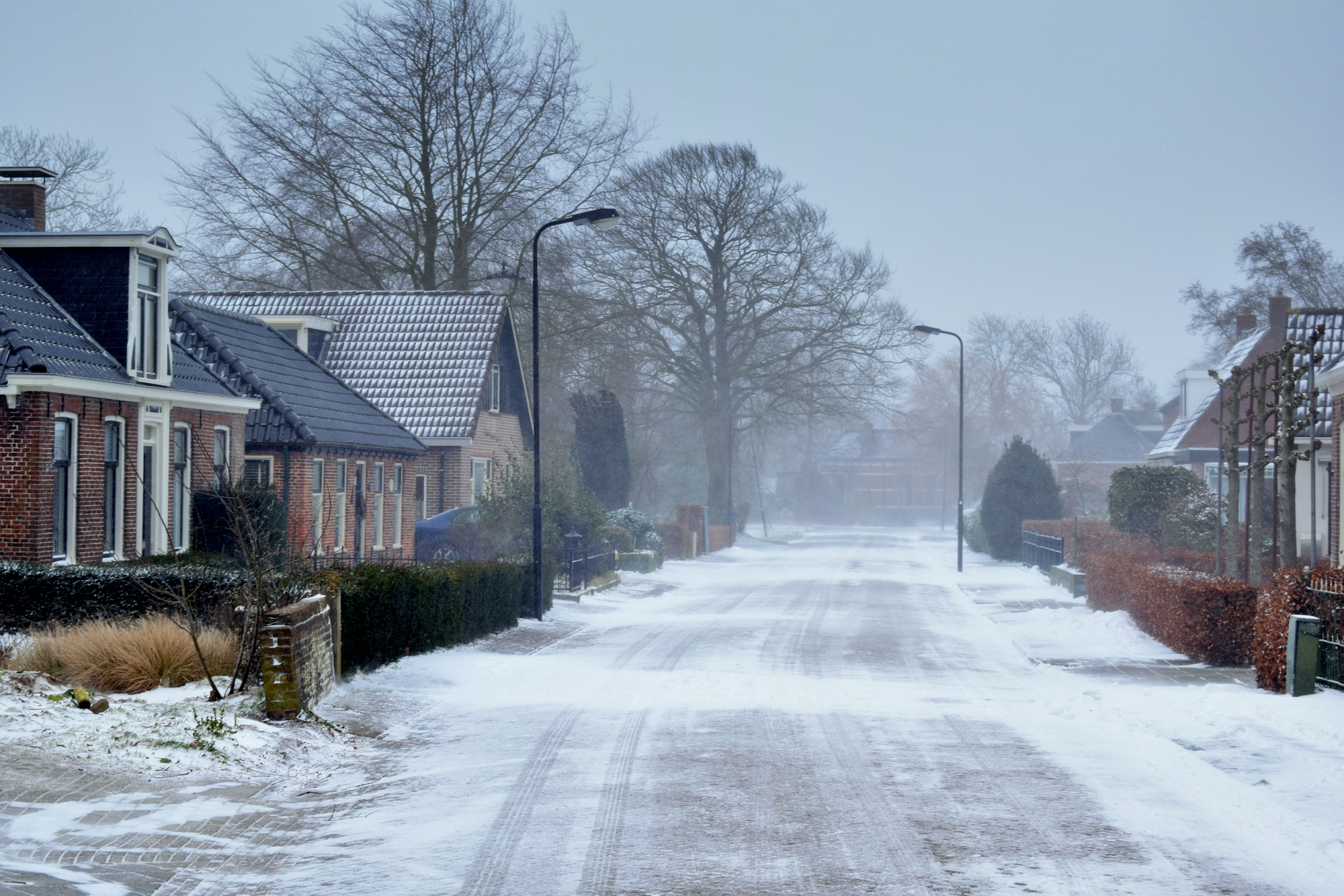
Winter view
