= Dantumadiel =

- Municipality
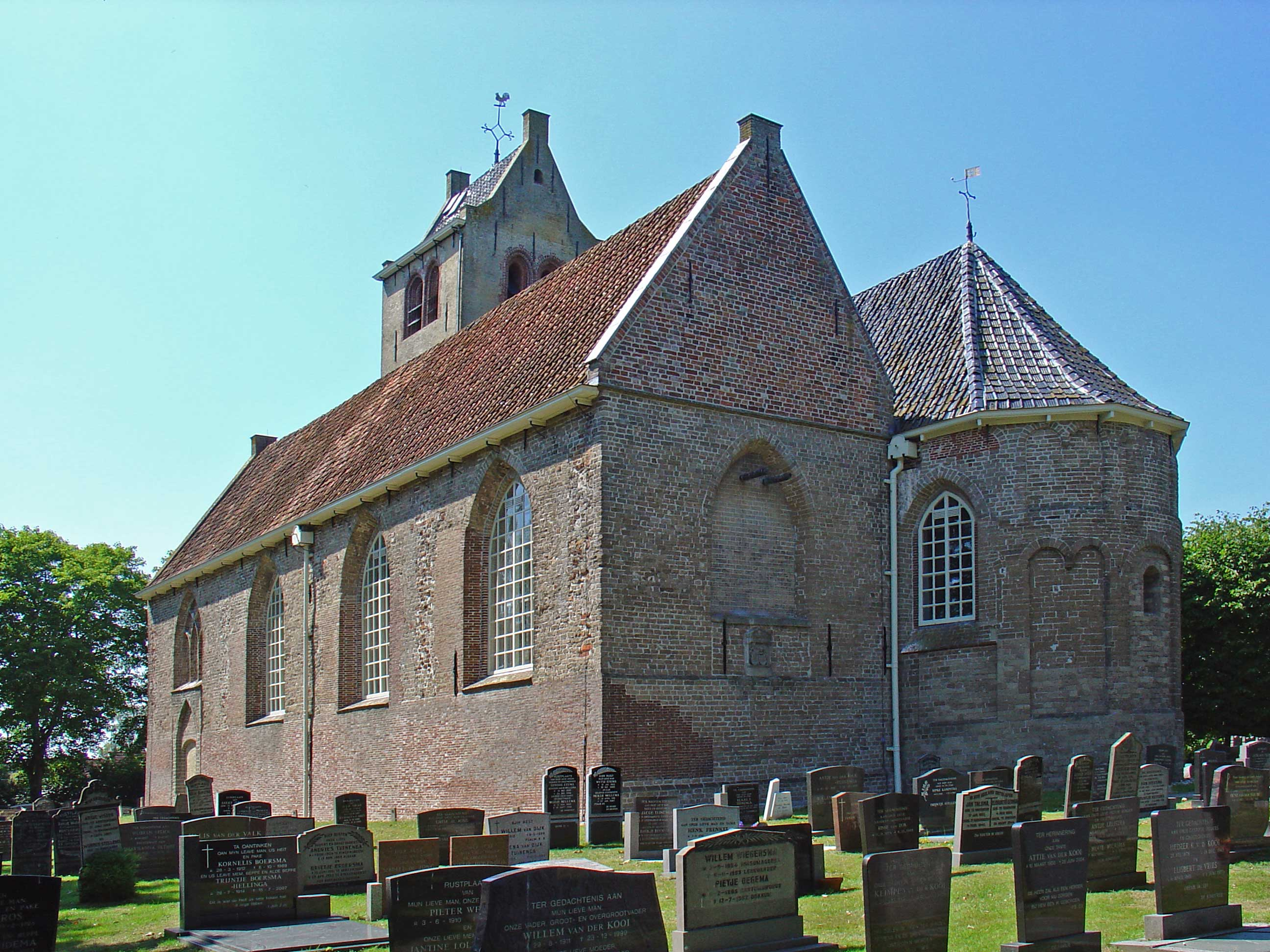
- Medieval church of Rinsumageast

- Flag Coat of arms

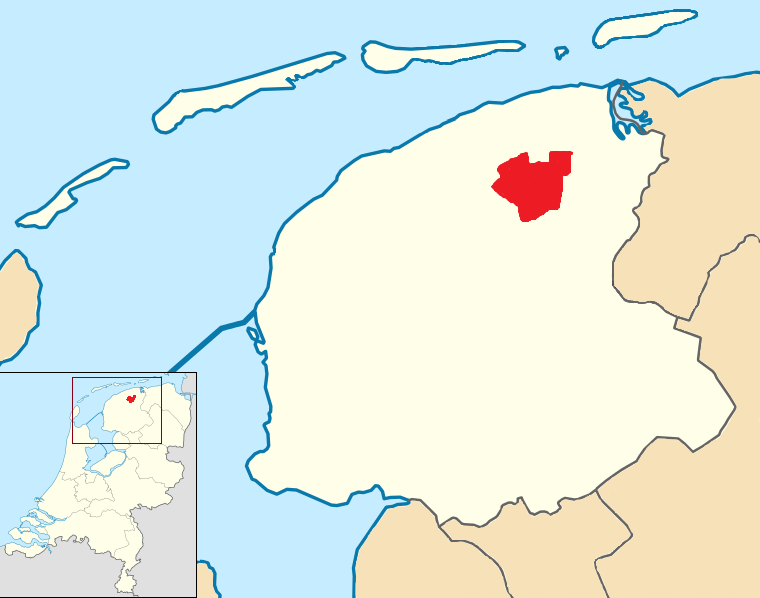
- Location in Friesland
- Coordinates: 53°17′N 6°0′E
- Country: Netherlands
- Province: Friesland

Government
  - Body: Municipal council
  - Mayor (acting): Anja Haga (CU)

Area
  - Total: 87.53 km^{2} (33.80 sq mi)
  - Land: 84.66 km^{2} (32.69 sq mi)
  - Water: 2.87 km^{2} (1.11 sq mi)
- Elevation: 2 m (6.6 ft)

Population (January 2021)
  - Total: 18,943
  - Density: 224/km^{2} (580/sq mi)
- Time zone: UTC+1 (CET)
  - Summer (DST): UTC+2 (CEST)
- Postcode: 9067, 9100–9114, 9269–9272
- Area code: 0511, 0519, 058
- Website: www.dantumadiel.frl

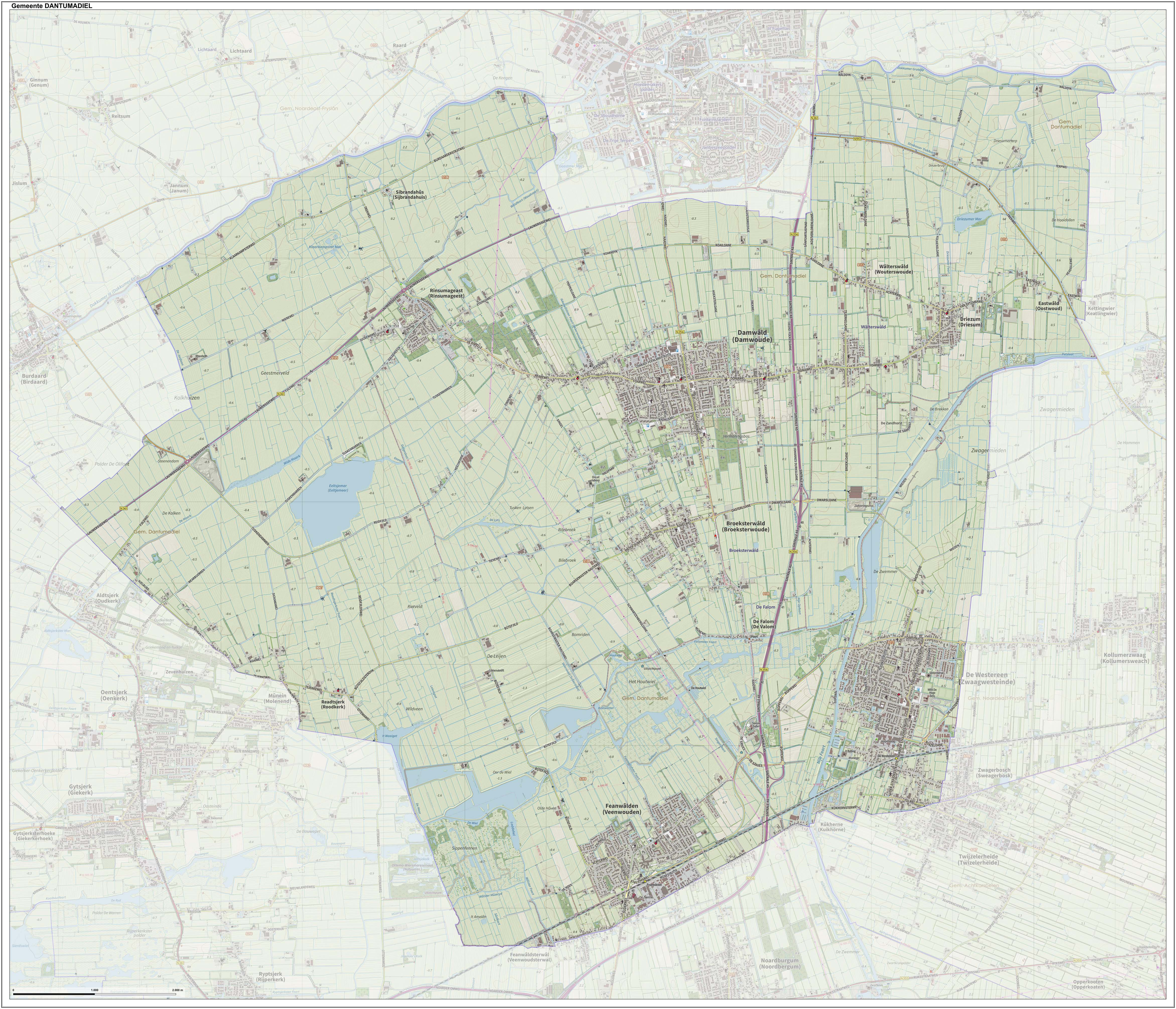
Dutch Topographic map of Dantumadiel, February 2024

Dantumadiel (West Frisian pronunciation) is a municipality in the province of Friesland in the Netherlands. Dantumadiel is a rural municipality characterized by agriculture.

== History ==
The earliest mention of Dantumadiel was in a document from 1242. At that time Dantumadiel, or Donthmadeil as it was then known, was a part of the Winninghe district, the northern part of Oostergo. The grietenij (municipality) Dantumadiel was led by a grietman (mayor) who was holding office in Rinsumageast and Dantumawâld. The Dutch Municipalities Act of 1851 (Dutch: Gemeentewet van 1851) abolished the grietenijen, which automatically became gemeenten (municipalities) headed by a mayor.

== Population centres ==
The Dantumadiel municipality is composed of 11 towns with a total of 19,030 inhabitants in 2014; the towns and their 2014 populations are listed in the table.

| Name | Residents |
| Damwâld | 5,640 |
| De Westereen | 5,087 |
| Feanwâlden * | 3,521 |
| Broeksterwâld | 1,168 |
| Rinsumageast | 1,139 |
| Wâlterswâld | 993 |
| Driezum | 974 |
| De Falom | 265 |
| Readtsjerk | 198 |
| Sibrandahûs | 45 |

Source: Website Dantumadiel municipality

* Including Feanwâldsterwâl

== Main sights ==
- Damwâld (Dantumawâld and Moarrewâld) and Rinsumageast, are home to medieval churches.
- The villages Broeksterwâld (Grutte Mûne and De Broekmolen) Rinsumageast and Readtsjerk are home to mills.
- The Skierstins a medieval fortified house in Feanwâlden.
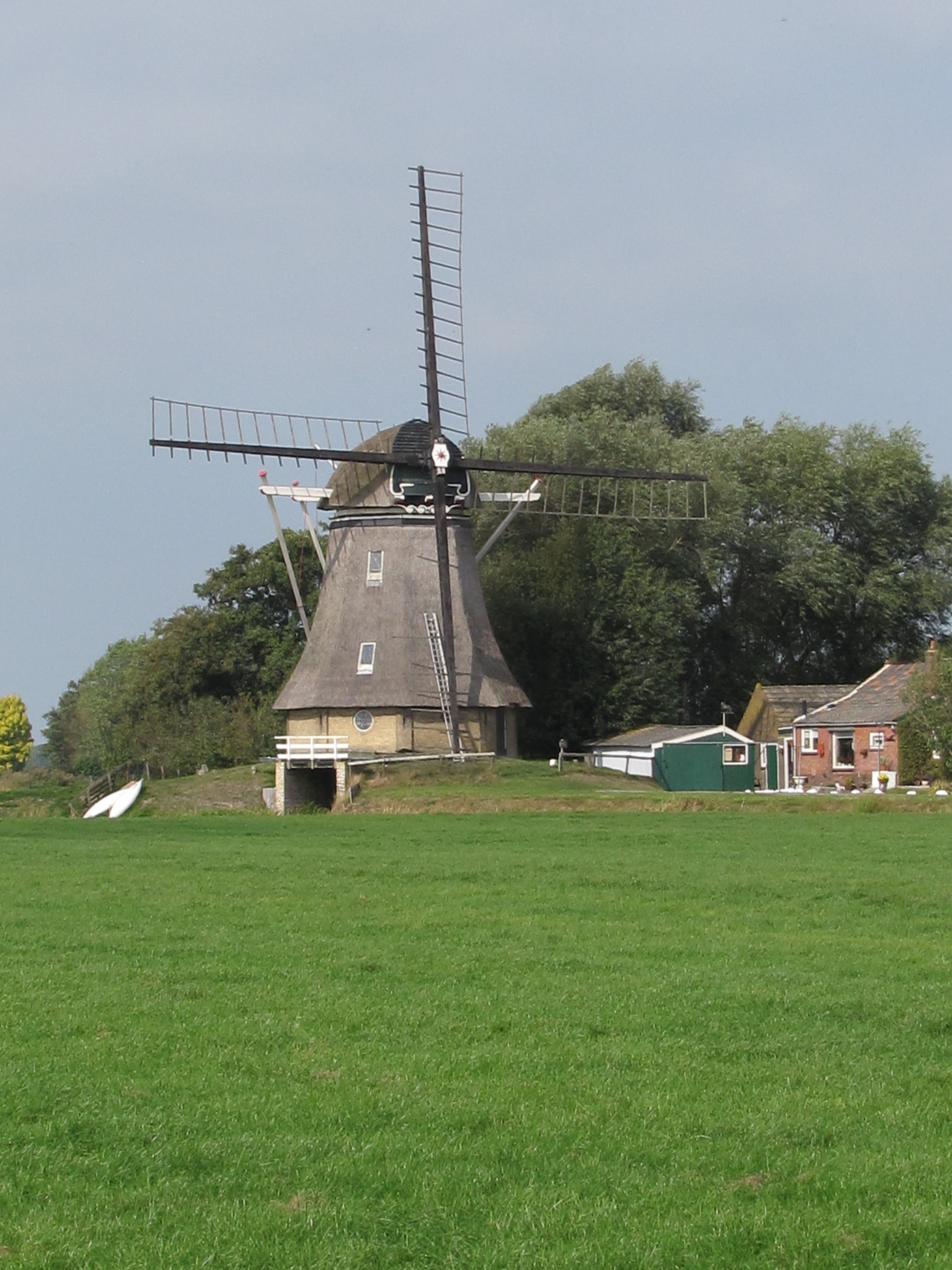
De Grote Molen, Broeksterwâld, built in 1887

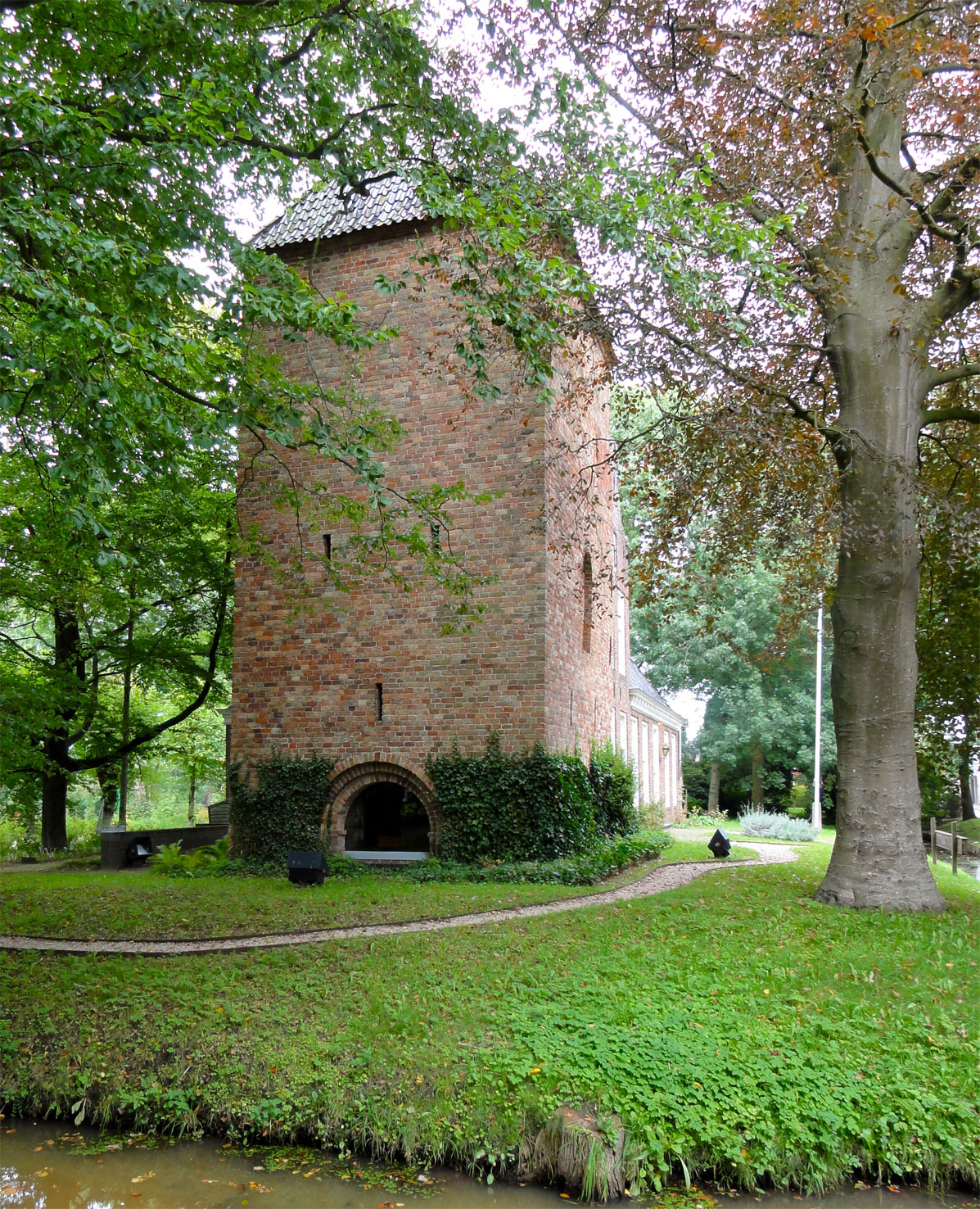
The Skierstins

== Notable people ==
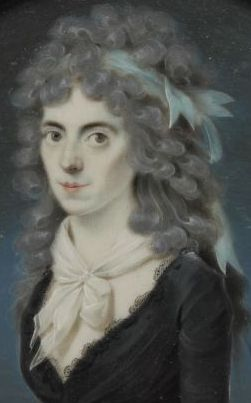
Maria Petronella Woesthoven

- Maria Petronella Woesthoven (1760 in Dantumawoude – 1830) a poet
- Tjeerd Pasma (1904 in Rinsumageast – 1944) a modern pentathlete, competed at the 1928 Summer Olympics
- Piet Jongeling (1909 in Broeksterwâld – 1985) journalist, politician and children's books writer
- Theun de Vries (1907 in Feanwâlden – 2005) writer and poet
- Jannes van der Wal (1956 in Driezum – 1996) a Dutch/Frisian draughts player
- Syb van der Ploeg (born 1966 in Dokkum) musician and composer
- Theo Pijper (born 1980 in Dokkum) a motorcycle speedway rider in the UK

== Politics ==
The Dantumadiel municipal government consists of a municipal council, board of aldermen and the mayor. Anja Haga has been acting mayor of Dantumadiel since November 2024.
