= List of windmills in Friesland (A–C) =

List of windmills in Friesland, Netherlands

A list of windmills in the Dutch province of Friesland, locations starting A–C.

== Locations ==
=== A ===
Location	Name of mill	Type	Built	Notes	Photograph
Abbega	Molen van Douwe Boschma; 53°00′38″N 5°34′17″E	Spinnenkopmolen	Before 1832	Demolished post-1885.	
Abbega	Molen van Fonger Ringnalda	53°01′17″N 5°34′23″E	Before 1832	Demolished post-1850.	
Abbega	Polder 40; 53°00′39″N 5°34′55″E	Spinnenkopmolen	Before 1832	Demolished post-1929.	
Abbega	Polder 58; 53°01′04″N 5°34′23″E	Spinnenkopmolen	Between 1850 and 1873	Demolished 1920.	
Abbega	Polder 59; 53°00′57″N 5°34′25″E		Before 1832	Demolished after 1873.	
Abbega	Polder 59a 53°00′41″N 5°34′40″E	Spinnenkopmolen	Before 1832	Demolished before 1929.	
Abbega	Polder 60; 53°00′59″N 5°33′53″E		Before 1832	Demolished before 1929.	
Abbega	Polder 61; 53°01′18″N 5°34′21″E		Before 1832	Demolished before 1929.	
Abbega	Polder 62; 53°01′00″N 5°33′41″E		Before 1832	Demolished before 1929.	
Abbega	Polder 63; 53°01′22″N 5°33′44″E	Spinnenkopmolen	Before 1832	Demolished before 1929.	
Abbega	Polder 65; 53°01′26″N 5°33′39″E		Before 1832	Demolished before 1929.	
Abbega	Westelijke Polder; Groote Oosthemmer Polder; 53°00′43″N 5°35′18″E	Spinnenkopmolen	Before 1832	Demolished 1927.	
Abbenwier	Polder 246; 53°03′58″N 5°47′37″E		Before 1832	Demolished before 1924.	
Abbenwier	Polder 246a 53°04′00″N 5°47′36″E		Before 1832	Demolished before 1924.	
Abbenwier	Polder 247; 53°03′43″N 5°47′18″E		Before 1832	Demolished before 1924.	
Achlum	De Achlumer Molen; 53°09′13″N 5°30′05″E	Grondzeiler	1851		
Achlum	Achlumer en Arumerpolder; 53°08′30″N 5°29′31″E	Grondzeiler	Before 1832	Demolished before 1928.	
Achlum	Molen van Alexander van Giffen; 53°09′18″N 5°30′09″E		Before 1832	Demolished before 1850.	
Achlum	Molen van Pieter Vellinga; 53°09′14″N 5°29′28″E	Achtkantemolen	Before 1832	Demolished post-1850. Probably the mill that became the Achlumer Molen.	
Aegum	Polder 38; 53°07′41″N 5°49′41″E		Before 1832	Demolished before 1925.	
Aegum	Polder 39; 53°07′55″N 5°49′05″E		Before 1832	Demolished before 1925.	
Aegum	Polder 40; 53°07′57″N 5°49′13″E	Spinnenkopmolen	Before 1832	Demolished post-1929.	
Aegum	Polder 41; 53°07′53″N 5°50′06″E	Spinnenkopmolen	Before 1832	Demolished post-1937.	
Aegum	Polder 41a 53°07′40″N 5°49′54″E		Before 1832	Demolished post-1850.	
Akkrum	Polder 99; 53°02′43″N 5°50′10″E	Spinnenkopmolen	Before 1832	Demolished before 1924.	
Akkrum	Polder 100; Polslootpoldermolen; Spookmolen; 53°02′36″N 5°50′13″E	Spinnenkopmolen	1849	Blown down 1972.	
Akkrum	Potslootpoldermolen; Spookmolen; 53°02′36″N 5°50′13″E	Spinnenkopmolen	1976	Dismantled 2003. Rebuilt at a new site in Akkrum (Mellemolen) in 2004.	
Akkrum	Mellemolen; 53°01′54″N 5°50′10″E	Spinnenkop	2004		
Akkrum	De Eendragt; 53°02′49″N 5°50′12″E	Stellingmolen	1841	Demolishedn 1891.	
Akkrum	De Eendragt; Molen van Schuurmans; 53°03′00″N 5°50′05″E	Stellingmolen	1855	Demolished 1966.	
Akkrum	Molen van Anne Zonneveld; 53°03′46″N 5°48′13″E		Before 1832	Demolished before 1850.	
Akkrum	Molen van Fetse Koopmans; 53°03′46″N 5°49′59″E	Spinnenkopmolen	Before 1832	Demolished before 1850.	
Akkrum	Molen van her Klooster Aalsum; 53°04′26″N 5°48′20″E	Standerdmolen	Before 1399	Demolished before 1664.	
Akkrum	Molen van Jacobus Hofstra; 53°02′49″N 5°50′39″E	Spinnenkopmolen	Before 1832	Demolished 1866.	
Akkrum	Molen van Jr. Lycklama à Nijeholt; 53°03′11″N 5°49′20″E	Tjasker	Before 1832	Demolished post-1850.	
Akkrum	Polder 100a 53°02′17″N 5°50′40″E		Before 1832	Demolished 1877.	
Akkrum	Polder 101; 53°02′39″N 5°51′25″E		Before 1832	Demolished before 1924.	
Akkrum	Polder 250; 53°03′09″N 5°48′11″E		Before 1832	Demolished before 1924.	
Akkrum	Polder 251; 53°03′16″N 5°48′12″E		Before 1832	Demolished before 1924.	
Akkrum	Polder 252; 53°03′39″N 5°48′04″E		Before 1876	Demolished before 1924.	
Akkrum	Polder 253; 53°03′39″N 5°48′35″E		Before 1832	Demolished before 1924.	
Akkrum	Polder 254; 53°03′36″N 5°48′30″E		Before 1832	Demolished before 1924.	
Akkrum	Polder 255; 53°03′29″N 5°49′06″E		Before 1832	Demolished before 1924.	
Akkrum	Polder 256; 53°03′22″N 5°49′21″E		Before 1876	Demolished before 1924.	
Akkrum	Polder 257; 53°02′56″N 5°49′12″E		Before 1832	Demolished before 1924.	
Akkrum	Polder 258; 53°02′59″N 5°49′34″E		Before 1832	Demolished before 1924.	
Akkrum	Polder 259; 53°02′57″N 5°49′49″E		Before 1832	Demolished before 1924.	
Akkrum	Polder 260; 53°02′56″N 5°49′52″E		Before 1832	Demolished before 1924.	
Akkrum	Polder 261; 53°03′58″N 5°48′40″E	Spinnenkopmolen	Before 1832	Demolished before 1924.	
Akkrum	Polder 262; 53°03′29″N 5°49′18″E	Spinnenkopmolen	Before 1832	Demolished before 1924.	
Akkrum	Polder 263; 53°03′29″N 5°49′41″E	Spinnenkopmolen	Before 1832	Demolished before 1924.	
Akkrum	Polder 264; 53°03′17″N 5°49′41″E	Spinnenkopmolen	Before 1832	Demolished before 1924.	
Akkrum	Polder 265; 53°03′04″N 5°49′44″E		Before 1832	Demolished before 1924.	
Akkrum	Polder 266; 53°03′18″N 5°49′46″E	Spinnenkopmolen	Before 1832	Demolished before 1924.	
Akkrum	Polder 267; 53°03′35″N 5°49′58″E	Spinnenkopmolen	Before 1832	Demolished before 1924.	
Akkrum	Polder 268; 53°03′50″N 5°49′41″E	Spinnenkopmolen	Before 1832	Demolished c.1915.	
Akkrum	Polder 269; 53°03′50″N 5°49′24″E	Spinnenkopmolen	Before 1832	Demolished before 1924.	
Akkrum	Polder 270; 53°04′06″N 5°49′09″E	Spinnenkopmolen	Before 1832	Demolished before 1924.	
Akkrum	Polder 271; 53°04′09″N 5°48′51″E	Spinnenkopmolen	Before 1832	Demolished before 1924.	
Akkrum	Polder 272; 53°04′23″N 5°49′13″E	Spinnenkopmolen	Before 1832	Demolished before 1924.	
Akkrum	Polder 273; 53°04′27″N 5°48′56″E	Spinnenkopmolen	Before 1832	Demolished before 1924.	
Akkrum	Polder 276; 53°04′17″N 5°50′35″E	Spinnenkopmolen	Before 1832	Demolished before 1924.	
Akkrum	Polder 285; 53°02′56″N 5°51′01″E	Tjasker	Before 1832	Demolished before 1924.	
Akkrum	Polder 286; 53°02′52″N 5°51′48″E	Tjasker	Before 1832	Demolished before 1924.	
Akkrum	Polder 314; 53°03′24″N 5°52′08″E	Tjasker	Before 1832	Demolished before 1924.	
Akkrum	Polder 316; 53°03′05″N 5°51′34″E	Tjasker	Before 1832	Demolished before 1924.	
Akkrum	Polder 317; 53°03′21″N 5°51′31″E	Tjasker	Before 1832	Demolished before 1924.	
Akkrum	Polder 318; 53°03′24″N 5°51′35″E	Tjasker	Before 1832	Demolished before 1924.	
Akkrum	Polder 319; 53°03′18″N 5°51′18″E	Tjasker	Before 1832	Demolished before 1924.	
Akmarijp	Molen van Klaas Hettinga; 53°00′23″N 5°47′09″E		Before 1832	Demolished before 1850.	
Akmarijp	Molen van Ruurd de Boer; 53°00′34″N 5°47′20″E		Before 1832	Demolished 1897.	
Akmarijp	Polder 75; 53.°N 5.°E	Spinnnekopmolen	Before 1877	Demolished before 1929.	
Akmarijp	Polder 75A; 53°59′59″N 5°48′03″E		1877	Demolished post-1929.	
Akmarijp	Polder 76; 53°59′49″N 5°47′27″E	Spinnenkopmolen	Before 1832	Demolished before 1929.	
Akmarijp	Polder 77; 53°00′01″N 5°47′18″E	Spinnenkopmolen	Before 1832	Demolished before 1929.	
Akmarijp	Polder 78; 53°00′13″N 5°47′17″E	Spinnenkopmolen	Before 1832	Demolished before 1929.	
Akmarijp	Polder 79; 53.°N 5.°E	Grondzeiler	1897	Demolished post-1929.	
Akmarijp	Polder 79A; Winterpolder van Akmarijp; 53°00′18″N 5°47′10″E	Spinnenkopmolen	Before 1832	Demolished before 1929.	
Akmarijp	Polder 80; 53°00′23″N 5°47′20″E	Spinnenkopmolen	Before 1832	Demolished before 1929.	
Akmarijp	Polder 80A; 53°00′42″N 5°42′24″E	Spinnenkopmolen	Before 1877	Demolished before 1929.	
Akmarijp	Polder 82; 53°00′40″N 5°47′23″E	Spinnenkopmolen	Before 1832	Demolished before 1929.	
Aldeboarn	Hooismanmolen; 53°02′51″N 5°53′26″E	Stellingmolen	1737	Demolished 1916, base demolished 1926.	
Aldeboarn	Korenmolen van Oldeboorn; 53°02′51″N 5°53′26″E	Standerdmolen	Before 1664	Demolished c.1761.	
Aldeboarn	Molen van Auke Hofstra; 53°04′41″N 5°54′54″E		Before 1832	Demolished before 1850.	
Aldeboarn	Molenn van Jr. Binnert van Eijsinga nom ux 53°03′29″N 5°55′37″E		Before 1832	Demolished before 1850.	
Aldeboarn	Molen van Tinco Lycklama à Nijeholt; 53°03′15″N 5°51′54″E		Before 1832	Demolished before 1850.	
Aldeboarn	Polder 102; 53°02′37″N 5°51′48″E		Before 1832	Demolished before 1924.	
Aldeboarn	Polder 103; 53°02′34″N 5°52′30″E		Before 1832	Demolished before 1924.	
Aldeboarn	Polder 104; 53°02′43″N 5°53′03″E		Before 1832	Demolished before 1924.	
Aldeboarn	Poloder 105; 53°02′35″N 5°53′37″E	Spinnenkopmolen	Before 1832	Demolished before 1924.	
Aldeboarn	Polder 106; 53°02′36″N 5°53′38″E	Spinnenkopmolen	Before 1832	Demolished before 1924.	
Aldeboarn	Polder 107; 53°02′31″N 5°53′33″E	Spinnenkopmolen	Before 1832	Demolished before 1924.	
Aldeboarn	Polder 108; 53°02′43″N 5°54′19″E		Before 1832	Demolished before 1924.	
Aldeboarn	Polder 109; 53°02′41″N 5°54′33″E		Before 1832	Demolished before 1924.	
Aldeboarn	Polder 110; 53°02′40″N 5°55′39″E		Before 1832	Demolished before 1850.	
Aldeboarn	Polder 111; 53°02′34″N 5°52′37″E		Before 1832	Demolished before 1924.	
Aldeboarn	Polder 112; Zathe de Zuipschuur; 53°02′33″N 5°52′24″E		Before 1832	Demolished before 1924.	
Aldeboarn	Polder 113; 53°02′26″N 5°51′53″E		Before 1832	Demolished before 1924.	
Aldeboarn	Polder 114; 53°02′22″N 5°52′08″E		Before 1832	Demolished before 1924.	
Aldeboarn	Polder 114; 53°02′15″N 5°52′08″E		Before 1832	Demolished between 1850 and 1877.	
Aldeboarn	Polder 115; 53°02′02″N 5°52′22″E		Before 1832	Demolished before 1924.	
Aldeboarn	Polder 116; 53°02′01″N 5°51′56″E		Before 1832	Demolished before 1924.	
Aldeboarn	Polder 117; 53°01′47″N 5°52′24″E		Before 1832	Demolished before 1850.	
Aldeboarn	Polder 117a 53°01′38″N 5°52′07″E		Before 1832	Demolished before 1924.	
Aldeboarn	Polder 118; 53°01′37″N 5°52′08″E		Before 1832	Demolished before 1924.	
Aldeboarn	Polder 287; 53°03′00″N 5°52′28″E		Before 1832	Demolished before 1924.	
Aldeboarn	Polder 288; 53°02′48″N 5°53′54″E		Before 1832	Demolished before 1924.	
Aldeboarn	Polder 289; 53°02′48″N 5°54′05″E		Before 1832	Demolished before 1924.	
Aldeboarn	Polder 290; 53°02′47″N 5°54′17″E		Between 1850 and 1876	Demolished before 1924.	
Aldeboarn	Polder 291; 53°02′58″N 5°54′36″E		Before 1832	Demolished before 1924.	
Aldeboarn	Polder 292; 53°03′03″N 5°55′14″E		Before 1832	Demolished post-1850.	
Aldeboarn	Polder 293; 53°02′58″N 5°55′38″E		Before 1832	Demolished post-1850.	
Aldeboarn	Polder 294; 53°03′10″N 5°55′55″E		Before 1832	Demolished post-1850.	
Aldeboarn	Polder 295; 53°03′00″N 5°56′09″E		Before 1832	Demolished post-1850.	
Aldeboarn	Polder 296; 53°02′51″N 5°56′00″E		Before 1832	Demolished post-1850.	
Aldeboarn	Polder 296a 53°02′49″N 5°56′03″E		1876	Demolished before 1924.	
Aldeboarn	Polder 297; 53°03′15″N 5°55′39″E		Before 1832	Demolished post-1930.	
Aldeboarn	Polder 298; 53°03′21″N 5°55′36″E		Before 1832	Demolished post-1850.	
Aldeboarn	Polder 299; 53°04′07″N 5°55′31″E		Before 1832	Demolished post-1930.	
Aldeboarn	Polder 300; 53°03′53″N 5°55′19″E		Before 1832	Demolished post-1850.	
Aldeboarn	Polder 301; 53°03′53″N 5°55′08″E		Before 1932	Demolished post-1930.	
Aldeboarn	Polder 302; 53°03′37″N 5°55′13″E		Before 1932	Demolished post-1932.	
Aldeboarn	Polder 303; 53°03′35″N 5°55′04″E		Before 1832	Demolished post-1930.	
Aldeboarn	Polder 304; 53°03′28″N 5°55′15″E		Before 1832	Demolished post-1930.	
Aldeboarn	Polder 305; 53°03′16″N 5°54′32″E		Between 1850 and 1876	Demolished between 1924 and 1929.	
Aldeboarn	Polder 306; 53°03′05″N 5°54′29″E		Before 1832	Demolished before 1924.	
Aldeboarn	Polder 307; 53°03′03″N 5°54′03″E		Before 1832	Demolished before 1924.	
Aldeboarn	Polder 308; 53°03′00″N 5°53′56″E		Before 1832	Demolished between 1924 and 1929.	
Aldeboarn	Polder 309; 53°03′05″N 5°53′56″E		Before 1832	Demolished between 1924 and 1929.	
Aldeboarn	Polder 310; 53°03′21″N 5°53′49″E		Before 1832	Demolished between 1924 and 1929.	
Aldeboarn	Polder 311; 53°03′24″N 5°53′20″E		Before 1832	Demolished between 1924 and 1929.	
Aldeboarn	Polder 312; 53°03′29″N 5°53′12″E		Before 1832	Demolished between 1924 and 1929.	
Aldeboarn	Polder 313; 53°03′27″N 5°52′25″E		Before 1832	Demolished between 1924 and 1929.	
Aldeboarn	Polder 315; 53°02′58″N 5°51′52″E		Before 1832	Demolished post-1929.	
Aldeboarn	Polder 326; 53°04′26″N 5°53′41″E		Before 1876	Demolished before 1924.	
Aldeboarn	Polder 331; 53°03′44″N 5°52′59″E		1876	Demolished before 1924.	
Aldeboarn	Polder 332; 53°04′00″N 5°54′08″E		Before 1825	Demolished before 1930.	
Aldeboarn	Polder 333; 53°03′50″N 5°54′33″E		Before 1832	Demolished post-1930.	
Aldeboarn	Polder 334; 53°03′41″N 5°54′55″E		Before 1832	Demolished post-1930.	
Aldeboarn	Polder 335; 53°04′42″N 5°55′09″E		Before 1876	Demolished before 1924.	
Aldeboarn	Polder 335a 53°04′30″N 5°55′12″E		Before 1832	Demolished between 1850 and 1876.	
Aldeboarn	Polder 335b 53°04′33″N 5°55′30″E		Before 1876	Demolished before 1924.	
Aldeboarn	Polder 335c 53°04′14″N 5°55′43″E		Before 1832	Demolished between 1850 and 1876.	
Aldeboarn	Polder 336; Polder van der Krieke; 53°04′23″N 5°55′52″E	Spinnenkop	c. 1897	Moved to Goëngahuizen 2009.	
Aldtsjerk	De Ouderkerkermolen; 53°15′55″N 5°52′38″E	Grondzeiler	1864		
Aldtsjerk	Oudkerkerpolder; 53°15′55″N 5°52′40″E	Grondzeiler	Before 1864	Demolished post-1874.	
Aldtsjerk	Oudkerkerpolder; 53°15′59″N 5°52′50″E		1850	Demolished between 1864 and 1874.	
Aldtsjerk	Oudekerkerpolder; 53°15′56″N 5°52′28″E		Before 1850	Demolished between 1864 and 1874.	
Aldtsjerk	Polder 19; 53°16′28″N 5°50′48″E		Before 1850	Demolished before 1930.	
Aldtsjerk	Polder 20; 53°16′35″N 5°51′31″E		Before 1832	Demolished post-1850.	
Aldtsjerk	Polder 110; Kooilust; 53°15′27″N 5°53′34″E	Grondzeiler	Before 1832	Demolished 1932.	
Aldtsjerk	Polder 111; Water Molen; 53°15′31″N 5°53′09″E		Before 1718	Demolished before 1926.	
Aldtsjerk	Polder 111a 53°15′46″N 5°53′13″E		Before 1832	Demolished before 1850.	
Aldtsjerk	Polder 112; 53°15′58″N 5°51′29″E	Spinnenkopmolen	Before 1832	Demolished post-1930.	
Aldtsjerk	Polder 113a 53°16′23″N 5°50′34″E		Between 1832 and 1850	Demolished post-1949.	
Aldtsjerk	Polder 114; 53°16′20″N 5°51′40″E		Before 1832	Demolished before 1928.	
Aldtsjerk	Polder 114a 53°16′10″N 5°53′30″E		Before 1832	Demolished before 1850.	
Aldtsjerk	Polder 115; 53°16′09″N 5°53′30″E		Before 1850	Demolished before 1930.	
Aldtsjerk	Zaagmolen van Jelle van der Meulen; 53°15′58″N 5°53′10″E		Between 1800 and 1812	Moved to Buitenpost 1840.	
Aldwâld	Husternoard; Huisternoord; 53.°N 6.°E	Stellingmolen	1857	Demolished 1941, truncated base remains.	
Aldwâld	Polder 1 De Warren; 53°17′12″N 6°06′19″E		Before 1854	Demolished before 1926.	
Aldwâld	Polder Oudwoude en Westergeest; 53°17′36″N 6°06′16″E	Grondzeiler	1877	Demolished 1928.	
Allingawier	De IJzeren Kou; 53°02′59″N 5°26′43″E	Paaltjasker	1970 or 1972	Dismantled 2019, stored at Menaldumadeel.	
Allingawier	Allingawier Polder; 53°02′42″N 5°27′04″E		Before 1832	Demolished before 1929.	
Allingawier	Rijseterperpolder (noord); 53°02′32″N 5°27′42″E	Spinnenkopmolen	Between 1700 and 1720	Demolished 1923-24.	
Anjum	53°22′26″N 6°07′41″E	Molen van Anjum; Stellingmolen	1810	Burnt down 1889.	
Anjum	De Eendracht; 53°22′26″N 6°07′41″E	Stellingmolen	1889		
Anjum	Korenmolen van Anjum / Eanjum; 53°22′27″N 6°07′41″E	Standerdmolen	Before 1511	Demolished 1810.	
Appelscha	Molen van Jansen; 52°57′46″N 6°20′31″E	Standerdmolen	1852	Demolished c.1893.	
Appelscha	Molen van Mulder; 52°57′40″N 6°20′42″E	Stellingmolen	1891	Demolished 1914.	
Appelscha	Molen van Oud-Appelscha; Appeslsche Molen; 52°56′48″N 6°16′53″E	Standerdmolen	Before 1639	Demolished 1754.	
Appelscha	Molen van Oud-Appelscha; Appelsche Molen; 52°56′48″N 6°16′53″E	Standerdmolen	1754	Blown down 1869.	
Appelscha	Molen van Oud-Appelscha; Appelsche Molen; 52°56′48″N 6°16′53″E	Standerdmolen	1869	Demolished 1899.	
Appelscha	Polder 16; 52°56′22″N 6°21′37″E		Before 1877	Demolished before 1923.	
Arum	Busmolen; 53°07′44″N 5°28′22″E	Stellingmolen	1883	Burnt down 1909.	
Arum	De Duif; 53°07′31″N 5°27′56″E	Stellingmolen	1847	Demolished 1865.	
Arum	53°07′37″N 5°28′20″E	Standerdmolen	Before 1700	Demolished 1773.	
Arum	53°07′37″N 5°28′20″E	Stellingmolen	1773	Burnt down 1883.	
Arum	Polder 10; 53°07′44″N 5°28′09″E	Spinnenkopmolen	Before 1832	Demolished post-1850.	
Arum	Polder 11; 53°07′20″N 5°28′38″E		Before 1832	Demolished before 1850.	
Augsbuert-Lytsewâld	Molen van Cecelia Heemstra; 53°15′49″N 6°09′48″E		Before 1832	Demolished before 1850.	
Augsbuert-Lytsewâld	Polder 3; 53°15′55″N 6°09′57″E		Before 1832	Demolished before 1926.	
Augustinusga	Boktjasker; 53°13′11″N 6°10′30″E	Tjasker	1972		
Augustinusga	De Goede Verwachting	Stellingmolen	1871	Moved to Zaagwesteinde 1875.	
Augustinusga	Molen van Jan Nieuwenhuis; 53°13′16″N 6°10′24″E	Spinnenkopmolen	Before 1832	Demolished before 1850.	
Augustinusga	Polder Rohel; 53°13′25″N 6°09′17″E	Grondzeiler	1879	Burnt down 1910.	

=== B ===
Location	Name of mill	Type	Built	Notes	Photograph
Baaium	Baaiumer Poldermolen; Molen van Baiium; 53°09′35″N 5°38′07″E	Grondzeiler	Before 1832	Demolished 1935.	
Baaium	Windmotor Baaium; 53°09′48″N 5°37′55″E	Iron windpump	1935		
Baaium	Molen van Hans van der Meer; 53°09′45″N 5°38′48″E		Before 1832	Demolished before 1850.	
Baard	53°08′35″N 5°39′35″E		Before 1832	Demolished post-1850.	
Baard	Molen van Jan Agema; 53°08′33″N 5°40′25″E		Before 1832	Demolished before 1850.	
Baard	Polder 87; 53°08′30″N 5°39′20″E		Before 1832	Demolished 1904.	
Baard	Polder 88; 53°08′46″N 5°39′23″E	Grondzeiler	Before 1832	Demolished post-1928.	
Baard	Polder 89; 53°08′57″N 5°39′14″E	Grondzeiler	Before 1832	Demolished post-1932.	
Baard	Polder 96; 53°09′00″N 5°39′56″E		Before 1850	Demolished before 1929.	
Baard	Polder 97; 53°08′31″N 5°40′36″E		Before 1832	Demolished before 1928.	
Baard	Polder 98; 53°08′21″N 5°40′46″E		Before 1832	Demolished before 1928.	
Baard	Polder 99; 53°08′01″N 5°40′53″E		Before 1832	Demolished before 1929.	
Baard	Polder 100; 53°07′41″N 5°40′55″E		Before 1832	Demolished before 1929.	
Baard	Korenmolen van Baard; 53°08′33″N 5°40′01″E	Standerdmolen	Before 1692	Demolished 1856.	
Bakhuizen	Groenpoldermolen; De Wilde Vlucht; 52°52′05″N 5°26′39″E		Between 1832 and 1850	Demolished 1927.	
Bakhuizen	Groenpoldermolen; 52°52′08″N 5°26′50″E	Spinnenkopmolen	Before 1873	Demolished before 1930.	
Bakhuizen	Molen van Constantia Rengers; 52°52′13″N 5°27′10″E		Before 1832	Demolished before 1850.	
Bakhuizen	Molen van Cornelis Bouma; 52°52′01″N 5°27′02″E	Spinnenkopmolen	Before 1832	Demolished before 1850.	
Bakhuizen	Molen van Meine van der sluis 52°51′59″N 5°26′41″E	Spinnenkopmolen	Before 1832	Demolished before 1850.	
Bakkeveen	Ganzemeermolen; 53°03′41″N 6°15′51″E	Spinnenkopmolen	Before 1826	Demolished before 1887.	
Bakkeveen	Korenmolen van Bakkeveen; 53°04′37″N 6°14′59″E	Standerdmolen	built	Blown down 1582.	
Bakkeveen	Polder 13; 53°05′24″N 6°14′21″E		Before 1875	Demolished before 1925.	
Balk	52°54′00″N 5°35′08″E	Standerdmolen	Between 1664 and 1718	Demolished before 1877.	
Balk	De Vlijt; 52°54′00″N 5°35′08″E	Stellingmolen	1877	Demolished 1898.	
Balk	Korenmolen van Balk; 52°53′53″N 5°34′58″E	Standerdmolen	Before 1487	Demolished before 1547.	
Balk	Meerswalpoldermolen; 52.°N 5.°E	Grondzeiler	Before 1832	Demolished before 1929.	
Balk	Polder 33; 52°53′52″N 5°36′12″E	Spinnenkopmolen	Before 1832	Demolished before 1929.	
Balk	Landlustpoldermolen; 52°54′00″N 5°35′56″E	Spinnenkopmolen	Before 1832	Demolished before 1929.	
Balk	52.°N 5.°E	Spinnenkopmolen	1908	Demolished post-1929.	
Balk	Van Steenbergenpoldermolen; 52°53′47″N 5°34′59″E	Weidemolen	Before 1873	Demolished before 1929.	
Ballum	De Eendracht; De Eendragt; 53°26′08″N 5°40′25″E	Stellingmolen	Before 1558	Demolished 1842.	
Bartlehiem	Betlehemer Molen; 53°16′31″N 5°50′22″E	Standerdmolen	Before 1540	Demolished post-1718.	
Bartlehiem	Molen van Pieter Cats; 53°16′20″N 5°50′59″E		Before 1832	Demolished post-1850.	
Bartlehiem	Polder 19a 53°17′04″N 5°51′14″E		Before 1832	Demolished post-1850.	
Bartlehiem	Polder 20a 53°16′45″N 5°51′09″E		Before 1832	Demolished post-1850.	
Bartlehiem	Polder 113; 53°16′08″N 5°50′24″E		1850	Demolished before 1928.	
Bears	Korenmolen van Beers; 53°09′17″N 5°44′35″E		Before 1625	Demolished c.1739.	
Beetsterzwaag	Polder α 53°03′51″N 6°01′54″E	Spinnenkopmolen	Before 1832	Demolished post-1850.	
Beetsterzwaag	Polder β 53°03′39″N 6°02′19″E		Before 1877	Demolished before 1924.	
Beetsterzwaag	De Hoop; Molen van Weis; Moune fan Weis; 53°03′46″N 6°03′18″E	Stellingmolen	1874	Demolished c..	
Beetsterzwaag	Nieuwe Polder; Polder y 53°03′28″N 6°02′37″E		1844	Burnt down 1852.	
Beetsterzwaag	Nieuwe Polder; Polder de Phoenix; Polder y 53°03′28″N 6°02′37″E		1852	Demolished 1883.	
Beetsterzwaag	Oostersche Molen; 53°03′32″N 6°05′12″E	Standerdmolen	Before 1650	Demolished c.1820.	
Beetsterzwaag	Polder 8; 53°03′12″N 6°03′27″E	Spinnenkopmolen	Before 1832	Demolished post-1850.	
Beetsterzwaag	Polder 151; 53°02′34″N 6°03′53″E		Before 1877	Demolished before 1924.	
Beetsterzwaag	Rog Molen; 53°03′30″N 6°04′35″E	Standerdmolen	Before 1664	Demolished 1816.	
Beetsterzwaag	Trischmolen		1789	Demolished 1921.	
Beetsterzwaag	Westersche Molen; 53°03′22″N 6°04′36″E	Stellingmolen	1816	Demolished 1874.	
Berltsum	53°14′19″N 5°38′43″E	Stellingmolen	1851	Burnt down 1866.	
Berltsum	53°14′19″N 5°38′43″E	Stellingmolen	1866	Moved to Sint Jacobiparochie 1875.	
Berltsum	Korenmolen van Berlikum; 53°14′44″N 5°38′49″E	Standerdmolen	Before 1511	Burnt down 1572.	
Berltsum	Korenmolen van Berlikum; 53°14′44″N 5°38′49″E	Standerdmolen	1572	Demolished post-1739.	
Berltsum	Molen van Johannes Stienstra; 53°13′47″N 5°36′18″E	Spinnenkopmolen	Before 1832	Demolished before 1850.	
Berltsum	Ozingapolder; 53°13′31″N 5°36′52″E		Before 1832	Demolished post-1850.	
Berltsum	Polder 19; 53°14′50″N 5°38′20″E		Before 1873	Demolished post-1929.	
Berltsum	Polder 22; 53°13′44″N 5°37′37″E		Before 1832	Demolished post-1850.	
Berltsum	Polder 23; 53°13′51″N 5°37′23″E		Before 1832	Demolished post-1850.	
Berltsum	Polder 24; 53°13′53″N 5°36′33″E		Before 1832	Demolished post-1850.	
Berltsum	Polder 26; 53.°N 5.°E		Before 1832	Demolished before 1928.	
Berltsum	Polder Wijngaarden; 53°13′22″N 5°37′33″E		Before 1832	Demolished post-1850.	
Berltsum	53°14′33″N 5°38′26″E	Wip stellingmolen	1828	Demolished 1841.	
Berltsum	Zeldenrust; 53°14′33″N 5°38′26″E	Stellingmolen	1841	Burnt down 1842.	
Berltsum	De Hoop; 53°14′33″N 5°38′26″E	Stellingmolen	1843	Demolished 1930.	
Bitgummole	Beetgumermolen; 53°14′04″N 5°42′28″E	Standerdmolen	1542	Demolished 1760.	
Bitgummole	Beetgumernieuwland; 53°14′17″N 5°43′24″E	Grondzeiler	Before 1850	Demolished post-1928.	
Bitgummole	Molen van Groot Terhorne; 53°14′07″N 5°42′26″E	Stellingmolen	1772	Burnt down 1862.	
Blauwhuis	Molen van Douwe Douwma; 53°01′49″N 5°32′55″E	Spinnenkopmolen	Before 1832	Demolished before 1850.	
Blauwhuis	Molen van Ypeus Cuperus; 53°01′29″N 5°32′25″E	Spinnenkopmolen	Before 1832	Demolished before 1850.	
Blesdijke	De Linde	Achtkantmolen	1775	Moved to Noordwolde in 1836. De Hollandsche Molen (in Dutch)	
Blesdijke	Korenmolen van Blesdijke; 52°49′04″N 5°59′49″E	Standerdmolen	Before 1639	Demolished post-1652.	
Blesdijke	Milen van Albert Linstra; 52°50′49″N 5°58′43″E		Before 1832	Demolished post-1850.	
Blesdijke	Molen van Albert Linstra; 52°50′51″N 5°58′52″E	Spinnenkopmolen	Before 1832	Demolished before 1850.	
Blesdijke	Molen van Albert Linstra; 52°50′51″N 5°58′58″E		Before 1832	Demolished post-1850.	
Blesdijke	Molen van Jan Meerman; 52°51′02″N 5°59′38″E	Spinnenkopmolen	Before 1832	Demolished before 1850.	
Blesdijke	Nijkspolder; 52°50′56″N 5°59′17″E	Grondzeiler	1775	Moved to Noordwolde 1835.	
Blesdijke	Polder 121; 52°51′01″N 5°59′29″E		Before 1832	Demolished 1929.	
Blesdijke	Polder 122; 52°50′54″N 5°59′08″E	Spinnenkopmolen	Before 1887	Demolished post-1921.	
Blesdijke	52°50′24″N 6°00′33″E	Weidemolen	Before 1921		
Blesdijke	52°50′48″N 6°01′18″E	Weidemolen	Before 1921		
Blesdijke	52°50′44″N 6°00′04″E	Weidemolen	Before 1921		
Blesdijke	52°50′21″N 6°00′24″E		Before 1864	Demolished post-1926.	
Blesdijke	52°50′31″N 6°01′18″E	Weidemolen	Before 1921		
Blesdijke	52°50′43″N 6°01′13″E		Before 1926		
Blesdijke	52°50′24″N 6°00′30″E		Before 1864	Demolished post-1926.	
Blesdijke	52°50′31″N 5°58′58″E	Weidemolen	Before 1926		
Blesdijke	52°49′41″N 5°59′22″E	Weidemolen	Before 1864		
Blesdijke	52°51′04″N 5°59′45″E	Weidemolen	Before 1926		
Blesdijke	52°50′58″N 5°59′22″E	Weidemolen	Before 1850	Demolished post-1887.	
Blesdijke	52°51′04″N 5°59′40″E	Weidemolen	Before 1926		
Blesdijke	52°50′42″N 6°01′06″E	Weidemolen	Before 1921		
Blesdijke	52°50′49″N 6°01′02″E		Before 1926		
Blessum	Molen van Johannes van der Veen; 53°10′50″N 5°42′05″E	Spinnenkopmolen	Before 1832		
Blessum	Polder 63; 53°10′50″N 5°42′05″E	Grondzeiler	Before 1943	Demolished 1957.	
Blessum	Polder 74; Tjasker van Mulder; 53°10′50″N 5°41′35″E	Boktsjasker	Before 1873	Moved to Rijperkerk 1954.	
Blije	Blijasterpoldermolen; Blijerpoldermolen; 53°20′42″N 5°52′28″E	Grondzeiler	1818	Demolished 1931.	
Blije	Ferwerder-en Blijerpoldermolen; 53°21′11″N 5°50′55″E		Before 1874	Burnt down 1909.	
Blije	Het Lam; 53°21′08″N 5°51′52″E	Stellingmolen	1841	Demolished 1913.	
Blije	Korenmolen van Blija; 53.°N 5.°E	Standerdmolen	Before 1718	Demolished post-1832.	
Boarnwert	Molen van Pieter Cats; 53°20′06″N 5°57′40″E	Spinnenkopmolen	Before 1832	Demolished before 1930.	
Boarnwert	Waterschap de Foudgumer Kolken; 53°20′09″N 5°58′06″E		1872	Demolished before 1949.	
Boazum	Waterschap de Oosterweirumer Oudvaart; Kleiterpstermolen; 53°05′26″N 5°43′04″E	Iron windpump	1920		
Boazum	Molen van J. S. F. Schwartzenburg. 53°05′37″N 5°41′48″E		Before 1832	Demolished post-1850.	
Boazum	Molen van P. H. Wiersma; 53°05′12″N 5°40′59″E		Before 1832	Demolished before 1873.	
Boazum	Polder 231; 53°05′42″N 5°42′13″E		Between 1850 and 1873	Demolished before 1929.	
Boazum	Polder 232; 53°05′52″N 5°41′48″E		Before 1832	Demolished post-1850.	
Boazum	Polder 234; 53°05′58″N 5°41′33″E		Before 1832	Demolished before 1929.	
Boazum	Polder 239; 53°06′16″N 5°40′42″E		Before 1832	Demolished before 1928.	
Boazum	Polder 240; 53°06′03″N 5°41′01″E		Before 1832	Demolished before 1929.	
Boazum	Polder 241; 53°05′46″N 5°40′48″E		Before 1832	Demolished before 1929.	
Boazum	Polder 242; 53°05′46″N 5°41′12″E		Before 1832	Demolished before 1929.	
Boazum	Polder 243; 53°05′20″N 5°41′30″E		Between 1832 and 1850	Demolished before 1928.	
Boazum	Polder 244; 53°05′06″N 5°41′26″E		Before 1832	Demolished before 1929.	
Boazum	Polder 246; 53°05′21″N 5°40′43″E		Before 1832	Demolished before 1929.	
Boazum	Polder 247; 53°05′39″N 5°40′52″E		Before 1832	Demolished before 1929.	
Boazum	Polder 253; 53°05′31″N 5°42′43″E		Before 1832	Demolished before 1929.	
Boazum	Polder 254; 53°05′09″N 5°42′16″E		Before 1832	Demolished before 1929.	
Boazum	Polder 255; 53°04′56″N 5°00′00″E	Spinnenkopmolen	Before 1832	Demolished before 1929.	
Boazum	Polder 256; 53°04′39″N 5°41′46″E		Before 1832	Demolished before 1929.	
Boazum	Polder 257; 53°04′40″N 5°41′32″E	Spinnenkopmolen	Before 1832	Demolished 1922.	
Boazum	Polder 258; 53°04′21″N 5°40′58″E	Spinnenkopmolen	Between 1832 and 1850	Demolished 1922.	
Boazum	Polder 343; 53°06′14″N 5°40′17″E		Before 1832	Demolished before 1850.	
Boazum	53°05′15″N 5°41′37″E		183	Demolished post-1850.	
Boer	Polder 27; 53°13′11″N 5°34′22″E		Before 1832	Demolished post-1850.	
Boer	Polder 28; 53°13′21″N 5°34′46″E		Before 1832	Demolished post-1850.	
Boer	Polder 30; 53°12′57″N 5°33′28″E	Grondzeiler	Before 1832	Demolished post-1850.	
Boer	Polder 32; 53°12′49″N 5°33′26″E	Grondzeiler	Before 1832	Demolished post-1930.	
Boijl	Polder 15; 52°54′39″N 6°11′09″E	Weidemolen (grondzeiler)	Before 1854	Demolished post 1877.	
Boijl	Vulmolen; 52°55′36″N 6°11′27″E	Wipmolen	Before 1718	Demolished 1832.	
Boijl	Windt Molen van Beul; Koorn Molen; 52°55′34″N 6°11′47″E	Standerdmolen	Before 1664	Demolished post-1774.	
Boksum	Boxumer Nieuwland Poldermolen; 53°10′56″N 5°45′51″E	Grondzeiler	Before 1832	Burnt down during demolition 1931.	
Bolsward	Paaltjasker; 53°03′24″N 5°32′08″E	Tjasker	1976		
Bolsward	De Klaver, De Greate Klaver; 53°04′18″N 5°30′14″E	Spinnenkopmolen	1802		
Bolsward	Lonjé Molen; Tadema's Molen; 53°03′51″N 5°30′01″E	Grondzeiler	1824		
Bolsward		Achtkantmolen	1728	Demolished 1821.	
Bolsward		Achtkantmolen	1821	Demolished 1956, base remains.	
Bolsward	De Haan; 53°03′45″N 5°30′56″E	Stellingmolen	1659	Demolished 1874.	
Bolsward	De Hoop; 53°04′01″N 5°31′32″E	Stellingmolen	1708	Burnt down 1899.	
Bolsward	De Hoop; Molen van Hiddema; 53°04′01″N 5°31′32″E	Stellingmolen	1900	Demolished 1921. Base demolished 1968.	
Bolsward		Stellingmolen	Before 1648	Demolished post-1761.	
Bolsward	Korenmolen van Bolsward; 53°03′48″N 5°31′13″E	Standerdmolen	Before 1503	Demolished 1668.	
Bolsward	Molen van Evert Yntema; 53°04′34″N 5°30′16″E	Spinnenkopmolen	Before 1832	Demolished 1846.	
Bolsward	Molen van Gebroeders Schoonhoff; 53°04′06″N 5°31′33″E	Stellingmolen	1765	Demolished 1921.	
Bolsward	Molen van Lolle van der Meulen; 53°04′13″N 5°30′23″E	Spinnenkopmolen	Before 1832	Demolished 1892.	
Bolsward	Molen van Petrus Gosslinga; 53°03′57″N 5°30′54″E	Spinnenkopmolen	Before 1832	Demolished before 1850.	
Bolsward	Molen van Wijbe Wijbes; 53°03′31″N 5°30′19″E	Spinnenkopmolen	Before 1832	Demolished post-1850.	
Bolsward	53°03′45″N 5°30′50″E	Wipmolen	1611	Demolished 1677.	
Bolsward	53°04′06″N 5°31′33″E		Before 1711	Demolished c.1761.	
Bolsward	Polder 393; 53°04′22″N 5°32′44″E	Spinnenkopmolen	Before 1832	Demolished 1949.	
Bolsward	Polder 394; Molen van R. Wijnbrandij; 53°04′25″N 5°32′03″E	Grondzeiler	1813	Demolished 1946.	
Bolsward	Polder 395; De Witte Molen; 53°04′05″N 5°32′32″E	Spinnenkopmolen	1705	Demolished 1949, base remained until demolished 2000.	
Bolsward	Polder 401; 53°03′14″N 5°32′23″E	Spinnenkopmolen	Before 1832	Demolished post-1930.	
Bolsward	Polder 406; 53°03′06″N 5°32′28″E	Spinnenkopmolen	Before 1832	Demolished post-1945.	
Bolsward	Polder 407; Molen van Elzinga; 53°03′06″N 5°31′43″E	Spinnenkopmolen	Before 1832	Demolished between 1943 and 1949.	
Bolsward	Polder 409; 53°03′22″N 5°31′06″E	Spinnenkopmolen	Before 1832	Demolished before 1929.	
Bolsward	Polder 413; 53°03′35″N 5°30′42″E	Spinnenkopmolen	Before 1832	Demolished before 1929.	
Bolsward	Polder 414; 53°03′44″N 5°29′50″E	Spinnenkopmolen	Before 1832	Demolished before 1929.	
Bolsward	Polder 417; Roohelpoldermolen; 53.°N 5.°E	Grondzeiler	1728	Burnt down 1906. Base demolished 1998.	
Bolsward	Polder 420; 53°04′34″N 5°30′16″E	Grondzeiler	1846	Demolished post-1943.	
Bolsward	53°04′21″N 5°31′12″E		Before 1931	Demolished before 1949.	
Bolsward	Schelte Moelen	Standerdmolen	Before 1543	Demolished before 1548.	
Bolsward	Staarttjasker bij Bolsward; 53°03′40″N 5°31′40″E	Staarttjasker	Before 1664		
Bolsward	Stadspoldermolen; De Groote Molen; 53°03′49″N 5°32′24″E	Spinnenkopmolen	1795	Demolished before 1930.	
Bolsward	53°03′45″N 5°30′50″E	Standerdmolen	1547	Moved post-1592.	
Bolsward		Standerdmolen		Burnt down 1487.	
Bolsward	53°04′12″N 5°31′32″E	Standerdmolen	Before 1560	Probably moved within Bolsward before 1718.	
Bolsward	53°03′44″N 5°31′03″E	Standerdmolen		Demolished 1542.	
Bolsward	53°04′01″N 5°31′32″E	Standerdmolen	Between 1560 and 1616	Moved within Bolsward post-1708.	
Bolsward	53°03′45″N 5°30′56″E	Standerdmolen	1542	Blown down 1659.	
Bolsward	53.°N 5.°E	Standerdmolen	Before 1560	Moved with Bolsward 1616.	
Bolsward	53°03′40″N 5°31′05″E	Stellingmolen	1724	Deolished 1791.	
Boornbergum	Molen van Jacob van der Velde; 53°04′52″N 6°01′56″E		Before 1832	Demolished before 1850.	
Boornbergum	Polder 221; 53°04′59″N 6°01′46″E		Before 1876	Demolished before 1924.	
Boornbergum	Polder 221a 53°05′32″N 6°01′13″E		Before 1876	Demolished before 1924.	
Boornbergum	Polder 222; 53°04′45″N 6°01′52″E		Before 1876	Demolished before 1924.	
Boornbergum	Polder 223; 53°04′48″N 6°02′20″E		Before 1876	Demolished before 1924.	
Boornbergum	Polder 224; 53°04′44″N 6°02′26″E		Before 1876	Demolished before 1924.	
Boornbergum	Polder 225; 53°04′31″N 6°02′43″E		Before 1876	Demolished before 1924.	
Boornbergum	53°05′06″N 6°02′45″E	Stellingmolen	1898	Demolished post-1916.	
Boornzwaag	Polder 186; 52°57′36″N 5°44′50″E		1908	Demolished post-1929.	
Boornzwaag	52°57′35″N 5°45′54″E		Before 1908	Demolished before 1922.	
Boornzwaag	52°57′31″N 5°45′56″E		Before 1908	Demolished post-1922.	
Boornzwaag	52°57′39″N 5°00′00″E	Spinnenkopmolen		Demolished c.1735.	
Boornzwaag	52°57′31″N 5°44′13″E	Spinnenkopmolen		Demolished c.1735.	
Boornzwaag	52°57′32″N 5°44′11″E	Spinnenkopmolen		Demolished c.1735.	
Boornzwaag	52°57′35″N 5°44′15″E	Spinnenkopmolen		Demolished c.1735.	
Boornzwaag	52°57′36″N 5°44′29″E	Spinnenkopmolen		Demolished c.1735.	
Boornzwaag	52°57′35″N 5°44′15″E	Spinnenkopmolen		Demolished c.1735.	
Britsum	Grote Oudlansche Poldermolen; Stienser Oudland Molen; 53°15′23″N 5°48′01″E	Grondzeiler	1841	Demolished 1929.	
Britsum	Molen van Jan Bruinsma; 53°15′22″N 5°47′58″E	Spinnenkopmolen	Before 1832	Demolished before 1850.	
Britsum	Molen van Johan van Idsinga; 53°15′13″N 5°48′18″E	Spinnenkopmolen	Before 1832	Demolished before 1850.	
Britsum	Polder 4 Geldersche Hoekmolen; 53°15′19″N 5°49′27″E		Before 1850	Demolished before 1928.	
Britsum	Polder 5; 53°15′15″N 5°49′08″E	Spinnenkopmolen	Before 1832	Demolished before 1928.	
Britsum	Polder 6; 53°15′17″N 5°48′16″E	Spinnenkopmolen	Before 1832	Demolished before 1928.	
Britsum	Polder 7; 53°15′23″N 5°47′38″E		1850	Demolished before 1928.	
Britsum	Polder 7a 53°15′17″N 5°46′42″E		Between 1850 and 1873	Demolished before 1929.	
Britsum	53°15′23″N 5°48′19″E		Before 1850	Demolished before 1928.	
Britswert	Molen van Bontje van der Valk; 53°07′00″N 5°39′49″E		Before 1832	Demolished before 1850.	
Britswert	Polder 79; 53°07′05″N 5°39′54″E		Between 1832 and 1850	Demolished before 1929.	
Britswert	Polder 80; 53°06′56″N 5°40′26″E		Before 1832	Demolished before 1929.	
Britswert	Polder 81; 53°07′03″N 5°40′31″E		Before 1832	Demolished before 1929.	
Britswert	Polder 236; 53°06′28″N 5°40′38″E		Before 1832	Demolished before 1929.	
Britswert	Polder 237; 53°06′33″N 5°40′17″E		Before 1832	Demolished before 1929.	
Britswert	Polder 344; 53°06′41″N 5°39′51″E	Spinnenkopmolen	Before 1832	Burnt down 1934.	
Broek	Molen van Jacobus Jongbloed; 52°59′40″N 5°46′14″E	Tjasker	Before 1832	Demolished post-1932.	
Broek	Molen van Jan Bouwma; 52°58′05″N 5°46′32″E		Before 1832	Demolished before 1850.	
Broek	Molen van Johannes Tuimelaar; 52°57′56″N 5°46′30″E	Spinnenkopmolen	Before 1832	Demolished post-1930.	
Broek	Molen van Martinus van Vierssen; 52°58′01″N 5°46′31″E	Spinnenkopmolen	Before 1832	Demolished before 1850.	
Broek	Molen van Sjoerd de Vries; 52°59′08″N 5°46′34″E	Spinnenkopmolen	Before 1832	Demolished post-1850.	
Broek	Molen van Tjebbe Dijkstra; 52°58′07″N 5°46′44″E	Spinnenkopmolen	Before 1832	Demolished post-1850.	
Broek	Molen van Yde Peekema; 52°59′07″N 5°46′39″E	Spinnenkopmolen	Before 1832	Demolished before 1850.	
Broek	Polder 50; 52°57′42″N 5°46′44″E	Spinnenkopmolen	Before 1832	Demolished before 1929.	
Broek	Polder 59; 52°58′12″N 5°46′40″E		Before 1832	Demolished before 1929.	
Broek	Polder 60; 52°58′23″N 5°46′44″E	Spinnenkopmolen	Before 1832	Demolished before 1929.	
Broek	Polder 61; 52°58′22″N 5°46′42″E	Spinnenkopmolen	Before 1832	Demolished post-1930.	
Broek	Polder 62; 52°58′30″N 5°46′45″E	Spinnenkopmolen	Before 1832	Demolished before 1929.	
Broek	Polder 63; 52°58′38″N 5°46′42″E	Spinnenkopmolen	Before 1750	Demolished before 1929.	
Broek	Polder 64; 52°58′52″N 5°47′04″E	Spinnenkopmolen	Before 1832	Demolished before 1929.	
Broek	Polder 65; 52°59′16″N 5°47′00″E	Spinnenkopmolen	Before 1750	Demolished post-1929.	
Broek	Polder 66; 52.°N 5.°E	Spinnenkopmolen	Before 1832	Demolished post-1929.	
Broek	Polder 181; 52°59′00″N 5°46′34″E	Spinnenkopmolen	Before 1832	Demolished before 1929.	
Broek	Polder 182; 52°58′52″N 5°46′34″E	Spinnenkopmolen	Before 1832	Demolished before 1929.	
Broek	Polder 184; 52°58′05″N 5°46′18″E		Before 1832	Demolished before 1929.	
Broek	Polder naast Polder 184; 52°58′07″N 5°46′30″E		Before 1850	Demolished before 1930.	
Broek	Polder de Vries; 52°59′07″N 5°47′01″E		Before 1930	Demolished before 1952.	
Broek	52°58′25″N 5°47′06″E	Spinnenkopmolen	Before 1700	Demolished before 1832.	
Broek	52°58′18″N 5°46′42″E	Spinnenkopmolen	Before 1700	Demolished before 1832.	
Broek	52°03′56″N 5°46′51″E	Spinnenkopmolen	Before 1700	Demolished before 1832.	
Broek	52°57′55″N 5°46′40″E	Spinnenkopmolen	Before 1700	Demolished before 1832.	
Broek	52°57′57″N 5°46′42″E	Spinnenkopmolen	Before 1700	Demolished before 1832.	
Broek	52°58′14″N 5°46′51″E	Spinnenkopmolen	Before 1700	Demolished before 1832.	
Broek	52°57′49″N 5°46′41″E	Spinnenkopmolen	Before 1700	Demolished before 1832.	
Broek	52°58′21″N 5°46′55″E	Spinnenkopmolen	Before 1700	Demolished before 1832.	
Broek	52°59′08″N 5°47′01″E	Spinnenkopmolen	Before 1700	Demolished before 1832.	
Broek	52°58′53″N 5°46′56″E	Spinnenkopmolen	Before 1700	Demolished before 1832.	
Broek	52°58′52″N 5°47′00″E	Spinnenkopmolen	Before 1700	Demolished before 1832.	
Broeksterwâld	De Broekmolen; 53°16′34″N 5°58′39″E	Grondzeiler	1876		
Broeksterwâld	53°16′01″N 5°58′15″E		1879	Burnt down 1888.	
Broeksterwâld	Grutte Mûne; 53°16′01″N 5°58′15″E	Grondzeiler	1888		
Broeksterwâld	Molen van Gerben Boksma; 53°15′36″N 5°59′30″E		Before 1832	Demolished before 1850.	
Broeksterwâld	Molen van Jan Visser; 53°15′50″N 5°59′35″E		Before 1832	Demolished before 1850.	
Buitenpost	De Mûnts; 53°15′04″N 6°08′09″E	Grondzeiler	1959		
Buitenpost	Korenmolen van Buitenpost; 53°15′09″N 6°08′53″E	Standerdmolen	Before 1639	Demolished 1755.	
Buitenpost	Molen Hoekstra; 53°15′09″N 6°08′53″E	Stellingmolen	1755	Demolished 1947, base demolished 1961.	
Buitenpost	Molen van Dirk Kuipers; 53°15′31″N 6°09′27″E	Spinnenkopmolen	Before 1832	Demolished before 1850.	
Buitenpost	Molen van Klass Gorter; 53°14′07″N 6°08′42″E	Spinnenkopmolen	Before 1832	Demolished before 1850.	
Buitenpost	Molen van Klass Heidema; 53°15′35″N 6°09′31″E	Spinnenkopmolen	Before 1832	Demolished before 1850.	
Buitenpost	Molen van Kornelis van Haersma de With; 53°15′41″N 6°09′06″E	Spinnenkopmolen	Before 1832	Demolished before 1850.	
Buitenpost	Molen van Mindert Scheepstra; 53°14′03″N 6°08′40″E	Spinnenkopmolen	Before 1832	Demolished before 1850.	
Buitenpost	Molen van Ruurd van der Meer; 53°13′34″N 6°08′02″E	Spinnenkopmolen	Before 1832	Before 1850.	
Buitenpost	Polder 1; 53°14′58″N 6°08′30″E	Spinnenkopmolen	Before 1832	Demolished before 1926.	
Buitenpost	Polder 2; 53.°N 6.°E	Grondzeiler	Before 1850	Demolished c.1920.	
Buitenpost	53°14′51″N 6°08′58″E		1841	Burnt down 1858.	
Buitenpost	name 53°14′51″N 6°08′58″E	Stellingmolen	1858	Demolished 1925.	
Burdaard	De Olifant; 53°16′49″N 5°52′38″E	Grondzeiler	1867		
Burdaard	De Windlust; 53°17′45″N 5°52′52″E	Stellingmolen	1841	Burnt down 1874.	
Burdaard	Windmotor Burdaard	Iron windpump			
Burdaard	De Zwaluw; 53°17′45″N 5°52′53″E	Stellingmolen	1875	Burnt down 1972.	
Burdaard	De Zwaluw; 53°17′45″N 5°52′53″E	Stellingmolen	1988		
Burdaard	Traitable; 53°17′37″N 5°52′35″E	Stellingmolen	1855	Burnt down 1864.	
Burdaard	De Phoenix; 53°17′37″N 5°52′35″E	Stellingmolen	1865	Burnt down 1918.	
Burdaard	Molen van Ciprianus van der Veen; 53°17′25″N 5°53′32″E	Spinnenkopmolen	Before 1832	Demolished before 1850.	
Burdaard	Molen van Jacob Kooystra; 53°16′57″N 5°52′29″E		Before 1832	Demolished post-1850.	
Molen van Jan Tilsma	name 53°17′18″N 5°53′11″E		Before 1832	Demolished post-1850.	
Burdaard	Molen van Marten Hellinga; 53°17′48″N 5°54′05″E	Spinnenkopmolen	Before 1832	Demolished post-1850.	
Burdaard	Molen van Philippes Nassau; 53°16′45″N 5°53′00″E	Spinnenkopmolen	Before 1832	Demolished post-1850.	
Burdaard	Polder 29; Waterschap Kolkhuizen; Spookmolen; Spûkemole; 53°17′36″N 5°53′31″E	Grondzeiler	1850	Demolished 1966.	
Burdaard	Polder 30; 53°17′44″N 5°53′18″E	Grondzeiler	1810	Demolished 1950.	
Burgum	De Broeders; 53°11′04″N 5°59′32″E	Stellingmolen	1784	Demolished 1911.	
Burgum	De Goede Verwachting; 53°11′16″N 5°59′36″E	Paltrokmolen	1811	Demolished 1882.	
Burgum	Eekmolen; 53°11′04″N 5°59′32″E		Between 1770 and 1772	Burnt down 1782.	
Burgum	Korenmolen van Burgum; 53°11′31″N 6°00′07″E	Standerdmolen	Before 1581	Demolished post-1850.	
Burgum	Molen van Aalfs; 53°11′03″N 5°59′38″E	Stellingmolen	1905	Demolished 1926. Base demolished 1995.	
Burgum	Molen van Dourma; 53°11′31″N 6°00′07″E	Standerdmolen	1750	Demolished 1920.	
Burgum	Molen van Lieppe Kuipers; 53°11′10″N 5°59′41″E	Spinnenkopmolen	Before 1832	Demolished before 1850.	
Burgum	Molen van Okke Bosgra; 53°11′44″N 6°00′18″E	Spinnenkopmolen	Before 1832	Demolished before 1850.	
Burgum	53°11′04″N 5°59′32″E		Before 1734	Burnt down 1770.	
Burgum	Polder 147; 53°11′46″N 6°01′32″E		Before 1854	Demolished c.1928.	
Burgum	Polder 148; 53°11′35″N 6°01′08″E		Before 1854	Demolished before 1926.	
Burgum	Polder 149 <Oegefintsje; Jan Slapgatsmûne; 53°11′36″N 6°00′37″E	Spinnenkopmolen	Before 1832	Demolished between 1930 and 1940.	
Burgum	Polder 150; 53°11′39″N 6°00′32″E		Before 1832	Demolished c.1928.	
Burgum	Polder 151br>Molen van Winters; 53°11′12″N 6°00′18″E	Spinnenkopmolen	Between 1832 and 1850	Demolished post-World War II.	
Burgum	Polder 152; 53°11′16″N 6°00′10″E		Before 1854	Demolished before 1926.	
Burgum	Polder 153; 53°11′22″N 5°59′05″E		Before 1854	Demolished before 1926.	
Burgum	Polder 176; 53°12′30″N 6°01′40″E		Before 1854	Demolished before 1926.	
Burgwerd	Molen van de Tjaard	Grondzeiler	1846	Burnt down 9 November 1959; Molendatabase (in Dutch); De Hollandsche Molen (in Dutch)	
Burgwerd	Aylvapoldermolen; 53°05′52″N 5°33′34″E	Grondzeiler	2000		
Burgwerd	De Hiemerter Mole; 53°06′00″N 5°31′08″E	Spinnenkopmolen	1975		
Burgwerd	Molen van de Armvoogdij; 53°05′16″N 5°32′41″E	Spinnenkopmolen	Before 1832	Demolished 1903.	
Burgwerd	Molen van Foppe Terenstra; 53°05′23″N 5°32′21″E		1832	Demolished 1894.	
Burgwerd	Molen van Gosse Bootsma; 53°05′26″N 5°32′03″E	Spinnenkopmolen	Before 1832	Demolished c.1880.	
Burgwerd	Molen van Marten Stiensma; Auke Murks Molen; 53.°N 5.°E	Spinnenkopmolen	Before 1832	Demolished 1900.	
Burgwerd	Polder 373; 53°05′04″N 5°33′45″E	Spinnenkopmolen	1890	Demolished 1935, base demolisched c.1975.	
Burgwerd	Polder 374; 53°05′22″N 5°33′35″E	Spinnenkopmolen	Before 1832	Demolished c.1966.	
Burgwerd	Polder 374a 53°05′21″N 5°33′01″E		Before 1850	Demolished before 1929.	
Burgwerd	Polder 388; 53°05′08″N 5°32′43″E	Tjasker	1876	Demolished 1915.	
Burgwerd	Polder 389; 53°04′39″N 5°33′52″E	Spinnenkopmolen	Before 1832	Blown down 1929, base demolished 1932.	
Burgwerd	Polder 391; 53°04′55″N 5°32′30″E	Grondzeiler	Between 1832 and 1850	Demolished c.1955.	
Burgwerd	Polder 391a 53°04′54″N 5°33′21″E	Spinnenkopmolen	Before 1832	Demolished 1915.	
Burgwerd	Polder 392; 53°04′42″N 5°32′10″E	Spinnenkopmolen	Before 1832	Demolished 1939.	
Burgwerd	Polder 393a Zeldenrust; 53°04′30″N 5°33′03″E	Grondzeiler	Before 1832	Demolished before 1950.	
Burgwerd	Polder 428; 53°05′11″N 5°32′28″E	Grondzeiler	Before 1832	Demolished before 1929.	
Burgwerd	Polder 429; 53°05′24″N 5°32′16″E	Grondzeiler	Before 1832	Demolished between 1896 and 1913.	
Burgwerd	Polder 430; 53°05′32″N 5°32′05″E	Spinnenkopmolen	Before 1832	Demolished between 1939 and 1942.	
Burgwerd	Polder 430a 53°06′03″N 5°32′08″E	Spinnenkopmolen	Before 1832	Demolished 1915.	
Burgwerd	Tjaard van Aylverpolder Molen 1; 53°05′29″N 5°33′10″E	Grondzeiler	1680	Demolished before 1859.	
Burgwerd	53°05′52″N 5°33′34″E	Spinnenkopmolen	1680	Demolished 1827.	
Burgwerd	Tjaard van Aylverpolder Molen 2; 53°05′52″N 5°33′34″E	Grondzeiler	1827	Burnt down 1959.	
Burum	Windlust; 53°16′27″N 6°13′55″E	Stellingmolen	1787	Burnt down 2012.	
Burum	Windlust; 53°16′27″N 6°13′55″E	Stellingmolen	2014		
Burum	Kolen van Burum; 53°16′27″N 6°13′55″E	Standerdmolen	Before 1565	Burnt down 1785.	

=== C ===
Location	Name of mill	Type	Built	Notes	Photograph
Cornwerd	De Cornwerdermolen; 53°04′46″N 5°24′06″E	Grondzeiler	1907		
Cornwerd	Cornwerderpolder; 53°04′50″N 5°24′03″E		Before 1850	Demolished before 1907.	
Cornwerd	Houwpolder; 53°05′25″N 5°23′17″E	Grondzeiler	Before 1832	Demolished 1918.	
Cornwerd	Polder 16; 53°04′36″N 5°23′35″E	Grondzeiler	1864	Demolished before 1930.	
Cornwerd	Polder 17; 53°04′36″N 5°23′36″E	Grondzeiler	1864	Demolished before 1930.	

== Notes ==
Mills still standing marked in bold. Known building dates are bold, otherwise the date is the earliest known date the mill was standing.
