= De Vlijt, Koudum =

Windmill in Koudum, Netherlands

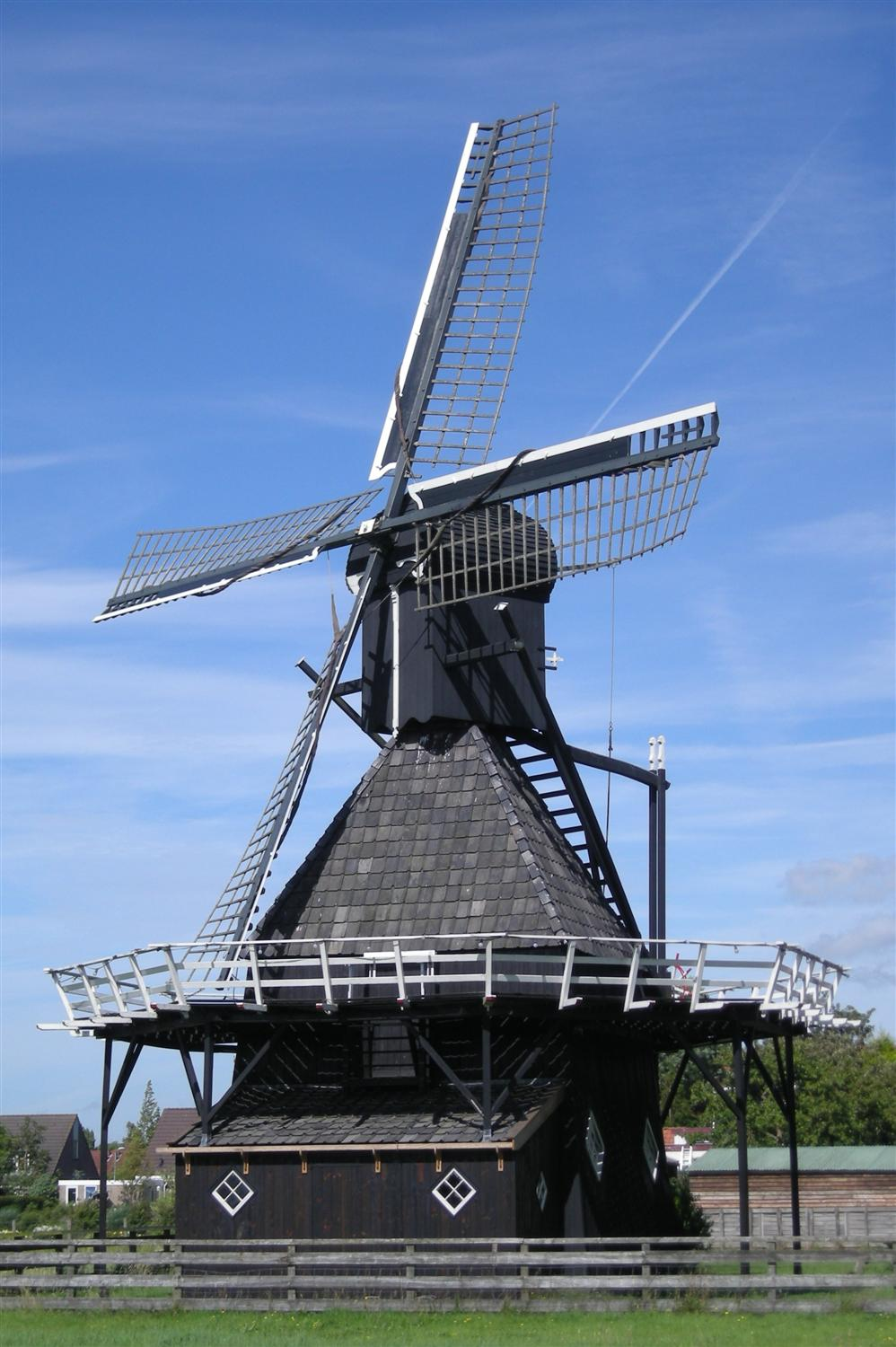
- De Vlijt, January 2007

Origin
- Mill name: De Vlijt; Molen 't Op
- Mill location: Bij Molenbuurt 14, 8723 BT Koudum
- Coordinates: 52°54′43″N 5°26′31″E
- Operator(s): Molenstichting Nijefurd
- Year built: 1986

Information
- Purpose: Corn mill
- Type: Post mill
- Roundhouse storeys: Two storey roundhouse
- No. of sails: Four sails
- Type of sails: Common sails
- Windshaft: Cast iron
- Winding: Tailpole and winch
- No. of pairs of millstones: One pair of millstones
- Size of millstones: 1.30 metres (4 ft 3 in) diameter

De Vlijt (English: The Diligence) or Molen 't Op is a post mill in Koudum, Friesland, Netherlands which was built in 1986 and is working in working order. The mill is listed as a Rijksmonument, number 34081.

== History ==
The first mention of a mill on this site was its appearance on a map of Koudum in 1718. In 1823, a rye, barley and mustard mill was advertised for sale. The mill had sails with a span of 22.60 metres (74 ft 2 in) and a stage at a height of 7.10 metres (23 ft 4 in). It was valued at over ƒ5,500 The mill was owned by Heerke Reinders Heerkens and was sold to Hendrik Gerrits van der Meulen. In 1830, the mill is shown with an octagonal plan, which may indicate that it was a smock mill. In 1832, it was sold to Peter Tjebbes of Stavoren. He died in 1833 and the mill passed to his widow Durkje Reinders Visser. She sold the mill in 1839 for ƒ6,064 to Harman van der Sluis Meines of Bakhuizen. In 1859, the mill was owned by P L van der Wal, who advertised for an miller's assistant in the Leeuwarden Courant that year. In 1863, the mill was in the ownership of Otto Peter de Jong. It burnt down on 7 November 1863.

On 6 December 1864, a drainage mill was offered for sale in the Leeuwarden Courant. The mill was moved from Joure to Koudum to replace the mill which had burnt down. Owner Sipke Voskuil offered the mill for sale in the Leeuwarden Courant of 20 October 1871. The mill was known as De Vlijt, or the Molen van Ferwerda. A steam engine was installed in 1932. the mill lost a pair of sails in 1934. It was demolished in 1938.

The present mill was originally a polder mill built in the 18th century at Sneek, where it was known as Molen 't Op. It had drained the Oppenhuisterpolder until 1947. The mill was bought by Stichting De Fryske Mole (Frisian Mills Foundation) on 19 May 1981. In 1986, it was decided to move 't Op to Koudum as the mill was surrounded by industrial buildings. Parts from other mills were used in the restoration. The great spur wheel was originally in De Grote Molen, Broeksterwâld, while the millstones were originally in a mill at Langweer. The stone crane came from a mill at Geldermalsen, Gelderland. The mill stands some 30 metres (33 yd) from the site of the original mill. The rebuilt mill was officially opened in May 1995. The mill is now owned by the Molenstichting Nijefurd (Nijefurd Mills Foundation).

== Description ==
De Vlijt is what the Dutch describe as a "spinnenkop stellingmolen" . It is a hollow post mill on a two-storey roundhouse, there is a stage at second-floor level, 4.50 metres (14 ft 9 in) above ground level. The roundhouse, buck and roof of the mill are covered in boards and tarred. The roundhouse roof is covered in shingles. The mill is winded by tailpole and winch. The sails are Common sails. They have a span of 16.40 metres (53 ft 10 in). The sails are carried on a cast-iron windshaft, which was cast in 1986 by Fabrikaat IJzergieterij Hardinxveld-Giessendam of Hardinxveld-Giessendam, South Holland. The windshaft also carries the brake wheel, which has 39 cogs. This drives the wallower (20 cogs) at the top of the upright shaft. At the bottom of the upright shaft, the great spur wheel, which has 50 cogs. The great spur wheel drives a pair of 1.30 metres (4 ft 3 in) diameter Cullen millstones via lantern pinion stone nut which has 18 staves.

== Millers ==
- Heerke Reinder Heerkens ( -1823)
- Hendrik Gerrits van der Meulen (1823–32)
- Peter Tjebbes (1832–33)
- Durkje Reinders Visser (1833–39)
- Harmen van der Sluis Meines (1839- )
- P L van der Wal (1859)
- Otto Peter de Jong ( -1863)
- Sipke Voskuil (1865–71)
- Ferwerda ( -1938)

Reference for above:-

== Public access ==
De Vlijt is open to the public by appointment.
