= Feanwâlden =

Feanwâlden Veenwouden
- Village
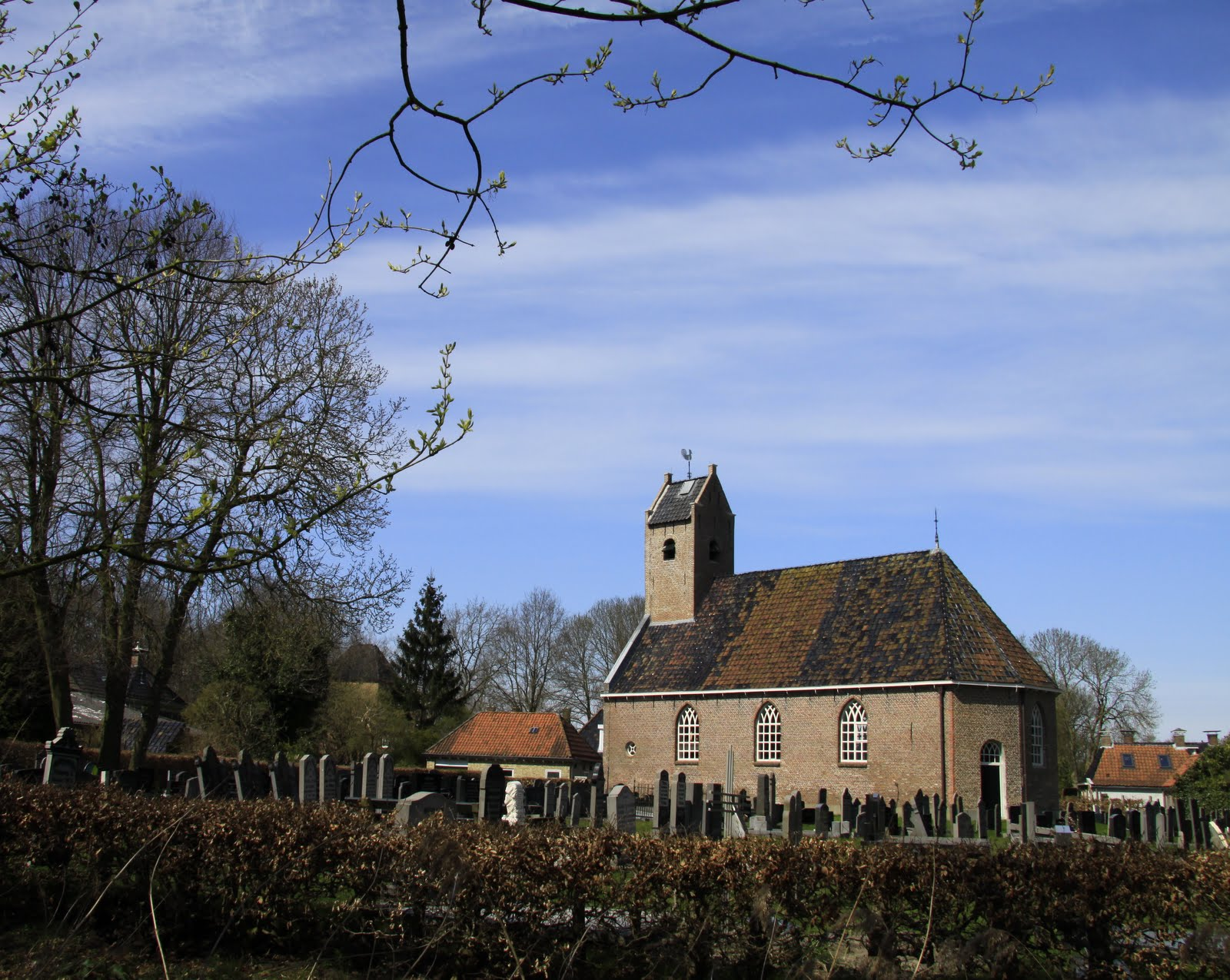
- Church of St John

- Flag Coat of arms

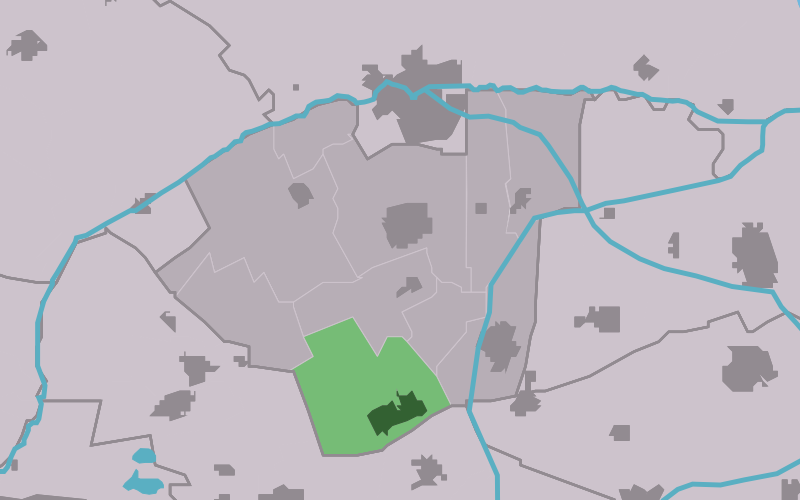
- Location in Dantumadiel municipality

- Location in the Netherlands Feanwâlden (Netherlands)
- Country: Netherlands
- Province: Friesland
- Municipality: Dantumadiel

Population (2017)
  - Total: 3,430
- Time zone: UTC+1 (CET)
  - Summer (DST): UTC+2 (CEST)

Feanwâlden (Dutch: Veenwouden) is a village in the Dantumadiel municipality of Friesland, the Netherlands. It had a population of around 3,430 in 2014.

Together with the village of Feanwâldsterwâl, a former hamlet of Feanwâlden, it has a village interest association group under the name: Vereniging van Dorpsbelangen Veenwouden / Veenwoudsterwal e.o..

== History ==
Feanwâlden originated from two small villages, Sint-Johanneswâld and Eslawâld. The first was near the Skierstins while the second place was a mile further southwest. Sint-Johanneswâld was mentioned in 1439 as Sunte Johannis walde and 1450 as Sunte Johanneswald. Eslawâld was mentioned in 1450 as Essalawald. In 1421 there was also a mention of Lillingwald, possibly also referring to Eslawâld, as in a shortened version of es(se)lingawald but it may have been a third and later disappeared place in the area at the southern edge of a vast peatland.

The two places would have merged around 1500. In 1542 it was mentioned as Feenwalde, in 1573 Veenwolden, in 1664 Veenwolde and 1786 Veenwoude and Feenwoude.

The merger would have come about because Eslawald had to be partly closed due to the flooding caused by the peat extraction. The Cistercian monastery Klaarkamp was already working on this before 1436, the Skierstins had been recruited by the monastery for this. The occupation that remained of Eslawâld was still referred to in 1623 as Iselwolde.

For a long time, the village was a thin but elongated village, but in the course of the 19th century and 20th century, then known as Veenwouden, it grew considerably. It has also had its own train station for some time. In 2008 the municipality Dantumadiel decided that it was going the replace all the official Dutch names within the municipality with the West Frisian names, so that Feanwâlden became the official name of the village in 2009.

== Notable buildings ==
- The Skierstins

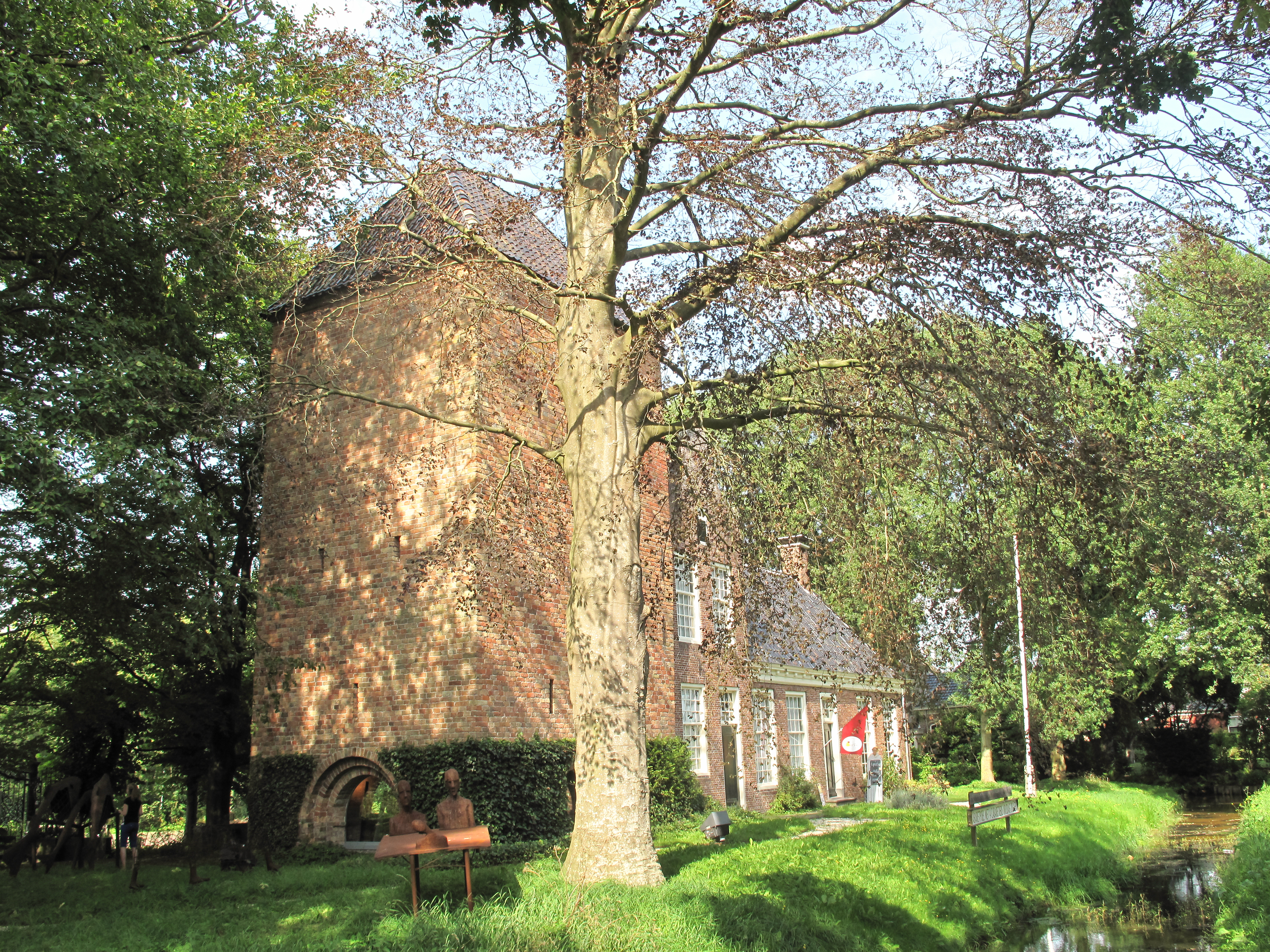
Castle Skierstins

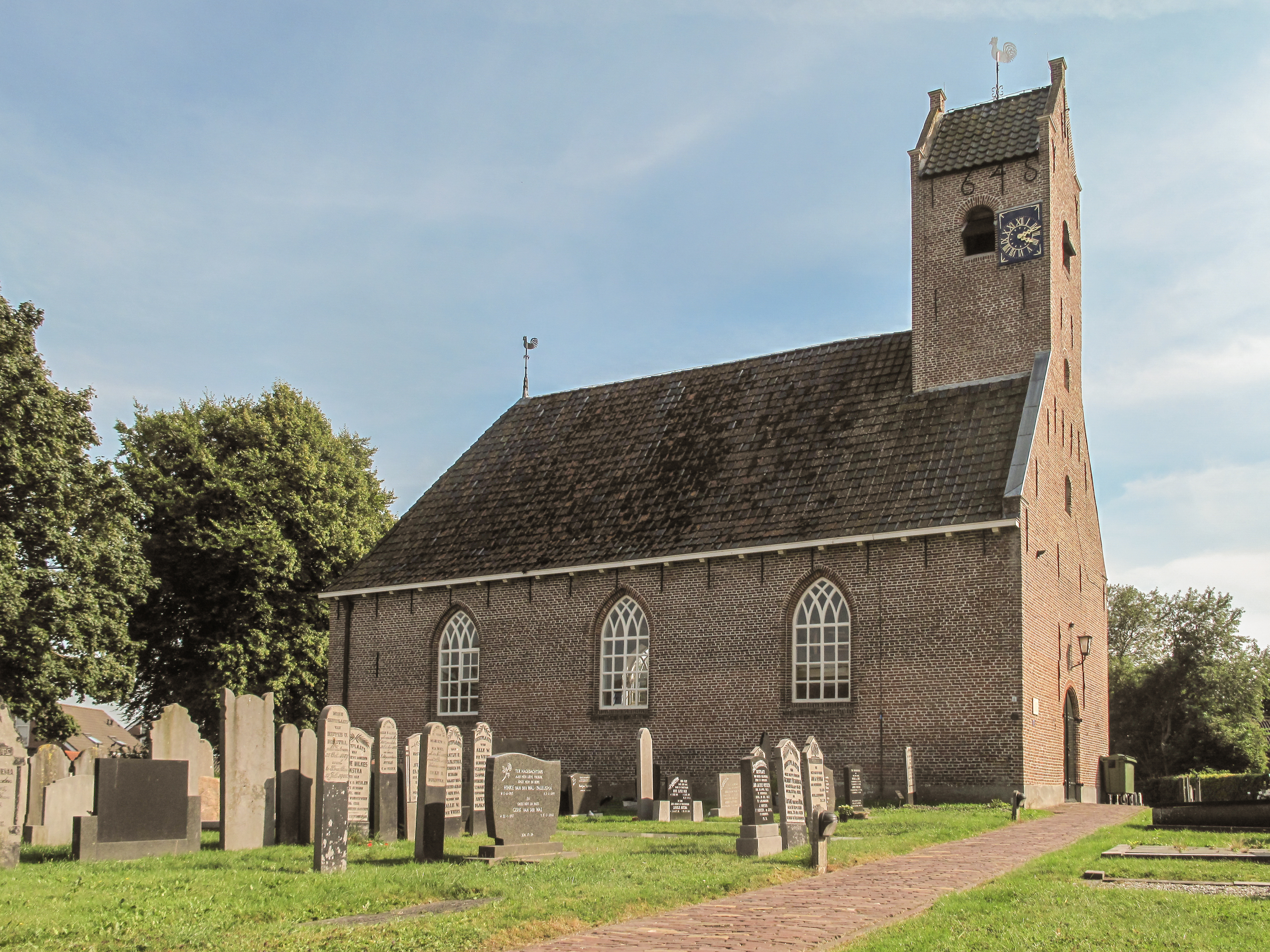
Church of St John
