= De Falom =

De Falom De Valom
- Village
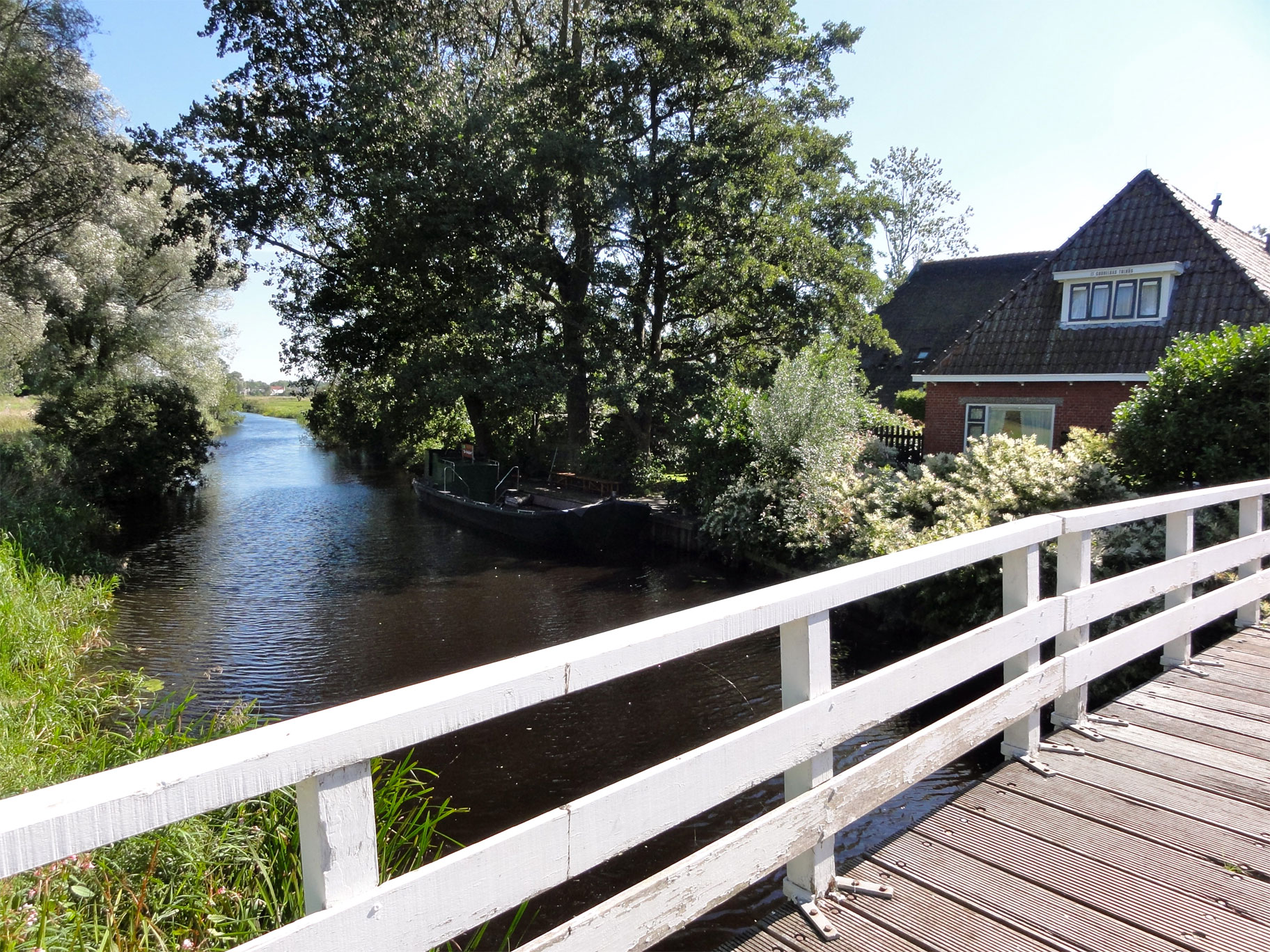
- Falomster Feart

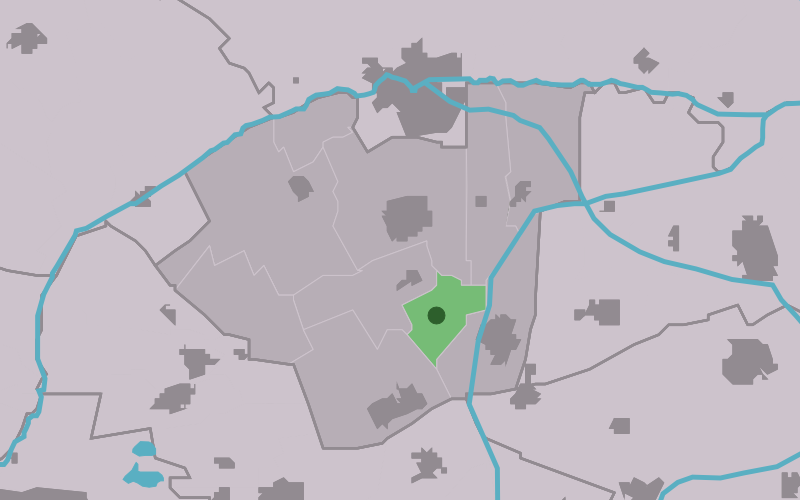
- Location in Dantumadiel municipality

- Location in the Netherlands De Falom (Netherlands)
- Country: Netherlands
- Province: Friesland
- Municipality: Dantumadiel

Population (2017)
  - Total: 235
- Time zone: UTC+1 (CET)
  - Summer (DST): UTC+2 (CEST)

De Falom (Dutch: De Valom) is a village in the Dantumadiel municipality of Friesland, the Netherlands. It had a population of 235 in 2017.

== History ==
The Falom originated along the Falomster Feart, which was dug in the 16th century. The canal was built for the exploitation of the peat area in which it was located. Along the canal, habitation gradually developed and so a hamlet developed. In 1664 the hamlet was mentioned as Vall-om, in 1718 as De Vallom and in 1786 as de Valom. The place name could probably refer to a dilapidated house or building.

De Tegenwoordige Staat van Friesland described the hamlet at the end of the 18th century as a neighborhood with more than 20 houses. It reports that in the past a lot of peat was dug here. But by then this industry has been completely disappeared for many years, and has made way for buckwheat and rye. Up until 1974 it was hamlet with northern part falling under the village of Murmerwoude and the southern part under the then called Zwaagwesteinde (De Westereen). In 1974 it became an official village under the Dutch name De Valom.

In 2008 the municipality Dantumadiel decided that it was going the replace all the official Dutch names within the municipality with the West Frisian names, meaning that De Falom was from 2009 the official name.
