= Feanwâldsterwâl =

Feanwâldsterwâl Veenwoudsterwal
- Village
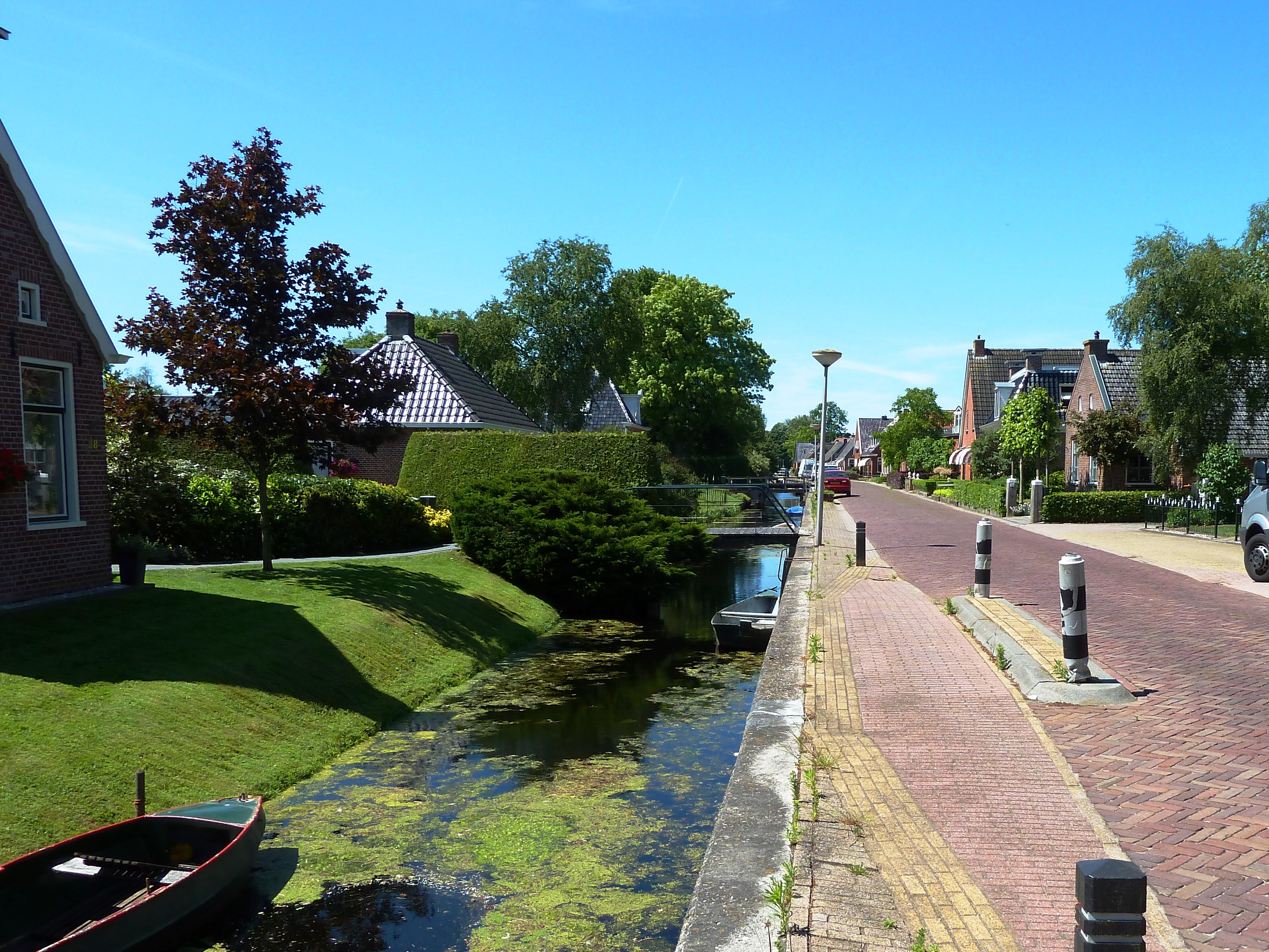
- The main street De Wâl

- Location in the Netherlands Feanwâldsterwâl (Netherlands)
- Country: Netherlands
- Province: Friesland
- Municipality: Dantumadiel
- Municipality: Tytsjerksteradiel

Population (2021)
  - Total: c. 420
- Time zone: UTC+1 (CET)
  - Summer (DST): UTC+2 (CEST)

Feanwâldsterwâl (Dutch: Veenwoudsterwal) is a village in the Dantumadiel and Tytsjerksteradiel municipalities of Friesland, Netherlands. It had a population of around 420 in 2021; however, Feanwâldsterwâl is not a statistical entity, and the population count is only an estimate.

Together with the village of Feanwâlden, it has a village interest association group under the name Vereniging van Dorpsbelangen Veenwouden / Veenwoudsterwal e.o.

== History ==
The village Feanwâldsterwâl originated as a peat colony of Feanwâlden. It was possibly founded by Gieterse Mennonites from Feanwâlden, alongside the water that has long formed the boundary between the municipalities and former Grietenijen Dantumadiel and Tytsjerksteradiel. The place was mentioned in 1664 as Diepswal. This was the original place name and most of the occupancy at the time was on the waterside of Dantumadiel.

In the 19th century it was given the name Veenwoudsterwal, specifically indicated in 1841. On a map of 1847 one speaks of Diepswal on the waterside of Dantumadiel and Veenwoudsterwal on the side of Tytsjerksteradiel. Later the village is also referred to as Diepswal or Veenwoudsterwal. In 1958 the name De Wal emerged. Locally it is still called De Wâl in West Frisian. The main street is also called De Wâl.

Until 2009 the official name was Veenwoudsterwal. In 2008 the municipality Dantumadiel decided that it was going the replace all the official Dutch names within the municipality with the West Frisian names. The municipality Tytsjerksteradiel followed the official name change for the village of Veenwoudsterwal meaning that Feanwâldsterwâl was from 2009 the official name for the village.

The place was for a time seen as a hamlet of Feanwâlden but eventually got independent village status. According to the municipality of Dantumadiel, it had lost its formal village status in 1923. This was partly the reason why it did not receive its own postal code in 1978, in addition to the fact that it was divided between two municipalities. It took until 2011 that the municipality of Dantumadiel gave it official village status again after a substantial lobby from the village. In terms of postal code it is still divided among Feanwâlden, Hurdegaryp and Noardburgum.

== Notable people ==
- Jeltje van der Werf
