= Sibrandahûs =

Sibrandahûs Sijbrandahuis
- Village
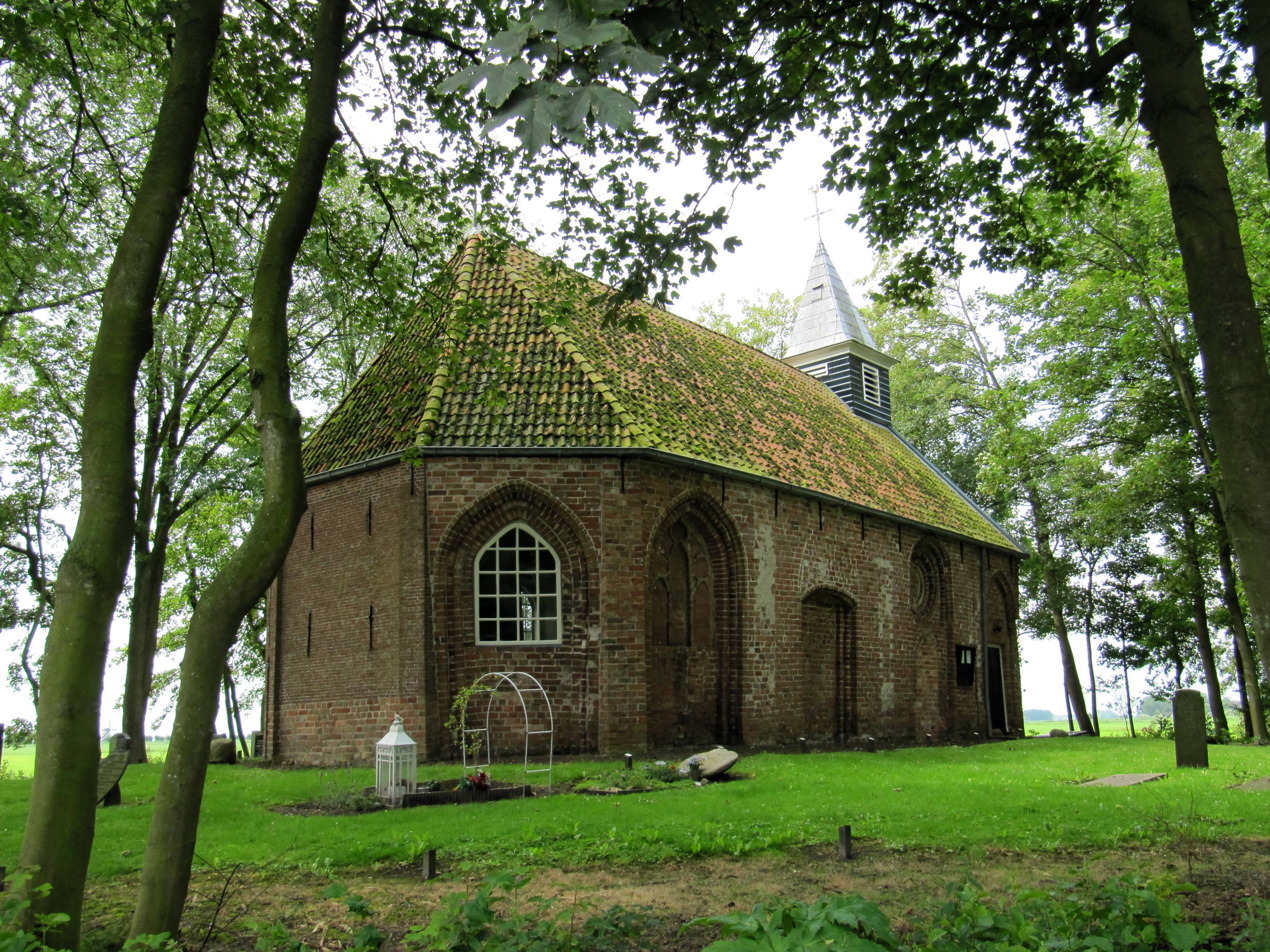
- Monastery chapel of Sibrandahûs

- Coat of arms

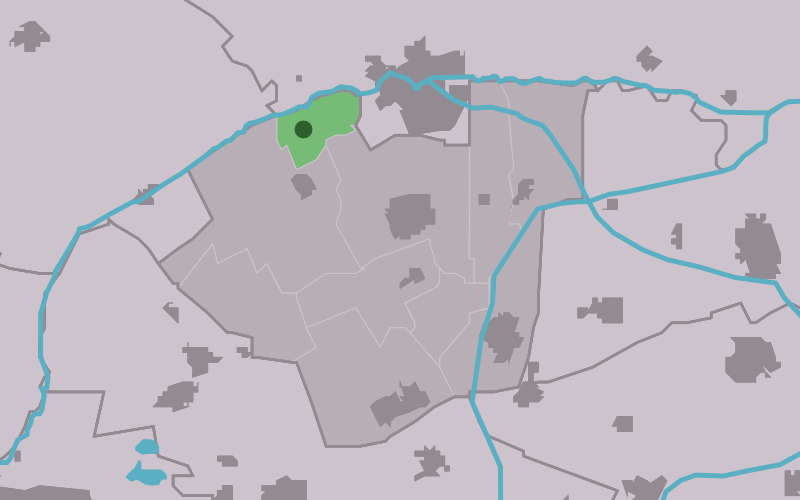
- Location in Dantumadiel municipality

- Location in the Netherlands Sibrandahûs (Netherlands)
- Country: Netherlands
- Province: Friesland
- Municipality: Dantumadiel

Population (2017)
  - Total: 40
- Time zone: UTC+1 (CET)
  - Summer (DST): UTC+2 (CEST)

Sibrandahûs (Dutch: Sijbrandahuis) is a small village in the Dantumadiel municipality of Friesland, the Netherlands. It had a population of around 40 in 2017. It is located just west of Dokkum.

Sibrandahûs has no real residential core, the village consists of wide meadows with light habitation and a church placed in a tree seam. The village could also be called a hamlet, but because it has a church and it is the official residential center it is considered a village.

On the corner of the Trekwei and the Burdaarderstrjitwei stands the windmill called Windmotor Sijbrandahuis.

== History ==
The village originates from on an artificial dwelling mound, a so-called terp. The church of the light inhabited terp was built around 1300 nearby on very low laying land. This was possible in that period because Friesland had become more diked. It was long thought that the church without a tower was a chapel range of a monastery Klaarkamp. This abbey monastery was located west of Sibrandahûs and the Klaaskampster Lake was also nearby. The lake was later reclaimed.

However, it is more likely that the church was built by order of the inhabitants of the terp. At the time there was a fortified house on the mound, called Sterkenburg of the Tjaarda family, a prominent family from Rinsumageast. The important branch Tjarda van Starkenborgh was later created from that family through a marriage. The fortified house was demolished in the 19th century and replaced by a farm. This stelp farm dates from 1868 and bears the name 'Starkenborgh'.

The village itself is first mentioned in 1491 as Sibrandahuys. In 1511 it is mentioned as Sybrandahuys, in 1543 as Sybrandahuysum, in 1573 as Sybrandehuysum and in 1786 as Sibrandahuis and Sibrenhuws.

In the 19th century it is cited that the Old Frisian variant was Sibrenhuws. In modern West Frisian it is Sibrandahûs. The Dutch name Sijbrandahuis was the official name until 2009. That spelling was used as the standard name from the 19th century, with the variant sometimes Sibrandahuis. In 2008 the municipality Dantumadiel decided that it was going the replace all the official Dutch names within the municipality with the West Frisian names, meaning that Sibrandahûs was from 2009 the official name for the village.
