= De Broekmolen, Broeksterwâld =

Smock mill in the Netherlands

De Broekmolen
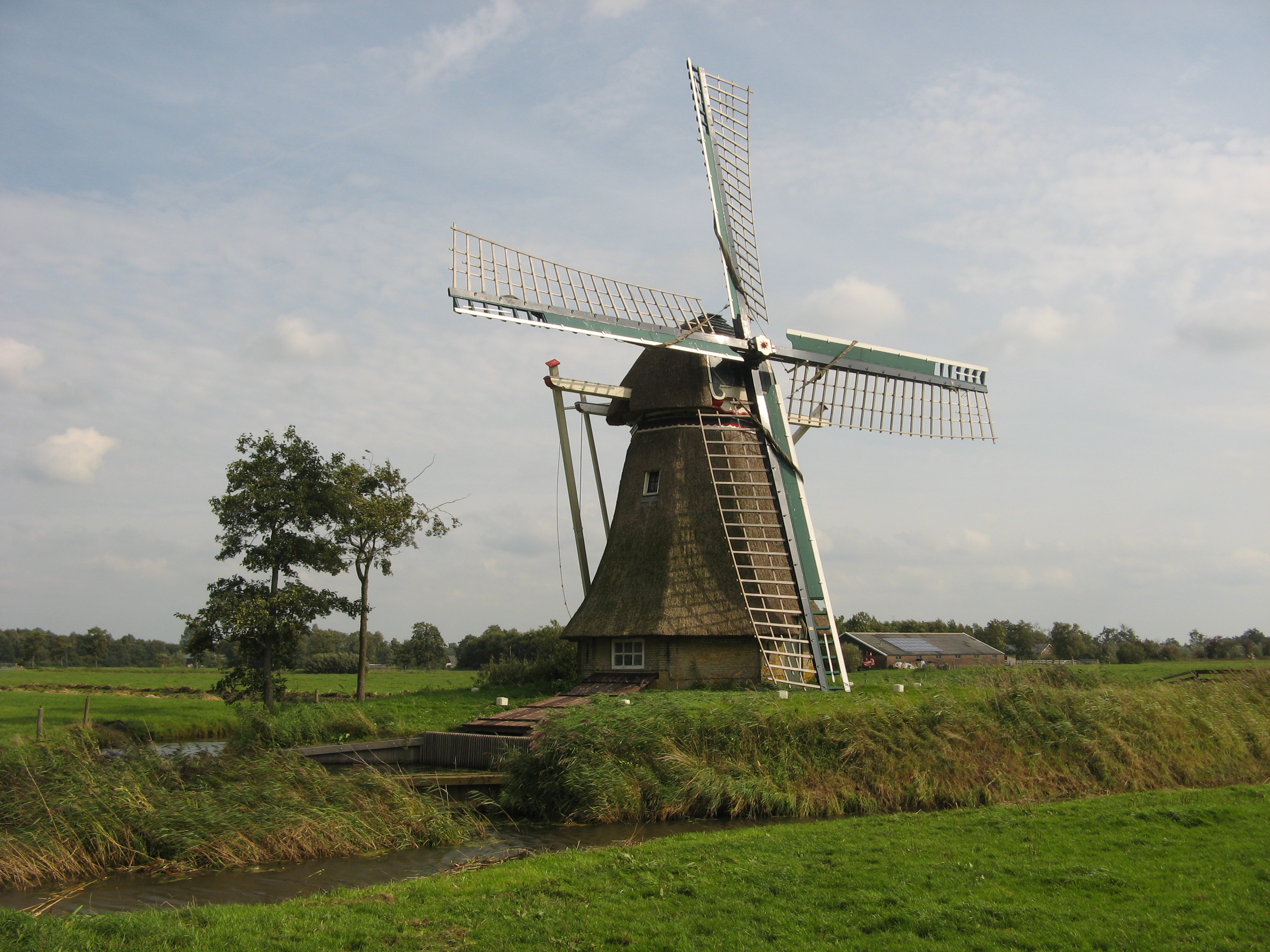
- De Broekmolen, September 2010

Origin
- Mill name: De Broekmolen
- Mill location: Near Schwartzenbergerloane 2, 9108 AL Broeksterwâld
- Coordinates: 53°16′01″N 5°58′15″E
- Operator(s): Stichting De Fryske Mole
- Year built: 1876

Information
- Purpose: Drainage mill
- Type: Smock mill
- Storeys: Three-storey smock
- Base storeys: Single-storey base
- Smock sides: Eight sides
- No. of sails: Four sails
- Type of sails: Common sails
- Windshaft: Cast iron
- Winding: Tailpole and winch
- Auxiliary power: Diesel engine
- Type of pump: Archimedes' screw

De Broekmolen is a smock mill in Broeksterwâld, Friesland, Netherlands which has been restored to working order. The mill is listed as a Rijksmonument, number 11678.

== History ==
De Broekmolen was built in 1876 by millwrights Wietse Jurjen en Comp. In 1911, Patent sails were fitted. This work was done by millwright Meindert van der Meulen of Dokkum. A new windshaft was fitted in 1915 at a cost of ƒ600. A new pair of sails were fitted in 1923 at a cost of ƒ565. The sails were fitted with Dekker streamlined leading edges in 1937 by millwright Westra of Franeker. A diesel engine was installed as auxiliary power in 1961 and the Archimedes' screw was renewed. The mill ceased working a few years later. The mill was restored in 1975. Common sails were fitted as part of the restoration. The mill was sold to Stichting De Fryske Mole (English: Frisian Mills Foundation) in 1977. New sails were fitted in 2008.

== Description ==
De Broekmolen is a smock mill winded by a winch. There is no stage, the sails reaching almost to the ground. The mill has a single-storey brick base and a three-storey smock. The smock and cap are thatched. The four Common sails have a span of 16.70 metres (54 ft 9 in) and are carried in a cast-iron windshaft. The windshaft also carries the brake wheel which has 44 cogs. This drives the wallower (23 cogs) at the top of the upright shaft. At the bottom of the upright shaft, the crown wheel (34 cogs) drives the steel Archimedes' screw via a gear wheel with 32 cogs. The Archimedes' screw has an axle diameter of 460 millimetres (1 ft 6 in) and is 1.32 metres (4 ft 4 in) diameter overall. It is inclined at an angle of 23°. Each revolution of the screw lifts 439 litres (97 imp gal) of water.

== Public access ==
De Broekmolen is open to the public by appointment.
