= Skierstins =

Schierstins
- Schierstins (Dutch)
- Feanwâlden, the Netherlands
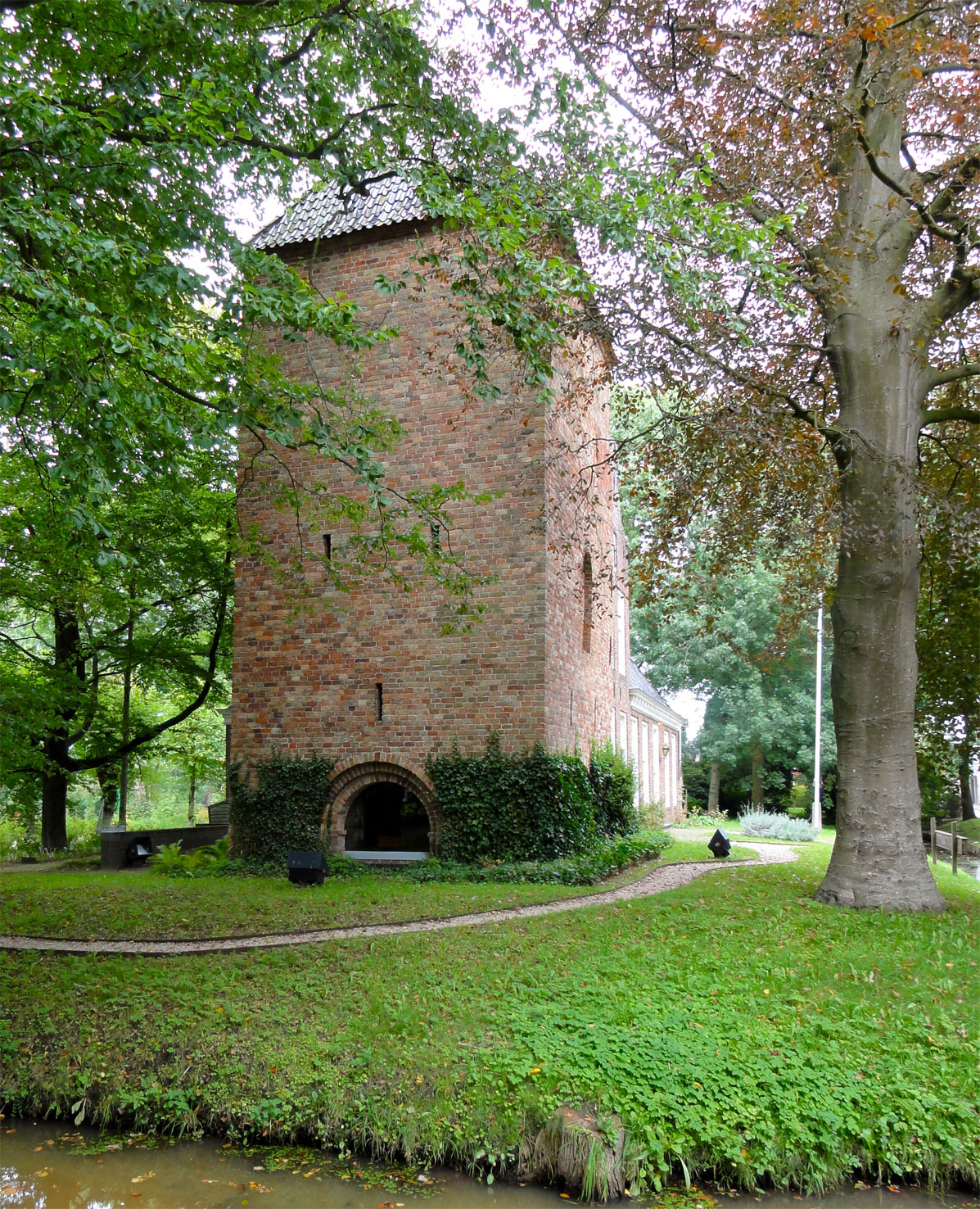
- Schierstins

Site information
- Type: Castle
- Open to the public: Yes
- Condition: Good

Location
- The Netherlands
- Coordinates: 53°14′22″N 5°59′26″E

Site history
- Built: c. 1300
- Materials: Brick

The Skierstins (Dutch: Schierstins) is a medieval Stienhús built c. 1300 out of brick in Feanwâlden. It is the only remaining medieval Stienhús in Friesland. It is listed as Rijksmonument number 11700 and rated with a very high historical value. The building is first mentioned in 1439 on a piece of parchment.

== See also ==
- List of castles in the Netherlands
