= Grutte Mûne, Broeksterwâld =

Windmill in Friesland

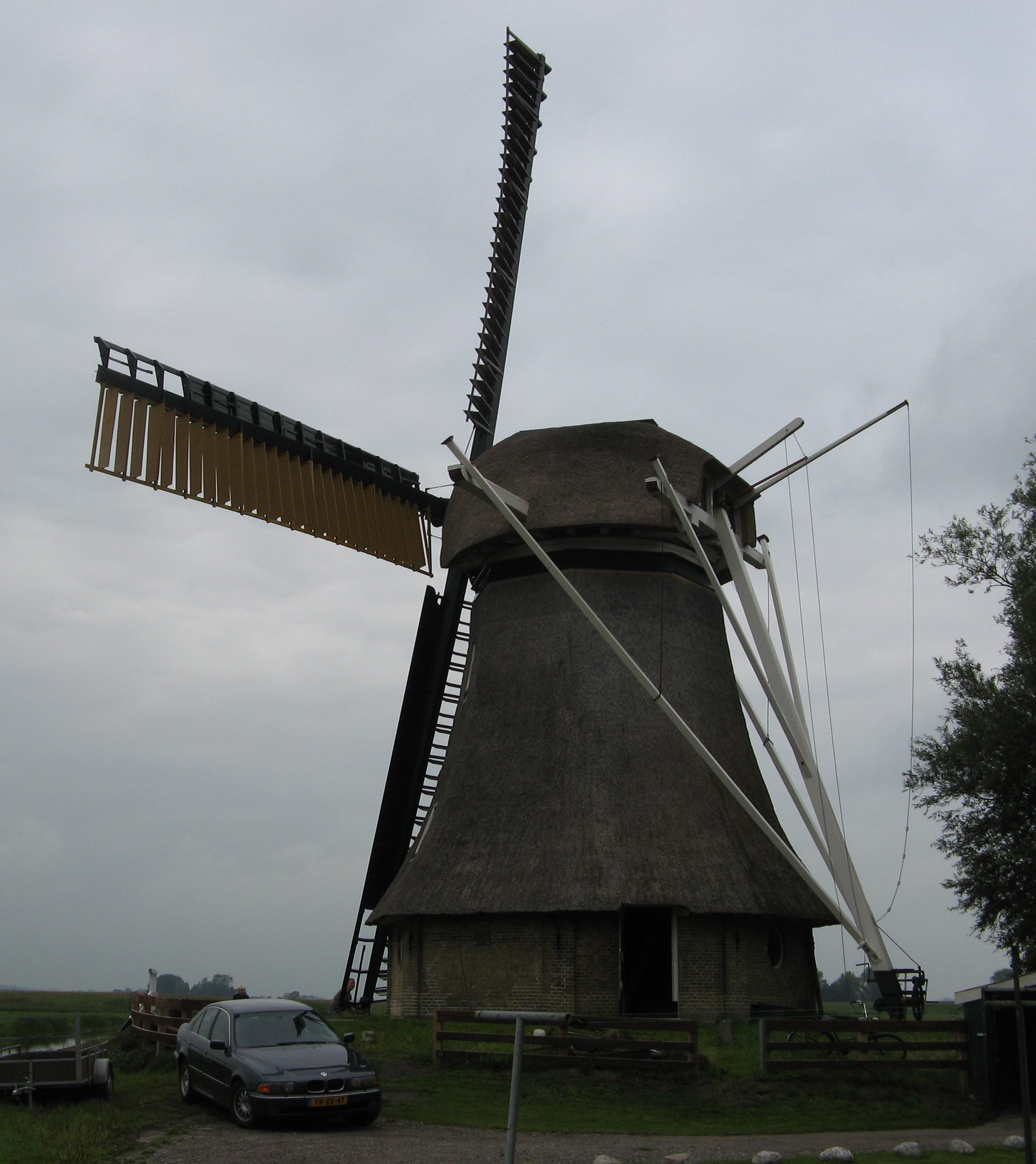

Origin
- Mill name: Grutte Mûne
- Mill location: Tienewei 11, 9104 AA Broeksterwâld
- Coordinates: 53°16′34″N 5°58′39″E
- Operator(s): Stichting De Fryske Mole
- Year built: 1887

Information
- Purpose: Drainage mill
- Type: Smock mill
- Storeys: Two-storey smock
- Base storeys: Single-storey base
- Smock sides: Eight sides
- No. of sails: Four sails
- Type of sails: Patent sails
- Windshaft: Cast iron
- Winding: Tailpole and winch
- Auxiliary power: Steam engine
- Type of pump: Archimedes' screw

The Grutte Mûne (English: Great Mill, Dutch: De Grote Molen) is a smock mill in Broeksterwâld, Friesland, Netherlands which has been restored to working order. The mill is listed as a Rijksmonument, number 11679.

== History ==
In 1880 a windmill was built on this site by millwright Oege Plantinga of Wânswert. This mill was burnt down in 1887. The Grutte Mûne was built to replace it by millwright Gerben van Wieren of Jannum. It was originally built with two Archimedes' screws. The mill was at one time equipped with Patent sails. In 1934, one of the Archimedes' screws was transferred to the Lytse Mûne. The spurwheel needed to drive the second screw was removed around 1986 and later reused in gristmill De Vlijt. A centrifugal pump was installed in 1943 and the mill ceased to work. The mill was restored in 1959 and again in 1975, at which time the patent system sails were replaced by commons sails. In 1977 it was sold to Stichting De Fryske Mole (English: Frisian Mills Foundation). A further restoration was undertaken in 1994. In 2010 and 2011 major restoration work was done. Amongst others it was decided to repair the riveted stocks dating from 1902 instead of replacing them with new welded steel stocks and to refit the patent system which had been removed in 1975.

== Description ==
The Grutte Mûne is what the Dutch describe as an "achtkante grondzeiler". It is a smock mill winded by a winch. There is no stage, the sails reaching almost to the ground. The mill has a single-storey brick base and a two-storey smock. The smock and cap are thatched. The four Patent sails have a span of 22.54 metres (73 ft 11 in) and are carried in a cast-iron windshaft, which was cast by Prins van Oranje, The Hague in 1879. The windshaft also carries the clasp arm brake wheel, which has 66 cogs. This drives the wallower (35 cogs) at the top of the upright shaft. At the bottom of the upright shaft, the crown wheel (48 cogs) drives the wooden Archimedes' screw via a gear wheel with 42 cogs. The Archimedes' screw has an axle diameter of 438 millimetres (1 ft 5 in) and is 1.50 metres (4 ft 11 in) diameter overall. It is inclined at an angle of 15°. Each revolution of the screw lifts 543 litres (119 imp gal) of water.
