= Broeksterwâld =

Broeksterwâld Broeksterwoude
- Village
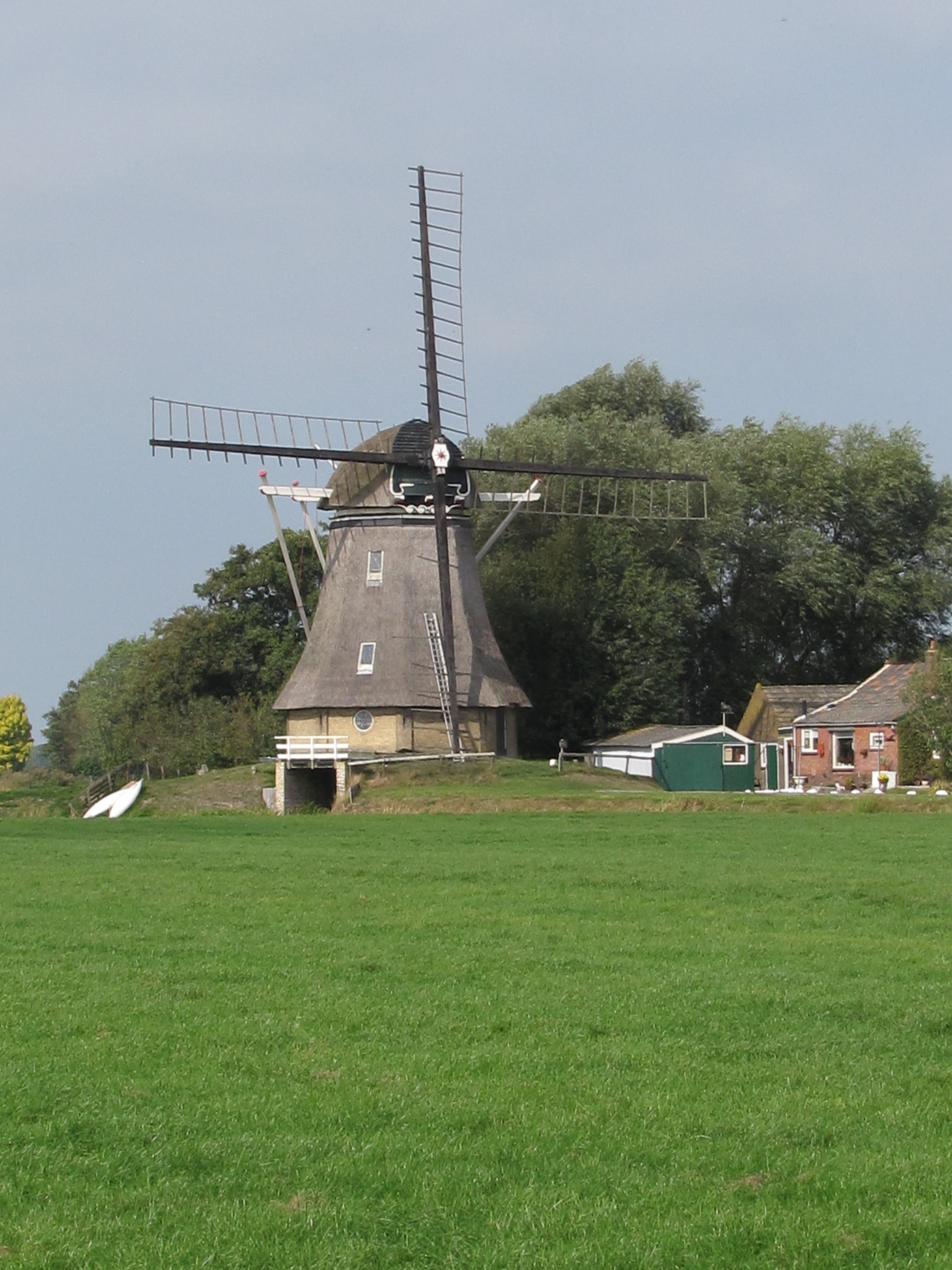
- The Grutte Mûne (Great Mill)

- Coat of arms

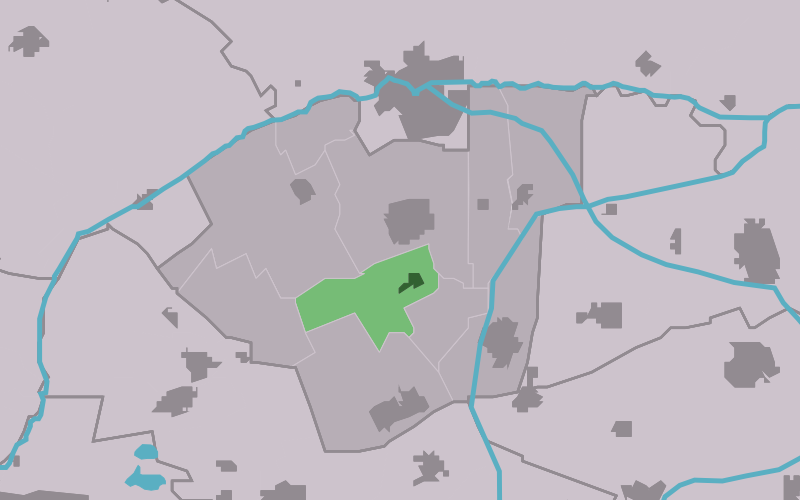
- Location in Dantumadiel municipality

- Location in the Netherlands Broeksterwâld (Netherlands)
- Country: Netherlands
- Province: Friesland
- Municipality: Dantumadiel

Population (2017)
  - Total: 1,100
- Time zone: UTC+1 (CET)
  - Summer (DST): UTC+2 (CEST)

Broeksterwâld (Dutch: Broeksterwoude) is a village in the Dantumadiel municipality of Friesland, in the Netherlands. In 2017, it had a population of around 1,100.

== History ==
The area in which Broeksterwâld arose was mentioned in 1452/3 as Broe(c)k and in 1580 as Broeick. It was a swampy peatland near the edge of the Dokkumer Wouden, Dokkumer woods. It was then a mainly uninhabited and uncultivated area around the villages Akkerwoude, Murmerwoude and Dantumawoude. The first mention of the peatland refers to the making (and the maintenance) of a road through the peatland from Broek to the Swatte. Probably for the first reclamation of the peatland. The road later became the Schwartzenberglaan, Singel and de Goddeloze Singel.

In 1718 the peatland is mentioned as De Broek. In the area the already have some habitation and a small hamlet with the name Broeksterhuyzen. This hamlet was also mentioned in 1847, as Broeksterhuizen, next to the later hamlet that arose in the same area. The later village originated from the other hamlet. That hamlet was mentioned in 1847 as De Broek. In 1877 the other hamlet, which was located southeast of Dantumawoude, was once again mentioned as Broeksterhuizen, but has since disappeared as a place name. In 1857, the hamlet De Broek consisted mainly of loose habitation south of Murmerwoude.

However, the area in which the hamlet was located was counted under Akkerwoude. Falling under that place while it was developing more and more as a real place of its own. In the early twentieth century, the settlers' turf huts were replaced by small farms and houses built of stone. Further development of the habitation followed thereafter.

In 1964 it had grown so much that it was decided to give the place its independence as a real village. The name of the village became Broeksterwoude. Before that it was known as De Broek, Broek or sometimes also the Broekpollen. The old peatland is known as the Broekpolder. In 2008 the municipality Dantumadiel decided that it was going the replace all the official Dutch names within the municipality with the West Frisian names, meaning that Broeksterwâld was from 2009 the official name for the village.
