= Feankleaster =

- Village
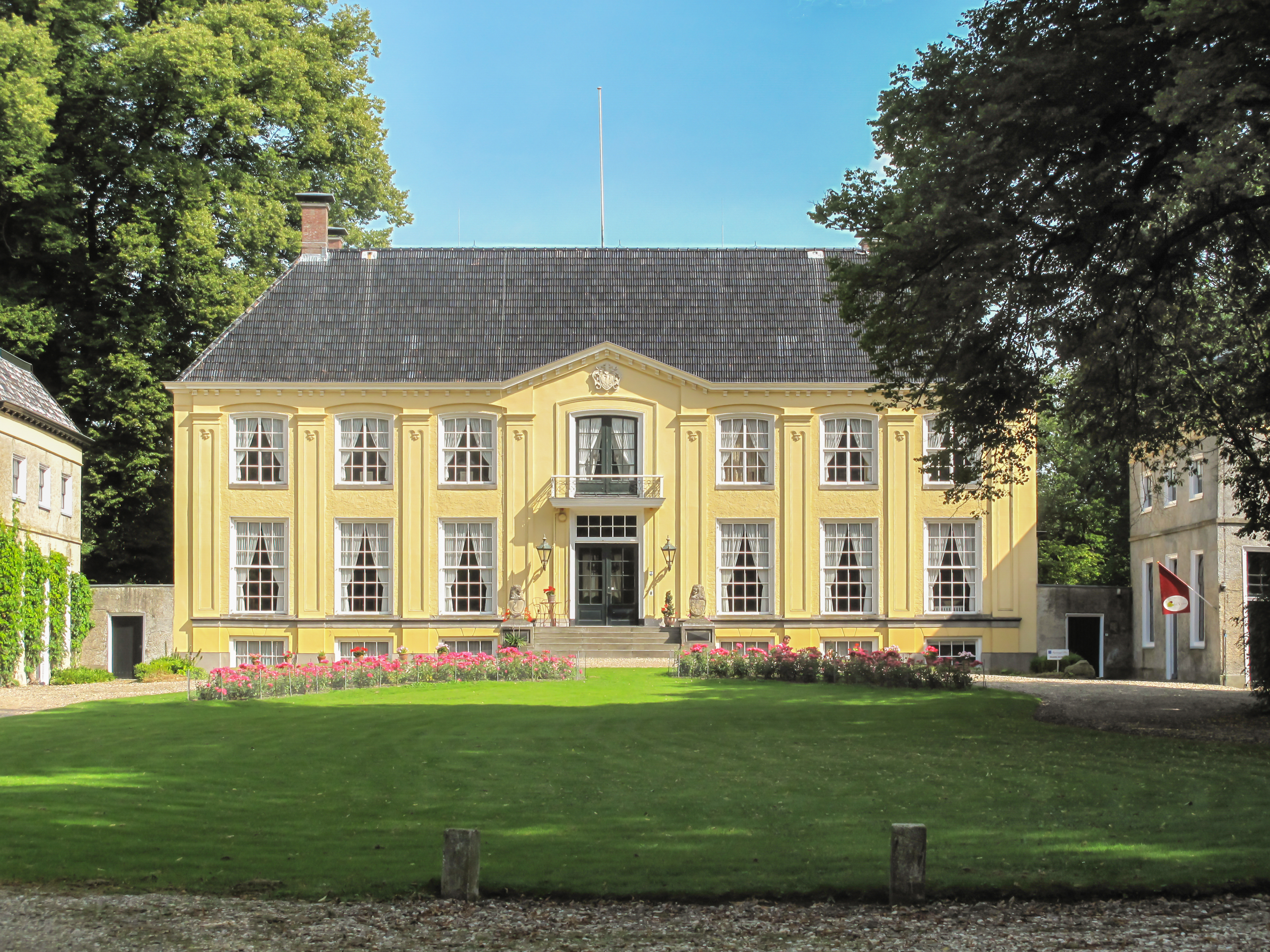
- Feankleaster, country house: de Fogelsangh State

- Flag Coat of arms

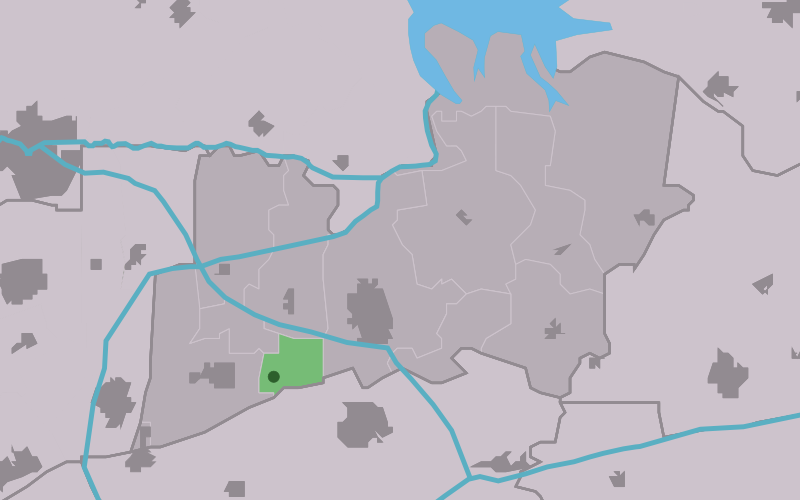
- Location in the former Kollumerland municipality

- Location in the Netherlands Feankleaster (Netherlands)
- Country: Netherlands
- Province: Friesland
- Municipality: Noardeast-Fryslân

Area
  - Total: 2.48 km^{2} (0.96 sq mi)
- Elevation: 1.5 m (4.9 ft)

Population (2021)
  - Total: 110
  - Density: 44/km^{2} (110/sq mi)
- Time zone: UTC+1 (CET)
  - Summer (DST): UTC+2 (CEST)
- Postal code: 9297
- Dialing code: 0511

Feankleaster is a small village in Noardeast-Fryslân municipality in the province of Friesland, the Netherlands, with a population of around 97 in January 2017. Before 2019, the village was part of the Kollumerland en Nieuwkruisland municipality.

== History ==
The village was first mentioned in 1446 as "da conuent to Faen", and means monastery on the moorland. Feankleaster started as a peat excavation settlement in the 11th or 12th century and developed along the intersection of the road from Kollum to Kollumersweach and Twijzel.

Before 1287, the monastery Olijfberg was founded on the brink (communal pasture) in the village as an outpost of the Premonstratensian monastery of Aldwâld. Olijfberg was abandoned in 1579, and the estate Fogelsangh State was built in its place in 1646. The estate remains private property and is nowadays owned by Kyra Livia, Baroness van Harinxma thoe Slooten. The estate was restored between 1971 and 1972, and houses an annex of the Fries Museum.

In 1840, Feankleaster was home to 66 people. In 1870, the manor house It Lytse Slot was built in Feankleaster by the van Heemstra family. Feankleaster contains many old oak trees.

The village's official name was changed from Veenklooster to Feankleaster in 2023.

== Marianne Vaatstra murder ==
The village made national headlines after the murder of Marianne Vaatstra and subsequent riots which took place in the area in 1999. The case was only solved 13 years after the murder when the perpetrator was arrested after a DNA match.

== Gallery ==
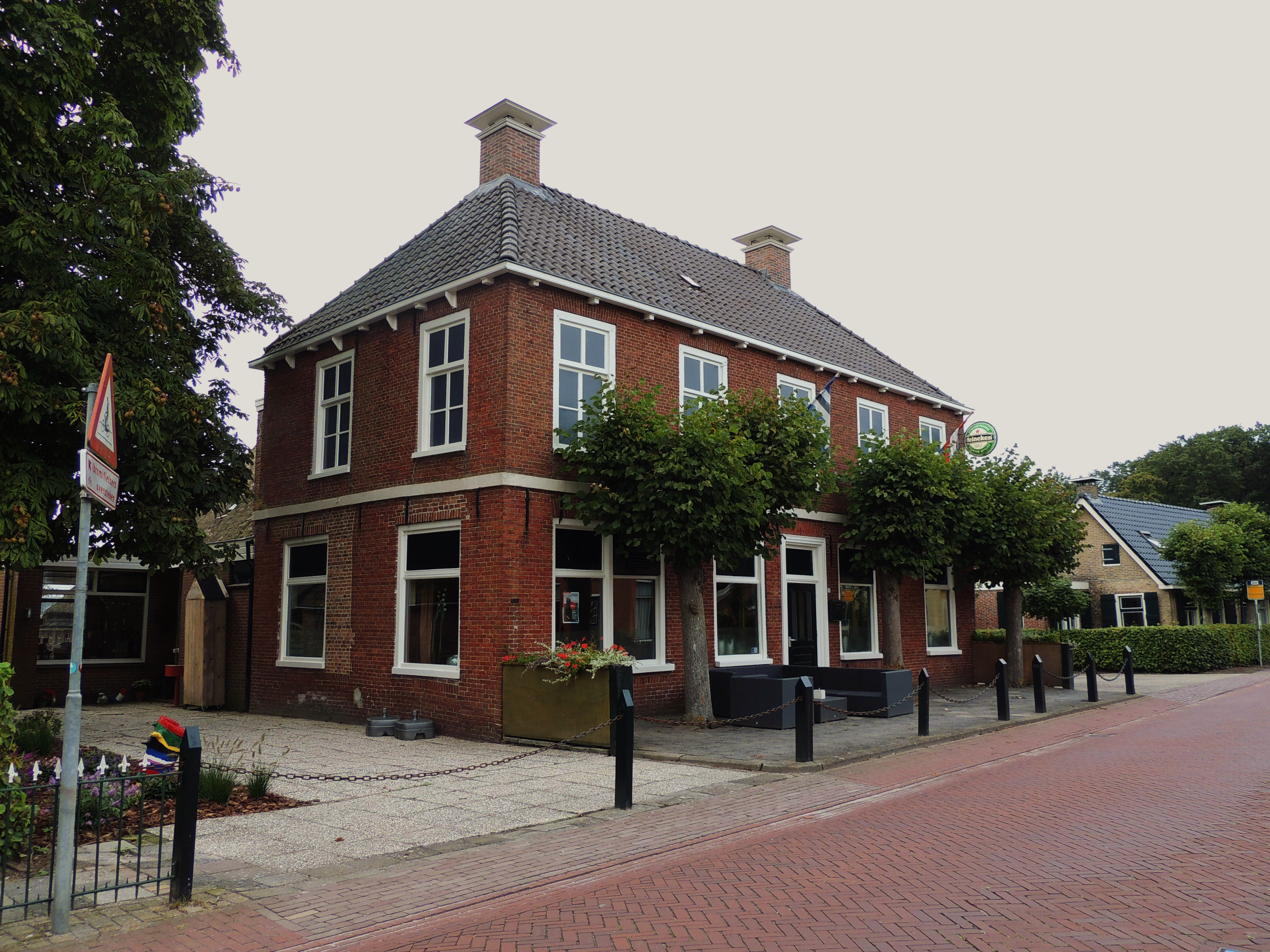
Pub De Swean

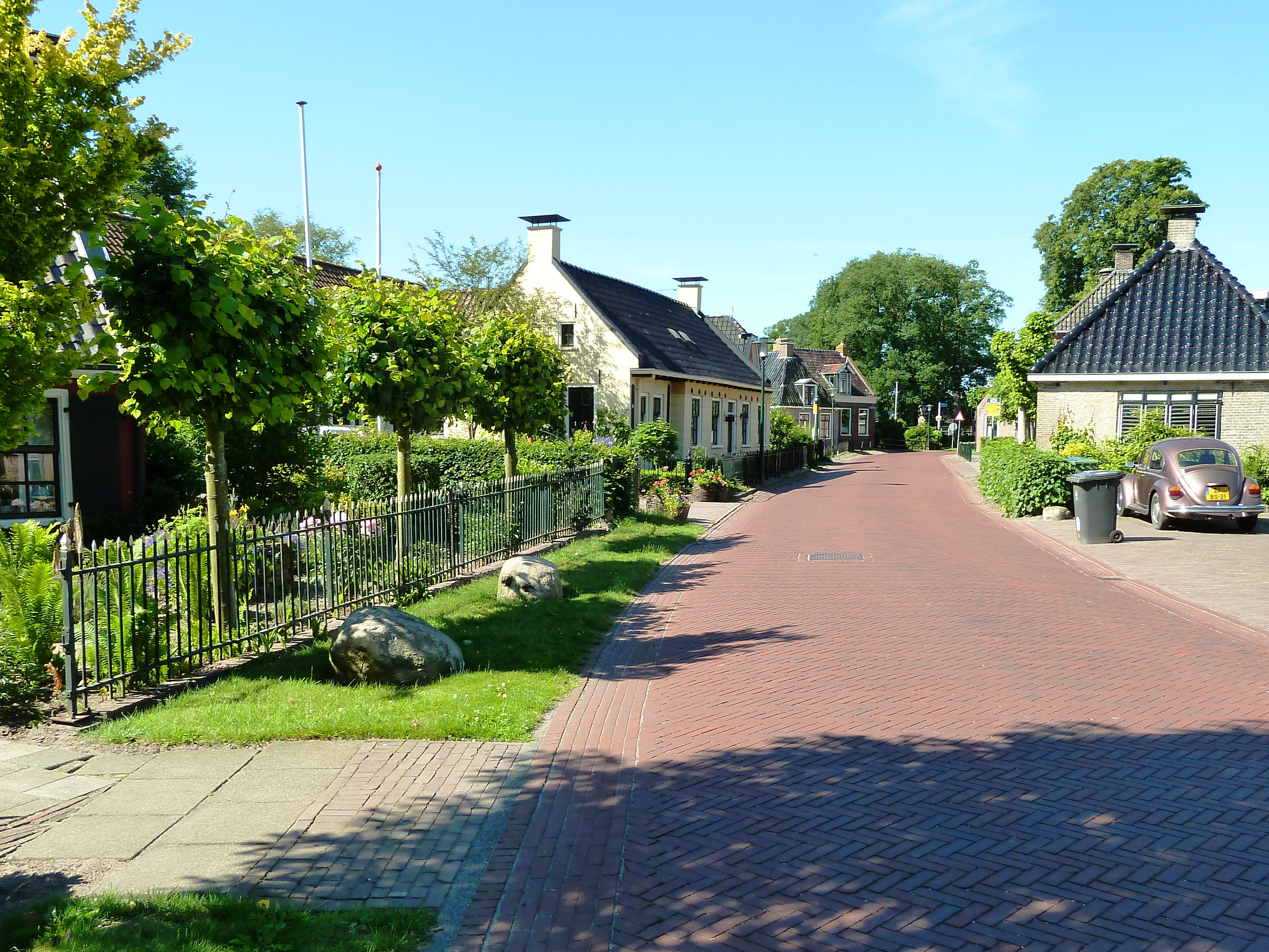
Street view

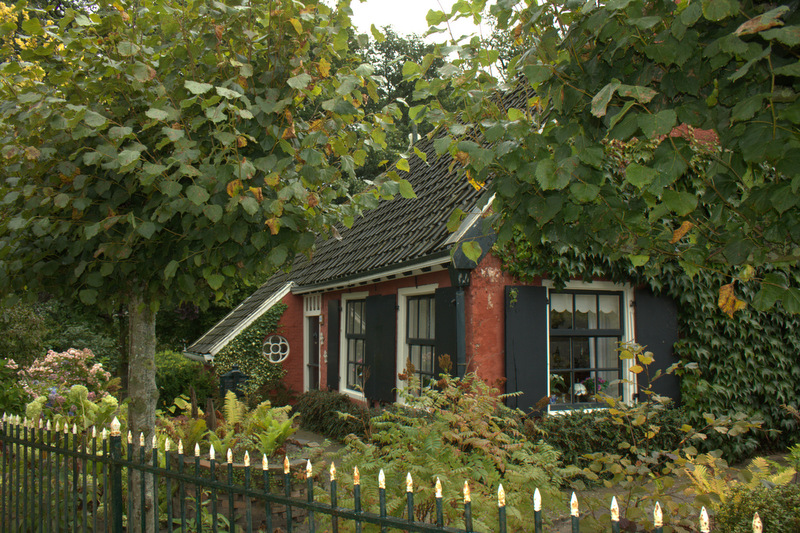
House hidden in the green

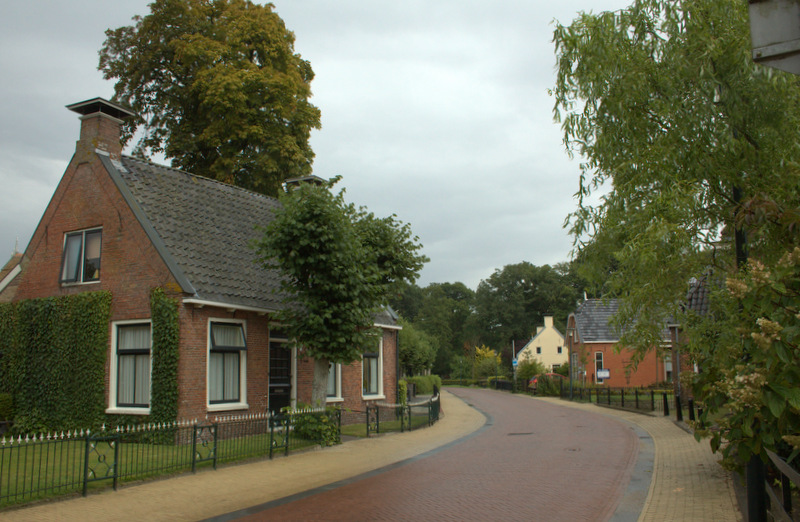
Street view
