= Killing of Nicole van den Hurk =

1995 murder case in North Brabant, Netherlands

- Nicole van den Hurk
- Date: c. 6 October 1995 (body discovered 22 November 1995)
- Location: Eindhoven, North Brabant, Netherlands; 51°25′37.7″N 5°40′1.63″E
- Type: Homicide
- Perpetrator: Jos de Graaf
- Suspects: Andy van den Hurk (1996, 2011); Ad van den Hurk (1996); Jos de Graaf (2014–2016)
- Convicted: Jos de Graaf
- Charges: Trial: Rape, manslaughter Appeal: Manslaughter
- Trial: Trial: 2 November 2015 – 21 November 2016; Appeal: 28 August – 9 October 2018
- Verdict: Trial: Guilty (rape); Not guilty (manslaughter); Appeal: Guilty (rape and manslaughter)
- Sentence: Trial: 5 years' imprisonment Appeal: 12 years' imprisonment

Fifteen-year-old Nicole van den Hurk (Dutch pronunciation: [niˈkɔl vɑn də(n) ˈɦʏr(ə)k; - dɛn -]) disappeared on 6 October 1995 in Eindhoven (the Dutch province of North Brabant), the Netherlands. Her body was found in the woods between Mierlo and Lierop on 22 November.

Van den Hurk's stepbrother confessed to the killing and was arrested in 2011, but released five days later due to a lack of evidence. He later claimed to have falsely confessed so that her body would be exhumed for DNA tests.

In January 2014, DNA collected from van den Hurk's remains and the crime scene led to the arrest of a man who had been convicted in other cases with the same modus operandi. The man, known as Jos de G. (Dutch pronunciation: [ˈjɔz də ˈɣeː]) (born 1967), was charged with rape and manslaughter. The trial began in 2015 and hinged on expert testimony from DNA analysts.

In November 2016, de Graaf was convicted of rape but acquitted of manslaughter and sentenced to five years' imprisonment. The prosecution appealed the acquittal, and in 2018 de Graaf was convicted of both rape and manslaughter, increasing his sentence to twelve years.

== Background and disappearance ==
Nicole was born on 4 July 1980 in Erkelenz, Germany as Nicole Tegtmeier. Her mother, Angelika Tegtmeier, soon entered into a relationship with Ad van den Hurk. The three moved to the Netherlands where Angelika married Ad, and Nicole assumed his surname.

In 1989, Ad and Angelika divorced, and Ad won custody of Nicole. In April 1995, Angelika took her own life in Tilburg. Nicole was living with her grandmother in Tongelre at the time.

Location where Nicole van den Hurk's remains were found.

In October 1995, fifteen-year-old Nicole van den Hurk had been working a seasonal holiday position in Woensel shopping centre. She began cycling to work in the early hours of Friday, 6 October but never arrived for her shift. At 18:00 that day, police found her bicycle in the river Dommel, and on 19 October her rucksack was found near Eindhoven canal. Police began a search of the canal and its south bank the following day. By 20 November, police had received hundreds of tips.

On Wednesday, 22 November, a passerby found van den Hurk's body in the woods between Mierlo and Lierop. Approximately one thousand people attended her funeral on 28 November. Her autopsy revealed a fatal stab wound to the ribs, two jaw fractures, and other injuries to the head and fingers.

== Investigation ==
On 24 October 1995, an anonymous man called police claiming he could identify the killer, but the call ended prematurely. A recording of the call was broadcast on national television in January 1996 in an attempt to find the caller. Later, the team of detectives was reduced to four.

In February, a friend of the van den Hurk family, while under arrest for drug trafficking, claimed to have been forced to smuggle heroin by men involved in the killing. The police said his testimony was flawed and provided nothing meaningful to the investigation.

Passie magazine offered a reward for details about the killer. Between May and June, van den Hurk's stepbrother and stepfather were arrested in connection with the killing, but later cleared.

=== Stepbrother's confession ===
In 2004, a cold case team investigated the killing to no avail. By 2011, van den Hurk's stepbrother Andy had moved to England. On 8 March he confessed to the killing in a Facebook post and was arrested by British police. He was extradited to the Netherlands on 30 March but released five days later as the Facebook post was the only evidence against him. He later retracted his confession, instead accusing his father. In a 2016 interview, he claimed to have falsely confessed to the killing so that his stepsister's body would be exhumed for DNA testing.

In early 2011, after this confession, a new cold case team was assigned to investigate. Van den Hurk's remains were exhumed in September to collect new DNA samples. The reward for details about the killing was increased from ƒ25,000 (€11345) to €15,000. Within a week, the police announced that foreign DNA had been found on the remains and that they had received more than twenty new tips regarding the case.

=== Research ===
The prosecution's case was founded on test results from physical evidence and investigation of persons of interest. The evidence in the case comprised:

- General forensic, forensic pathological and forensic entomological research of the victim's remains and clothing
- DNA research of biological samples obtained from the victim's remains and clothing
- Forensic identification of the hair found on the victim's jacket
- Tactical investigation of all suspects
- Background analysis of the victim

=== Suspect identification ===
The DNA evidence from the remains revealed two distinct male profiles: one belonged to van den Hurk's boyfriend, and the other to an unidentified male. The cold case team connected the case to a similar one in September 2000 where a young woman in Valkenswaard was taken from her bicycle and raped at knifepoint; the perpetrator of that case was convicted in 2001. The similarities between the cases led the detectives to compare a DNA sample from that case to the DNA profiles obtained from van den Hurk's remains.

On 14 January 2014, the police arrested a 46-year-old man whose DNA matched samples found on the remains and at the crime scene. The semen DNA profile and the mtDNA profile of the hair found on the victim's jacket both matched with the suspect. The suspect Jos de Graaf—known by the pseudonym Jos de G. due to a privacy code commonly accepted by Dutch media—was previously convicted of three rapes and had been sentenced to three years preventive detention and compulsory treatment for one of them. It was known that he had left his ex-girlfriend's home after a fight a few hours before van den Hurk's disappearance.

== DNA analysis ==
The DNA sample obtained from van den Hurk's remains was the prosecution's main piece of evidence in the 2015 trial. It was also used by the defence as evidence against the manslaughter charges due to uncertainty surrounding the number of DNA profiles present in the samples.

=== Collection of DNA samples ===
In 1995, van den Hurk's body was outside for nearly 7 weeks before being found. Three DNA samples were collected from her remains: two on the genital area and one on her underwear. These DNA samples were considered to be at high risk of contamination due to decomposition caused by exposure to bacteria and natural elements, and primitive DNA collection techniques of the time.

=== Analysis by experts ===
Several DNA analysis experts from different forensic institutes were asked to research the complex mixed DNA samples for the 2014 trial, namely:

- R. Eikelenboom (Independent Forensic Services),
- J. Klaver-Koopman and T.J.P. de Blaeij (Netherlands Forensic Institute),
- J.S. Buckleton (Institute of Environmental Science and Research in New Zealand), and
- M.W. Perlin (chief scientific officer of U.S. company Cybergenetics)

These experts presented their conclusions during the trial and were examined about their findings.

The experts utilised various computer programs which analyse DNA profiles using statistical methods in a process called probabilistic genotyping. These programs included:

- TrueAllele, developed by Cybergenetics,
- LRmix Studio and MixCal, developed by the Netherlands Forensic Institute, and
- STRmix, developed by J.S. Buckleton and colleagues at the Institute of Environmental Science and Research.

=== Test results ===
The three DNA samples were analysed by the experts, but the results were inconclusive as the samples contained a complex mix of DNA profiles. The samples contained clear DNA profiles from two distinct males—believed by experts to be matches to de G. and van den Hurk's then-boyfriend—and some peaks that did not conclusively match either.

The issues with the DNA analysis led to speculation about another suspect that could exonerate de G. The DNA experts deliberated for years before coming to a conclusion, during which time wild speculations were made by the media, the defence team and the prosecution. The explanation from the experts about the inconclusive test results was misinterpreted by many as evidence for a "third DNA profile"; Nicole's stepfather and stepbrother were accused of being involved.

=== Trial conclusion and appeal ===
The DNA analysis concluded that the DNA samples contained two distinct DNA profiles and a set of peaks which were inconclusive. The court came to the conclusion that, beyond a reasonable doubt, the two distinctive profiles were from Jos de G. and van den Hurk's then-boyfriend. Two possible explanations for the presence of the peaks were presented:

1. Contamination and DNA degradation, or
2. One or more contributors to the samples other than de G., van den Hurk, or her boyfriend.

The uncertainty about the peaks would take years to be resolved, and would eventually be the basis for the prosecution's appeal.

During the appeal, the Dutch Supreme Court concluded that the second explanation was highly unlikely based on the evidence from the tactical investigations and forensic research of the case. Therefore, the possibility of other contributors to the DNA samples was eventually rejected by the Supreme Court on 21 April 2020.

== Trial ==
=== Court proceedings ===
When the case first went to court in April 2014, de G.'s lawyer disputed the DNA evidence since DNA from others, such as van den Hurk's ex-boyfriend, was also found on her remains. The defence argued that van den Hurk may have had consensual sex with multiple partners including de G., and that she could have been pregnant when she died.

In July 2014, the parquet (public prosecution) dropped the murder charge against de G. in favour of manslaughter and rape charges.

At a hearing in October 2015, de G. claimed to have never met van den Hurk and denied having contact with her at the time of her disappearance. When faced with evidence to the contrary, the defence argued that de G. may have had consensual sex with van den Hurk a few days before her disappearance and did not remember.

"He looked at me with those cold eyes and said he killed a girl", the first witness told the newspaper. De G. told the witness that he had sex with the girl and she laughed about the size of his penis. He killed her because she ridiculed him.

— NL Times, November 2015

De G.'s trial began on 2 November 2015. Prosecution experts testified to the DNA evidence. Later that month, the trial was suspended for two weeks during investigation into a witness's statement that de G. had confessed to killing a girl. In a later interview, that witness and another said that de G. had made this confession while they were patients in a mental institution a decade earlier. De G.'s counsel argued this testimony was motivated by the €15,000 reward.

A trace of semen containing DNA from at least two persons—believed by experts to be de G., van den Hurk's then-boyfriend and possibly a third suspect—had been found on her remains. With experts disagreeing on the reliability of the sample and the conclusions that could be drawn from the test results, it was announced in March 2016 that scientists would re-analyse the DNA results using new methods.

On 19 April 2016, the court heard that it was 2.28 million times more likely than not that de G. was one of the people whose DNA was found on the remains.

=== Verdict ===
On 12 October 2016, the prosecution demanded that de G. be sentenced to fourteen years' imprisonment, asserting that he could not have had consensual sex with van den Hurk as she had no time for a second relationship.

On 21 November 2016, de G. was found guilty of rape, but acquitted of manslaughter on the basis that there could be another suspect due to the inconclusive DNA analysis. The court sentenced him to five years' imprisonment. In determining the sentence, the court considered that he was deemed legally insane at the time of the crime.

=== Appeal and Supreme Court decision ===
The public prosecution appealed the manslaughter acquittal shortly after the trial ended. The appeal case began on 28 August 2018. On 29 August, the prosecution demanded a sentence of fourteen years' imprisonment as they had done in the initial trial. On 9 October, the acquittal was overturned and de G. was sentenced to twelve years' imprisonment for the rape and manslaughter of van den Hurk. The sentence was upheld by the Supreme Court on 16 June 2020.

== See also ==
- Cold case
- DNA profiling
- False confession
- Death of Nicky Verstappen
- Murder of Marianne Vaatstra
