= Murder of Marianne Vaatstra =

Dutch murder case

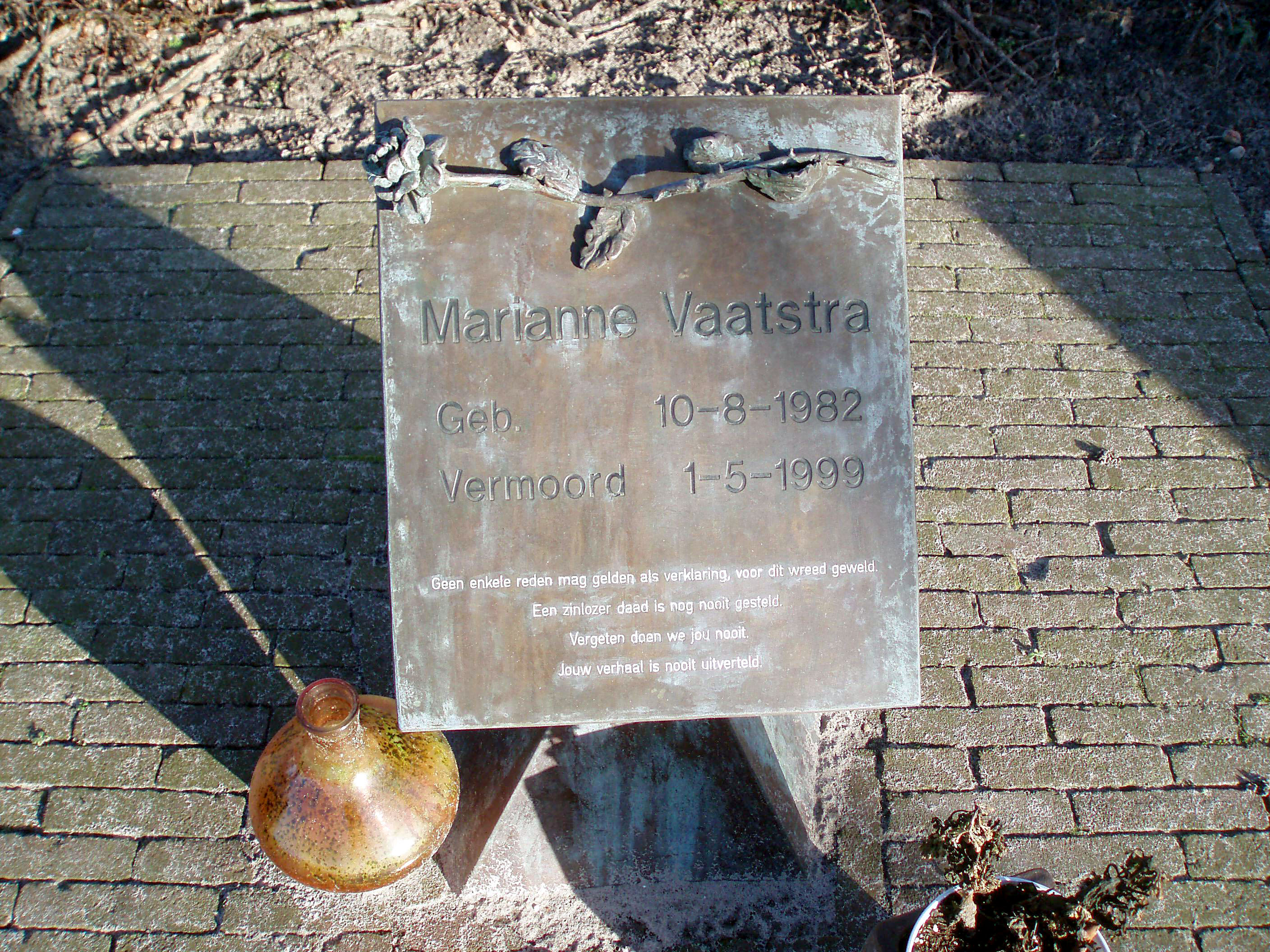
- Monument for Marianne Vaatstra
- Born: Marianne Vaatstra; 10 August 1982; De Westereen, Netherlands
- Died: 1 May 1999 (aged 16); Feankleaster, Netherlands
- Cause of death: Raped, then strangled and stabbed to death
- Arrested: Jasper Steringa (19 November 2012)
- Convicted: Jasper Steringa (19 April 2013)
- Perpetrator: Jasper Steringa

Marianne Vaatstra (Dutch pronunciation: [maːriˈjɑnə ˈvaːtstraː]; 10 August 1982 – 1 May 1999) was a Dutch girl whose rape and murder became a high-profile criminal case in the Netherlands. Vaatstra, then sixteen years old, was last seen alive cycling from Kollum to her parents' house in De Westereen (formerly Zwaagwesteinde). Her body was found the next day, in a field close to Feankleaster, her throat slit. Traces of the perpetrator's blood and semen were also found at the scene.

The blame was quickly pointed to inhabitants of the local asylum seekers' refuge, and a riot against asylum seekers ensued. The murder was a cold case until it was reopened in 2012 with large-scale DNA profiling in the area around the crime scene. This led to the arrest of a local farmer, Jasper Steringa, on 18 November of that year. He confessed to the rape and murder, and was sentenced to eighteen years' imprisonment. The case was one of the first in the country to be resolved mainly using DNA evidence and led to widespread debate about the use of DNA for criminal investigations.

== Initial investigation and riots ==
The population of Kollum was quick to blame inhabitants of the local asylum seekers' center for the murder. The center's security was upgraded, and riot police were readied in the weeks following the murder, to intervene in the case of fighting between locals and refugees. At a municipal information meeting in October 1999, about the opening of a new center in the town, locals rioted, with Kollumer youth egging the mayor. At least one woman, who had incited the riots, was convicted for a racist offence.

A first suspect, a 32-year-old man from De Westereen, was arrested in late May 1999, but was subsequently released because his DNA did not match that found at the crime scene. He would become the first in a series of twelve suspects who were similarly arrested and released.

From August 1999, police investigation of Vaatstra's murder focused on the asylum seekers' center near Kollum. The center's guards had reported that an Iraqi refugee had left the center on the night of the murder, and had been missing since. He was tracked down by Interpol and arrested in Istanbul in October, but the investigation became a national controversy after an official of the Public Prosecution Service had stated the arrest was made under political pressure. The Iraqi was found innocent of the murder by DNA evidence. In 2002, a final decision was made to open an asylum seekers' refuge at the planned location, without drawing local protests.

A DNA sweep was started in December 1999, initially targeting 170 men in the area, of whom 162 cooperated. No match was found. The following year, investigators published a psychological profile of the perpetrator, who they suspected to be a white, Western European male, living less than 15 km from the crime scene. Eventually, the case was closed, then reopened in 2002 for a year before being closed again.

== Investigation and suspect ==
The public prosecution service had arrested at least 12 suspects. DNA was collected from more than 900 people as part of a DNA investigation.

The murder got a lot of attention from the local press. A theme that was mentioned a lot was that they suspected that the murderer could be a civilian from the refugee camp nearby Kollum. Two asylum seekers from Iraq and Afghanistan became suspects, but based on the genetic fingerprints DNA-profiling they were no longer the suspects.

In May 2006, member of parliament Hilbrand Nawijn called to reinvestigate the police-analyses. In June 2007 and in June 2010, member of parliament Fred Teeven (VVD) asked questions about the case during a meeting. Also the television program Peter R. de Vries, misdaadverslaggever took a lot of time to investigate on this case.

On 29 September 2012, a DNA test was started in a 5 km radius of the crime scene, in which about 8000 males participated. This investigation was all based on free will, they were looking for men with a Y-chromosome DNA-profile like the perpetrator. This resulted in a DNA-match. On 18 November, Jasper Steringa (born 1967), a 45-year-old man from Aldwâld, only 2.5 km from the crime scene, was arrested. He did not immediately talk to the police but within 10 minutes of meeting his lawyer, he admitted to murdering Vaatstra. The next day police announced it had found a match. On 6 December, Jasper Steringa confessed to Vaatstra's murder.

== Murder ==
On the night of 1 May 1999, Steringa saw Vaatstra on her bike. He stated that he did not know her. Steringa forced Vaatstra with a knife into the field where she was later found dead. In a packed courtroom in Leeuwarden, Steringa described how he grabbed Vaatstra as she walked along a path in Feankleaster on the night of 30 April 1999. Steringa, now 45, said he was hit by the sudden thought: “You’re mine.” He pulled out a pocket knife, seized the girl and raped her before strangling her with her own bra. He then slit her throat with three strokes of the knife. “I don’t know where that thought came from,” he told the court on the first day of a hearing to outline the facts of the case. “I’ve never had that thought before or since. My conscience switched off. I don’t know how or why.” The killing was an act of panic when he realised the consequences of being caught for rape. “I just thought of my family and the discovery and what would happen after that. It all hit me at once.” The murder of Vaatstra sparked a huge police hunt and sent shockwaves through the Frisian community.

The only clue was a cigarette lighter found at the scene, which had been bought locally and contained a trace of the killer's DNA. He told the court he had chosen to keep quiet to save his young children from the experience of growing up with a father in prison. “In the last 13 years I considered several times whether to go to the police”, he said. “But everyone could see how much uproar the case had caused. “I’d destroyed her family. I couldn’t change that. I decided to spare my family the pain. My children were five and eight years old at the time.” But he realised that it was a matter of time before the past caught up with him. When police finally gained permission for the unprecedented large-scale DNA sweep, Jasper Steringa consented to give a sample, knowing that he would otherwise be identified through his close relatives. Even as his unmasking became inevitable, Steringa admitted he lacked the “courage” to go to the police confess to the crime. Instead he waited six months for the results to confirm what he knew and the moment that came on the night of 18 November 2012, when police arrived at his farm in Aldwâld to arrest him for Vaatstra's murder.

== Trial ==
Steringa's criminal trial opened on 28 March 2013. The public prosecutor asked for a twenty-year sentence for the perpetrator. On 19 April, the court in Leeuwarden sentenced Steringa to a term of 18 years in prison for the rape and murder of Vaatstra.

== Further developments ==
Vaatstra's father Bauke Vaatstra was awarded the "Machiavelli Prize" in 2013, for forcing a breakthrough in the use of DNA profiling as a means of investigation. The award became controversial after the director the NGO VluchtelingenWerk, which looks after the interests of refugees, filed a complaint against Vaatstra, who allegedly had made death threats against him in 1999. The police did not investigate, since the statute had expired. Vaatstra denied having made the threats.

Later in 2013, author Wim Dankbaar was sued by Vaatstra's mother Maaike Terpstra, when Dankbaar planned to publish her diaries. Dankbaar, a former collaborator of crime reporter Peter R. de Vries (who distanced himself from Dankbaar), cited from the diaries (obtained via a friend of Terpstra's) in the context of his conspiracy theory regarding the murder case.

Another conspiracy theorist, Micha Kat, was arrested in January 2013 for threatening Jasper S.'s lawyer. He had accused the attorney of being "one of Jasper's executioners", involved in a conspiracy to use Jasper S. as a scapegoat. Kat was tried for making death threats, as well as several unrelated allegations, including that of Holocaust denial.

== See also ==
- Death of Nicky Verstappen
- Killing of Nicole van den Hurk
