= De Westereen =

- Village
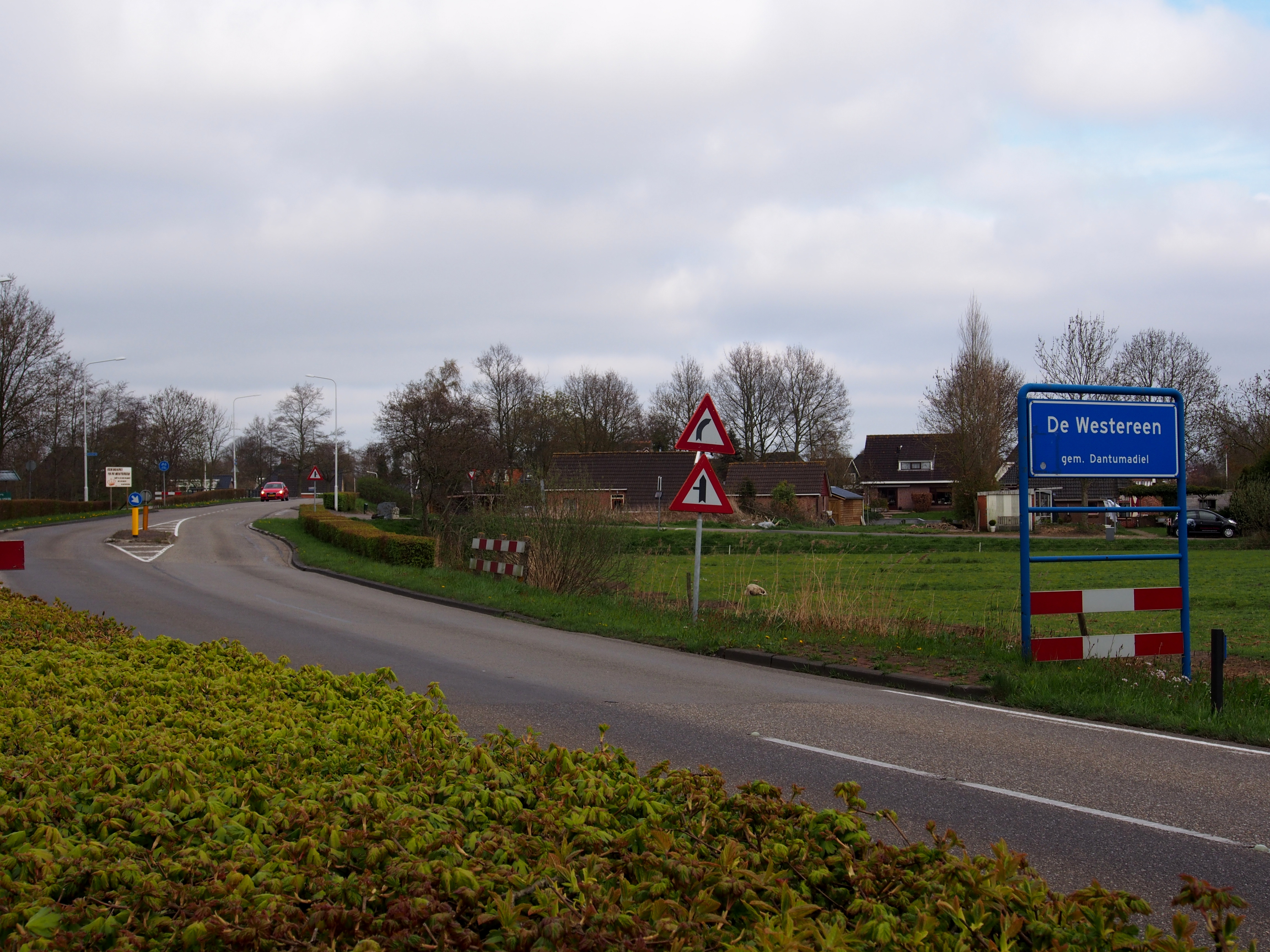
- Town sign

- Flag Coat of arms

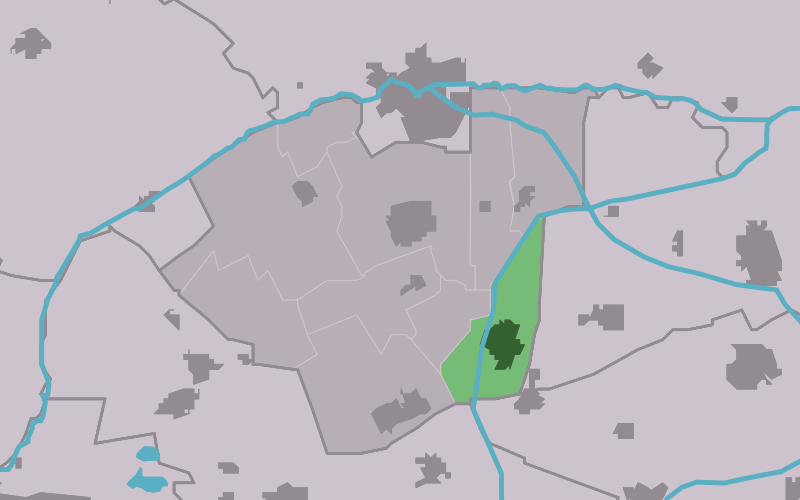
- Location in Dantumadiel municipality

- Location in the Netherlands De Westereen (Netherlands)
- Country: Netherlands
- Province: Friesland
- Municipality: Dantumadiel

Population (2017)
  - Total: 5,000
- Time zone: UTC+1 (CET)
  - Summer (DST): UTC+2 (CEST)

De Westereen (sometimes referred to as De Westerein in West Frisian and as Zwaagwesteinde in Dutch) is a village in the Dantumadiel municipality of Friesland, the Netherlands. It had a population of around 5,000 in 2017.

== History ==
De Westereen lies on the edge of the clay ridge of Kollum and Kollumersweach. The place name refers to the fact it lies on the western end of it, on the edge of lower-lying peat area. In 1503 the place was mentioned as Westereynde, in 1511 as Op eijnd, Swaga west eijnd, in 1573 as Westen Eijnde, in 1718 as Swaagwesterend and in 1786 as Zwaag-Westeinde. Zwaag refers to the land where cattle were kept, the pasture.

In the 18th century the village grew on the northern side on the peatland, which was cultivated at that time. Most dwellings of this extension were heather and turf huts. The number of the huts grew quickly beyond the number of the already existing small forest farms the on Foarstrjitte that where there when they started the cultivation of the peatland. In the 20th century all of the huts were replaced with stone houses, most of them pretty small. The last turf hut, in Dutch called spitketen was torn down in 1939.

The village was well into the 20th century also well known for its peddlers, traveling vendors that went from door to door all over the north of the Netherlands. It was the peddler place of Friesland.

Up until 1 January 2009, the official name for the village was Zwaagwesteinde. In 2008 the municipality Dantumadiel decided that it was going the replace all the official Dutch names within the municipality with the West Frisian names. For Zwaagwesteinde it was decided the follow the name in the local form of the West Frisian language, De Westereen. In West Frisian the preferred spelling was until then De Westerein, which was on the town sign together with the Dutch name Zwaagwesteinde before the change. Today, the official name De Westereen is used in both standard West Frisian and Dutch.
