= Tochmaland, Kollum =

Smock mill in the Netherlands

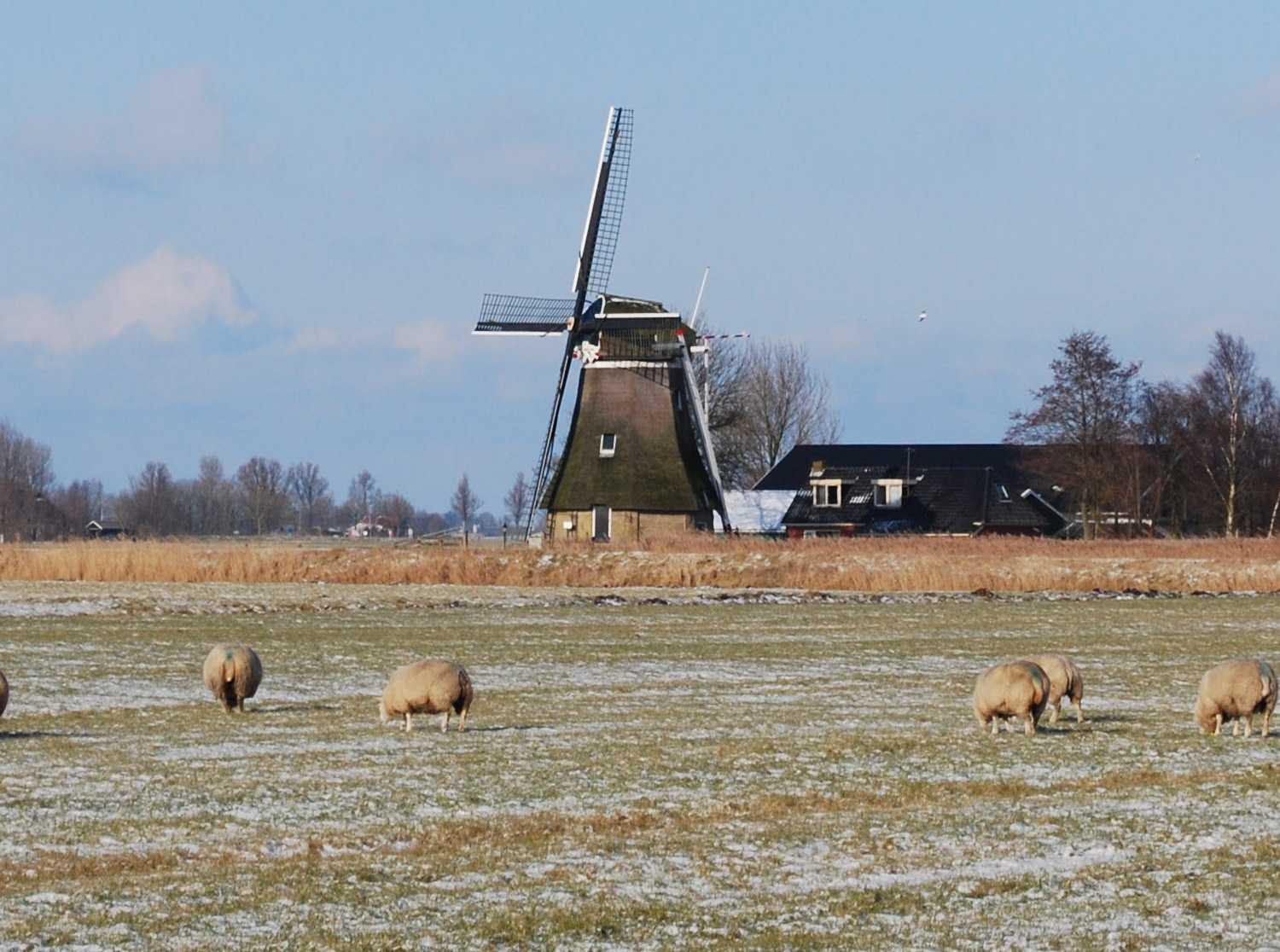
- Tochmaland, February 2009.

Origin
- Mill name: Tochmaland
- Mill location: Tochamaland 1, 9291 LC Kollum
- Coordinates: 53°17′25″N 6°08′46″E
- Operator(s): Monumentenstichting Kollumerland
- Year built: 1893

Information
- Purpose: Drainage mill
- Type: Smock mill
- Storeys: Two-storey smock
- Base storeys: Single-storey base
- No. of sails: Four sails
- Type of sails: Common sails
- Windshaft: Cast iron
- Winding: Tailpole and winch
- Auxiliary power: Electric motor
- Type of pump: Archimedes' screw

Tochmaland is a smock mill in Kollum, Friesland, Netherlands, which was built in 1893. The mill has been restored to working order. It is listed as a Rijksmonument, number 23743.

== History ==
Tochmaland was built in to drain the 550 hectares (1,400 acres) Tochmaland polder. It was originally the sawmill Welgelegen, Veendam, Groningen. The mill was moved by millwright J B Donders of Tilburg, North Brabant, who had quoted a lower price for the move than millwrights from Kollum. It was formerly fitted with four patent sails. The mill ceased working in 1946 when the windshaft broke and repair was deemed too expensive. A brick shed containing an electrically driven Archimedes' screw was erected next to the mill.

A proposal to demolish the mill was rejected by the mayor of the gemeente Kollumerland en Nieuwkruisland. On 30 December 1948, the mill was purchased by the gemeente. Restorations were undertaken in 1949, 1963 and 1983. since 1995, an electric motor has been installed in Tochmaland to drive its Archimedes' screw, and the installation in the brick shed demolished.

== Description ==
Tochmaland is what the Dutch describe as an Grondzeiler. It is a two-storey smock mill on a single-storey base. There is no stage, the sails reaching down almost to ground level. The mill is winded by tailpole and winch. The smock and cap are thatched. The sails are Common sails. They have a span of 23.54 metres (77 ft 3 in). The sails are carried on a cast-iron windshaft which was cast by H J Koning, Foxham, Groningen, in 1912. The windshaft also carries the brake wheel which has 63 cogs. This drives the wallower (33 cogs) at the top of the upright shaft. At the bottom of the upright shaft is the crown wheel, which has 44 cogs drives a gearwheel with 41 cogs on the axle of the Archimedes' screw. The axle of the Archimedes' screw is 445 millimetres (1 ft 6 in) diameter. The screw is 1.63 metres (5 ft 4 in) diameter and 5.50 metres (18 ft 1 in) long. It is inclined at 19½°. Each revolution of the screw lifts 1,347 litres (296 imp gal) of water.

== Public access ==
Tochmaland is open on Saturday mornings from 9:30 a.m. to 12:00 p.m.
