= Death of Nicky Verstappen =

Child sexual abuse and homicide case in the Netherlands

- Nicky Verstappen
- Date: 10 or 11 August 1998
- Location: Landgraaf, Limburg, Netherlands; 50.918621°N 6.010346°E
- Type: Homicide
- Convicted: Joseph Theresia Johannes Brech
- Trial: 28 September – 16 October 2020 (lower court); 10–24 November 2021 (appeal court)
- Verdict: 20 November 2020 (lower court); 28 January 2022 (appeal court)
- Convictions: Manslaughter; Kidnapping; Child sexual abuse; Possession of child pornography
- Sentence: 12.5 years' imprisonment (lower court)^{α} 16 years' imprisonment (appeal court)

On the morning of 10 August 1998, 11-year-old Nicky Verstappen disappeared from a summer camp he was attending in Brunssum, Limburg. His body was found on the evening of 11 August, 1.2 kilometres (0.75 mi) away in Landgraaf, and a murder investigation was subsequently launched. Despite extensive investigation, the case remained unsolved for over twenty years.

Joseph Theresia Johannes "Jos" Brech (born 29 October 1962 in Venlo) stood trial for the killing of Verstappen in 2020. He was arrested on 26 August 2018 in Spain after DNA from his belongings and relatives matched samples taken from Verstappen's clothing, following the largest DNA-harvesting operation in Dutch history. On 20 November 2020, Brech was acquitted of manslaughter, but found guilty of the kidnapping and sexual abuse that led to Verstappen's death, as well as of possession of child pornography. He was sentenced to twelve-and-a-half years' imprisonment. On 28 January 2022, an appeal court convicted Brech for manslaughter, kidnapping, sexual abuse and the child pornography charge, and increased his sentence to 16 years, a decision that was later upheld by the Supreme Court.

== Disappearance and body discovery ==
1 Location of the tent Verstappen disappeared from
2 Location where Verstappen's body was found

On Saturday 8 August 1998, Verstappen and 36 other children took a bus from Heibloem to Brunssum to take part in a children's summer camp being held on the De Heikop campgrounds on the Brunssummerheide. Verstappen was last seen alive around 5:30 a.m. on 10 August by a tentmate; later that morning, he was no longer in his sleeping bag, and only his shoes were still in the tent. On 11 August, police and volunteers, including Verstappen's parents, conducted a search for the boy; around 9 p.m., his body was found in a pine grove on the Schinvelderweg in Landgraaf, 1.2 kilometres (0.75 mi) from the camp. He was found barefoot and without a shirt, but wearing his pajama bottoms and underwear; The pajama bottoms were inside-out and backwards, indicating they had likely been hastily put back on at some point. Additionally, upon Verstappen's discovery, the soles of his feet were clean and showed no evidence of having walked barefoot through the forest or on bare ground, leading to speculation that he was abducted and carried. At the time of Verstappen's discovery, local medical examiners had apparently been vacationing and were not immediately available, thus delaying a post-mortem examination for several days. The body showed signs of possible sexual abuse, and a possible head injury was considered, but the examination could not determine an exact cause of death; an initial examination for foreign DNA yielded nothing. A tissue (containing trace amounts of semen) and a cigarette butt were found near where the body was discovered; from this DNA, a complete profile was compiled. The pathologists examining the boy's body found evidence that he had suffered rectal trauma which they believed to have been caused by penile penetration or by a smooth, large object.

== Investigation ==
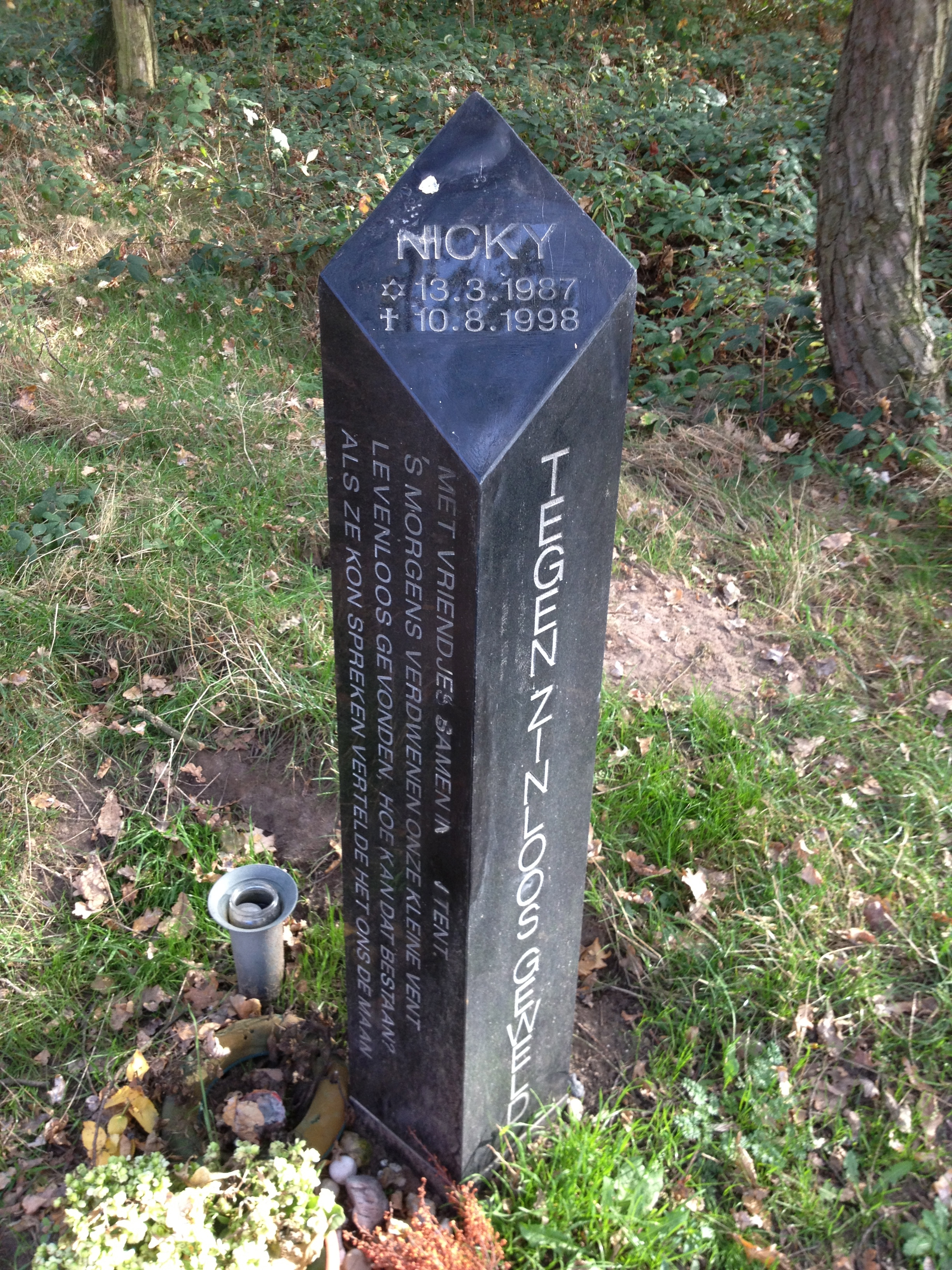
Monument for Verstappen on the Brunssummerheide, near where his body was found.

Joos Barten, the founder of the camp Verstappen disappeared from, was extensively questioned by police in the days following. A former headmaster of the local primary school in Heibloem, Barten had convictions for child sexual abuse and admitted to being near the tent Verstappen slept in at 6 a.m. on 10 August. During the search for Verstappen, he pointed several times in the direction where the body was eventually discovered. A 15-year-old girl who had attended the teenagers' camp on De Heikop a few days earlier suspected that she had been sexually abused by Barten in her sleep. None of the camp staff were officially held as suspects.

A reward of 25,000 guilders was offered by the Openbaar Ministerie in Maastricht for information on the identity of the perpetrator; this offer was doubled in 1999 with money raised by crime reporter Peter R. de Vries, who became a spokesperson for Verstappen's family. Following a lack of leads, the investigation team was dissolved in November 1998, with a new team of investigators taking over the case between November 2000 and July 2001. Between 2001 and 2007, a sex offender from Kerkrade was in and out of police custody while a number of witnesses claimed to have seen him in and around the camp around 10 August 1998; the sex offender died in August 2007. The case has also been linked to German serial killer Martin Ney, who killed three boys between 1992 and 2001.

Seven or eight letters written by an anonymous author suggesting they had killed Verstappen were found on a monument for the boy on the Brunssummerheide between 2005 and July 2006. In January 2007, a 36-year-old man from Landgraaf was arrested on suspicion of having written the letters. He was released two weeks later, before being re-arrested in December for vandalising the monument. One month later, he was sentenced to three months' imprisonment for the vandalism. The monument was vandalised again in April 2008, August 2013 and April 2019.

=== DNA profiling ===
Between December 1999 and January 2000, 35 men took part in a DNA test, but none of the samples matched those found at the crime scene. In 2010, with foreign DNA having been found on Verstappen's body, police took DNA samples from 80 men, but still did not find a matching sample. In November of that year, the remains of Joos Barten, the camp founder, who died in 2003, were exhumed for a DNA test. His DNA also did not match that found on Verstappen's body.

In January 2018, it was announced that 21,500 men in the Limburg province would be asked to give samples of their DNA in an attempt to trace Verstappen's killer. The DNA-screening program took place between February and June, with a total of over 15,000 samples collected—the largest number in Dutch history, almost twice the number of samples collected in the program that successfully traced the man who was convicted of Marianne Vaatstra's murder.

On 22 August 2018, it was announced that DNA samples from the belongings and relatives of a 55-year-old man originally from Simpelveld, Joseph Theresia Johannes "Jos" Brech, matched DNA found on Verstappen's clothing. Brech, who had been missing from his Vosges home since April of that year, had not responded to requests for a sample of his DNA and his immediate family also refused to cooperate in the DNA-screening program. A police team managed to retrieve a sample of Brech's DNA from his personal items after he was reported missing. Brech had a history of sexually abusing children and was known to have been near the scene of the crime around the time it took place, though he was believed at the time to just be a passer-by. The gendarme who wrote down his name was later killed in action in Iraq. Police located and arrested Brech in Spain, near Castellterçol, on 26 August, and he was extradited to the Netherlands on 6 September.

== Trial ==
The trial began on 28 September 2020 and lasted three weeks. Brech denied being guilty of the charges. In a pre-recorded video message played in court, Brech said that on 11 August 1998—hours before Verstappen's body was found by the search party—he was walking close to the edge of a forest when he "saw something in the distance" and went to look out of curiosity, finding the body. He said that his DNA was found on the body because he had checked for signs of life, brushed leaves off the body and then left without any other action because of his previous convictions. In total, 27 traces of Brech's DNA had been found on the body, including on the boy's underwear; Brech said he had "no idea" how his DNA ended up on the underwear. The prosecution contested Brech's assertions, referencing a photograph taken of the location of where the body was found in a pine grove and a screenshot from a video of the location Brech said he was standing when he "saw something". According to the prosecution, it would not have been possible for Brech to have seen Verstappen's body lying behind a chain-link fence and obscured from view by trees. Brech's lawyer argued that Brech had said in his video message that he "saw something"—not clarifying whether it was the body—from where he was standing that drew his attention to the pine grove. A forensic pathologist who had reviewed the post-mortem could not ascertain whether the injury to Verstappen's body was caused by sexual abuse, due to the poor quality of the photographs and the fact that the pathologist who conducted the post-mortem had since died.

The prosecution deemed Brech's assertions to be "wafer-thin and unbelievable", saying that they believed him to be guilty of the kidnapping, sexual abuse and aggravated manslaughter of Verstappen, and that although the medical cause of death was not determined, the boy's death could not have been the result of anything other than a criminal act, as he was healthy and had no genetic disorder. According to them, evidence at the crime scene indicated Verstappen died at the same location his body was found. On 8 October, the prosecution requested a sentence of 15 years' imprisonment and compulsory treatment (or 18 years' imprisonment if the court decided not to impose compulsory treatment) for Brech for the kidnapping, sexual abuse and manslaughter of Verstappen, as well as for possession of child pornography. On 20 November, the court found Brech guilty of kidnapping and sexually abusing Verstappen, saying the multiple traces of Brech's DNA found on Verstappen's body, including on the boy's underwear, indicated prolonged physical contact of a sexual nature that Verstappen could not possibly have consented to. The court cited the manner of Brech's previous offences against children, which involved him restraining his victims by placing his hand over their mouths, and while not ruling out the possibility that Brech intentionally suffocated and killed Verstappen, the court took into account the possibility that the boy died accidentally as Brech attempted to restrain him. Brech was therefore acquitted of manslaughter, though the court maintained that Verstappen's death was the result of Brech's actions. Brech was given a 12-year prison sentence for the kidnapping and sexual abuse of Verstappen, as well as a six-month sentence for possession of child pornography found on the laptop he left behind in France during his flight.^{[β]} Brech's lawyer announced that the verdict would be appealed.

== Appeals ==
On 28 January 2022, an appeal court in Den Bosch upheld the conviction of Brech for the abduction, sexual assault and manslaughter and increased the sentence to 16 years. A further appeal was made to the Supreme Court in September 2023, who ruled that the appeals court decision should stand, albeit with a three-month reduction given, due to the long duration of the trial.

== Notes ==
^α 12 years in the Nicky Verstappen case and 6 months for possession of child pornography.
^β Brech denied that his departure to Spain from France was a flight. Both the lower and appeal courts found that it was.

== See also ==
- Cold case
- Killing of Nicole van den Hurk
- Murder of Marianne Vaatstra
- Lists of solved missing person cases
