= TrueAllele =

DNA analysis software

TrueAllele is a software program by Cybergenetics that analyzes DNA using statistical methods, a process called probabilistic genotyping. It is used in forensic identification. The program can be used in situations unsuited to traditional methods, such as when a mixture of multiple people's DNA is in a sample.

Some studies, mostly conducted by Cybergenetics' Chief Scientific Officer Mark W. Perlin, have validated the program's accuracy. In one study, TrueAllele distinguished between the genetic code of first-degree relatives with "great accuracy". The President's Council of Advisors on Science and Technology has noted that many validation studies were made by people affiliated with TrueAllele and are therefore not independent, demanding more independent research. In one case, TrueAllele's results differed from the results of STRMix, another probabilistic genotyping program, leading to the judge rejecting the DNA evidence.

The proprietary nature of the code has led to concerns over its reliability. Unlike some similar programs, TrueAllele is not open source, so judges and attorneys cannot check the program's code.
