= Kollumerland en Nieuwkruisland =

Kollumerland en Nieuwkruisland Kollumerlân en Nijkrúslân Kollumerland c.a.
- Municipality
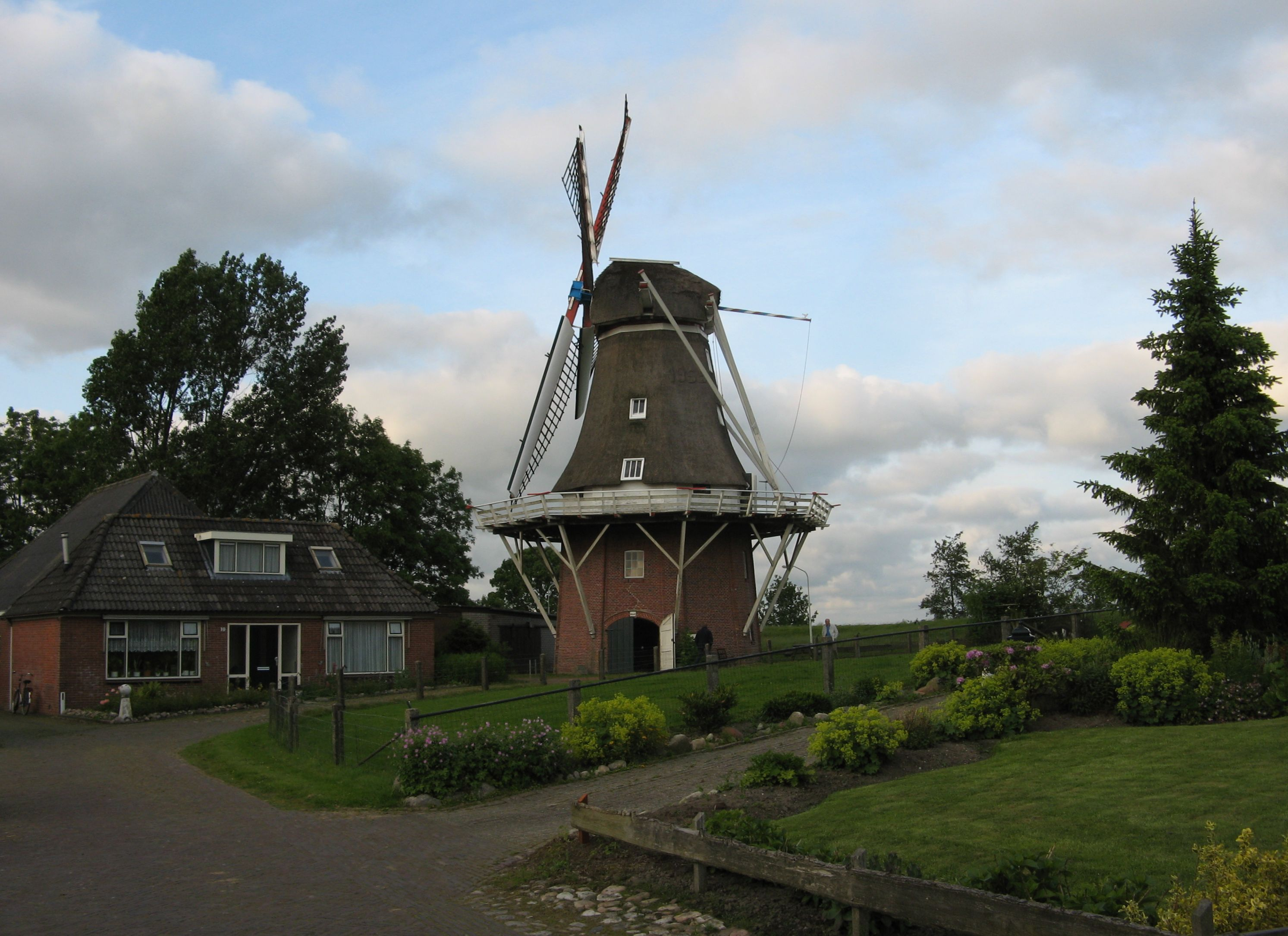
- Windmill Rust Roest

- Flag Coat of arms

- Location in Friesland
- Coordinates: 53°17′N 6°8′E
- Country: Netherlands
- Province: Friesland
- Merged: 2019

Area
  - Total: 116.35 km^{2} (44.92 sq mi)
  - Land: 109.75 km^{2} (42.37 sq mi)
  - Water: 6.60 km^{2} (2.55 sq mi)
- Elevation: 0.9 m (3.0 ft)
- Highest elevation: 1.6 m (5.2 ft)
- Lowest elevation: 0 m (0 ft)

Population (January 2021)
  - Total: data missing
- Time zone: UTC+1 (CET)
  - Summer (DST): UTC+2 (CEST)
- Postcode: 9291–9299, 9851–9853
- Area code: 0511, 0594
- Website: www.kollumerland.nl

Kollumerland en Nieuwkruisland (Dutch pronunciation; West Frisian: Kollumerlân en Nijkrúslân), officially abbreviated as Kollumerland c.a., is a former municipality in the northern Netherlands, located in the province of Friesland. In 2019 it merged with the municipalities of Dongeradeel and Ferwerderadiel to form the new municipality Noardeast-Fryslân.

== Population centres ==
Augsbuurt, Burum, Kollum, Kollumerpomp, Kollumerzwaag, Munnekezijl, Oudwoude, Triemen, Veenklooster, Warfstermolen, Westergeest and Zwagerbosch.

Kollumerland en Nieuwkruisland has a population of 12,775 (1 April 2016, source: CBS).

=== Topography ===
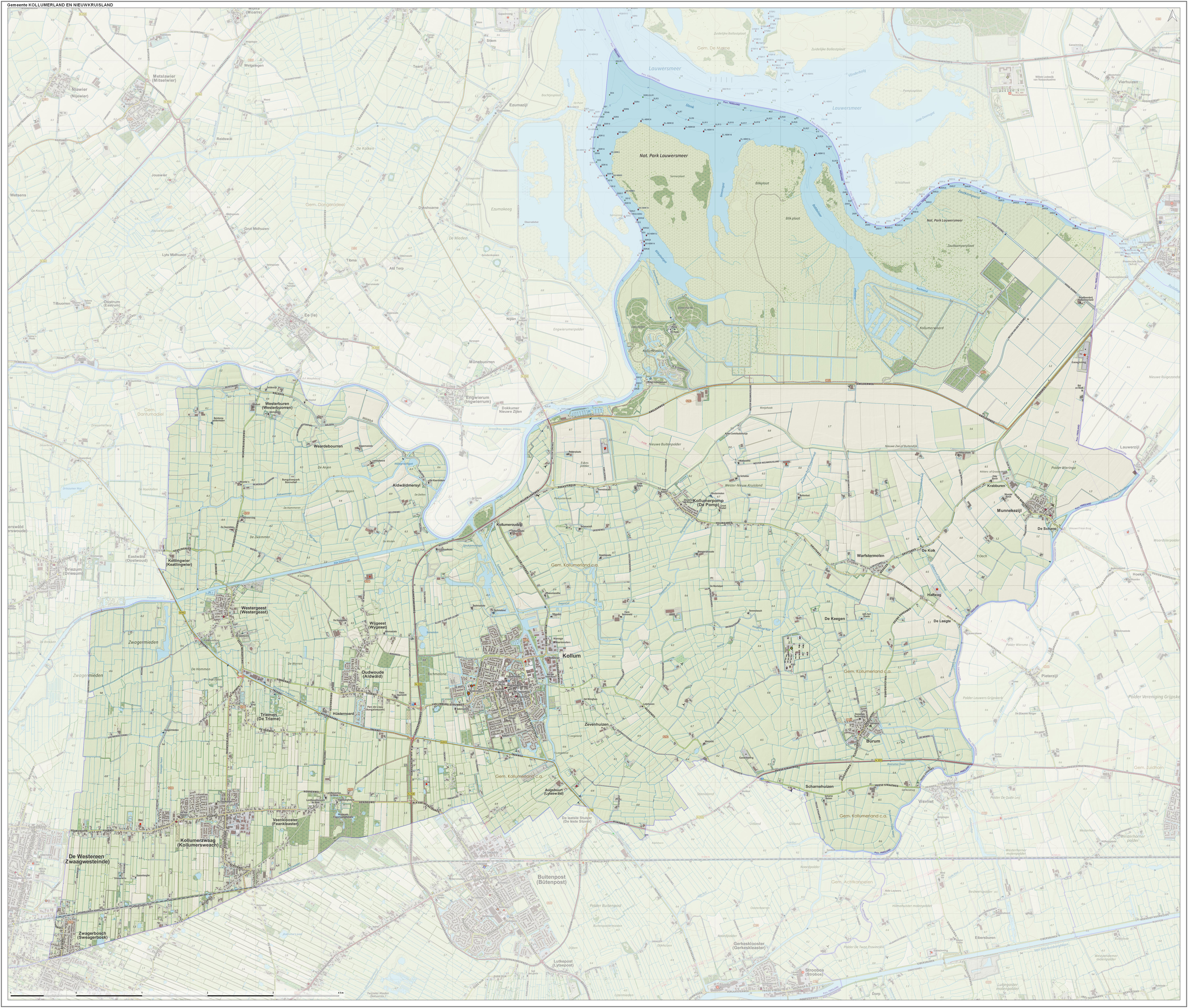

Dutch Topographic map of the municipality of Kollumerland en Nieuwkruisland, June 2015.

== Government ==
The Burum community houses the satellite ground station of the Nationale SIGINT Organisatie.
