= Kollumersweach =

Kollumersweach De Sweach Kölmerswoag
- Village
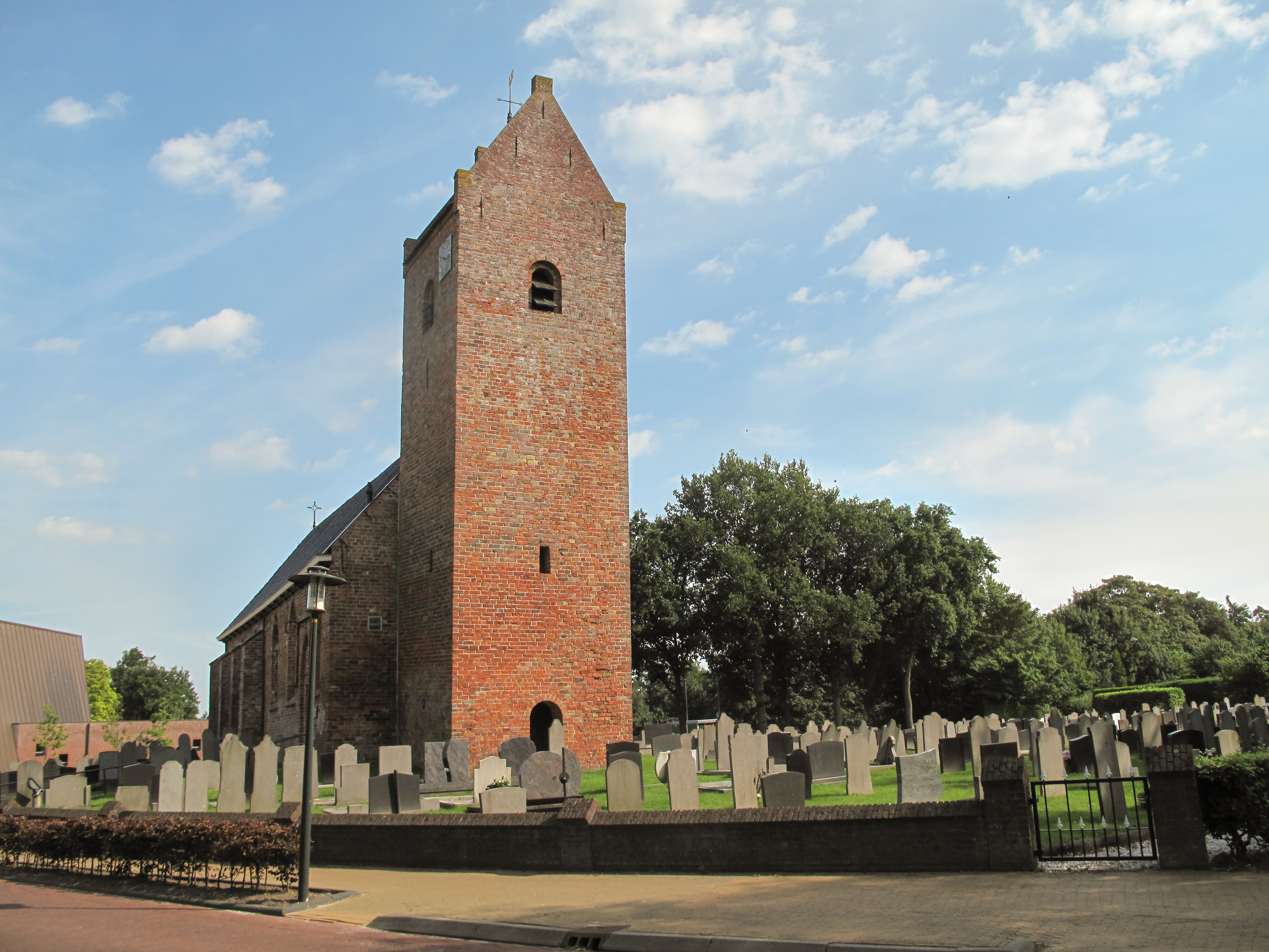
- Reformed church (Nederlands Hervormd)

- Flag Coat of arms

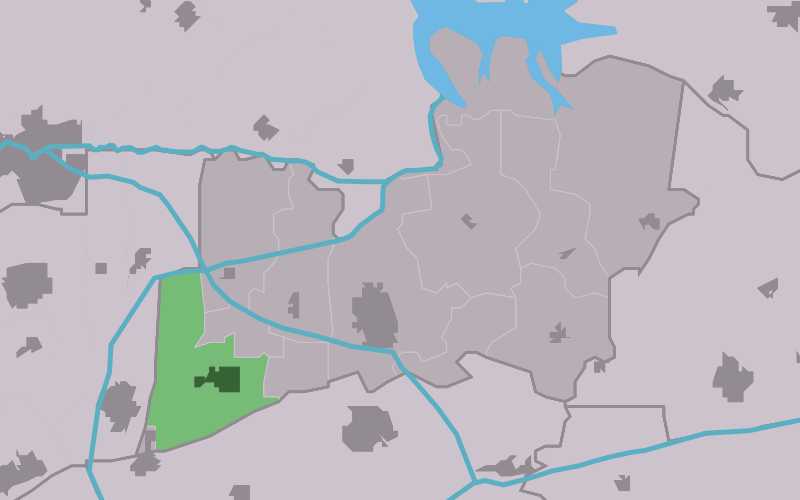
- Location in the former Kollumerland municipality

- Location in the Netherlands Kollumersweach (Netherlands)
- Country: Netherlands
- Province: Friesland
- Municipality: Noardeast-Fryslân

Area
  - Total: 11.36 km^{2} (4.39 sq mi)
- Elevation: 3 m (9.8 ft)

Population (2021)
  - Total: 2,976
  - Density: 262.0/km^{2} (678.5/sq mi)
- Time zone: UTC+1 (CET)
  - Summer (DST): UTC+2 (CEST)
- Postal code: 9298
- Dialing code: 0511

Kollumersweach (Low German: Kölmerswoag, locally also known as De Sweach) is a village in Noardeast-Fryslân in the province of Friesland, the Netherlands. It had a population of around 2,992 in January 2017. Before 2019, the village was part of the Kollumerland en Nieuwkruisland municipality.

== History ==
The village was first mentioned in 1444 as Zwaech, and means (cattle) pasture belonging to Kollum. Kollumersweach developed on a clay ridge from which the heath was cultivated during the 11th and 12th century. It developed into a linear settlement. Originally there were two hamlets: Zwagerveen and Zandbulten. In 1971, they were merged and renamed to Kollumerzwaag. In 2023, the spelling was changed to Kollumersweach.

The Dutch Reformed church dates from the 12th century. The tower was added slightly later. The spire was replaced in 1872 and was altered in 1960 during restoration.

In 1840, Kollumersweach was home to 513 people. In the mid-19th century, the village started to industrialize and grow.

== Gallery ==
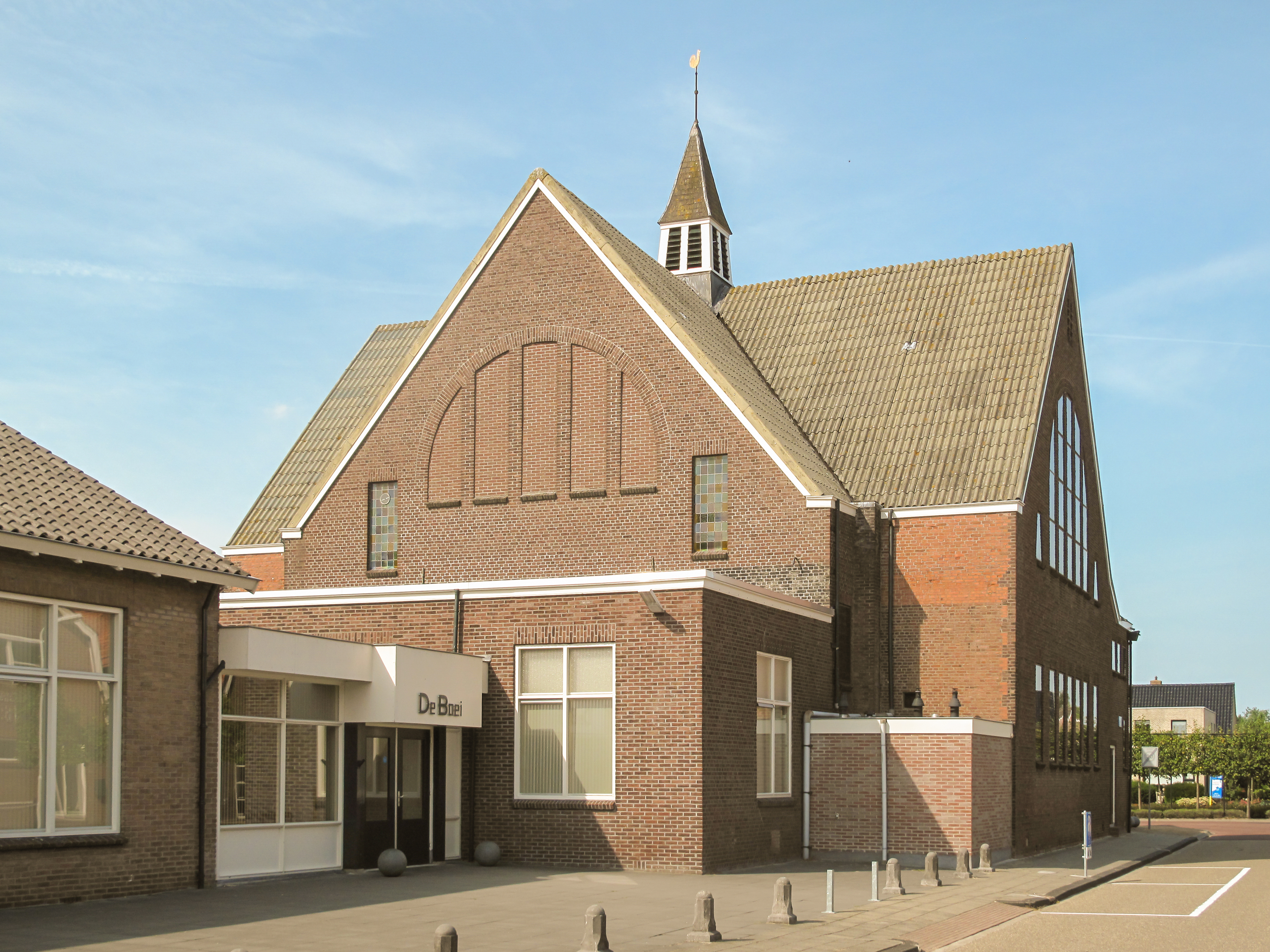
Reformed church (gereformeerd)

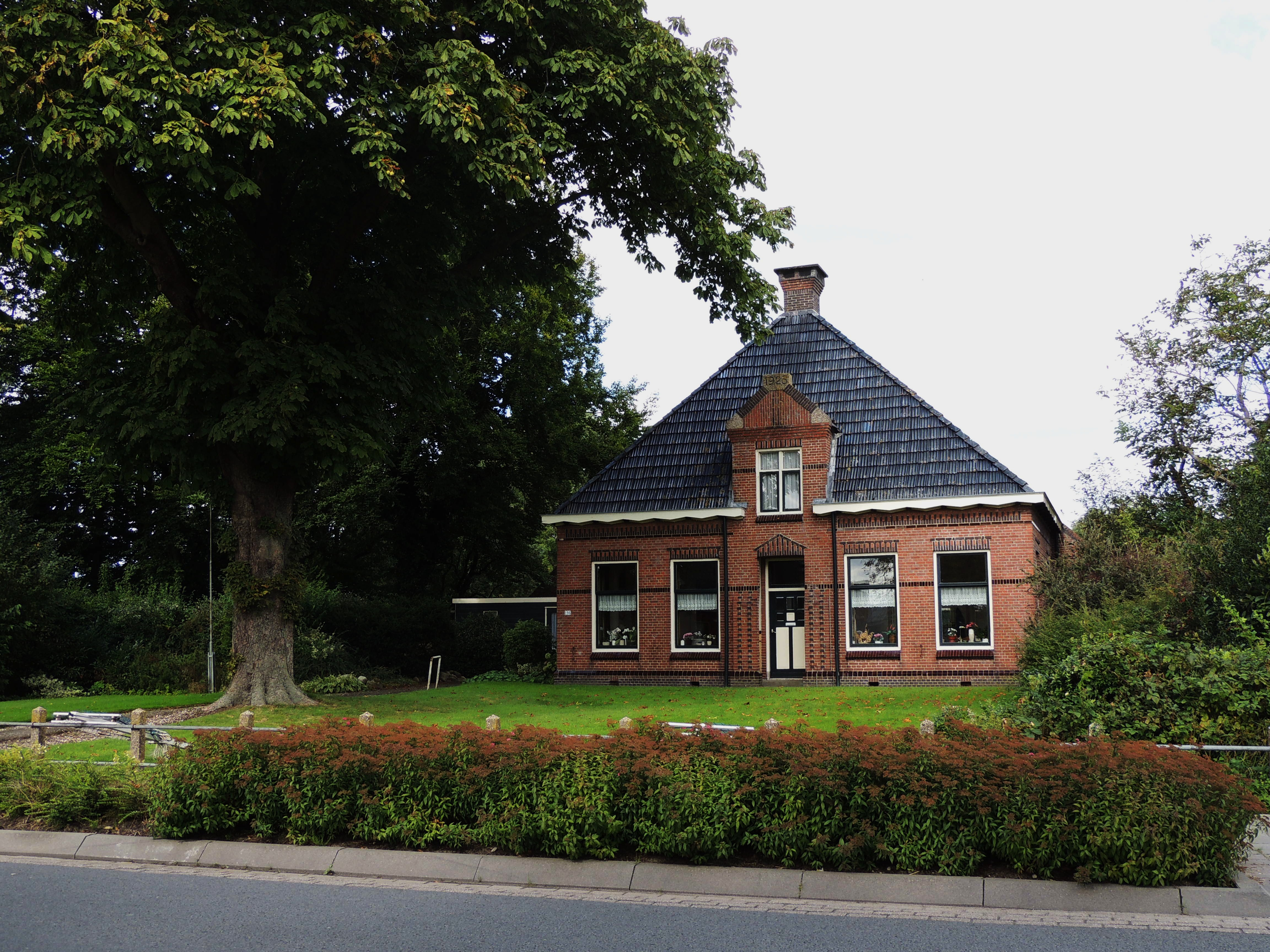
Farm in Kollumersweach

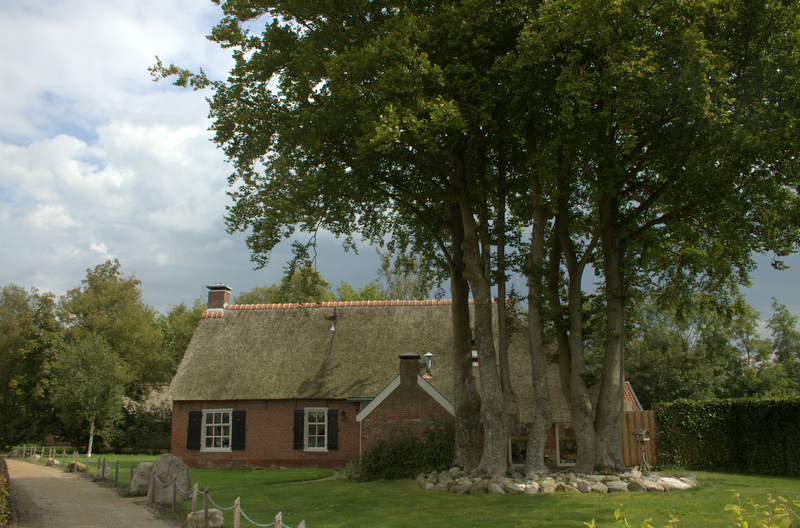
Farm in Kollumersweach

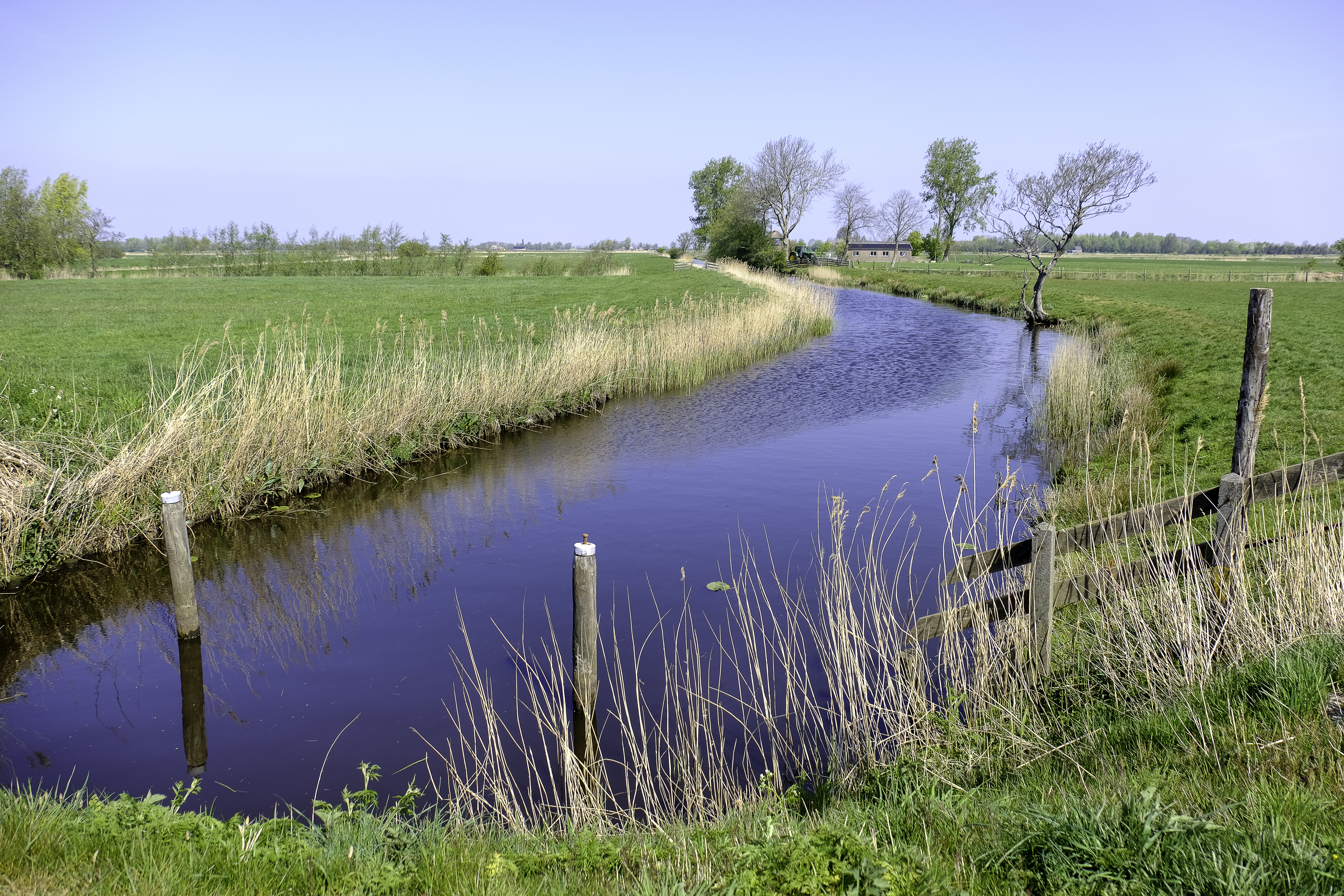
Landscape near Kollumersweach
