= Probabilistic genotyping =

Statistical method for DNA profiling

Probabilistic genotyping is the use of statistical methods and mathematical algorithms in DNA Profiling. It may be used instead of manual methods in difficult situations, such as when a DNA sample is very small or includes a mixture of multiple individuals' DNA. Probabilistic genotyping, unlike traditional methods, avoids the need for subjective judgment. The reliability of the method has been questioned by some defense lawyers because the source code of some probabilistic genotyping programs is proprietary.
