= Aldwâld =

- Village
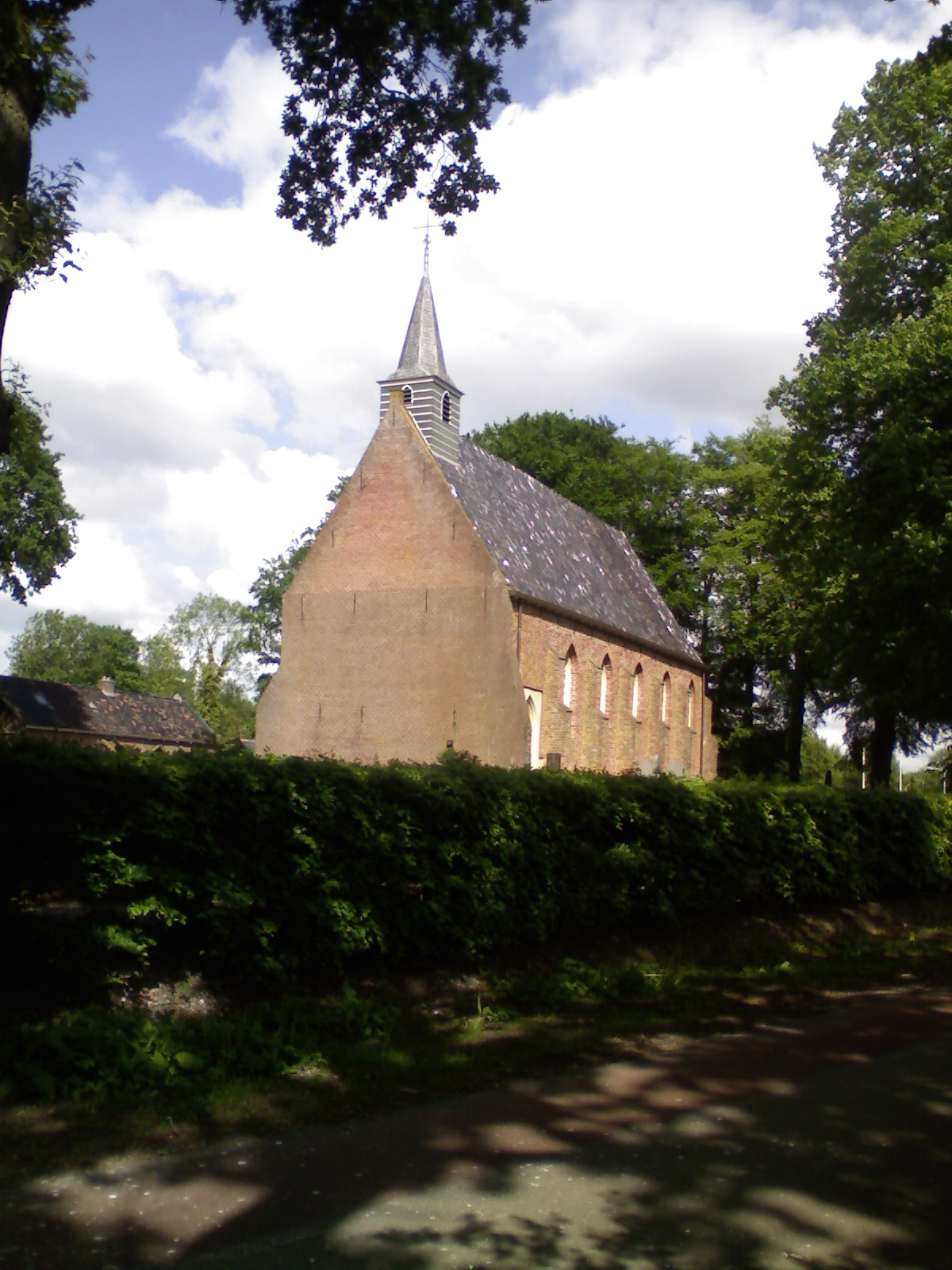
- Oudwoude church

- Flag Coat of arms

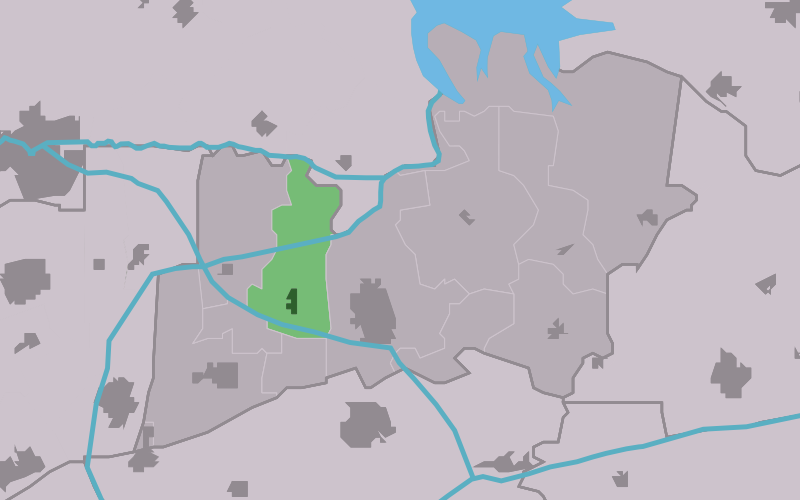
- Location in the former Kollumerland municipality

- Location in the Netherlands Aldwâld (Netherlands)
- Coordinates: 53.28049°N 6.11243°E
- Country: Netherlands
- Province: Friesland
- Municipality: Noardeast-Fryslân

Area
  - Total: 8.84 km^{2} (3.41 sq mi)
- Elevation: 1.3 m (4.3 ft)

Population (2021)
  - Total: 815
  - Density: 92.2/km^{2} (239/sq mi)
- Time zone: UTC+1 (CET)
  - Summer (DST): UTC+2 (CEST)
- Postal code: 9294
- Dialing code: 0511

Aldwâld (Dutch: Oudwoude) is a village in Noardeast-Fryslân municipality in the province of Friesland, the Netherlands. It had a population of around 832 in January 2017. Before 2019, the village was part of the Kollumerland en Nieuwkruisland municipality.

The village was first mentioned in 1444 as Oldewolde, and means old forest. Aldwâld is a linear settlement with two centres which developed during land cultivation in the Late Middle Ages. The Dutch Reformed church was built in the 15th century using material from its predecessor. The tower dates from 1880. In 1840, Aldwâld was home to 287 people.

The village's official name was changed from Oudwoude to Aldwâld in 2023.

== Gallery ==
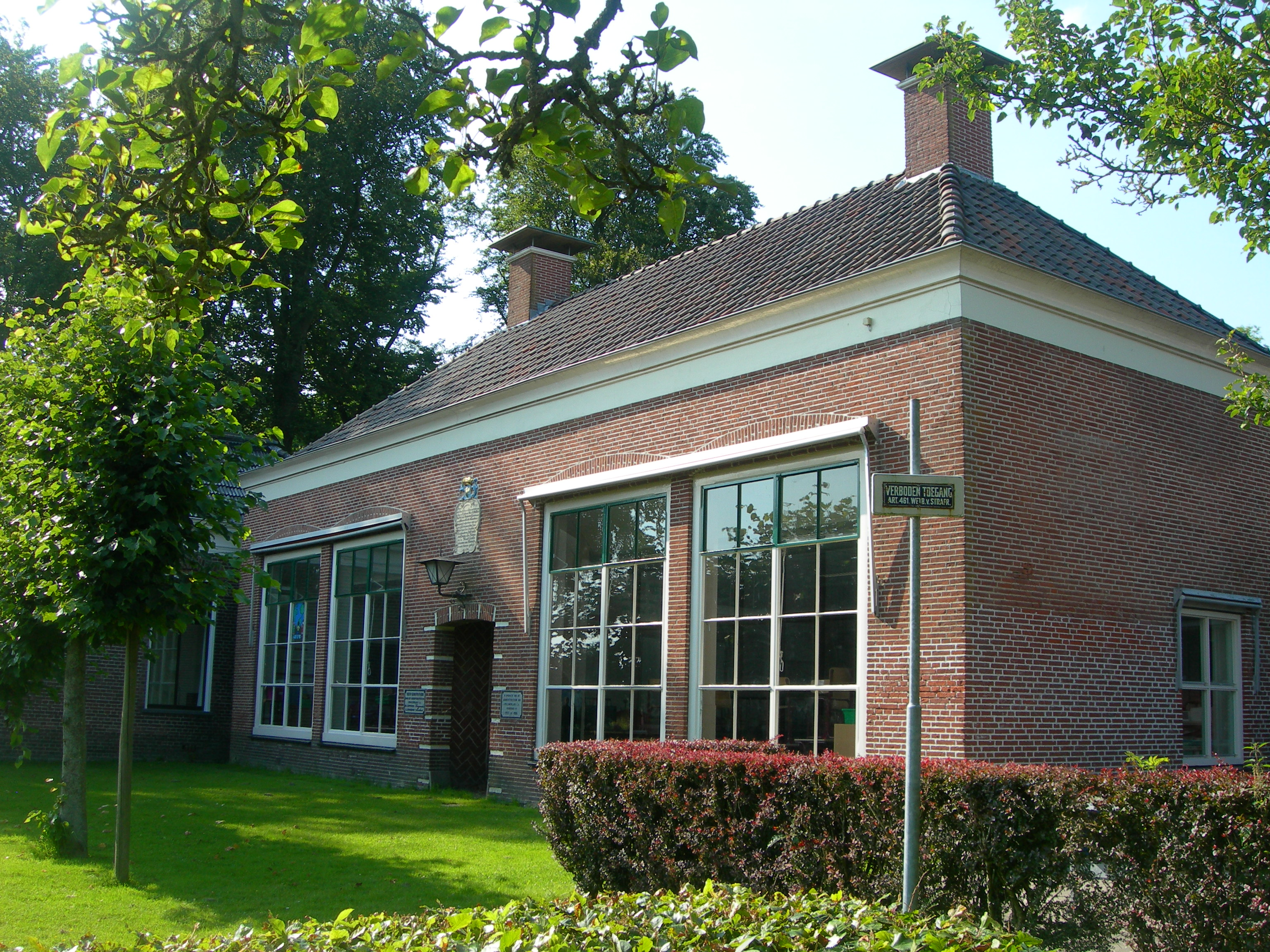
Primary school Aldwâld

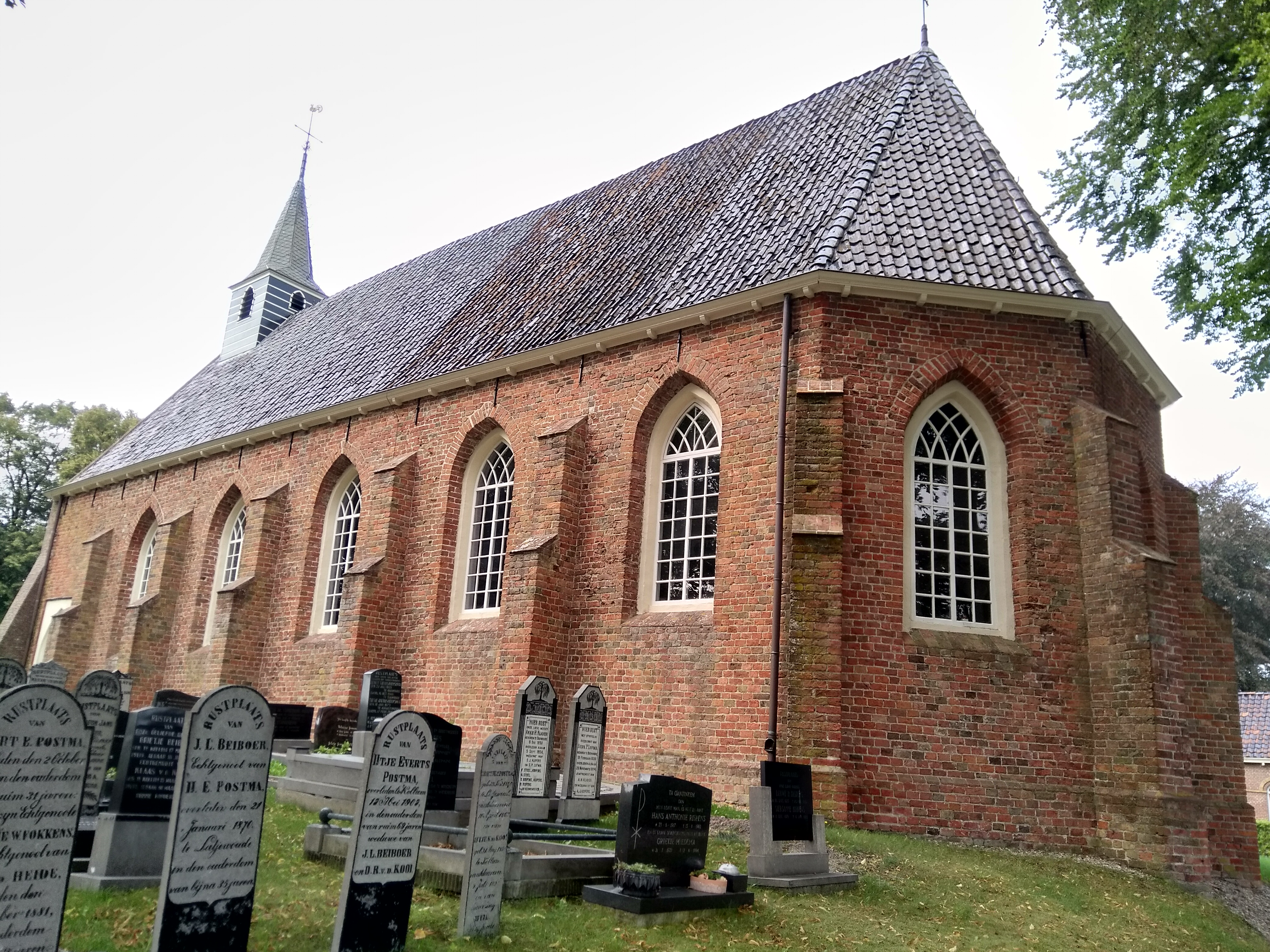
Protestant church Aldwâld

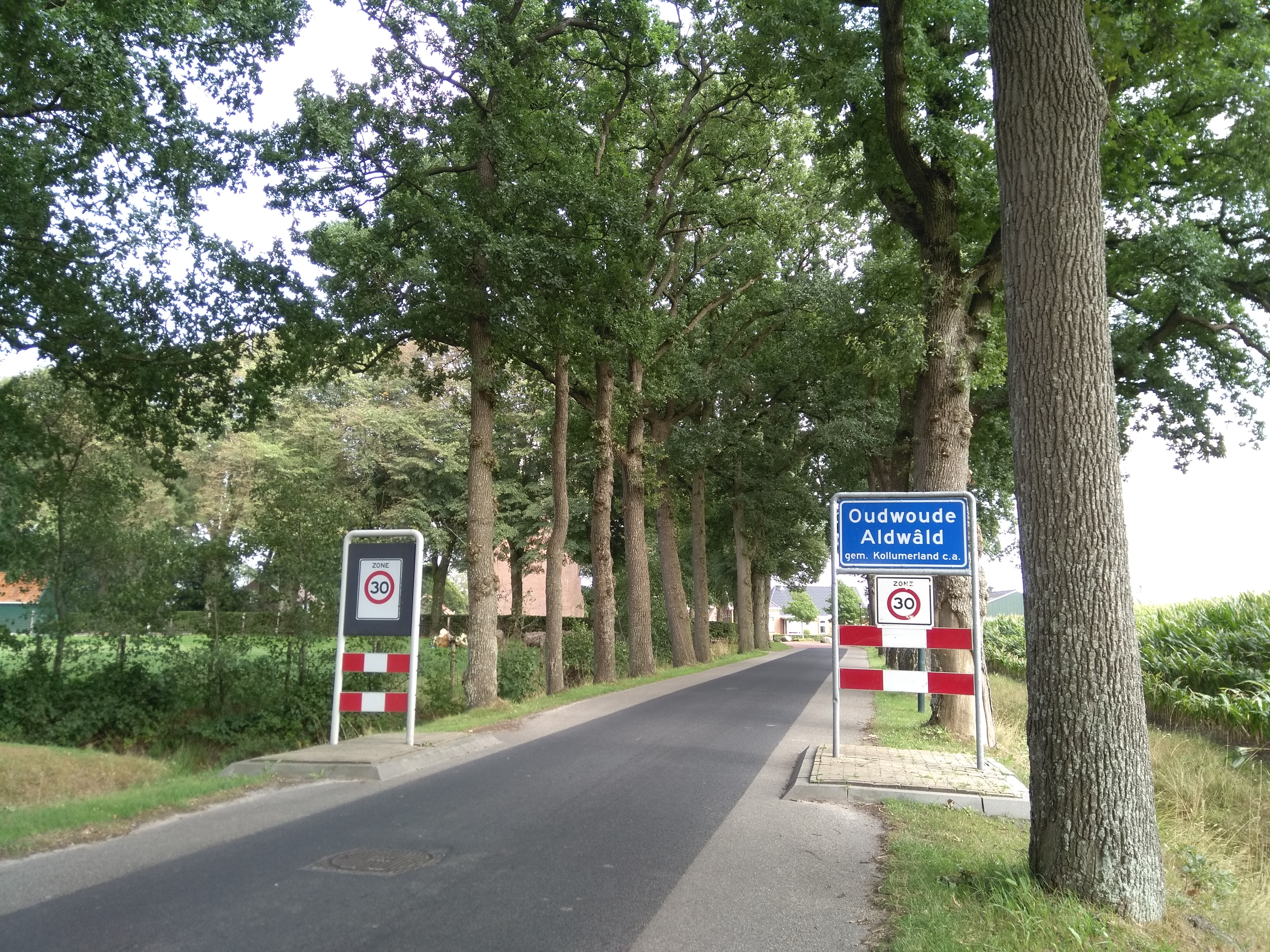
Aldwâld village sign

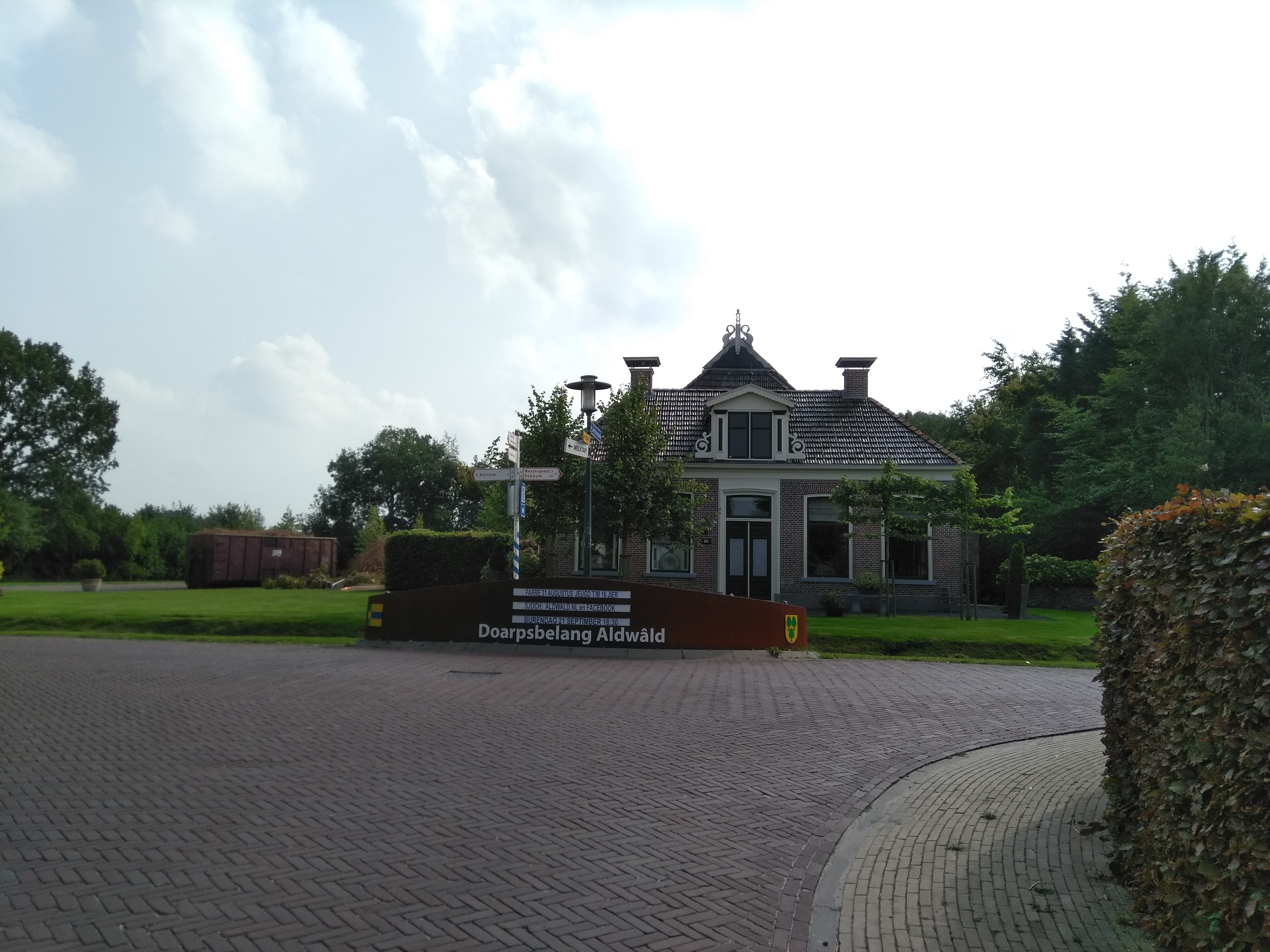
Foarwei and Jan Binnenswei crossing

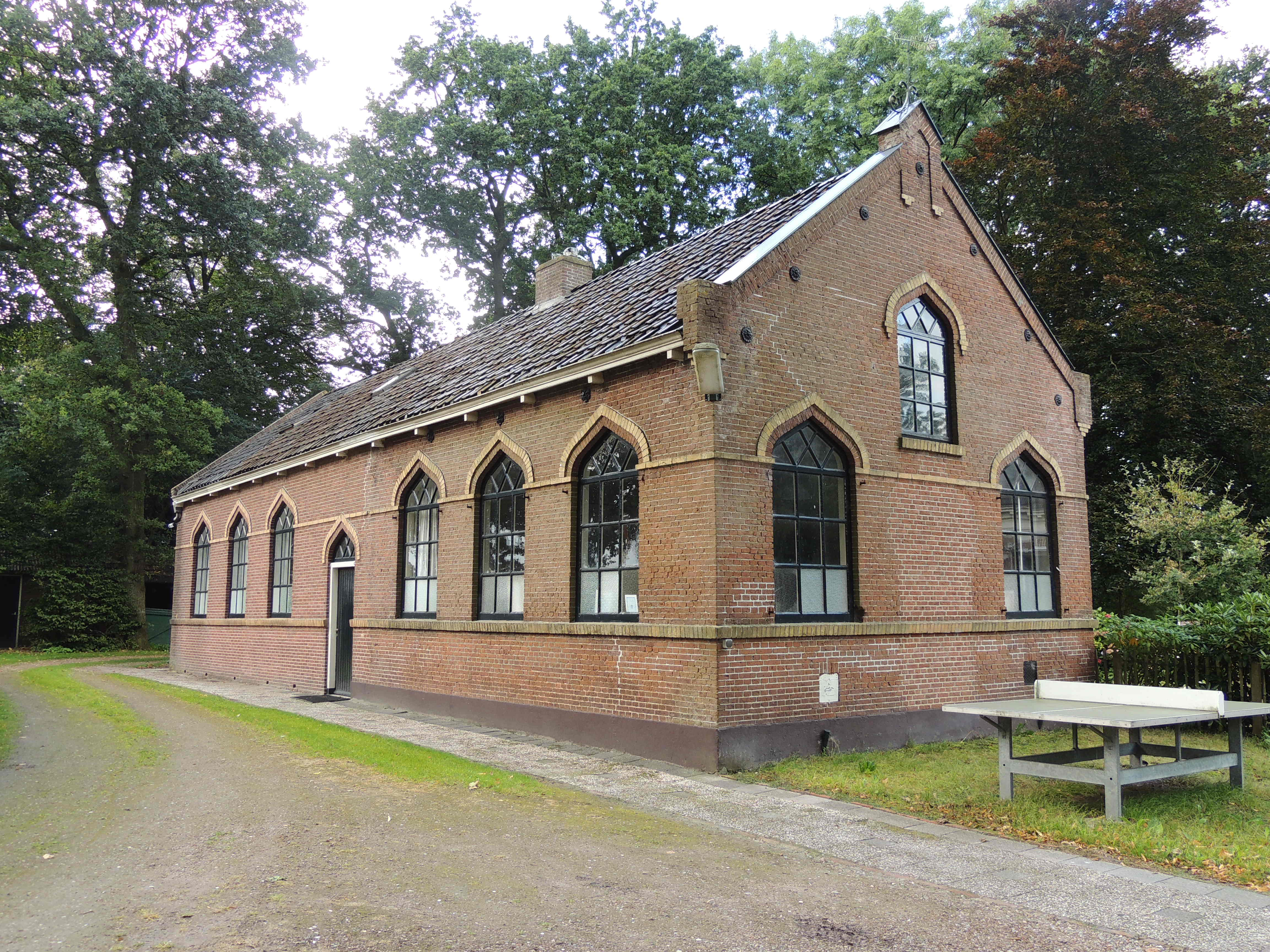
Aldwâld association building

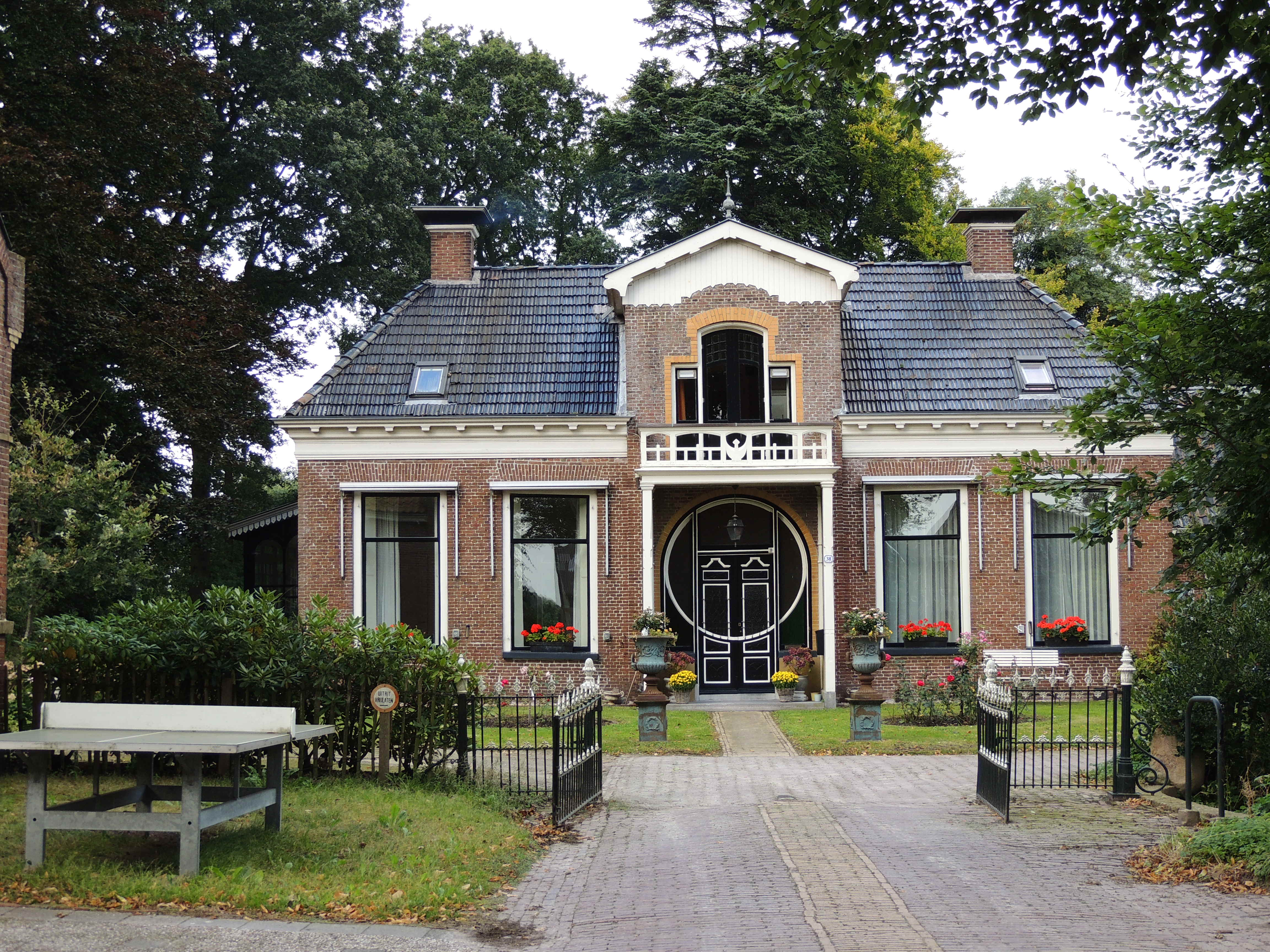
Vicarage
