= Kollum =

- Village
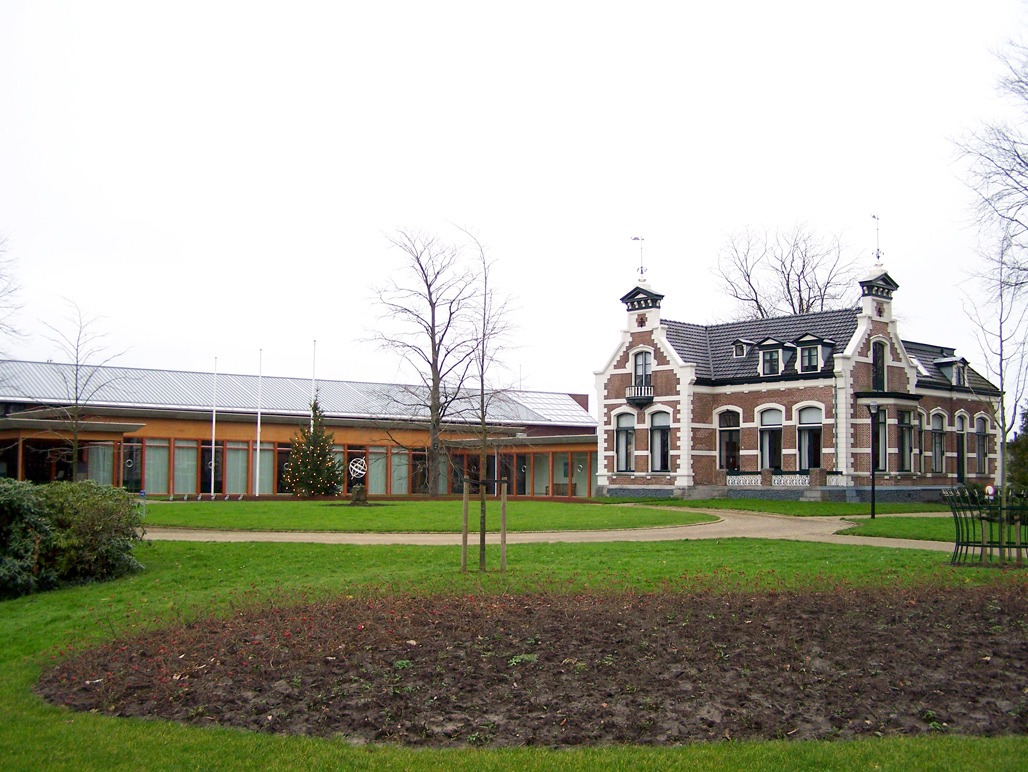
- Kollum town hall

- Flag Coat of arms

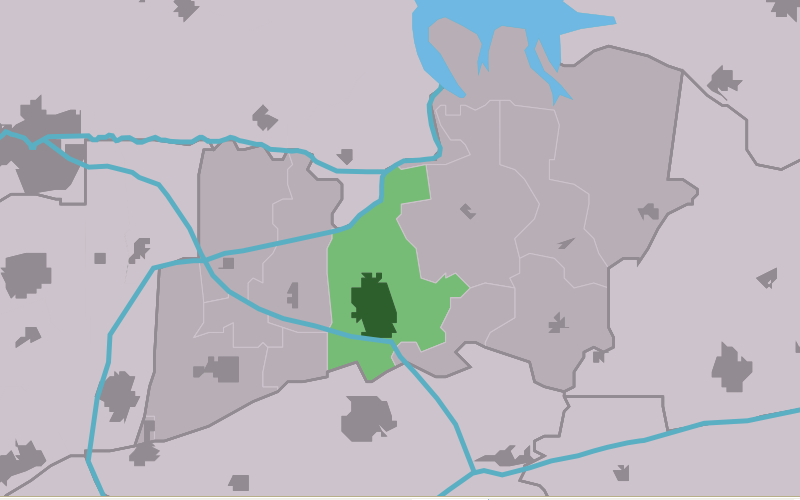
- Location in the former Kollumerland municipality

- Location in the Netherlands Kollum (Netherlands)
- Country: Netherlands
- Province: Friesland
- Municipality: Noardeast-Fryslân

Area
  - Total: 14.97 km^{2} (5.78 sq mi)
- Elevation: 0.2 m (0.66 ft)

Population (2021)
  - Total: 5,720
  - Density: 382/km^{2} (990/sq mi)
- Time zone: UTC+1 (CET)
  - Summer (DST): UTC+2 (CEST)
- Postal code: 9290 & 9291
- Dialing code: 0511

Kollum (Low Saxon: Kölm) is a village in Noardeast-Fryslân municipality in the province Friesland, the Netherlands. It had a population of around 5529 in January 2017. There is a restored windmill, Tochmaland in the village.

== History ==
The village was first mentioned between 822 and c. 825 as Colleheim, and means settlement of Kolle (person). Kollum originates from the early middle ages. During the 11th and 12th century, the peat was excavated in the region, and a settlement appeared on the Dwarsried, a former river leading to the Wadden Sea. During the 17th and 18th century, Kollum became a centre for trade and shipping.

The tower church of the Dutch Reformed dates from the 13th century and was enlarged during the 15th century. In 1661, it was hit by lightning, and a new spire constructed. The nave of the church dates from around 1100. The former courthouse dates from the 16th century. It was in service as courthouse between 1609 tot 1895. The former weigh house dates from 1614 and was extended in 1779. In 1895, it was turned into a residential home. The former town hall was built in 1808 as a residential home. In 1895, it became the town hall. In 2021, it was restored, and is currently used as a Grand Café, large pub.

In 1840, Kollum was home to 2,063 people. Before 2019, the village was part of the Kollumerland en Nieuwkruisland municipality.

=== Marianne Vaatstra murder ===
The village made national headlines after the murder of Marianne Vaatstra and subsequent riots which took place in the area in 1999. The case was only solved 13 years after the murder when the perpetrator was arrested after a DNA match.

== Gallery ==
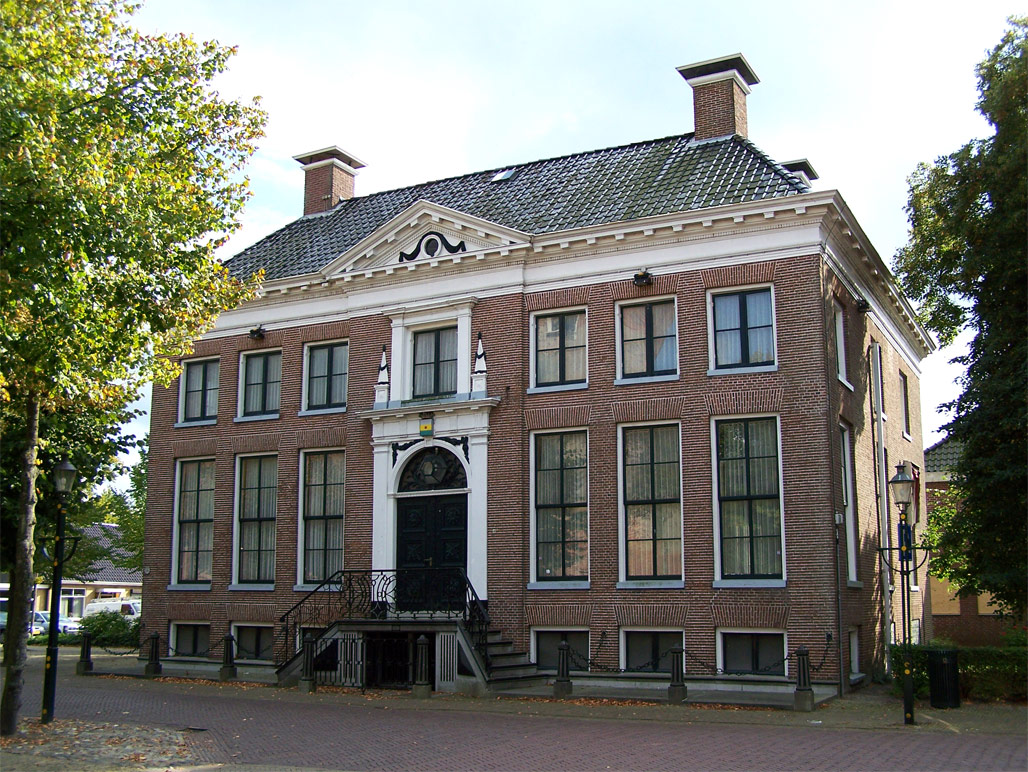
Former town hall (Kollum)

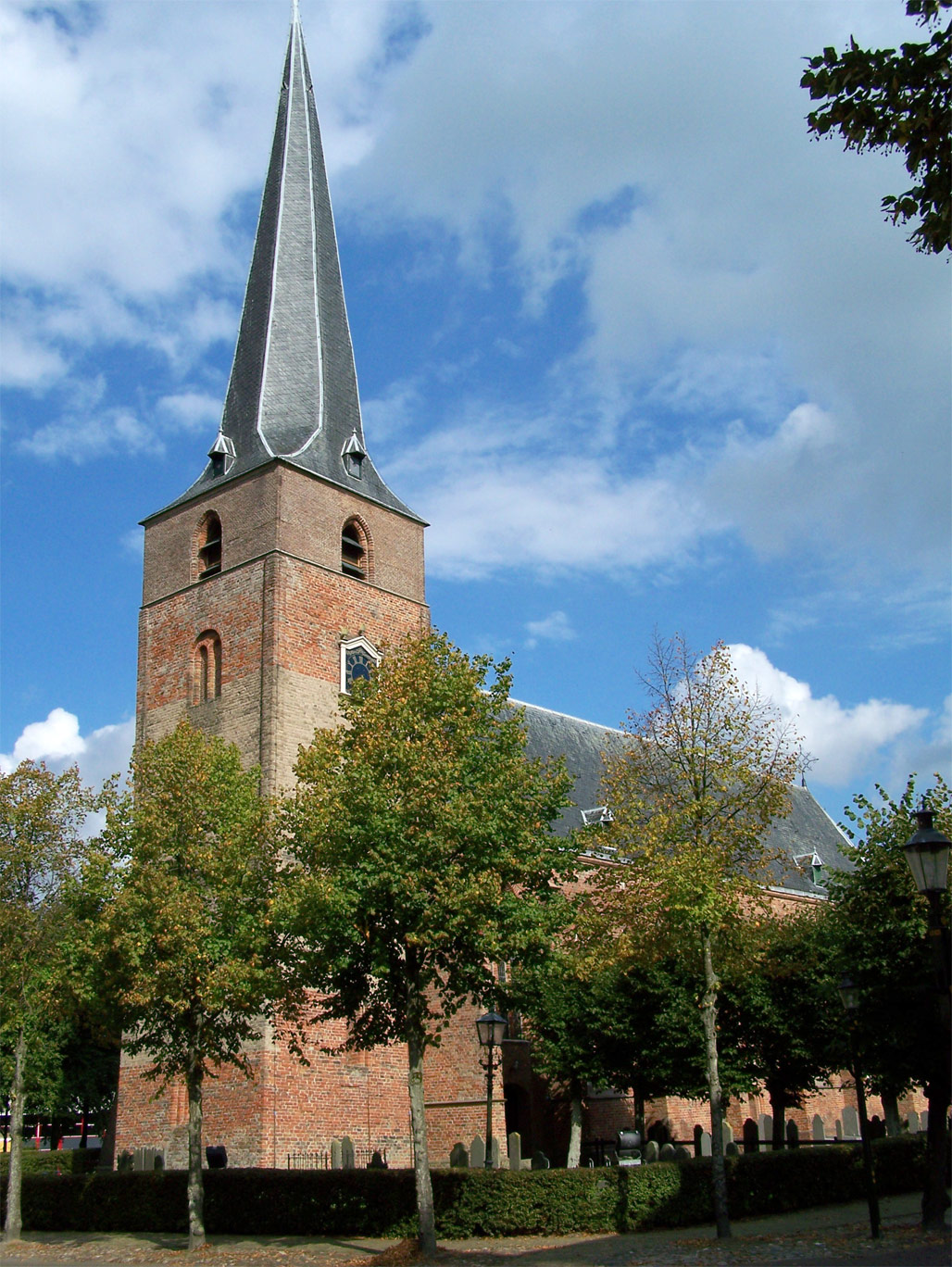
St Martin's church (Kollum)

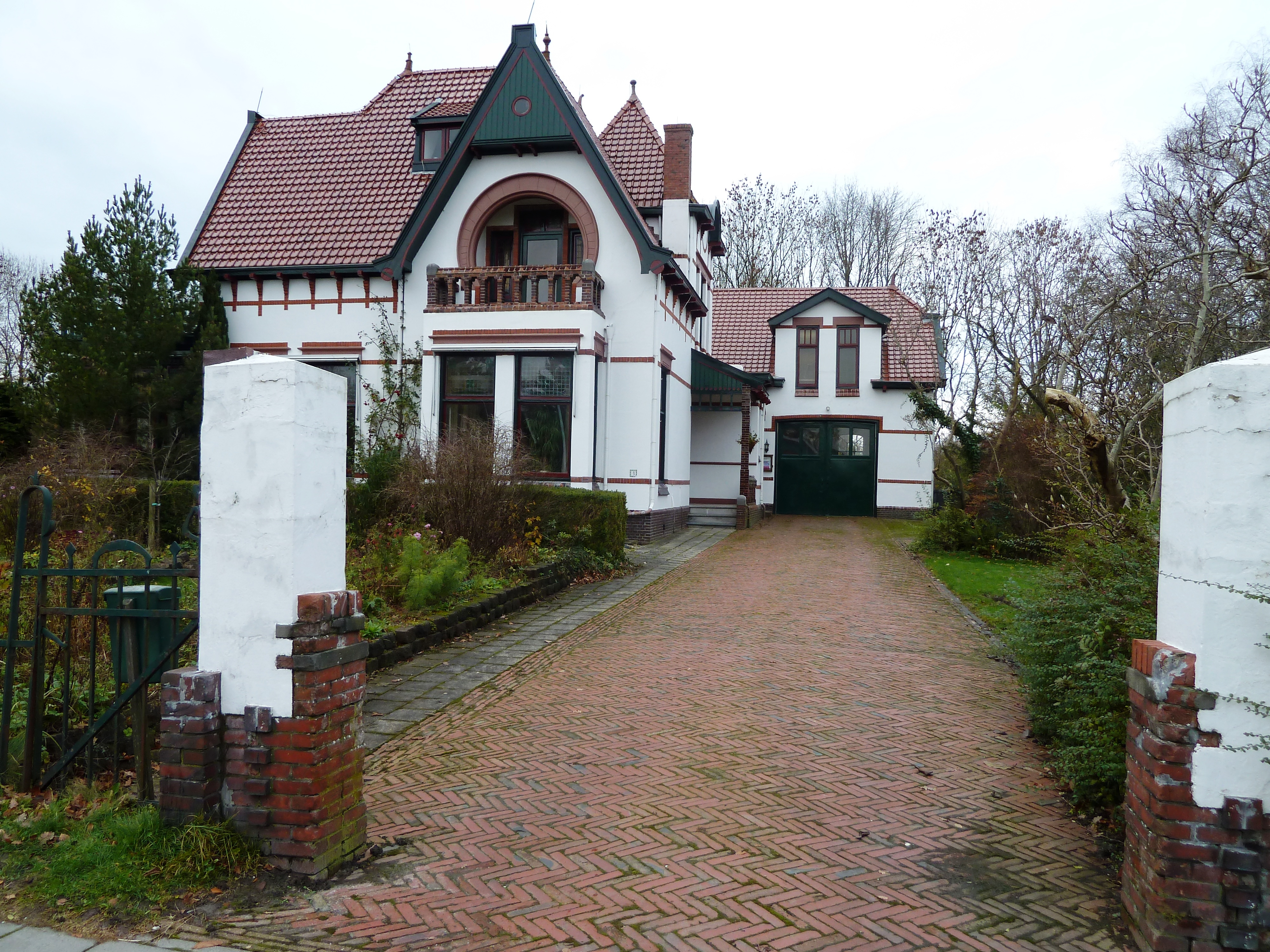
House (Kollum)

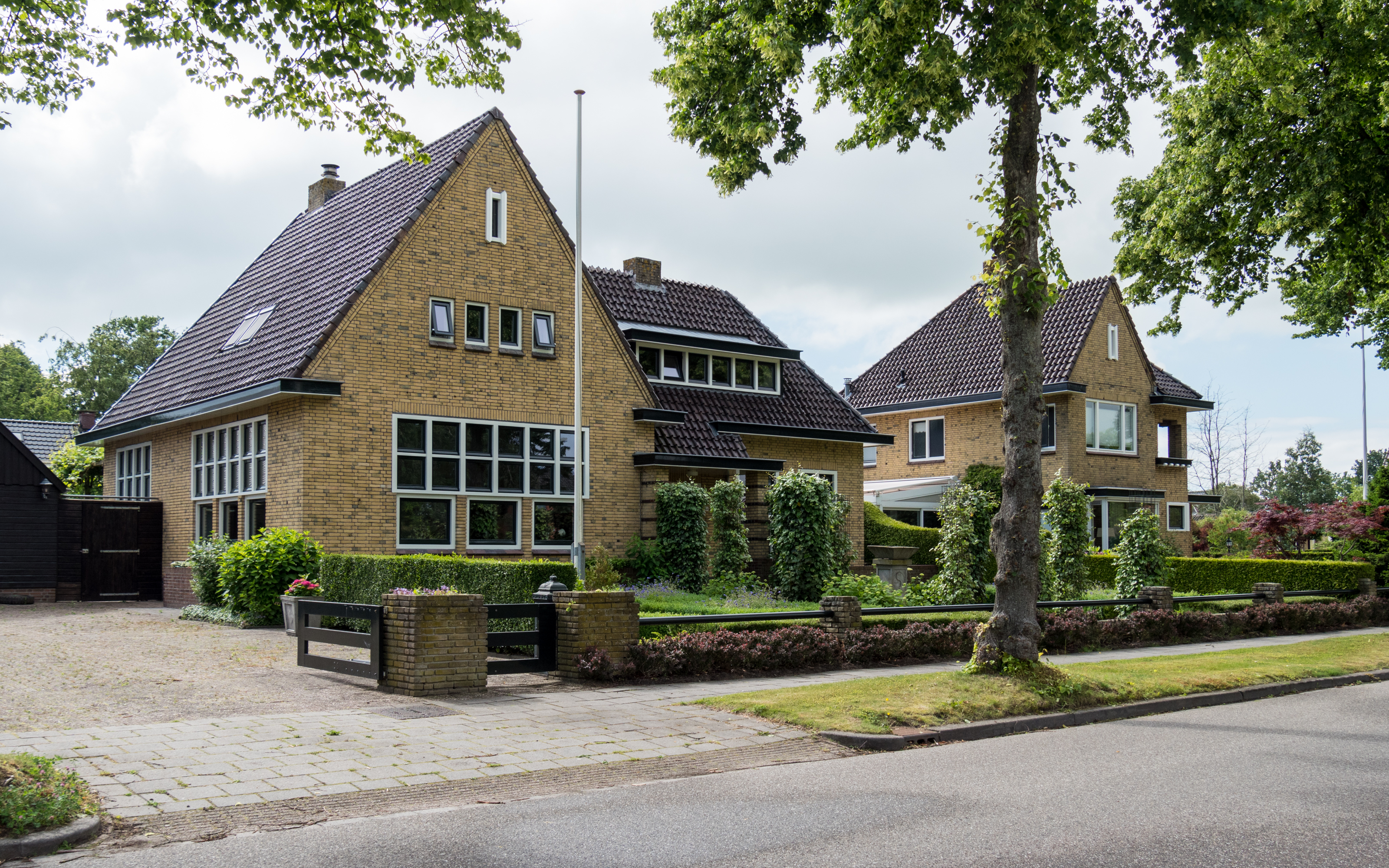
House (Kollum)

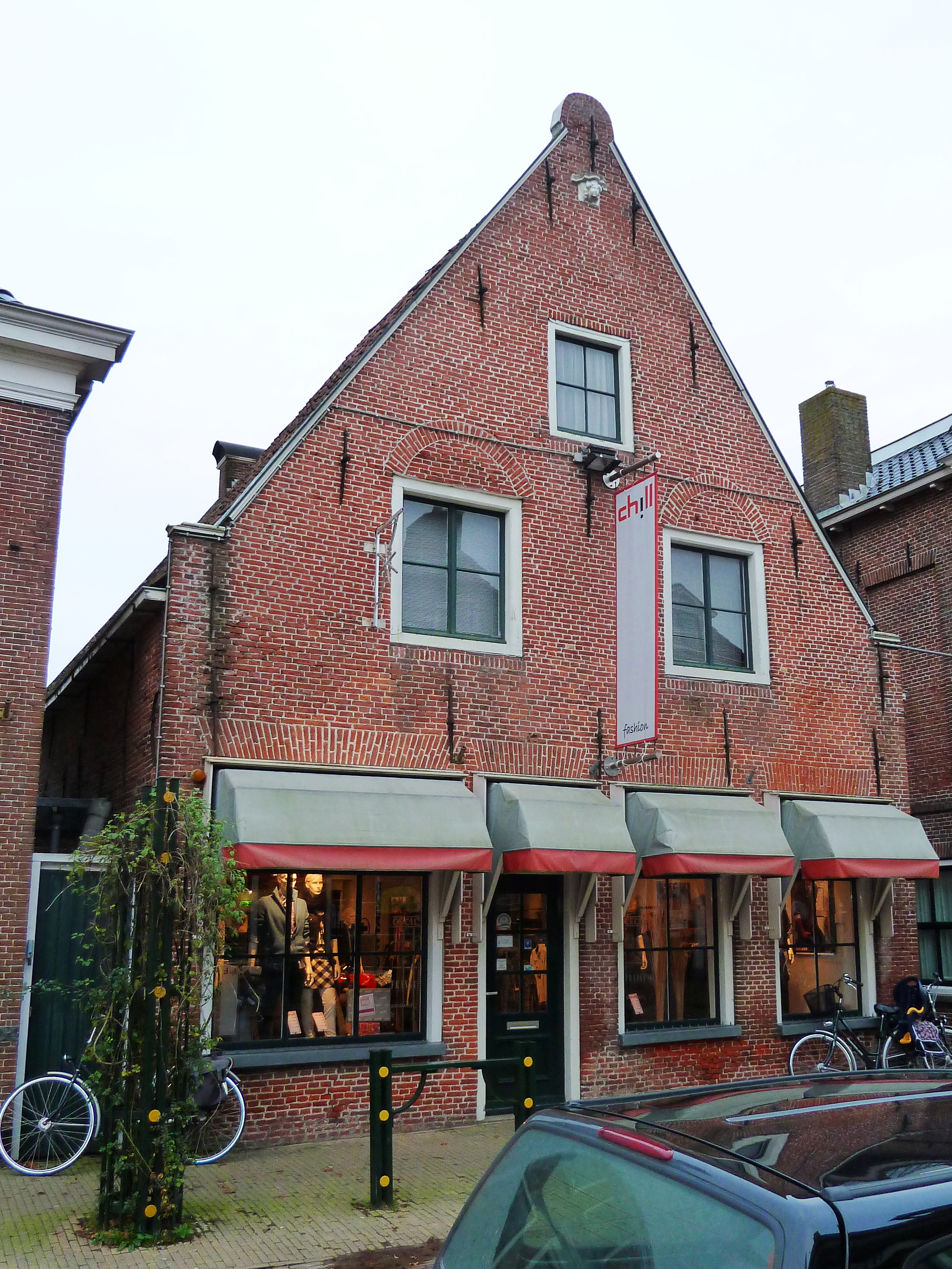
House (Kollum)
