= List of windmills in Friesland (W–Z) =

List of windmills in Friesland, Netherlands

A list of windmills in the Dutch province of Friesland, locations beginning W–Z.

== W ==
Location	Name of mill	Type	Built	Notes	Photograph
Waaxens	Arumer Miedenpolder; 53°06′48″N 5°31′41″E	Spinnenkopmolen	Before 1832	Demolished before 1929.	
Waaxens	Molen van Heere Wijnia; 53°06′54″N 5°32′33″E	Spinnenkopmolen	Before 1832	Demolished post-1850.	
Waaxens	Polder 13; Molen van Zathe Klein Lopens; 53°07′04″N 5°32′45″E	Spinnenkopmolen	Before 1600	Demolished before 1929.	
Waaxens	Polder 14; 53°06′56″N 5°32′14″E	Spinnenkopmolen	Before 1832	Demolished before 1929.	
Waaxens	Polder 15; 53°06′50″N 5°32′17″E		Before 1873	Demolished before 1928.	
Waaxens	Polder 432; 53°06′12″N 5°32′19″E	Spinnenkopmolen	Before 1832	Demolished before 1929.	
Waaxens	Polder 433; 53°06′33″N 5°31′50″E	Spinnenkopmolen	Before 1832	Demolished before 1929.	
Waaxens	Polder 434; 53°06′30″N 5°32′11″E	Spinnenkopmolen	Before 1832	Demolished before 1929.	
Waaxens	Polder 442; 53°06′47″N 5°32′58″E	Spinnenkopmolen	Before 1832	Demolished before 1929.	
Wâlterswâld	Molen van Klaas Sikkema; 53°18′56″N 6°01′17″E		Before 1832	Demolished before 1850.	
Wâlterswâld	53°16′18″N 6°01′22″E	Weidemolen	Before 1930		
Wâlterswâld	Polder; 53°16′23″N 6°01′32″E	Weidemolen	Before 1930		
Wâlterswâld	Tjasker van Evert de Jong; 53°16′23″N 6°01′42″E	Tjasker	Before 1930	Demolished 1938.	
Wâlterswâld	Tjasker van H. P. Smids; 53°16′22″N 6°01′42″E	Boktjasker	1875	Moved to Arnhem, Gelderland 1928.	
Wanswerd	Victor; 53°17′57″N 5°50′58″E	Grondzeiler	1867		
Wanswerd	Molen van de Pastrorij; 53°17′53″N 5°51′09″E	Spinnenkopmolen	Before 1832	Demolished post-1850.	
Wanswerd	Molen van de Tour van Bellichave; 53°18′18″N 5°50′39″E	Spinnenkopmolen	Before 1832	Demolished post-1850.	
Wanswerd	Molen van Hendrik Wierdsma; 53°17′58″N 5°51′08″E	Spinnenkopmolen	Before 1832	Demolished post-1850.	
Wanswerd	Molen van het St. Anthony Gasthuis; 53°17′35″N 5°52′01″E	Spinnenkopmolen	Before 1832	Demolished post-1850.	
Wanswerd	Molen van Kornelis de Vries; 53°18′01″N 5°49′32″E	Spinnenkopmolen	Before 1832	Demolished before 1850.	
Wanswerd	Molen van Petrus Scrinerus; 53°17′50″N 5°52′17″E	Spinnenkopmolen	Before 1832	Demolished post-1850.	
Wanswerd	Molen van Willem Albarda; 53°17′46″N 5°50′35″E	Spinnenkopmolen	Before 1832	Demolished before 1850.	
Wanswerd	Polder 2 Polder Oogvliet; 53°18′18″N 5°49′31″E		1846	Demolished post-1926.	
Wanswerd	53°17′53″N 5°51′12″E		Before 1830	Demolished before 1930.	
Wanswerd	Wanswerdermeer; 53°17′41″N 5°50′48″E	Grondzeiler	Before 1832	Demolished before 1928.	
Warfstermolen	Warfstermolen; 53°17′45″N 6°13′57″E	Standerdmolen	Before 1550	Demolished c.1715.	
Warns	Groote Warnser-en Zuiderpolder; Waterschap De Kei; Keimolen; 52°52′11″N 5°25′57″E	Grondzeiler	1850	Demolished between 1952 and 1956.	
Warns	Kampenspolder; 52°52′39″N 5°24′11″E	Grondzeiler	1864	Demolished post-1930.	
Warns	Korenmolen van Noordburen; 52°52′55″N 5°24′25″E	Standerdmolen	Before 1639	Demolished between 1718 and 1832.	
Warns	Molen van Cornelis de Jong; 52°53′14″N 5°24′40″E	Spinnenkopmolen	Before 1832	Demolished before 1850.	
Warns	Molen van Dirk Bouwsma; 52°52′17″N 5°24′24″E	Spinnenkopmolen	Before 1832	Demolished before 1850.	
Warns	Polder 20; 52°53′01″N 5°24′08″E	Grondzeiler	Before 1832	Demolished post-1952.	
Warns	Polder 20a 52°52′51″N 5°24′06″E	Tjasker	Before 1850	Demolished before 1930.	
Warns	Polder 21; 52°52′32″N 5°24′14″E	Grondzeiler[	Before 1832	Demolished before 1929.	
Warns	Polder 28; 52°52′04″N 5°25′38″E		Before 1832	Demolishged post-1850.	
Warns	Polder 29; 52°51′50″N 5°25′29″E		Before 1832	Demolished post-1850.	
Warns	Polder 30; 52°51′42″N 5°25′14″E	Spinnenkopmolen	Before 1832	Demolished post-1850.	
Warns	Polder 31; 52°51′34″N 5°25′13″E	Spinnenkopmolen	Before 1832	Demolished post-1850.	
Warns	52°51′55″N 5°24′21″E		1850	Demolished post-1908.	
Warns	Scheeuwen en Lange Akkers Polder; Noorderbuurster Polder; 52°53′10″N 5°24′40″E	Grondzeiler	Before 1832	Demolished post-1930.	
Warstiens	Molen van Eritia van Sminia; 53°09′35″N 5°51′54″E		Before 1832	Demolished before 1850.	
Warstiens	Polder 47; 53°10′08″N 5°51′04″E		Before 1832	Demolished before 1928.	
Warstiens	Polder 57; 53°09′33″N 5°51′47″E		Before 1832	Demolished post-1874.	
Warstiens	Polder 58; 53°09′43″N 5°51′43″E		Before 1832	Demolished post-1874.	
Warstiens	Polder 59; 53°09′55″N 5°51′26″E		Before 1832	Demolished post-1874.	
Warstiens	Polder 66; 53°09′43″N 5°52′50″E		Before 1832	Demolished post-1874.	
Warstiens	Polder 67; 53°10′07″N 5°53′17″E	Grondzeiler	Before 1832	Demolished before 1928.	
Warstiens	Polder 69; 53°09′21″N 5°52′04″E		Before 1832	Demolished between 1850 and 1874.	
Warstiens	Polder 69a Markrijtsje Mounle; 53°10′10″N 5°51′56″E	Spinnenkopmolen	1882	Demolished before 1924.	
Warten	Molen van de Kerk van Wartena; 53°09′04″N 5°54′16″E		Before 1832	Demolished post-1850.	
Warten	M0len van de School van Wartena; 53°08′41″N 5°53′45″E		Before 1832	Demolished before 1850.	
Warten	Molen van Eritia van Sminia; 53°09′26″N 5°52′29″E		BEfore 1832	Demolished before 1850.	
Warten	Molen van Eritia van Sminia; 53°09′10″N 5°52′30″E		Before 1832	Demolished post-1850.	
Warten	Molen van Gerrit Feenstra; 53°08′18″N 5°54′39″E		Before 1832	Demolished before 1850.	
Warten	Molen van Philip Vegelin van Claerbergen; 53°08′56″N 5°52′49″E		Before 1832	Demolished before 1850.	
Warten	Molen van Rientje de Wal; 53°07′28″N 5°53′21″E		Before 1832	Demolished before 1850.	
Warten	Molen van Sijbrand van Haersma; 53°08′53″N 5°53′50″E		Before 1832	Demolished before 1850.	
Warten	Molen van Sjoerd Rengnerus; 53°08′56″N 5°53′15″E		Before 1832	Demolished before 1850.	
Warten					
Warten	Polder 64; 53°09′14″N 5°52′26″E	Spinnenkopmolen	Before 1876	Demolished post-1928.	
Warten	Polder 65; 53°08′59″N 5°52′24″E		Before 1832	Demolished post-1876.	
Warten	Polder 66; 53°08′58″N 5°52′40″E		Before 1834	Demolished before 1876.	
Warten	Polder 66a 53°08′32″N 5°52′53″E		1832	Demolished befofre 1876.	
Warten	Polder 67; 53°09′10″N 5°52′56″E		Before 1832	Demolished post-1930.	
Warten	Polder 68; 53°10′01″N 5°53′30″E		Before 1832	Demolished post-1925.	
Warten	Polder 68; 53°09′25″N 5°53′08″E		1832	Demolished before 1925.	
Warten	Polder 69; 53°09′06″N 5°53′16″E		Before 1832	Demolished post-1928.	
Warten	Polder 70; 53°09′07″N 5°53′17″E		Before 1832	Demolished between 1876 and 1928.	
Warten	Polder 71; 53°09′01″N 0°35′18″E		Before 1832	Demolished post-1876.	
Warten	Polder 72; Molen van Tilma; 53°08′54″N 5°53′34″E	Spinnenkopmolen	Before 1832	Demolished between 1910 and 1928.	
Warten	Polder 73; 53°08′50″N 5°53′40″E		Before 1832	Demolished post-1873.	
Warten	Polder 74; 53°08′55″N 5°54′10″E		Before 1832	Demolished post-1876.	
Warten	Polder 75; 53°09′14″N 5°53′40″E		Before 1850	Demolished post-1930.	
Warten	Polder 76; 53°09′13″N 5°53′42″E		Before 1832	Demolished post-1876.	
Warten	Polder 76a 53°09′05″N 5°53′47″E				
Warten	Polder 77; 53°09′07″N 5°53′59″E		Before 1832	Demolished post-1876.	
Warten	Polder 78; 53°09′12″N 5°54′09″E		Before 1832	Demolished post-1876.	
Warten	Polder 79; 53°08′56″N 5°54′16″E		Before 1876	Demolished post-1925.	
Warten	Polder 80; Polder van der Wal; 53°08′22″N 5°54′05″E	Spinnenkopmolen	Between 1850 and 1876	Demolished 1952.	
Warten	Polder 80a 53°08′15″N 5°53′57″E		Before 1850	Demolished before 1876.	
Warten	Polder 80b 53°08′11″N 5°54′12″E		Before 1832	Demolished post-1850.	
Warten	Polder 81; Lytse Saiterpoldermolen; 53°08′17″N 5°54′40″E	Spinnenkopmolen	1756	Demolished 1950s, base remains.	
Warten	De Ikkers; 53°08′17″N 5°54′40″E	Spinnenkop	1970		
Warten	Polder 82; 53°08′06″N 5°53′29″E		Between 1832 and 1876	Demolished before 1925.	
Warten	Polder 83; 53°07′48″N 5°53′14″E		Before 1876	Demolished before 1925.	
Warten	Polder 84; 53°07′28″N 5°52′50″E		Before 1832	Demolished post-1876.	
Warten	Polder 85; 53°07′20″N 5°59′17″E		Before 1832	Demolished post-1876.	
Warten	Polder 86; 53°07′24″N 5°53′09″E	Spinnenkopmolen	Before 1876	Demolished post-1926.	
Warten	Polder 87; 53°07′34″N 5°53′48″E		Before 1876	Demolished post-1925.	
Warten	Polder 88; 53°07′27″N 5°54′13″E		Before 1876	Demolished before 1925.	
Warten	Polder 115; 53°07′31″N 5°51′35″E		Before 1876	Demolished before 1924.	
Warten	Polder 116; 53°07′37″N 5°51′28″E		Before 1832	Demolished post-1850.	
Warten	Polder 118; 53°07′18″N 5°52′20″E		Before 1832	Demolished post-1876.	
Warten	Polder 119; 53°07′25″N 5°52′20″E		Before 1832	Demolished post-1876.	
Warten	Polder 120; 53°07′37″N 5°52′28″E		Before 1832	Demolished post-1850.	
Warten	Polder 121; 53°07′51″N 5°52′49″E		Before 1832	Demolished post-1876.	
Warten	Polder 121a 53°07′49″N 5°52′31″E		Before 1832	Demolished post-1876.	
Warten	Polder 122; 53°07′57″N 5°52′30″E		Before 1832	Demolished post-1876.	
Warten	Polder 123; 53°08′22″N 5°52′49″E		Between 1832 and 1850	Demolished before 1928.	
Warten	Polder 123a 53°08′07″N 5°52′44″E		Before 1832	Demolished post-1876.	
Warten	Polder 125; 53°08′30″N 5°52′17″E		Before 1876	Demolished before 1925.	
Warten	Polder 125a 53°08′26″N 5°52′13″E		Before 1832		
Waskemeer	53°02′26″N 6°16′09″E	Weidemolen	Before 1864.		
Waskemeer	53°02′47″N 6°16′15″E	Weidemolen	Before 1850	Demolished post-1864.	
Waskemeer	Molen van Jan Hendriks Dijks; 53°03′20″N 6°17′06″E	Spinnenkopmolen	1759	Demolisged post-1765.	
Waskemeer	Molen van Jannes Alberts; 53°03′20″N 6°17′06″E	Spinnenkopmolen	1759	Demolished post-1765.	
Waskemeer	53°03′39″N 6°17′19″E	Weidemolen	Before 1926		
Waskemeer	53°03′17″N 6°17′06″E	Weidemolen	Before 1926	Demolished before 1948.	
Waskemeer	53°03′13″N 6°16′53″E	Weidemolen	Before 1926		
Waskemeer	53°03′09″N 6°16′52″E	Weidemolen	Before 1926		
Weidum	Waterschap de Oosterwierumer Oudvaart; Wiedumermolen; Windmotor Weidum; 53°08′54″N 5°45′12″E	Iron windpump	1920		
Weidum	Borniamoune; 53°08′38″N 5°44′20″E	Iron windpump	1930		]
Weidum	Molen van IJge Tempel; 53°09′04″N 5°45′05″E		Before 1832	Demolished post-1850.	
Weidum	Polder 116; 53°09′09″N 5°45′25″E		Before 1832	Demolished before 1929.	
Weidum	Polder 119; 53°08′46″N 5°45′43″E		1850	Demolished before 1929.	
Weidum	Polder 120; 53°08′31″N 5°45′12″E		Before 1832	Demolished before 1929.	
Weidum	Polder 121; 53°08′22″N 5°45′04″E		Before 1832	Demolished before 1929.	
Weidum	Polder 122; 53°08′18″N 5°45′05″E		Before 1832	Demolished before 1929.	
Weidum	Polder 123; 53°08′04″N 5°44′30″E		Before 1832	Demolished before 1929.	
Weidum	Polder Hege Wier; 53°09′07″N 5°44′10″E		Before 1932	Demolished before 1949.	
Weidum	Wielsterpolder; 53°09′16″N 5°45′01″E		Before 1832	Demolished c.1929.	
Wergea	Hempensermeerpolder; 53°10′03″N 5°50′28″E		1784	Demolished 1863.	
Wergea	De Hempenserpoldermolen; 53°10′03″N 5°50′28″E	Grondzeiler	1863	Molendatabase (in Dutch)	
Wergea	Paaltjasker; 53°09′21″N 5°51′01″E	Tjasker	1997		
Wergea	De Snelheid; 53°08′55″N 5°50′42″E	Stellingmolen	1868	Demolished 1898.	
Wergea	Het Fortuin; 53°09′10″N 5°50′33″E	Spinnenkop stellingmolen	1823	Burnt down 1876/77.	
Wergea	Molen van Bernhardus Reiger; 53°08′09″N 5°50′45″E		Before 1832	Demolished before 1850.	
Wergea	Molen van Hoogterp; 53°08′58″N 5°50′41″E	Stellingmolen	1853/54	Demolished 1918.	
Wergea	Molen van Reinhart de Schiffard; 53°09′20″N 5°51′16″E		Before 1832	Demolished before 1850.	
Wergea	Molen van W. A. van Sloterdijk; 53°09′03″N 5°51′11″E		Before 1832	Demolished before 1850.	
Wergea	Moln van W. A. van Sloterdijk; 53°09′19″N 5°50′44″E		Before 1832	Demolished before 1850.	
Wergea	Molen van W. A. van Sloterdijk; 53°09′08″N 5°51′16″E		Before 1832	Demolished before 1850.	
Wergea	Nieuwe Hoek; Molen van Hoekstr-Kooistra; 53°09′11″N 5°50′33″E	Stellingmolen	1829	Demolished 1917.	
Wergea	Polder 42; 53°07′55″N 5°50′14″E		Before 1832	Demolished before 1929.	
Wergea	Polder 43; 53°07′57″N 5°50′30″E		Before 1832	Demolished before 1929.	
Wergea	Polder 44; 53°07′57″N 5°50′29″E		Before 1832	Demolished before 1929.	
Wergea	Polder 45; 53°08′25″N 5°50′49″E		Before 1832	Demolished before 1929.	
Wergea	Polder 46; 53°08′31″N 5°51′00″E		Before 1832	Demolished before 1929.	
Wergea	Polder 46a 53°08′15″N 5°51′13″E		1832	Demolished before 1929.	
Wergea	Polder 47; 53°08′31″N 5°51′10″E	Before 1832	Demolished before 1929.		
Wergea	Polder 48; 53°08′35″N 5°51′10″E		Before 1832	Demolished before 1929.	
Wergea	Polder 49; 53°08′36″N 5°50′47″E		Before 1832	Demolished before 1929.	
Wergea	Polder 52; 53°09′49″N 5°49′42″E	Spinnenkopmolen	Before 1832	Demolished post-1930.	
Wergea	Polder 52; It Spoekmûntsje; 53°09′04″N 5°49′59″E	Spinnenkopmolen	Before 1832	Demolished 1928.	
Wergea	Polder 53; 53°09′43″N 5°50′07″E		Before 1832	Demolished before 1929.	
Wergea	Polder 53a 53°09′19″N 5°00′00″E	Spinnenkopmolen	Before 1832	Demolished post-1930.	
Wergea	Polder 54; 53°09′44″N 5°50′14″E	Spinnenkopmolen	1790	Demolished c.1953.	
Wergea	Polder 55; 53°09′17″N 5°50′20″E	Spinnenkopmolen	Before 1832	Demolished post-1930.	
Wergea	Polder 56; 53°09′27″N 5°50′59″E		Before 1832	Demolished before 1928.	
Wergea	Polder 57; 53°09′05″N 5°50′58″E		Before 1832	Demolished before 1929.	
Wergea	Polder 58; 53°09′06″N 5°51′08″E		Before 1876	Demolished before 1925.	
Wergea	Polder 58a 53°08′46″N 5°50′47″E		Before 1832	Demolished before 1929.	
Wergea	Polder 59; 53°08′53″N 5°51′25″E		Before 1832	Demolished before 1929.	
Wergea	Polder 60; 53°08′41″N 5°51′45″E		Before 1832	Demolished before 1929.	
Wergea	Polder 61; 53°08′42″N 5°51′57″E		Before 1832	Demolished between 1850 and 1929.	
Wergea	Polder 62; 53°09′02″N 5°52′01″E		Before 1832	Demolished before 1829.	
Wergea	Polder 63; 53°09′24″N 5°51′49″E		Before 1832	Demolished before 1929.	
Wergea	Polder 124; 53°08′13″N 5°52′24″E		Before 1832	Demolished c.1850.	
Wergea	Polder 126; 53°07′22″N 5°51′11″E		Before 1832	Demolished post-1850.	
Wergea	Polder de Grote Wargaastermeer Bovenmolen; 53°08′24″N 5°50′37″E	Grondzeiler	1632	Demolished 1915.	
Wergea	Polder de Grote Wargaastermeer Ondermolen; 53°08′21″N 5°50′31″E	Stellingmolen	1632	Demolished between 1745 and 1832.	
Wergea	Polder de Lytse Mar; Jornahuisterpolder; 53°09′07″N 5°51′56″E	Grondzeiler	1840	Demolished 1924.	
Wergea	Polder de Lytse Mar; Jornahuisterpolder Bovenmolen; 53°09′07″N 5°51′56″E	Spinnenkopmolen	1633	Demolished c.1740.	
Wergea	Polder de Lytse Mar; Jornahuisterpolder Ondermolen; 53°09′06″N 5°51′54″E	Spinnenkopmolen	1633	Demolished before 1832.	
Wergea	Polder W 53°08′53″N 5°50′42″E		Before 1850	Demolished before 1928.	
Wergea	Polder W 53°08′51″N 5°50′32″E		1850	Demolished post-1930.	
Westergeast	De Beintemapoldermolen; 53°19′00″N 6°04′56″E	Grondzeiler	1870		
Westergeast	Beintemapolder; 53°19′14″N 6°05′28″E	Grondzeiler	Before 1832	Burnt down 1869.	
Westergeast	Korenmolen van Westergeest; 53°17′20″N 6°05′12″E	Standerdmolen	Before 1664	Demolished 1714/15.	
Westergeast	Molen van Jouert Buwalda; 53°18′10″N 6°04′35″E		Before 1832	Demolished before 1850.	
Westergeast	Polder 57; 53°18′17″N 6°04′46″E		Before 1854	Demolished before 1927.	
Westergeast	Polder Beintema-oost; 53°19′14″N 6°05′28″E	Grondzeiler	1863	Demolished c.1953.	
Westergeast	Polder Werteburen; Polder Weerdeburen; 53°19′13″N 6°05′33″E	Grondzeiler	1869	Demolished 1939.	
Westhem	Polder 15; 53°01′18″N 5°33′04″E	Spinnenkopmolen	Before 1832	Demolished before 1929.	
Westhem	Polder 16; 53°01′15″N 5°32′39″E	Spinnenkopmolen	Before 1832	Demolished before 1929.	
Westhem	Polder 17; 53°00′39″N 5°32′32″E	Spinnenkopmolen	Before 1832	Demolished post-1930.	
Westhem	Polder 18a 53°00′44″N 5°31′37″E		Between 1832 and 1850	Demolished before 1929.	
Westhem	Polder 35; 53°00′37″N 5°33′23″E		Before 1832	Demolished before 1929.	
Westhem	Polder 36; 53°00′47″N 5°32′57″E	Spinnenkopmolen	Before 1832	Demolished post-1930.	
Westhem	Polder 37; 53°00′41″N 5°33′38″E	Spinnenkopmolen	Before 1832	Demolished before 1929.	
Westhem	Polder64; 53°01′07″N 5°33′09″E	Spinnenkopmolen	Before 1832	Demolished before 1929.	
West-Terschelling	Molen op de Dellewal; 53°21′59″N 5°13′55″E	Stellingmolen	1838	Moved to Formerum 1876.	
West-Terschelling	Westersemolen; 53°21′36″N 5°13′03″E	Standerdmolen	1612	Moved within West-Terschelling 1723.	
West-Terschelling	Westersemolen; 53°21′43″N 5°12′43″E	Standerdmolen	1723	Burnt down 1841.	
Wijckel	Zandpoel; Sânpoel; 52°52′27″N 5°37′29″E	Paaltjasker	1975		
Wijckel	Bonne Brecken; 52°52′55″N 5°38′12″E	Boktjasker	1976	Blown down 2001, subsequently moved to Nijetrijne.	
Wijckel	Bonnebrecken; 52°52′44″N 5°38′26″E		Before 1873	Demolished before 1930.	
Wijckel	Coehoornspolder; 52°53′40″N 5°37′31″E		Before 1718	Demolished before 1832.	
Wijckel	Coehoornspolder; 52°53′57″N 5°37′20″E	Spinnenkopmolen	Before 1832	Demolished before 1939.	
Wijckel	Hadenerpolder; Wikelerpolder; Wijckelerpolder; 52.°N 5.°E	Grondzeiler	Before 1832	Demolished 1957.	
Wijckel	Polder 32a 52°53′42″N 5°36′48″E	Spinnenkopmolen	Before 1832	Demolished post-1930.	
Wijckel	Polder 34; Jan Obbes-polder; 52°51′57″N 5°38′29″E	Spinnenkopmolen	Before 1854	Demolished before 1930.	
Wijckel	Molen van Jan de Jong; 52°51′52″N 5°38′27″E	Spinnenkopmolen	Before 1832	Demolished before 1854.	
Wijckel	Wijkelerpolder; Graverijpolder; Geldersmapolder; Gerlsmapolder; 52°52′32″N 5°38′16″E	Grondzeiler	Before 1832	Demolished before 1929.	
Wijnaldum	Molen van E. J. R. van Grotenhuis tot Onstein; 53°11′51″N 5°28′05″E	Spinnenkopmolen	Before 1625	Demolished between 1850 and 1873.	
Wijnaldum	Polder 3 Koopmans Polder. 53°11′52″N 5°28′30″E	Spinnenkopmolen	Before 1832	Demolished 1903.	
Wijnaldum	Polder 4; 53°11′39″N 5°27′20″E	Spinnenkopmolen	Before 1832	Demolished before 1928.	
Wijnaldum	Riedpolder; 53°12′03″N 5°29′32″E	Spinnenkopmolen	Before 1625	Demolished 1802.	
Wijnaldum	Riedpolder; De Eendracht; 53°12′03″N 5°29′32″E	Grondzeiler	1802	Demolished 1951.	
Wijnjewoude	De Morgenster; 53°03′35″N 6°12′11″E		1861	Moved to Gorredijk 1882.	
Wijnjewoude	Korenmolen van Duurswoude; 53°03′34″N 6°12′12″E	Standerdmolen	Before 1582	Demolished 1821.	
Wijnjewoude	Polder 7; 53°02′59″N 6°12′52″E	Grondzeiler	Before 1875	Demolished before 1923.	
Wijnjewoude	Volmolen van Duurswoude; 53°03′39″N 6°12′34″E	Standerdmolen	Before 1659	Demolished between 1664 and 1693.	
Winsum	Langwert	Grondzeiler	1863	Burnt down 14 March 1974. De Hollandsche Molen (in Dutch)	
Winsum	Langwert; 53°08′47″N 5°38′20″E	Grondzeiler	1979		
Winsum	Molen van Helenius Speelman Wobma; 53°09′22″N 5°37′10″E		Before 1832	Demolished post-1850.	
Winsum	Molen vanj Helenius Speelman Wobma; 53°08′47″N 5°37′55″E		Before 1832	Demolished before 1850.	
Winsum	Molen van Tjilbert; 53°09′12″N 5°36′41″E	Grondzeiler	1894	Moved within Winsum 1975.	
Winsum	Polder 57; 53°08′42″N 5°37′22″E	Grondzeiler	Between 1832 and 1850	Demolished post-1929.	
Winsum	Polder 58; Molen van Faber; Westermolen; 53°09′03″N 5°37′09″E	Grondzeiler	Before 1832	Moved to Uitgeest 1975.	
Winsum	Polder 58a 53°09′14″N 5°37′13″E	Grondzeiler	Before 1873	Demolished before 1929.	
Winsum	Polder 92; Molen van Van der Meer; Zuidoostermoloen; 53°08′47″N 5°38′20″E	Grondzeiler	1829/30	Burnt down 1974.	
Winsum	Polder 93; 53°09′05″N 5°37′33″E		Between 1832 and 1850	Demolished c.1930.	
Winsum	Polder 94; 53°09′30″N 5°37′17″E	Grondzeiler	1850	Demolished 1952.	
Winsum	Polder 95; 53°09′13″N 5°38′41″E	Grondzeiler	Before 1832	Demolished before 1929.	
Winsum	Polder Heeringa; 53°08′59″N 5°37′43″E		Before 1932	Demolished befofe 1949.	
Winsum	53°08′59″N 5°37′27″E		Before 1844	Demolished between 1867 and 1873.	
Winsum	53°08′31″N 5°38′04″E	Tjasker		Demolished 1925.	
Wirdum	Kramers Molen; Old Barrahûs	Spinnenkop	18th century	Moved to Zwette, 1995.	
Wirdum	Molen Hoogland	Spinnenkop	18th century	Moved to Zwette, 1995.	
Wirdum	Windmotor Wirdum; 53°09′10″N 5°48′37″E	Iron windpump	1939		
Wirdum	Molen van Andries Andringa; 53°08′54″N 5°48′25″E	Spinnenkopmolen	Before 1832	Demolished post-1850.	
Wirdum	Molen van Bernardus Reiger; 53°08′32″N 5°48′09″E		Before 1832	Demolished before 1850.	
Wirdum	Molen van de Kerk van Wirdum; 53°08′50″N 5°48′44″E	Spinnenkopmolen	Before 1832	Demolished post-1850.	
Wirdum	Molen van de Pastoreij van Swigchem; 53°08′58″N 5°48′43″E	Spinnenkopmolen	Before 1832	Demolished post-1850.	
Wirdum	Molen van Marten van der Hem; 53°07′43″N 5°47′47″E	Spinnenkopmolen	Before 1832		
Wirdum	Polder 1; 53°08′56″N 5°47′33″E	Spinnenkopmolen	Between 1832 and 1850	Demolished post-1930.	
Wirdum	Polder 2; 53°09′14″N 5°48′16″E	Spinnenkopmolen	Between 1832 and 1850	Demolished post-1930.	
Wirdum	Polder 3; 53°09′07″N 5°48′31″E	Spinnenkopmolen	Before 1832	Demolished post-1930.	
Wirdum	De Blaumone; 53°08′52″N 5°48′39″E	Spinnenkopmolen	Before 1832	Demolished 1941, base demolished c.1980.	
Wirdum	Polder 11; 53°08′35″N 5°49′10″E		Between 1832 and 1850	Demolished before 1929.	
Wirdum	Polder 12; 53°08′06″N 5°49′01″E	Spinnenkopmolen	Before 1832	Demolished before 1932.	
Wirdum	Polder 13; 53°08′06″N 5°48′55″E	Spinnenkopmolen	Before 183	Demolished before 1929.	
Wirdum	Polder 14; 53°07′52″N 5°48′53″E		Before 1832	Demolished before 1929.	
Wirdum	Polder 15; 53°08′40″N 5°47′56″E	Spinnenkopmolen	Before 1832	Demolished post-1850.	
Wirdum	Polder 15a Tjaarder Molen; 53°08′28″N 5°48′05″E	Spinnenkopmolen	Between 1832 and 1850	Demolished post-1930.	
Wirdum	Polder 16; 53°00′00″N 5°48′09″E	Spinnenkopmolen	Before 1832	Demolished before 1929.	
Wirdum	Polder 17; 53°07′57″N 5°48′06″E		Before 1832	Demolished before 1929.	
Wirdum	Polder 18; 53°07′47″N 5°47′52″E	Spinnenkopmolen	Before 1832	Demolished before 1929.	
Wirdum	Polder 19; 53°07′38″N 5°47′47″E	Spinnenkopmolen	Before 1832	Demolished between 1943 and 1952.	
Wirdum	Polder 19a 53°07′38″N 5°47′40″E	Spinnenkopmolen	Before 1832	Demolished post-1850.	
Wirdum	Polder 20; 53°07′43″N 5°47′47″E	Spinnenkopmolen		Demolished between 1943 and 1952.	
Wirdum	Polder 21; 53°07′54″N 5°47′48″E	Spinnenkopmolen	Before 132	Demolished between 1943 and 1952.	
Wirdum	Polder 22; 53°07′47″N 5°47′11″E	Spinnenkopmolen	Between 1832 and 1850	Demolished between 1943 and 1952.	
Wirdum	Polder 23; 53°08′07″N 5°47′26″E	Grondzeiler	1800	Demolished c.1951.	
Wirdum	Polder 24; 53°08′20″N 5°47′39″E	Spinnenkopmolen	Before 1832	Demolished 1952/53.	
Wirdum	Polder 25; 53°08′29″N 5°47′47″E	Grondzeiler	Before 1832	Demolished post-1930.	
Wirdum	Polder 26; 53°08′34″N 5°47′42″E	Spinnenkopmolen	Before 1832	Demolished post-1943.	
Wirdum	Polder 117; 53°08′43″N 5°46′34″E	Spinnenkopmolen	Before 1832	Demolished between 1929 and 1952.	
Wirdum	Polder 118; 53°08′36″N 5°46′46″E	Grondzeiler	Between 1832 and 1850	Demolished between 1929 and 1950.	
Wirdum	Wirdumer Korenmolen; 53°08′27″N 5°47′02″E	Standerdmolen	Before 1399	Destroyed 1515.	
Wirdum	Wirdumer Korenmolen; 53°08′27″N 5°47′02″E	Standerdmolen	Before 1580	Demolished c. 1750	
Witmarsum	De Onderneming; 53°05′57″N 5°28′07″E	Stellingmolen	1850		
Witmarsum	De Pannekoekstermolen; De Pankoekstermolen; 53°06′06″N 5°30′43″E	Grondzeiler	1817	Burnt down 1899.	
Witmarsum	De Pannekoekstermolen; De Pankoekstermolen; 53°06′06″N 5°30′43″E	Grondzeiler	1900		
Witmarsum	Oosterhemmerpolder; De Vooruitang; 53°05′51″N 5°28′16″E	Grondzeiler	1870	Demolished 1955.	
Witmarsum	Korenmolen van Witmarsum; 53°05′57″N 5°28′07″E	Standerdmolen	Before 1664	Demolished before 1718.	
Witmarsum	Molen van IJzebrand Haagsma; 53°06′43″N 5°28′45″E	Spinnenkopmolen	Before 1832	Demolished before 1850.	
Witmarsum	Polder 12; 53°05′45″N 5°28′44″E	Spinnenkopmolen	Before 1832	Demolished post-1850.	
Witmarsum	Polder Filens; Waterschap Thiem; Molen Groot Thiem; 53°05′12″N 5°27′59″E	Spinnenkopmolen	1830	Demolishe d1949.	
Witmarsum	Polder Witmarsum; Ypmapolder; 53°06′20″N 5°27′30″E	Grondzeiler	Before 1832	Burnt down 1870.	
Witmarsum	Polder Witmarsum; Ypmapolder; 53°06′20″N 5°27′30″E	Grondzeiler	1870	Demolished between 1938 and 1941.	
Wiuwert	Koorenmolen van Wieuwerd; 53°06′43″N 5°41′33″E	Standerdmolen	Between 1664 and 1718	Demolished between 1739 and 1864.	
Wiuwert	Molen van Theo Looxma; 53°05′59″N 5°43′16″E		Before 1832	Demolished post-1850.	
Wiuwert	Molen van Willem Albarda; 53°06′10″N 5°41′47″E		Before 1832	Demolished before 1850.	
Wiuwert	Polder 102; 53°07′07″N 5°41′11″E		Before 1832	Demolished before 1929.	
Wiuwert	Polder 103; 53°06′56″N 5°42′02″E		Before 1832	Demolished before 1928.	
Wiuwert	Polder 227; 53°06′37″N 5°42′33″E		Between 1832 and 1850	Demolished before 1929.	
Wiuwert	Polder 228; 53°06′37″N 5°42′28″E		Before 1873	Demolished before 1929.	
Wiuwert	Polder 229; 53°06′34″N 5°42′17″E		Between 1832 and 1850	Demolished before 1929.	
Wiuwert	Polder 230; 53°06′09″N 5°42′26″E		Before 1832	Demoplished post-1850.	
Wiuwert	Polder 235; 53°06′26″N 5°41′18″E		Before 1832	Demolished before 1929.	
Wiuwert	Polder 238; 53°06′09″N 5°42′43″E		Before 1832	Demolished post-1850.	
Wiuwert	53°06′50″N 5°42′14″E		Before 1832	Demolished post-1850.	
Wjelsryp	Molen van Antje Speerstra; 53°10′04″N 5°36′14″E		Before 1832	Demolished before 1850.	
Wjelsryp	Molen van Jan Miedema; 53°09′47″N 5°36′12″E		Before 1832	Demolished before 1850.	
Wjelsryp	Polder 43; 53°10′04″N 5°36′00″E		Before 1850	Demolished before 1928.	
Wjelsryp	Polder 44; 53°10′33″N 5°35′19″E		Before 1832	Demolished post-1850.	
Wjelsryp	Polder 49; 53°10′01″N 5°36′41″E		Before 1873	Demolished before 1928.	
Wjelsryp	Polder 50; 53°10′08″N 5°37′33″E		Before 1873	Demolished before 1929.	
Wjelsryp	Polder Tjepperbuurt; Tsjeppenbur; 53°10′15″N 5°36′25″E	Grondzeiler	1808	Demolished 1954.	
Wolsum	Molen van Pieter Oppenhuizen; 53°02′05″N 5°33′05″E	Spinnenkopmolen	Before 1832	Demolished before 1850.	
Wolsum	Polder 5; 53°02′28″N 5°31′54″E	Spinnenkopmolen	Before 1832	Demolished before 1929.	
Wolsum	Polder 9; 53°02′23″N 5°32′45″E	Spinnenkopmolen	Before 1832	Demolished before 1929.	
Wolsum	Polder 10; 53°02′13″N 5°32′31″E	Spinnenkopmolen	Before 1832	Demolished post-1850.	
Wolsum	Polder 10a 53°02′26″N 5°32′03″E	Spinnenkopmolen	Before 1832	Demolished before 1929.	
Wolsum	Polder 12; 53°01′57″N 5°32′05″E	Spinnenkopmolen	Before 1832	Demolished before 1930.	
Wolsum	Polder 13; 53°01′45″N 5°32′34″E		Before 1832	Demolished before 1929.	
Wolsum	Polder 14; 53°01′51″N 5°32′58″E		Before 1873	Demolished before 1928.	
Wolsum	Polder Jouwswerd; 53°01′52″N 5°32′38″E	Spinnenkopmolen	Before 1832	Demolished before 1929.	
Wolvega	De Gooyer; 52°51′22″N 6°01′10″E	Grondzeiler	1916		
Wolvega	Windlust; 52°52′26″N 6°59′38″E	Stellingmolen	1888		
Wolvega	Oliemolen Schipssloot; Bonkemolen; 52°52′54″N 6°59′32″E	Stellingmolen	1870	Demolished 1950.	
Wolvega	Polder 129; 52°51′35″N 6°00′11″E	Spinnenkopmolen	Before 1877	Demolished post-1926.	
Wolvega	Polder 130; 52°51′50″N 6°01′24″E	Tjasker	Before 1887	Demolished post-1929.	
Wolvega	Polder 132; Driessenpolder; 52°51′22″N 6°01′10″E	Spinnenkopmolen	Before 1832	Burnt down 1917.	
Wolvega	Polder 133; Gorterspolder; 52°51′06″N 6°00′09″E	Spinnenkopmolen	Before 1832	Demolished 1933.	
Wolvega	52°51′06″N 5°59′55″E		Before 1921	Demolished post-1926.	
Wolvega	De Nijverheid; 52°52′41″N 5°59′45″E	Stellingmolen	1868	Demolished 1919.	
Wolvega	Korenmolen van Wolvega; 52°52′23″N 5°59′16″E	Standerdmolen	Before 1750	Demolished c.1854.	
Wolvega	Molen van Hooijsma; 52°52′23″N 5°59′16″E	Stellingmolen	1855	Demolished 1888.	
Wolvega	Molen van Foppe Klijnsma; 52°51′17″N 6°00′59″E		Before 1832	Demolished post-1887.	
Wolvega	Molen van Oene van der Veen; 52°51′09″N 6°00′25″E	Spinnenkopmolen	Before 1832	Burnt down between 1859 and 1887.	
Wolvega	Polder 128; Jan de Bouer's Meulentien; 52°51′45″N 6°00′33″E	Spinnenkopmolen	Before 1864	Burnt down 1867.	
Wolvega	Polder 131; Keetman's Meuleniten; 52°51′44″N 6°01′18″E	Spinnenkopmolen	1887	Demolished c.1950.	
Wommels	De Verandering		1863	Burnt down 1881.	
Wommels	Korenmolen van Wommels; 53°06′29″N 5°35′09″E	Standerdmolen	Before 1639	Demolished post-1798.	
Wommels	Molen van Catharina de Vries; 53°05′03″N 5°33′59″E	Spinnenkopmolen	Before 1832	Demolished before 1850.	
Wommels	Molen van de Kerk van Wommels; 53.°N 5.°E	Spinnenkopmolen	Before 1832	Demolished c.1845.	
Wommels	Molen van Foeke Wijnia; 53°05′36″N 5°35′32″E	Spinnenkopmolen	Before 1832	Demolished before 1850.	
Wommels	Molen van Foekje Braak; 53°05′59″N 5°36′00″E		Before 1832	Demolished 1872.	
Wommels	Molen van Jacob Noordman; 53°06′41″N 5°35′40″E	Spinnenkopmolen	Before 1832	Demolished post-1850.	
Wommels	Molen van Johanna van Lynden; 53°05′49″N 5°34′37″E	Spinnenkopmolen	Before 1832	Demolished post-1850.	
Wommels	Molen van Johanna van Lynden; 53°05′16″N 5°35′26″E	Spinnenkopmolen	Before 1832	Demolished post-1850.	
Wommels	Molen van Jr. Idserd van Eijsinga; 53°06′23″N 5°35′51″E	Spinnenkopmolen	Before 1832	Demolished post-1850.	
Wommels	Molen van Jr. Idserd van Humala; 53°06′39″N 5°36′19″E	Spinnenkopmolen	Before 1832	Demolished before 1850.	
Wommels	Molen van Klaas Boersma; 53°06′40″N 5°35′31″E	Spinnenkopmolen	Before 1832	Demolished before 1850.	
Wommels	Molen van Oege Breuwsma; 53°05′40″N 5°35′53″E	Spinnenkopmolen	Before 1832	Demolished before 1850.	
Wommels	Molen van Tjitske Steensma; 53°05′52″N 5°33′59″E	Spinnenkopmolen	Before 1832	Demolished before 1850.	
Wommels	Molen van Zijtze Jouwsma; 53°06′15″N 5°34′35″E	Spinnenkopmolen	Before 1832	Demolished before 1850.	
Wommels	Polder 355; 53.°N 5.°E	Spinnenkopmolen	Before 1832	Demolished before 1929.	
Wommels	Polder 356; Warntilstermolen; 53°06′58″N 5°35′56″E	Grondzeiler	1845	Demolished c.1990.	
Wommels	Polder 357; 53°06′51″N 5°35′29″E		Between 1832 and 1850	Demolished before 1929.	
Wommels	Polder 358; 53°06′26″N 5°35′39″E	Spinnenkopmolen	Before 1832	Demolished 1931.	
Wommels	Polder 359; 53°06′11″N 5°35′52″E	Grondzeiler	Before 1832	Demolished post-1928.	
Wommels	Polder 364; Molen van Miedema; 53°06′07″N 5°35′53″E	Grondzeiler	1861	Demolished between 1963 and 1971.	
Wommels	Polder 365; 53°06′19″N 5°35′28″E	Spinnenkopmolen	Before 1832	Demolished post-1930.	
Wommels	Polder 366; 53°06′03″N 5°34′31″E	Grondzeiler	Before 1832	Demolished post-1930.	
Wommels	Polder 366a 53°06′07″N 5°34′31″E	Spinnenkopmolen	Before 1832	Demolished before 1932.	
Wommels	Polder 367; Molen van Geins; 53°05′59″N 5°36′00″E	Grondzeiler	1872	Demolished between 1952 and 1957.	
Wommels	Polder 368; Molen van Bokma; 53°05′29″N 5°35′14″E	Grondzeiler	1828	Demolished between 1951 and 1957.	
Wommels	Polder 371; 53°05′30″N 5°34′50″E	Grondzeiler	Before 1832	Demolished post-1928.	
Wommels	Polder 372; Molen van Nijdam; 53°05′30″N 5°34′03″E	Grondzeiler	Before 1832	Demolished between 1951 and 1957.	
Wommels	Polder 375; Molen van Van Dijk; 53°05′10″N 5°35′06″E	Grondzeiler	1817	Demolished between 1951 and 1958.	
Wommels	Polder 436; 53°06′21″N 5°34′24″E	Spinnenkopmolen	Before 1832	Demolished before 1929.	
Wommels	Polder 439; 53°06′44″N 5°34′35″E	Spinnenkopmolen	Before 1832	Demolished before 1929.	
Wommels	Polder 440; 53°06′59″N 5°35′04″E	Spinnenkopmolen	Before 1832	Demolished before 1929.	
Wommels	Polder 441; 53°06′34″N 5°34′47″E		Before 1850	Demolished before 1929.	
Wommels	Polder 441; 53°06′28″N 5°34′55″E	Spinnenkopmolen	Before 1832	Demolished post-1850.	
Wons	Haaijmerpolder; 53°04′56″N 5°25′17″E	Grondzeiler	Before 1850	Demolished 1925.	
Wons	Hemmenpolder; 53°04′01″N 5°25′10″E	Grondzeiler	Before 1873	Demolished before 1928.	
Wons	Hemmenpolder; 53°03′59″N 5°25′26″E	Grondzeiler	Before 1873	Demolished before 1928.	
Wons	Kleine Wonserpolder; 53°04′56″N 5°25′36″E	Spinnenkopmolen	Before 1832	Demolishedn post-1850.	
Wons	Polder 23a 53°04′30″N 5°26′04″E		Before 1832	Demolished post-1850.	
Wons	53°04′02″N 5°25′04″E	Weidemolen	Before 1873	Demolished before 1928.	
Wons	Wonserpolder; Polder De Eendracht; 53°05′27″N 5°25′28″E	Grondzeiler	1818	Demolished 1939.	
Workum	De Nijlânnermolen; 52°58′01″N 5°25′37″E	Grondzeiler	1784		
Workum	Ybema's Molen; 52°59′12″N 5°26′38″E	Grondzeiler	1899		
Workum	Het Heidenschap; 52°57′33″N 5°29′45″E	Tjasker	1915		
Workum	De Snip; 52°58′21″N 5°27′54″E	Grondzeiler			
Workum	De Engel; Molen van Hobma; 52°58′22″N 5°26′30″E	Stellingmolen	1858	Demolished post-1970.	
Workum	De Koe; Fekkesmole; Doltemolen; 52°58′54″N 5°27′01″E	Stellingmolen	1647	Demolished 1936, base demolished 1984.	
Workum	De Liefde; 52°58′58″N 5°27′20″E	Stellingmolen	1703	Demolished 1921.	
Workum	De Ossekoot; De Os; 52°59′03″N 5°27′05″E	Stellingmolen	Between 1677 and 1680	Moved to Drachten 1847.	
Workum	De Witte Falck; 52°58′51″N 5°26′56″E		Before 1698	Demolished 1716.	
Workum	Het Kalf; 52°58′55″N 5°27′12″E	Stellingmolen	Before 1718	Demolished 1822.	
Workum	Het Spinwiel; 52°58′56″N 5°27′29″E	Stellingmolen	Before 1704	Demolished 1784.	
Workum	Kleine Wiskepolder; 52°56′30″N 5°26′47″E	Grondzeiler	Before 1832	Demolished before 1922.	
Workum	Kleine Wiskepolder; 52°56′17″N 5°27′07″E	Grondzeiler	Before 1832	Demolished 1943, base demolished c.1990.	
Workum	Polder 17; 52°59′01″N 5°28′16″E	Spinnenkopmolen	Before 1832	Demolished post-1930.	
Workum	Polder 17a 52°59′05″N 5°28′01″E	Spinnenkopmolen	Before 1832	Demolished post-1850.	
Workum	Polder 21; 52°59′22″N 5°27′02″E	Spinnenkopmolen	Before 1832	Demolished post-1930.	
Workum	Polder 21a 52°59′19″N 5°27′20″E	Spinnenkopmolen	Before 1832	Demolished post-1850.	
Workum	Polder 23; 1st Polder Bokma; Spinnenkop van Bokma; 52°59′03″N 5°26′42″E	Spinnenkopmolen	Before 1832	Demolished c.1934.	
Workum	Polder 24; 52°58′55″N 5°27′49″E	Spinnenkopmolen	Before 1832	Demolished post-1850.	
Workum	Polder 24; 52°59′02″N 5°27′32″E	Spinnenkopmolen	Before 1832	Demolished post-1930.	
Workum	Polder 26; Homme Eelkespolder; 52°58′45″N 5°27′34″E	Grondzeiler	Before 1832	Demolished post-1930.	
Workum	Polder 27; Ho-mole; 52°58′37″N 5°27′08″E	Grondzeiler	1832	Burnt down 1947.	
Workum	Polder 29; Polder Het Heidenschap; Harkemamolen; 52°58′29″N 5°27′43″E	Spinnenkopmolen	Before 1832	Demolished 1942.	
Workum	Polder 30; 52°58′17″N 5°26′39″E	Grondzeiler	1907	Demolished c.1928.	
Workum	Polder 31; Polder Tomas Hof; 52°58′16″N 5°26′37″E	Spinnenkopmolen	1850	Demolished before 1948.	
Workum	Polder 32; 52°58′08″N 5°26′16″E	Spinnenkopmolen	Before 1850	Demolished before 1943.	
Workum	Polder 33; Polder Westerend; Westerendsmolen; 52°57′46″N 5°26′28″E	Grondzeiler	Before 1832	Demolished between 1930 and 1940, base demolished 1984.	
Workum	Polder 34; Kolmeer; Polder Folkertsma; 52°57′39″N 5°27′03″E	Spinnenkopmolen	Before 1718	Demolished post-1932.	
Workum	Polder 35; 52°57′51″N 5°27′11″E	Grondzeiler	Before 1832	Demolished post-1930.	
Workum	Polder 36; 52°58′20″N 5°27′23″E	Spinnenkopmolen	Before 1832	Demolished between 1880 and 1885.	
Workum	Polder 36; De Hoop; 52°58′07″N 5°27′16″E	Spinnenkopmolen	Between 1880 and 1885	Blown down 1949.	
Workum	Polder 37; 52°58′02″N 5°28′01″E	Grondzeiler	1850	Demolished 1944.	
Workum	Polder 38; 52°57′44″N 5°27′51″E	Spinnenkopmolen	1850	Demolished 1924.	
Workum	Polder 39; 52°57′23″N 5°28′31″E	Grondzeiler	Before 1832	Demolished 1924.	
Workum	Polder 40a Lutsmolen; 52°57′56″N 5°28′42″E	Grondzeiler	1865	Demolished c.1930.	
Workum	Polder 41; 52°57′19″N 5°28′11″E	Grondzeiler	Before 1832	Demolished 1939.	
Workum	Polder 42; Polder van boerderij Grut Fiskwyk; 52°57′02″N 5°28′14″E	Grondzeiler	Before 1832	Demolished 1922/23.	
Workum	Polder 43; Roodschuurstermeer; 52°56′27″N 5°28′37″E	Grondzeiler	Before 1832	Demolished 1922/23.	
Workum	Oud Polder 44; 52°56′40″N 5°27′36″E	Spinnenkopmolen	Before 1832	Demolished post-1850.	
Workum	Polder 44; 52°56′28″N 5°27′44″E	Grondzeiler	1850	Demolished 1950, base demolished 1976.	
Workum	Polder 45; 52°57′00″N 5°27′14″E	Spinnenkopmolen	Before 1832	Demolished post-1930.	
Workum	Polder 277a 52°58′12″N 5°29′11″E	Spinnenkopmolen	Before 1832	Demolished before 1850.	
Workum	Polder 287; Polder van Stellingwerf; 52°57′51″N 5°29′51″E	Grondzeiler	1866	Demolished 1921.	
Workum	Polder 289; Molen van Groot Welgelegen; 52°57′41″N 5°28′48″E	Spinnenkopmolen	Before 1778	Demolished 1942.	
Workum	Molen van Albert Potma; 52°58′23″N 5°26′43″E	Spinnenkopmolen	Before 1832	Demolished before 1850.	
Workum	Molen van Dirk Brouwer; 52°57′45″N 5°27′58″E	Spinnenkopmolen	Before 1832	Demolished before 1850.	
Workum	Molen van Jan Izenbeek; 52°57′33″N 5°24′52″E	Spinnenkopmolen	Before 1832	Demolished 1927.	
Workum	Molen van Petrus Brunger; 52°58′37″N 5°27′08″E	Spinnenkopmolen	Before 1832		
Workum	Molen van Tietje de Jong; 52°57′50″N 5°30′00″E	Spinnenkopmolen	Before 1832	Demolished c.1850.	
Workum	Noordermolen; 52°59′03″N 5°26′56″E	Standerdmolen	Before 1560	Demolished 1675.	
Workum	Polder Bloksloot; 52°56′53″N 5°28′00″E		Before 1832	Demolished 1900.	
Workum	Warkumer Noorder Rogmeulen; 52°59′01″N 5°27′04″E		1675	Demolished before 1800.	
Workum	Westerrogmolen; 52°58′45″N 5°26′20″E	Standerdmolen	Before 1664	Demolished 1764.	
Workum	Westerrogmolen; 52°58′45″N 5°26′20″E	Stellingmolen	1764	Burnt down 1879.	
Workum	Westerrogmolen; 52.°N 5.°E	Stellingmolen	1879	Demolished 1905.	
Workum	Workumer Nieuwland, Nieuwe Molen	Grondzeiler	1667–1670	Demolished post-1776.	
Workum	Workumer Nieuwland, Oude Molen; 52°58′01″N 5°25′37″E	Grondzeiler	1624	Demolished 1870.	
Workum	52°59′05″N 5°27′15″E	Wip stellingmolen	1644	Demolished 1745.	
Workum	52°58′33″N 5°26′40″E			Demolished 1755.	
Workum	52°59′03″N 5°27′16″E		Before 1718	Burnt down 1723.	
Workum	52°59′04″N 5°27′19″E		Before 1701	Demolished 1802.	
Workum	Zeelemmermolen van Workum; 52°58′30″N 5°26′28″E	Stellingmolen	Before 1808	Burnt down 1907.	
Workum	Zuidermolen; Suydermolen; 52°58′32″N 5°26′20″E	Standerdmolen	1399	Demolished before 1800.	
Woudsend	Korenmolen van Woudsend; 52°56′36″N 5°37′37″E	Standerdmolen	Before 1511	Demolished c. 1698.	
Woudsend	't Lam; 52°56′36″N 5°37′37″E	Stellingmolen	c.1698		
Woudsend	De Jager; 52°56′30″N 5°37′46″E	Stellingmolen	1719		
Woudsend	De Hoop; 52°56′38″N 5°37′51″E	Stellingmolen	1763	Demolished 1915.	
Woudsend	Molen van Age Tromp; 52°56′20″N 5°39′43″E	Spinnenkopmolen	Before 1832	Demolished post-1850.	
Woudsend	Molen van Machiel Zoethout; 52°56′12″N 5°36′46″E	Spinnenkopmolen	Before 1832	Demolished post-1850.	
Woudsend	Molen van Machiel Zoethout; 52°56′32″N 5°37′21″E	Spinnenkopmolen	Before 1832	Demolished post-1850.	
Woudsend	Molen van Stephanus de Bok; 52°56′21″N 5°37′47″E	Spinnenkopmolen	Before 1832	Demolished between 1887 and 1897.	
Woudsend	Molen van Wijbe Hettinga; 52°56′03″N 5°39′53″E		Before 1832	Demolished post-1850.	
Woudsend	Polder 17; 52°56′02″N 5°40′06″E		Before 1873	Demolished post-1909.	
Woudsend	Polder 215; 52°56′11″N 5°40′38″E	Spinnenkopmolen	Before 1832	Demolished before 1930.	
Woudsend	Polder 217; 52°56′24″N 5°37′53″E	Grondzeiler	Before 1832	Demolished post-1930.	
Woudsend	Polder 217a 52°56′31″N 5°38′04″E		1873	Demolished before 1930.	
Woudsend	Polder 218; 52°56′21″N 5°37′47″E	Grondzeiler	Between 1887 and 1897	Demolished between 1909 and 1932.	
Woudsend	Nieuw Polder 219; 52°56′30″N 5°37′21″E	Grondzeiler	Before 1873	Demolished before 1930.	
Woudsend	Polder 220; 52°56′17″N 5°37′23″E	Grondzeiler	Before 1832	Demolished post-1930.	
Woudsend	Polder 221; 52°56′07″N 5°36′37″E	Grondzeiler	Before 1873	Demolished before 1930.	
Woudsend	Polder 233; 52°56′45″N 5°37′26″E	Grondzeiler	Before 1832	Demolished post-1930.	
Woudsend	Polder 234; 52°57′09″N 5°37′56″E	Spinnenkopmolen	Before 1832	Demolished post-1930.	
Woudsend	52°56′10″N 5°36′46″E		1850	Demolished before 1930.	
Woudsend	Redigescharpolder; 52°56′55″N 5°38′09″E	Spinnenkopmolen	Before 1832	Demolished post-1930.	
Wyns	Wijnsermolen; Wynzer Mûne; 53°15′41″N 5°50′43″E	Grondzeiler	1871	Molendatabase (in Dutch); De Hollandsche Molen (in Dutch)	
Wyns	Molen van Sijmon Sinnema; 53°14′41″N 5°50′07″E		Before 1832	Demolished before 1850.	
Wyns	Polder 109; 53°14′49″N 5°50′01″E		Before 1832	Demolished between 1930 and 1944.	
Wyns	Polder 109a 53°14′56″N 5°50′08″E	Weidemolen	Before 1854	Demolished before 19626.	
Wyns	Wijnser Polder part x 53°15′48″N 5°50′21″E	Weidemolen	Before 1832	Demolished between 1850 and 1874.	
Wyns	Wijnser Polder part y 53°15′46″N 5°50′25″E	Weidemolen	Before 1832	Demolished between 1850 and 1875.	
Wyns	Wijnser Polder part z 53°15′34″N 5°50′31″E	Weidemolen	Before 1832	Demolished between 1850 and 1874.	

== Y ==
Location	Name of mill	Type	Built	Notes	Photograph
Ypecolsga	Polder 9; 52°55′41″N 5°35′20″E	Spinnenkopmolen	Before 1832	Demolished before 1929.	
Ypecolsga	Oud Polder 10; 52°55′36″N 5°35′28″E	Spinnenkopmolen	Before 1832	Demolished between 1850 and 1873.	
Ypecolsga	Nieuw Polder 10; 52°55′38″N 5°35′38″E		1873	Demolished before 1929.	
Ypecolsga	Oud Polder 11; 52°55′38″N 5°35′45″E	Spinnenkopmolen	Before 1832	Demolished between 1850 and 1873.	
Ypecolsga	Nieuw Polder 11; 52°55′33″N 5°35′36″E		1873	Demolished before 1930.	
Ypecolsga	Polder 12; 52°55′48″N 5°36′05″E	Spinnenkopmolen	Before 1832	Demolished before 1929.	
Ypecolsga	Polder 13; 52°55′56″N 5°36′17″E	Spinnenkopmolen	Before 1832	Demolished before 1929.	
Ypecolsga	Polder 13; 52°56′03″N 5°36′30″E	Spinnenkopmolen	Before 1832	Demolished before 1930.	
Ysbrechtum	Molen van Baron Justinus Reingers; 53°02′58″N 5°38′02″E	Spinnenkopmolen	Before 1832	Demolished before 1850.	
Ysbrechtum	Polder 94; 53°02′45″N 5°37′20″E	Spinnenkopmolen	Before 1832	Demoplished post-1930.	
Ysbrechtum	Polder 95; 53°02′31″N 5°38′25″E	Spinnenkopmolen	Before 1832	Demolished between 1930 and 1955.	
Ysbrechtum	Polder 09; 53°02′50″N 5°38′49″E	Grondzeiler	Before 1832	Demolished 1922.	
Ysbrechtum	Polder 298; 53°03′13″N 5°38′22″E	Spinnenkopmolen	Before 1832	Demolished 1922.	
Ysbrechtum	Polder 300; 53°02′55″N 5°38′15″E	Grondzeiler	Between 1850 and 1873	Demolished 1922.	
Ysbrechtum	Polder 301; 53°02′52″N 5°38′39″E	Spinnenkopmolen	Before 1832	Demolished 1922.	
Ysbrechtum	Polder 302; 53°03′02″N 5°37′54″E		Before 1832	Demolished before 1929.	
Ysbrechtum	53°03′17″N 5°38′01″E		Before 1909	Demolished before 1930.	

== Z ==
Location	Name of mill	Type	Built	Notes	Photograph
Zurich	Gooijumerpolder; 53°06′13″N 5°24′16″E	Grondzeiler	1817	Demolished post-1930.	
Zurich	Hiddumerpolder; 53°05′43″N 5°23′53″E	Grondzeiler	1871	Demolished 1908.	
Zurich	Zuricherolder; 53°06′26″N 5°23′21″E	Grondzeiler	Before 1850	Demolished 1938.	
Zweins	Molen van Izaak de Swart; 53°11′23″N 5°36′54″E		Before 1832	Demolished before 1850.	
Zwette	Kramers Molen	Spinnenkop	1995	Moved to Goutum, 2002.	
Zwette	Molen Hoogland	Spinnenkop	1995	Burnt down 1999.	

== Notes ==
Mills still standing marked in bold. Known building dates are bold, otherwise the date is the earliest known date the mill was standing.
