= Driezum =

Driezum Driesum
- Village
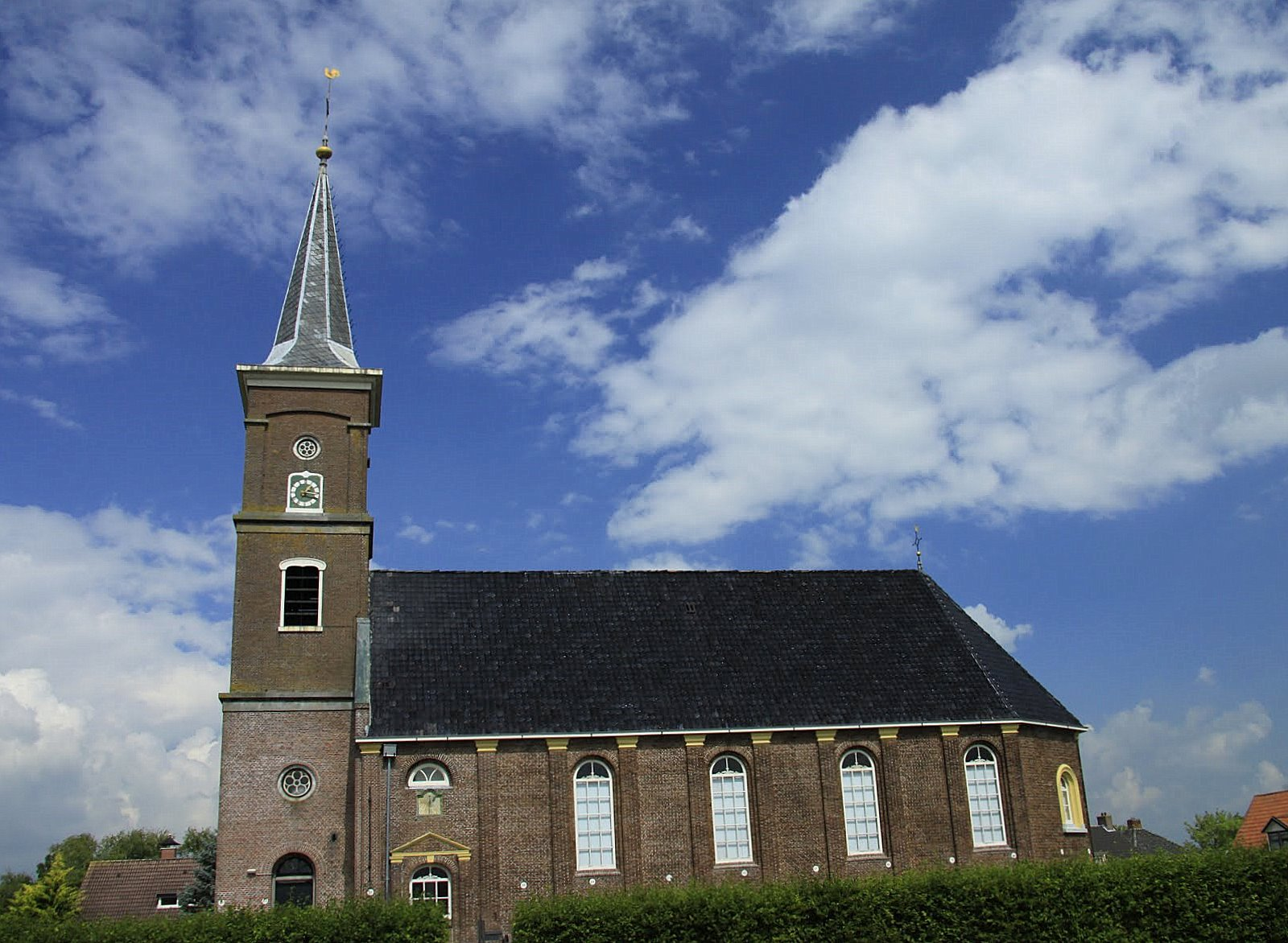
- Driezum Church

- Flag Coat of arms

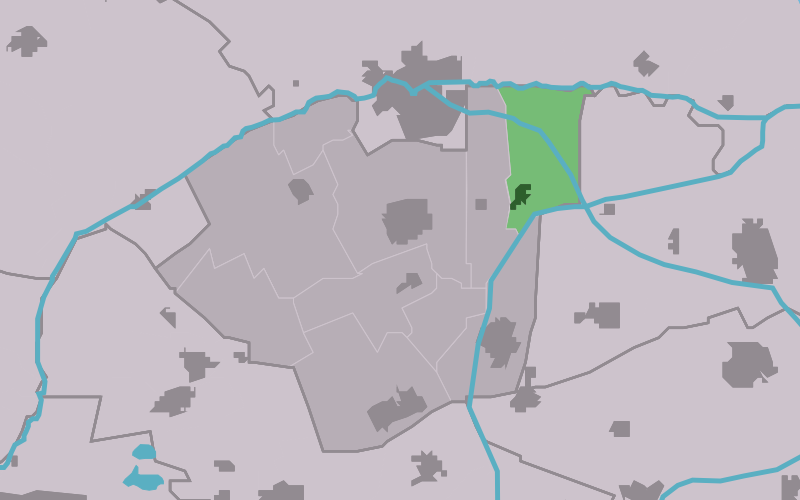
- Location in Dantumadiel municipality

- Location in the Netherlands Driezum (Netherlands)
- Country: Netherlands
- Province: Friesland
- Municipality: Dantumadiel

Population (2017)
  - Total: 850
- Time zone: UTC+1 (CET)
  - Summer (DST): UTC+2 (CEST)

Driezum (Dutch: Driesum) is a village in the Dantumadiel municipality of Friesland, the Netherlands. It had a population of around 850 in 2017.

Together with Wâlterswâld it forms the twin village of Driezum-Wâlterswâld. The residential center of Driezum and the southern residential center of Wâlterswâld form a unit. The two villages have many common associations and a common village community centre, which is located in Wâlterswâld. On the eastern side of Driezum lies the hamlet Eastwâld.

== History ==
The place Driezum is mentioned in the 12th century as Dresem. This spelling also occurs in 1486-873 as well as in 1543. In the 16th century the maps speak of Dresum. In 1520 Peter van Thabor calls the village Dryesen. The village lies on a sand ridge in the scenic landscape of the Dokkumer Wouden.

It is more than possible that the village original was lying a bit more northeast of the modern center of the village on an artificial dwelling mound, an so called terp. And then later on the village switched to the sandy ridge and grew there. After the move the terp was still slightly populated and was in 1511 mentioned simply as Terp. In 1540 its mentioned as Deser Terp and in 1543 as Dresum Terp. Around 1700 its called Kanter on a map. That's probably the family that lives on the terp then. An indication that the place itself was not seen as big enough place to be called. In the 19th century the terp is called Driezumer Terp.

In 1930 its called Driesumer Terp on the Kadaster map and from 1970 it's spelled as Driesummerterp. In the 17th and 18th centuries the village itself is mainly mentioned as Driesum. In 1786 one also sees the spelling Driezum. The last two spellings then appear alternately. Since the 20th century, the official spelling became Driesum, with Driezum being the West Frisian name.

The village was from 1971 the administrative center of the municipality of Dantumadiel. The town hall was located in the noble stone house (stins) of Rinsmastate. In 1999 the new town hall was opened in Damwâld, which meant that Driezum was dismissed as an administrative center.

In 2008 the municipality Dantumadiel decided that it was going the replace all the official Dutch names within the municipality with the West Frisian names, meaning that Driezum was from 2009 the official name for the village.
