= Eastwâld =

Eastwâld Oostwoud
- Hamlet
- Location in the Netherlands Eastwâld (Netherlands)
- Country: Netherlands
- Province: Friesland
- Municipality: Dantumadiel
- Time zone: UTC+1 (CET)
  - Summer (DST): UTC+2 (CEST)
- Postal code: 9114

Eastwâld (Dutch: Oostwoud) is a hamlet in the municipality of Dantumadiel in the province of Friesland, the Netherlands.

It is located to the east of Driezum, with habitation on both sides of the Strobosser Trekfeart. On the east side, it passes into the hamlet of Keatlingwier. On the west side lies the Rinsma State, which was an important stately house and served as the town hall of Dantumadiel from 1971 until 1999. The Driezumer Bos is a wood situated around the state, and on the southern grounds of the hamlet lies the recreation and nature area Rinsma pôlle. This area was the former Petsleat / Swemmer dredging depot, used between 1972 and 1985.

== History ==
The place was first mentioned in 1543 as Oestwoldt. In 1580, it was listed as Oestwoud.

Eastwâld probably developed into its own settlement after the first part of the Strobosser Trekfeart was excavated in the 16th century. This boat / barge-canal was paid for by the inhabitants of the region themselves. In 1654-1656, the city Dokkum paid for the second part of the canal. However, the costs were too high, and the canal fell into the hands of creditors. To get money out of it, four toll houses were built along the canal, two of which were placed at Eastwâld. In 1780, major maintenance was required on the canal, but the owners decided to sell the canal to the province of Friesland instead of deepening it themselves. In 1876, the Dutch government became the owner of the canal and the adjacent path, the Trekwei.

In the 18th and 19th centuries, the hamlet was called Oostwoude, a name that sometimes pops up in the 20th and 21st century alongside Oostwoud in Dutch. In West Frisian, the place is called Eastwâld. In 2008, the municipality of Dantumadiel decided to replace all the official Dutch names within the municipality with the West Frisian names, making Eastwâld the official name for the hamlet from 2009 onward.
