= Langwert, Winsum =

Smock mill in the Netherlands

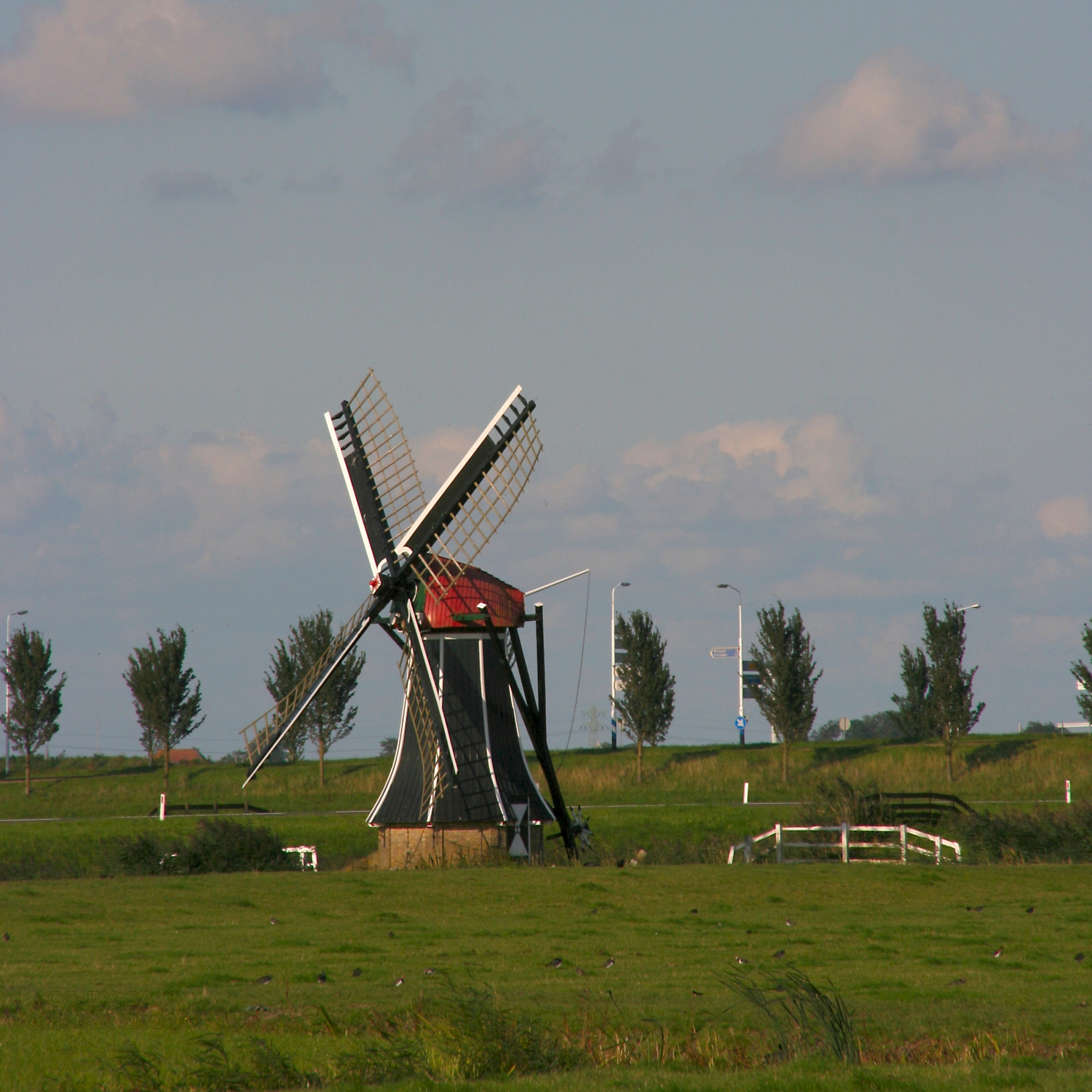
- Langwert, September 2008.

Origin
- Mill name: Langwert
- Mill location: Aan de weg Leeuwarden-Bolsward 8831 Winsum
- Coordinates: 53°09′13″N 5°36′41″E
- Operator(s): Gemeente Littenseradiel
- Year built: 1979

Information
- Purpose: Drainage mill
- Type: Smock mill
- Storeys: One storey smock
- Base storeys: One storey base
- Smock sides: Eight sides
- No. of sails: Four sails
- Type of sails: Common sails
- Windshaft: Cast iron
- Winding: Tailpole and winch
- Type of pump: Archimedes' screw

Langwert is a smock mill in Winsum, Friesland, Netherlands which was built in 1979 and is under restoration. It is listed as a Rijksmonument.

== History ==
Langwert formerly stood on different site in Winsum, where it was known as the Molen van Tjilbert. It had been built in 1894 by millwright Folkert Wijnstra of Spannum, Friesland to drain an area of 70 pondemaat (26 ha; 64 acres). The mill was moved to its current site in 1979, replacing a mill that had been built in 1863 and that had burnt down on 13 March 1974. The work was done by a carpenter from Winsum with assistance from millwright Westra of Franeker, Friesland. The mill was damaged in a storm in September 2011. Restoration by Kolthof Bouwbedrijf bv of Stiens, Friesland began in the summer of 2014. It is listed as a Rijksmonument, №8529.

== Description ==
Langwert is what the Dutch describe as a Grondzeiler. It is a one-storey smock mill on a single storey base. There is no stage, the sails reaching almost to ground level. The mill is winded by tailpole and winch. The smock and cap are clad in vertical boards. The sails are Common sails. They have a span of 11.70 metres (38 ft 5 in). The sails are carried on a wooden windshaft. The windshaft carries the brake wheel which has 35 cogs. This drives the wallower (18 cogs) at the top of the upright shaft. At the bottom of the upright shaft there are two crown wheels The upper crown wheel, which has 30 cogs drives an Archimedes' screw via a crown wheel. The lower crown wheel, which has 31 cogs is carried on the axle of an Archimedes' screw, which is used to drain the polder. The axle of the screw is 25 centimetres (10 in) diameter and 3.33 metres (10 ft 11 in) long. The screw is 1.18 metres (3 ft 10 in) diameter. It is inclined at 21°. Each revolution of the screw lifts 204 litres (45 imp gal) of water.

== Public access ==
De Beintemapoldermolen is usually open on Sunday afternoons, or by appointment.
