= De Nijlânnermolen, Workum =

Windmill in Workum, Netherlands

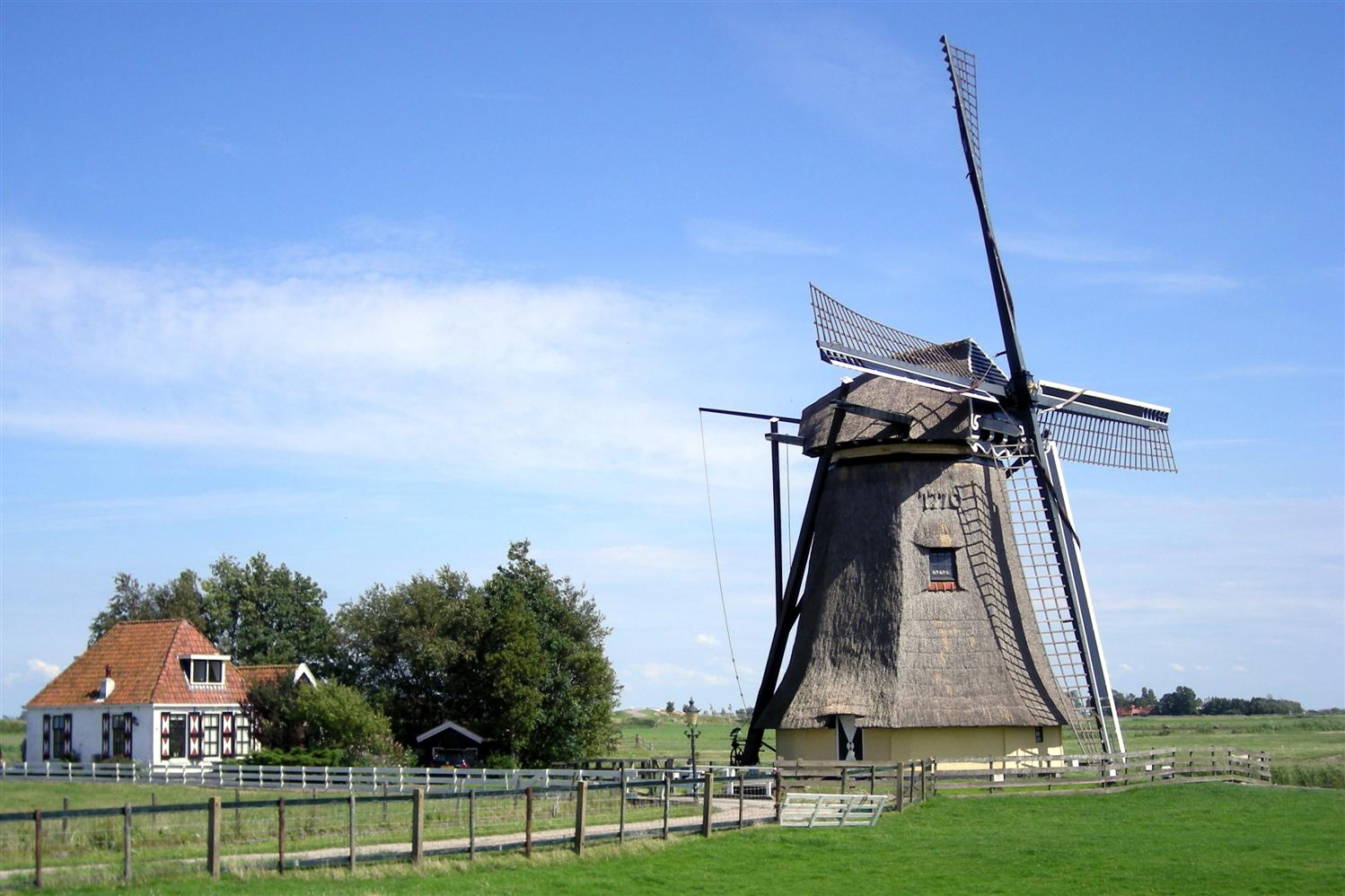
- De Nijlânnermolen, July 2007.

Origin
- Mill name: De Nijlânnermolen
- Mill location: Hylperdyk 3, 8711 HJ, Workum
- Coordinates: 52°58′02″N 5°25′37″E
- Operator(s): Molenstichting Sûdwest Fryslân
- Year built: 1785

Information
- Purpose: Drainage mill
- Type: Smock mill
- Storeys: Two storey smock
- Base storeys: One storey base
- Smock sides: Eight sides
- No. of sails: Four sails
- Type of sails: Common sails
- Windshaft: Cast iron
- Winding: Tailpole and winch
- Auxiliary power: Diesel engine
- Type of pump: Archimedes' screw

De Nijlânnermolen is a smock mill in Workum, Friesland, Netherlands. It has been restored to working order and is designated as a reserve mill. It is listed as a Rijksmonument.

== History ==
De Nijlânnermolen was built in 1785. The first mill on this site was built in 1770. It had a sail span of 60 Dutch feet (19.56 metres (64 ft 2 in)). The mill drove a scoopwheel. It soon became apparent that this mill was too small due to insufficient pumping capacity. Following a major inundation in 1776, a new mill was built by millwright Widmer Sipkes in 1784-85. The mill had originally been built in 1770 and was moved here, being erected on the base of the existing mill. It had a sail span of 76 Dutch feet (24.78 metres (81 ft 4 in)).

De Nijlânnermolen was worked by wind until 1950, when a diesel engine was placed in De Nijlânnermolen and a new, larger, Archimedes' screw was installed. The mill was sold to the Waterschap Tusken Mar en Klif. In 1987, the mill was sold to the Workumer Molenstichting for ƒ1. The mill was restored in 1987-88 by Bouw '75 of Workum, at a cost of ƒ182,000. The restored mill was set to work again on 8 October 1988. A replacement Archimedes' screw was fitted in 2006. The mill is now owned by the Molenstichting Sûdwest Fryslân. Designated as being held i reserve, it is listed as a Rijksmonument, №39452.

== Description ==
De Nijlânnermolen is what the Dutch describe as a Grondzeiler. It is a two storey smock mill on a single storey base. There is no stage, the sails reaching almost to ground level. The mill is winded by tailpole and winch. The smock and cap are thatched. The sails are Common sails. They have a span of 22.80 metres (74 ft 10 in). The sails are carried on a cast iron windshaft, which was cast by Gietijzerij L I Enthoven en Co., The Hague, South Holland. The windshaft carries the brake wheel which has 65 cogs. This drives the wallower (32 cogs) at the top of the upright shaft. At the bottom of the upright shaft there are two crown wheels The upper crown wheel, which has 37 cogs drives an Archimedes' screw via a crown wheel. The lower crown wheel, which has 36 cogs is carried on the axle of an Archimedes' screw, which is used to drain the polder. The Archimedes screw fitted to the mill in 2006 has a diameter of 1.40 metres (4 ft 7 in).

This data applies to the Archimedes' screw fitted to the mill between 1950 and 2006:- The axle of the screw was 94 centimetres (37 in) diameter and 5.94 metres (19 ft 6 in) long. The screw was 1.80 metres (5 ft 11 in) diameter. It was inclined at 19°. Each revolution of the screw lifted 1,698 litres (374 imp gal) of water.

== Public access ==
De Nijlânnermolen is open on Saturdays from 09:00 to 12:00, or by appointment.
