= Ybema's Molen, Workum =

Windmill in Workum, Netherlands

Ybema's molen, Workum
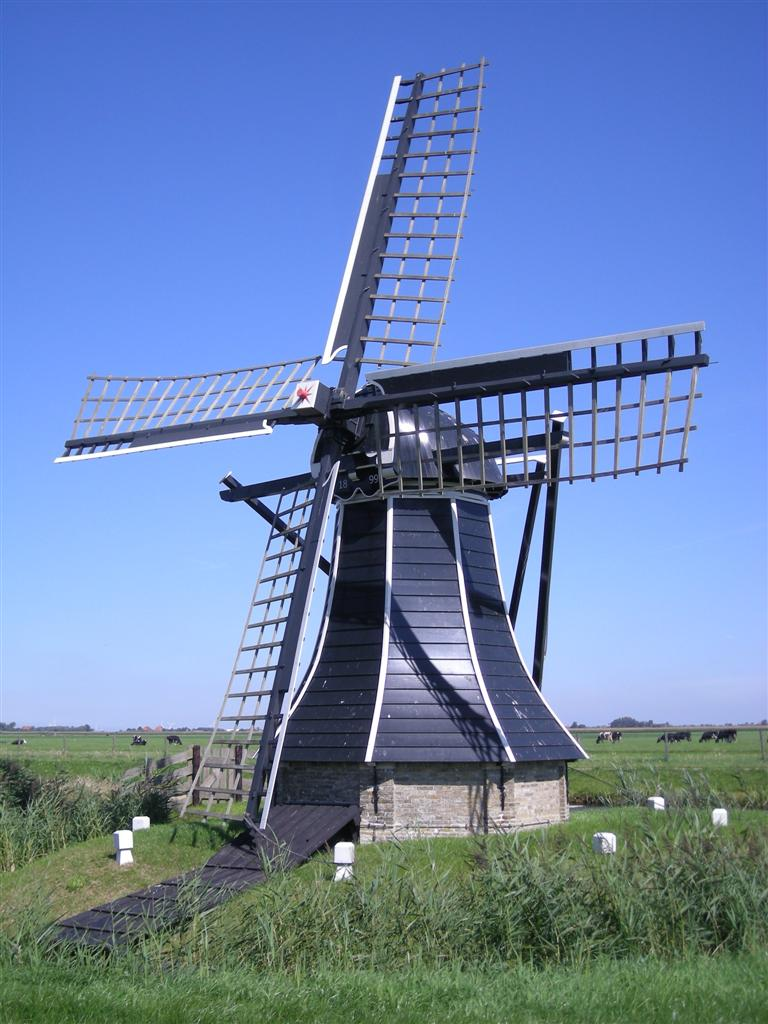
- Ybema's molen, August 2007.

Origin
- Mill name: Ybema's molen
- Mill location: Aan de Yskeboerevaart, Workum
- Coordinates: 52°59′12″N 5°26′38″E
- Operator(s): Molenstichting Nijefurd
- Year built: 1899

Information
- Purpose: Drainage mill
- Type: Smock mill
- Storeys: One storey smock
- Base storeys: One storey base
- Smock sides: Eight sides
- No. of sails: Four sails
- Type of sails: Common sails
- Windshaft: Cast iron
- Winding: Tailpole and winch
- Type of pump: Archimedes' screw

Ybema's molen is a smock mill in Workum, Friesland, Netherlands. It has been restored to working order. Designated as being held in reserve, it is listed as a Rijksmonument.

== History ==
Ybema's molen was built in 1899. It worked by wind until 1951 but was derelict by 1955 when it was restored by carpenter F de Groot of Ferwoude, Friesland at a cost of ƒ4,130.38. In August 1963, the mill was bought by the Gemeente Nijefurd for ƒ1. Further restorations were carried out in 1969 and 1981. In 1986, the mill was sold to the Molenstichting Nijefurd. By 1995, the Archimedes' screw had been removed.

In 2006, the mill was fully restored. A new cast iron windshaft was fitted, replacing the previous wooden one. A new Archimedes screw was fitted and the mill made workable again. The mill was designated by Wetterskip Fryslân as being held in reserve. A sail broke on 27 November 2011. A replacement pair of sails was fitted in November 2012. The mill is listed as a Rijksmonument, №39517.

== Description ==
Ybema's molen is what the Dutch describe as a Grondzeiler. It is a single storey smock mill on a single storey base. There is no stage, the sails reaching almost to ground level. The mill is winded by tailpole and winch. The smock and cap are boarded. The sails are Common sails. They have a span of 10.20 metres (33 ft 6 in). The sails are carried on a cast iron windshaft. The windshaft carries the brake wheel which has 31 cogs. This drives the wallower (16 cogs) at the top of the upright shaft. At the bottom of the upright shaft there are two crown wheels. The upper crown wheel, which has 32 cogs drives an Archimedes' screw via a crown wheel. The lower crown wheel, which has 31 cogs is carried on the axle of the Archimedes' screw. The screw is 90 centimetres (2 ft 11 in) diameter.

== Public access ==
Ybema's molen is open by appointment.
