= Workum =

Workum West Frisian: Warkum
- City
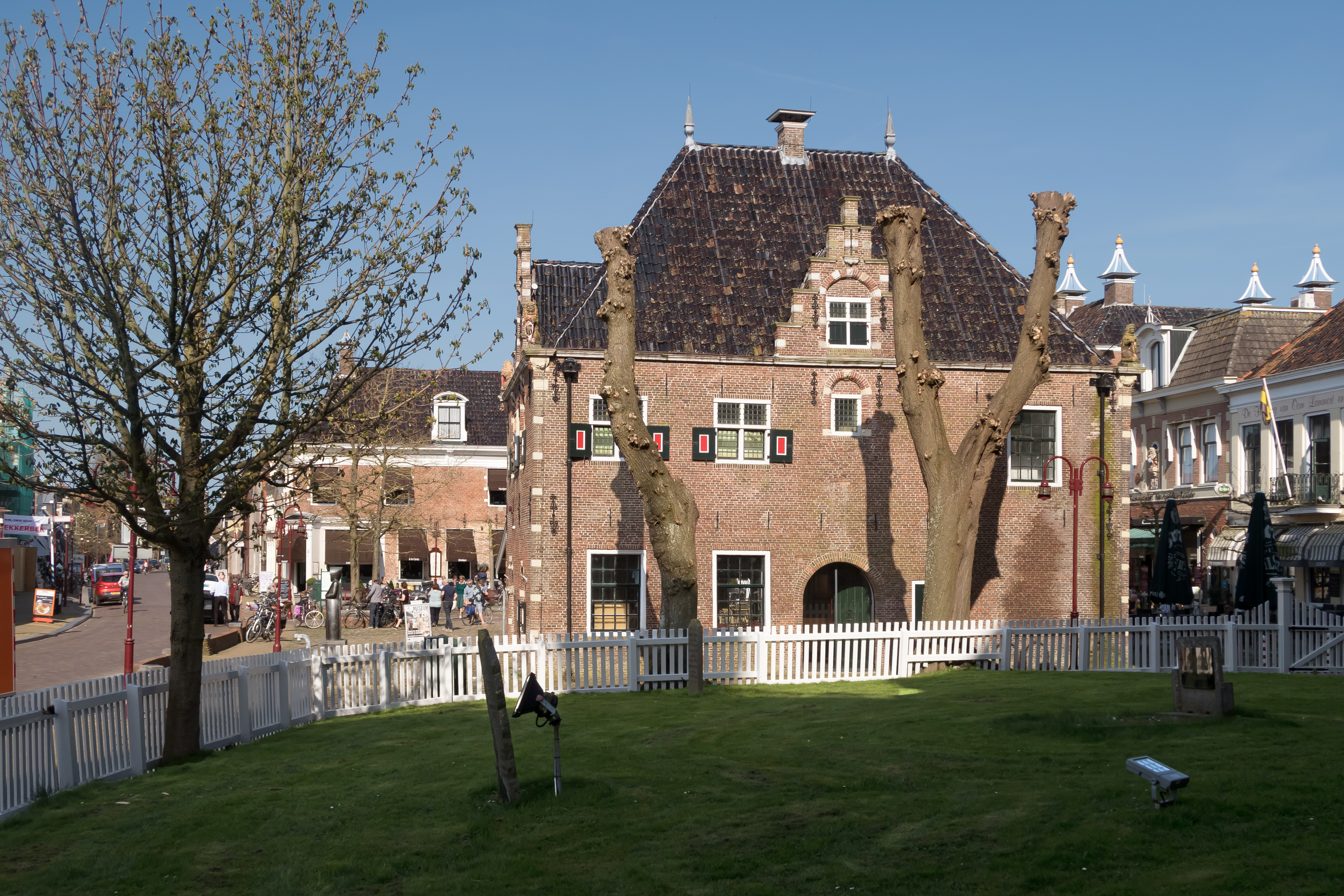

- Flag Coat of arms

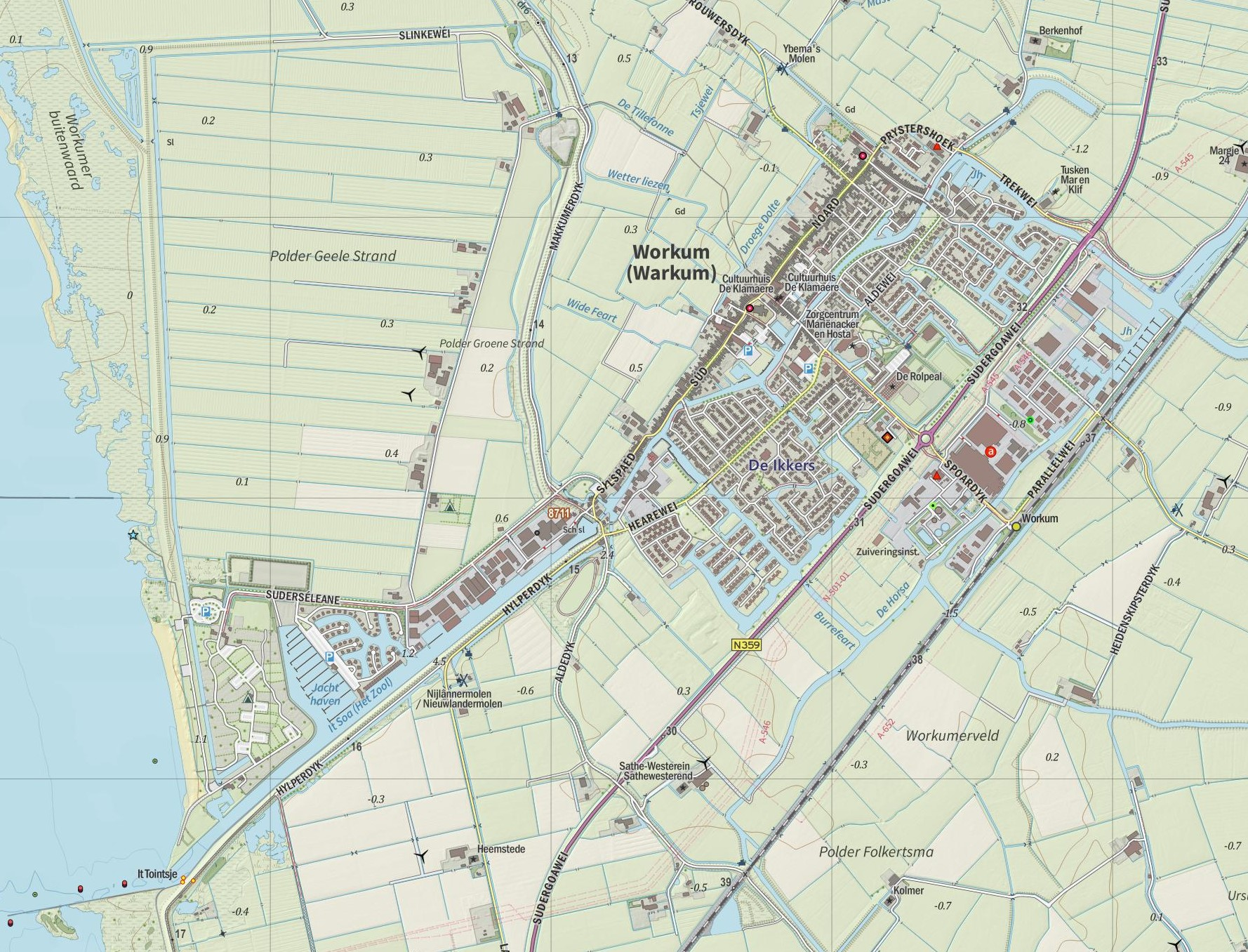
- Map of Workum

- Location in the Netherlands Workum (Netherlands)
- Country: Netherlands
- Province: Friesland
- Municipality: Súdwest-Fryslân

Population (2017)
  - Total: 4,435
- Time zone: UTC+1 (CET)
  - Summer (DST): UTC+2 (CEST)
- Postal code: 8711
- Telephone area: 0515

Workum (West Frisian: Warkum) is a city located in the municipality of Súdwest-Fryslân in Friesland, Netherlands. It received city rights in 1399 and is one of the eleven cities of Friesland. It had a population of 4,435 in January 2017.

== Overview ==
Workum is best known for its museum dedicated to the artist Jopie Huisman. There are four windmills in Workum; De Nijlânnermolen, De Snip, It Heidenskip and Ybema's Molen.

== Notable people ==
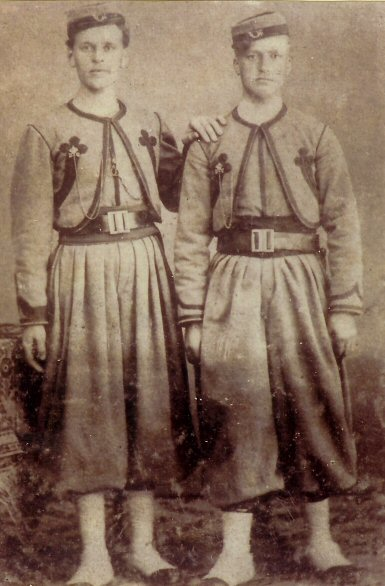
Douwe and Matthijs Walta wearing their Papal Zouaves uniform, 1870

- Aeint Herman de Boer, Dutch businessman who was the owner of Hotel de Boer in Medan, Dutch East Indies
- Hotze Koch, 22 October 1867, founder of the Quanah Tribune-Chief newspaper
- Douwe and Matthijs Walta, Dutch brothers from Workum who joined the Papal Zouaves
- Kim H. Veltman (born 1948), Dutch-Canadian historian of science
- Sybrand Buma (born 1965), Dutch politician
- Jopie Huisman (1922–2000), painter.

== Gallery ==
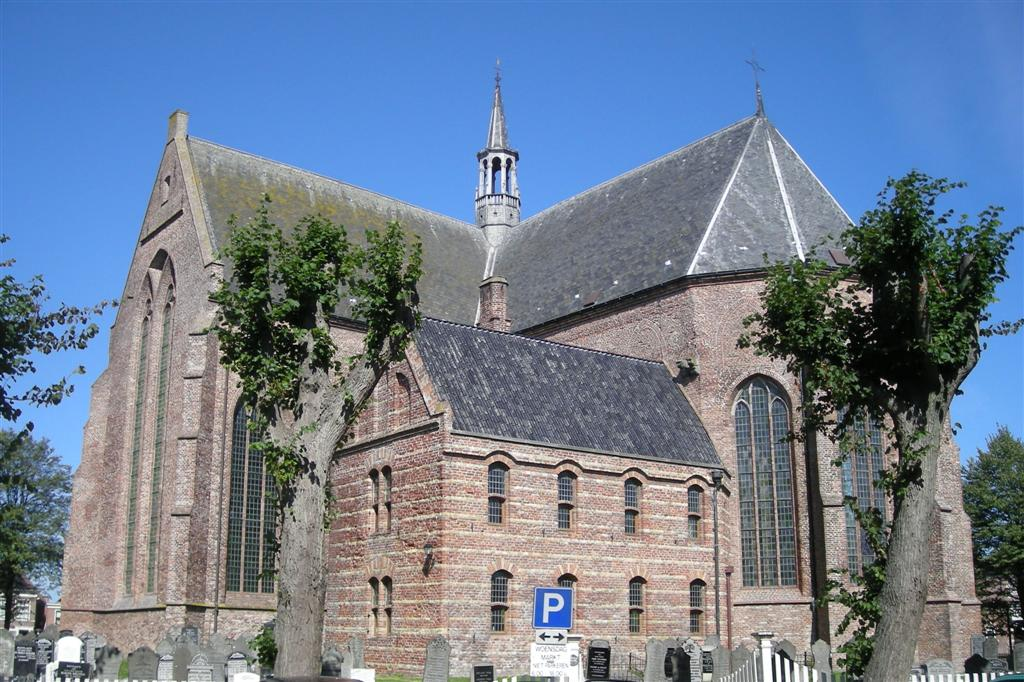
Gertrudis church

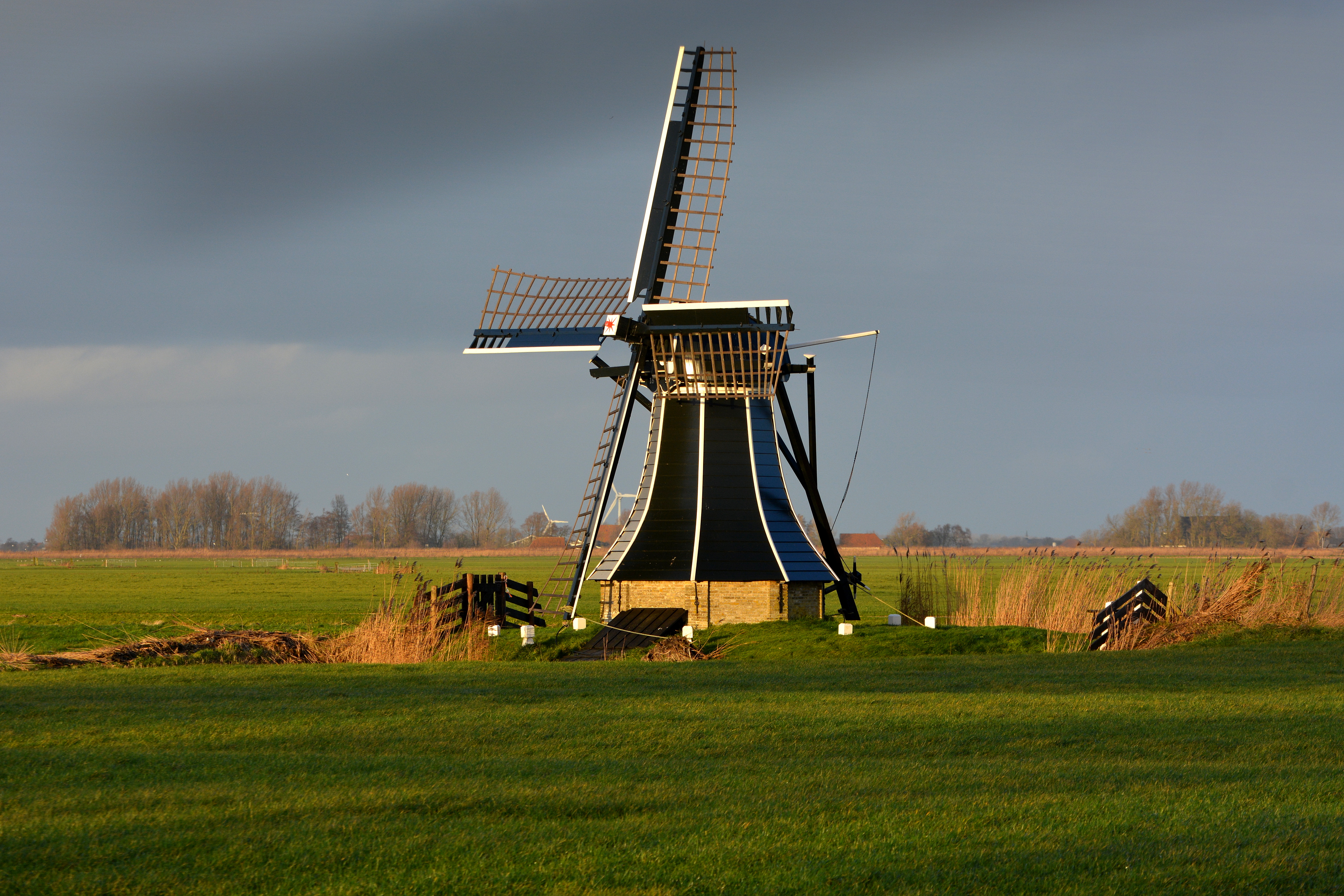
Ybema's Molen

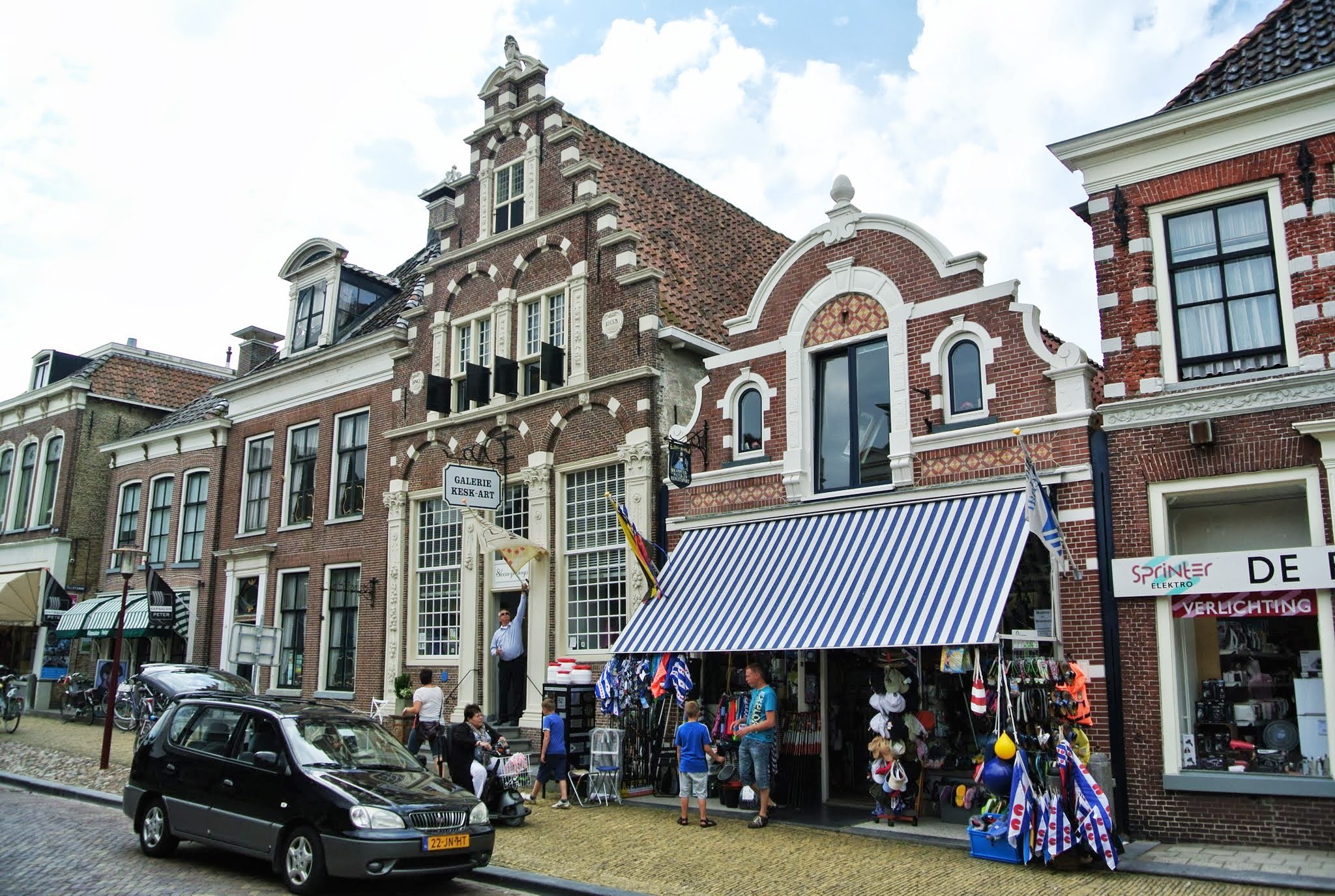
City centre

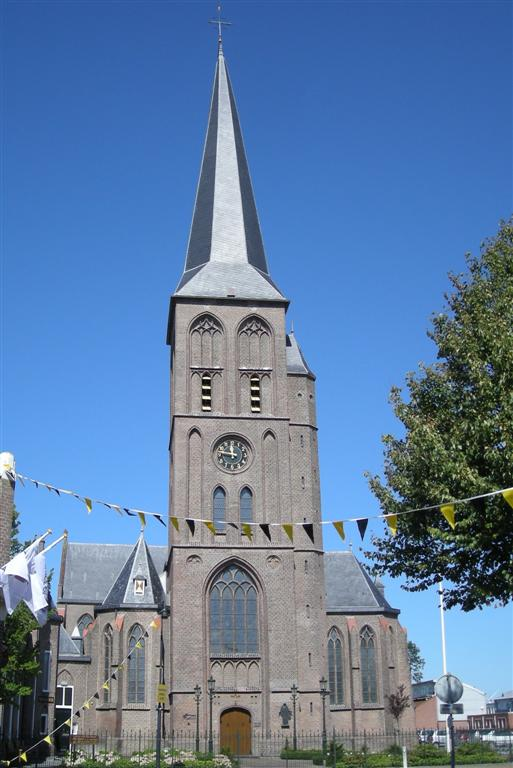
Werenfridus church

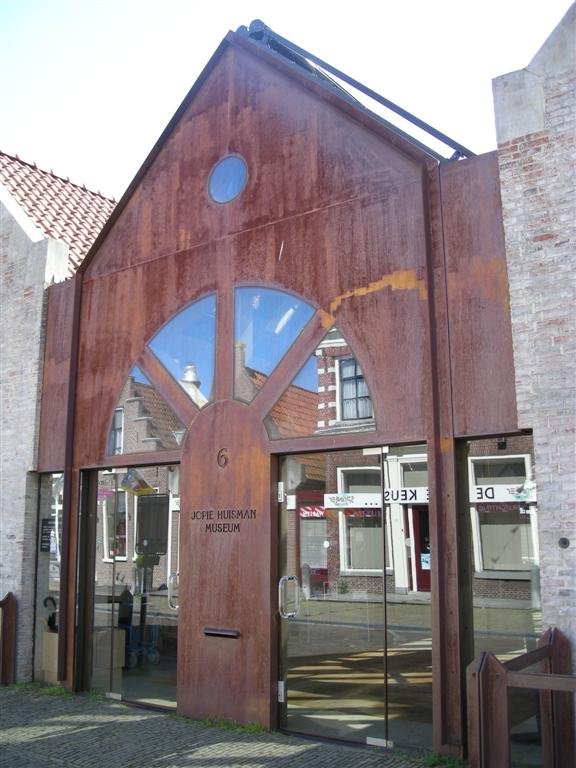
Jopie Huisman Museum
