= Wâlterswâld =

Wâlterswâld Wouterswoude
- Village
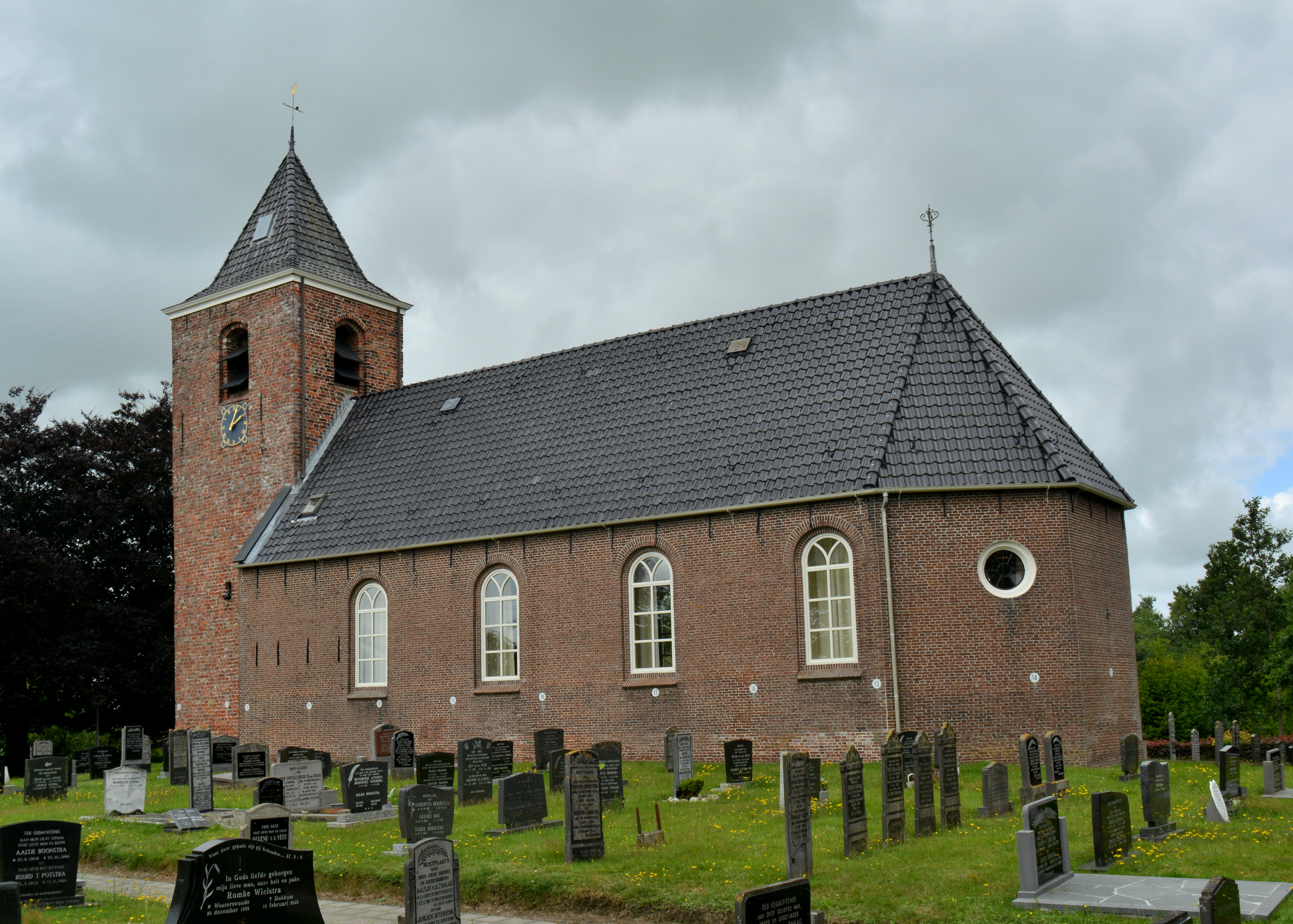
- Dutch Reformed Church of Wâlterswâld (2017)

- Flag Coat of arms

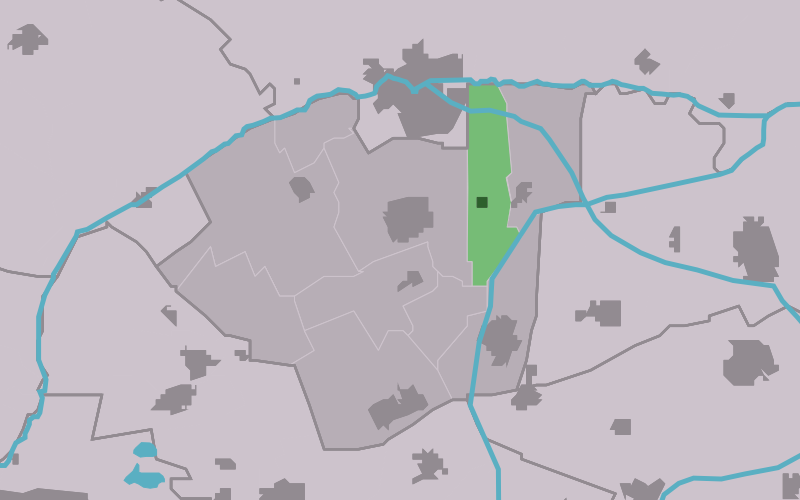
- Location in Dantumadiel municipality

- Location in the Netherlands Wâlterswâld (Netherlands)
- Country: Netherlands
- Province: Friesland
- Municipality: Dantumadiel

Population (2017)
  - Total: 920
- Time zone: UTC+1 (CET)
  - Summer (DST): UTC+2 (CEST)
- Website: Official

Wâlterswâld (Dutch: Wouterswoude) is a village in Dantumadiel municipality, Friesland, the Netherlands. The village had a population of approximately 920 in 2017.

The village as two residential centers, a northern and southern center. The southern center forms a unit with the residential center of the village Driezum. Therefore together with Driezum it forms the twin village of Driezum-Wâlterswâld. The two villages have many common associations and a common village community centre, called De Nije Warf and which is located in Wâlterswâld.

== History ==
The place was probably founded on the artificial dwelling mound, an so called terp called Walthiem and which was located southeast of Dokkum and north of the modern village of Wâlterswâld. The modern village of Wâlterswâld may be an slowly relocation from the actual terp site to the peat swamp area south of it that was called Walters halen in 1402. This area is located in the scenic landscape of the Dokkumer Wouden and was later called Walthiem. The countryside is still called Walthiem. The village is first cited in West Frisian as Walters wald in 1482 and in 1540 in Dutch as Wolterwold.

Walthiem's terp location is a bit unclear. There were two terpen close to each other southeast of Dokkum. Both terpen could be the origin of the village. On the largest terp a chapel was founded, with a statue of Mary in it. This was mentioned in a charter in 1331, with the place indication as in Montibus as in 'on the mountain'. The chapel was later demolished and later an abbey cloister was created, like a monastic grange of the Bagijn monastery Sion. In 1664 it is mentioned as Sionsberg, that name has been retained thereafter. The Sionsberg became part of Dokkum at the end of the 20th century, located in the industrial area called Hogedijken.

It is not entirely clear why exactly the inhabitants of the mound settlement moved into the peat swamp area, but it may have to do with the first reclamation works of the area in the 13th and 14th centuries. The village is known as a peat mining and cultivation village. In 1573 the place was mentioned as Walters wolde and in 1664 as Wolterswolde. The village was developed on two different roads, the Foarwei (south) and the Achterwei (north). This created two residential areas. The southern residential core has as good as merged with that of the village of Driezum.

The name of the village was Wouterswoude from the 18th century. In West Frisian the place is called Wâlterswâld. In 2008 the municipality Dantumadiel decided that it was going the replace all the official Dutch names within the municipality with the West Frisian names, meaning that Wâlterswâld was from 2009 the official name for the village.
