= De Snip, Workum =

Smock mill in Friesland, Netherlands

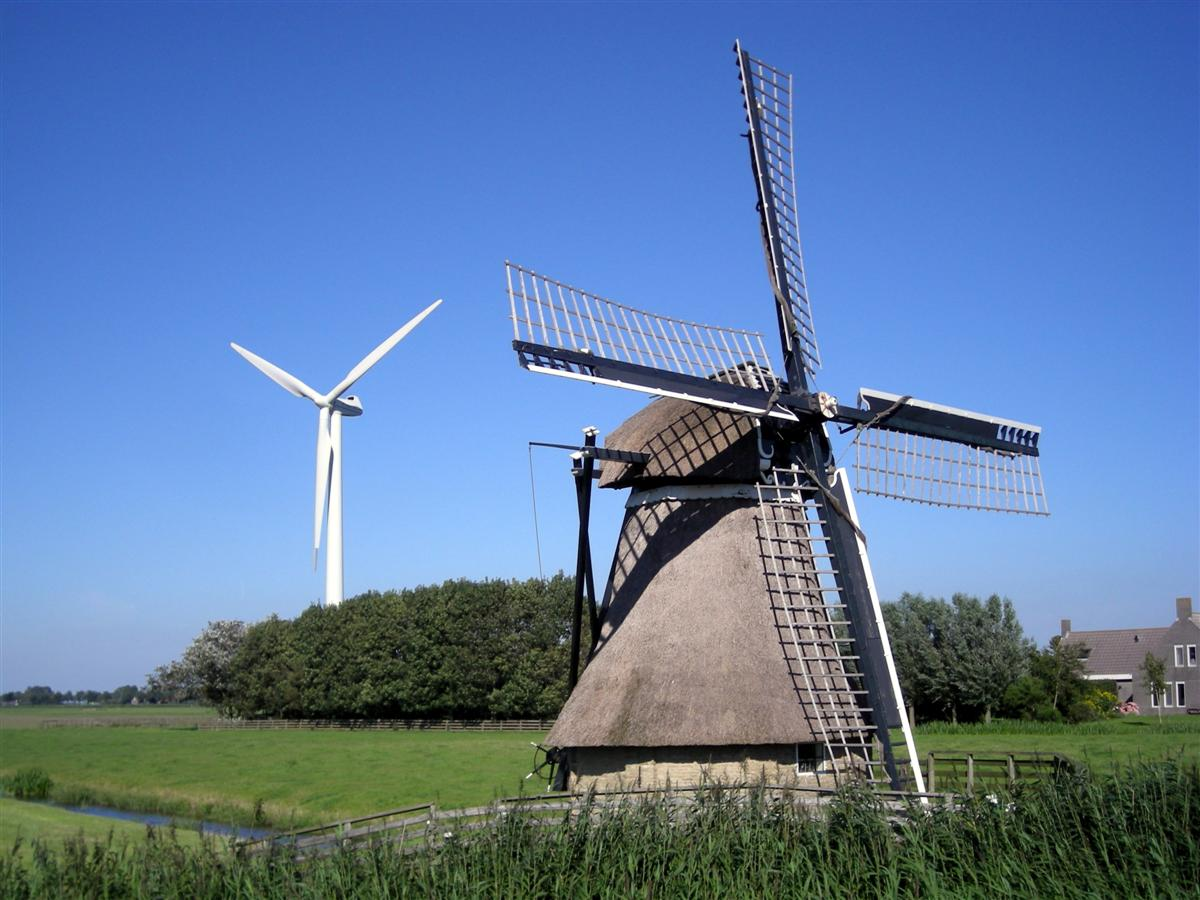
- De Snip, August 2007.
- Interactive map of De Snip, Workum

Origin
- Mill name: De Snip
- Mill location: Heidenskipsterdyk 1, 8711 HP, Workum
- Coordinates: 52°58′21″N 5°27′54″E
- Operator: Molenstichting Sûdwest Fryslân
- Year built: Mid-19th century

Information
- Purpose: Drainage mill
- Type: Smock mill
- Storeys: Two storey smock
- Base storeys: One storey base
- Smock sides: Eight sides
- No. of sails: Four sails
- Type of sails: Common sails
- Windshaft: Cast iron
- Winding: Tailpole and winch
- Type of pump: Archimedes' screw

De Snip is a smock mill in Workum, Friesland, Netherlands. It has been restored to working order. Designated as being held in reserve, it is listed as a Rijksmonument.

== History ==
De Snip was built in the mid-19th century to drain a 300 pondemaat (110 ha; 270 acres) polder. A hollow post mill having previously stood on the site. Following a long period of dereliction, the mill was restored in 1974-75 by millwright Tacoma of Stiens, Friesland. The windshaft in the mill came from De Kolthofpoldermolen, Oosterbierum, Friesland, which had burnt down on 13 December 1972. The mill formerly had a wooden windshaft. In 1977, De Snip was in the ownership of the Workumer Molenstichting. A new Archimedes' screw . The mill is owned by the Molenstichting Sûdwest Fryslân. It is listed as a Rijksmonument, №39518.

== Description ==
De Snip is what the Dutch describe as a Grondzeiler. It is a two storey smock mill on a single storey base. There is no stage, the sails reaching almost to ground level. The mill is winded by tailpole and winch. The smock and cap are thatched. The sails are Common sails. They have a span of 15.30 metres (50 ft 2 in). The sails are carried on a cast iron windshaft, which was cast by Fabrikaat Sallandia, Zwolle, Overijssel. The windshaft carries the brake wheel which has 54 cogs. This drives the wallower (25 cogs) at the top of the upright shaft. At the bottom of the upright shaft there are two crown wheels The upper crown wheel, which has 30 cogs drives an Archimedes' screw via a crown wheel. The lower crown wheel, which has 29 cogs is carried on the axle of an Archimedes' screw, which is used to drain the polder. The axle of the screw is 34 centimetres (13 in) diameter and 4.07 metres (13 ft 4 in) long. The screw is 99 centimetres (3 ft 3 in) diameter. It is inclined at 27°. Each revolution of the screw lifts 226 litres (50 imp gal) of water.

== Public access ==
De Snip is open whenever it is working, or by appointment.
