= Winsum, Friesland =

Winsum
- Village
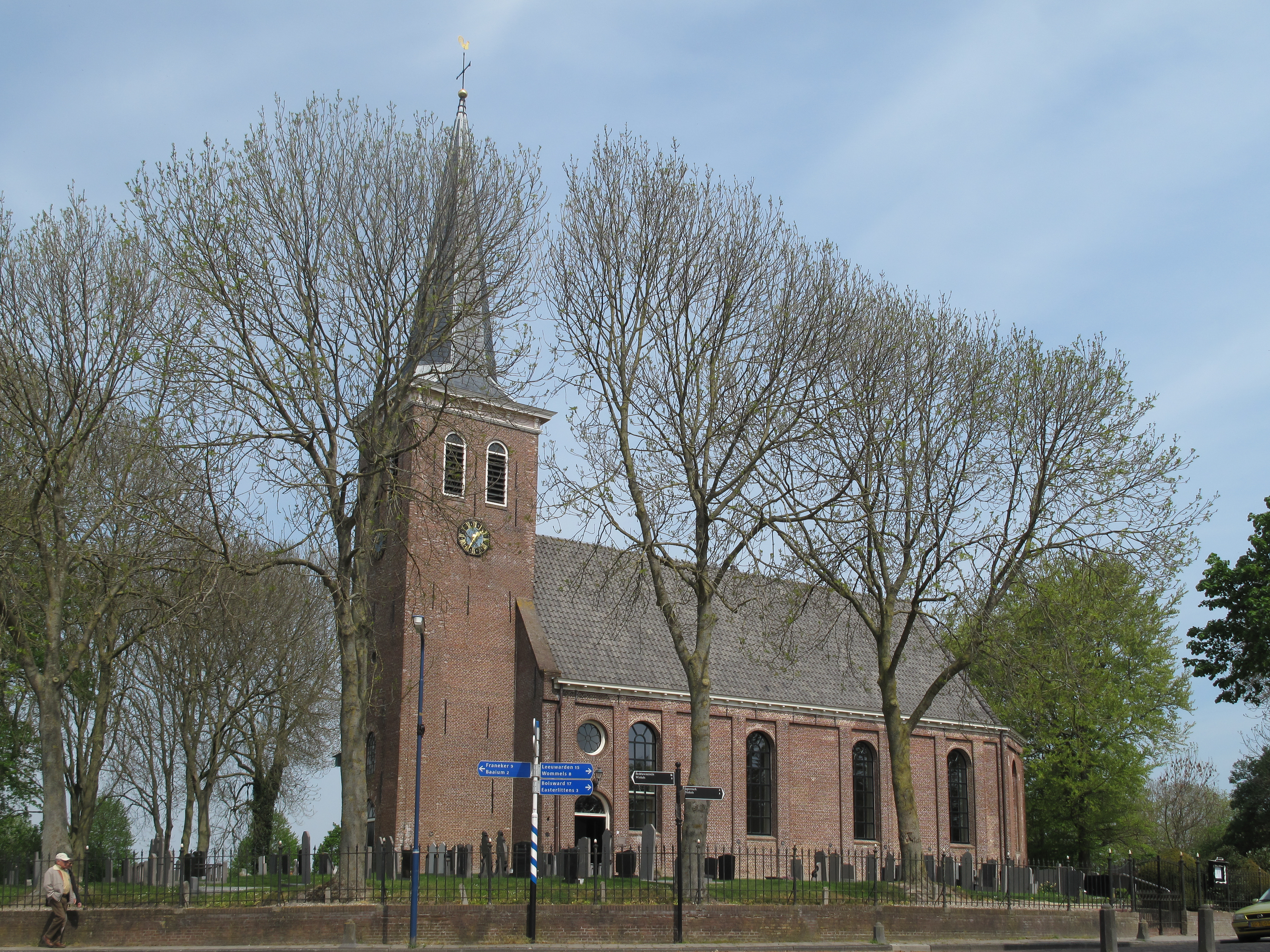
- Winsum church

- Flag Coat of arms

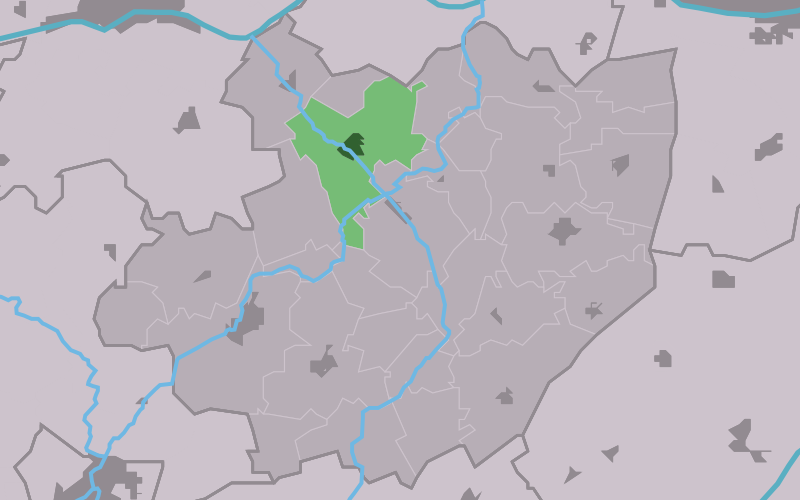
- Location in the former Littenseradiel municipality

- Location in the Netherlands Winsum (Netherlands)
- Country: Netherlands
- Province: Friesland
- Municipality: Waadhoeke

Area
  - Total: 8.71 km^{2} (3.36 sq mi)
- Elevation: 0.2 m (0.66 ft)

Population (2021)
  - Total: 1,025
  - Density: 118/km^{2} (305/sq mi)
- Time zone: UTC+1 (CET)
  - Summer (DST): UTC+2 (CEST)
- Postal code: 8831
- Dialing code: 0517
- Website: Official

Winsum (Dutch pronunciation: [ˈʋɪnsʏm]) is a village in Waadhoeke municipality in the province of Friesland, the Netherlands. It had a population of around 1,038 in January 2017.

== History ==
The village was first mentioned in the 13th century as Winshyum, and means "settlement of Winika (person)". Winsum developed in the middle ages. It is a terp (artificial living hill) village and one of the tallest, however it is not apparent due to the gentle slope. There was a second terp, however it was excavated in the late-19th century.

The Dutch Reformed church dates from the 15th or early-16th century. The tower has been built around 1880.

Winsum was home to 546 people in 1840. In 1897, the dairy factory Klimop opened in Winsum. It was in operation until 1939. Only the chimney remains.

The windmill Langwert was built in 1974 as a replacement of an 1863 windmill which burnt down on 13 March 1974. It is a polder mill to drain the excess water from the polder. In 2011, it was damaged in a storm. Since 2014, it is once again in operation.

Until 2018, the village was part of the Littenseradiel municipality and before 1984 it belonged to Baarderadeel municipality.

== Notable people ==
- Jo Meynen (1901–1980), politician, minister of war and member of the Steering Committee of the Bilderberg Group

== Gallery ==
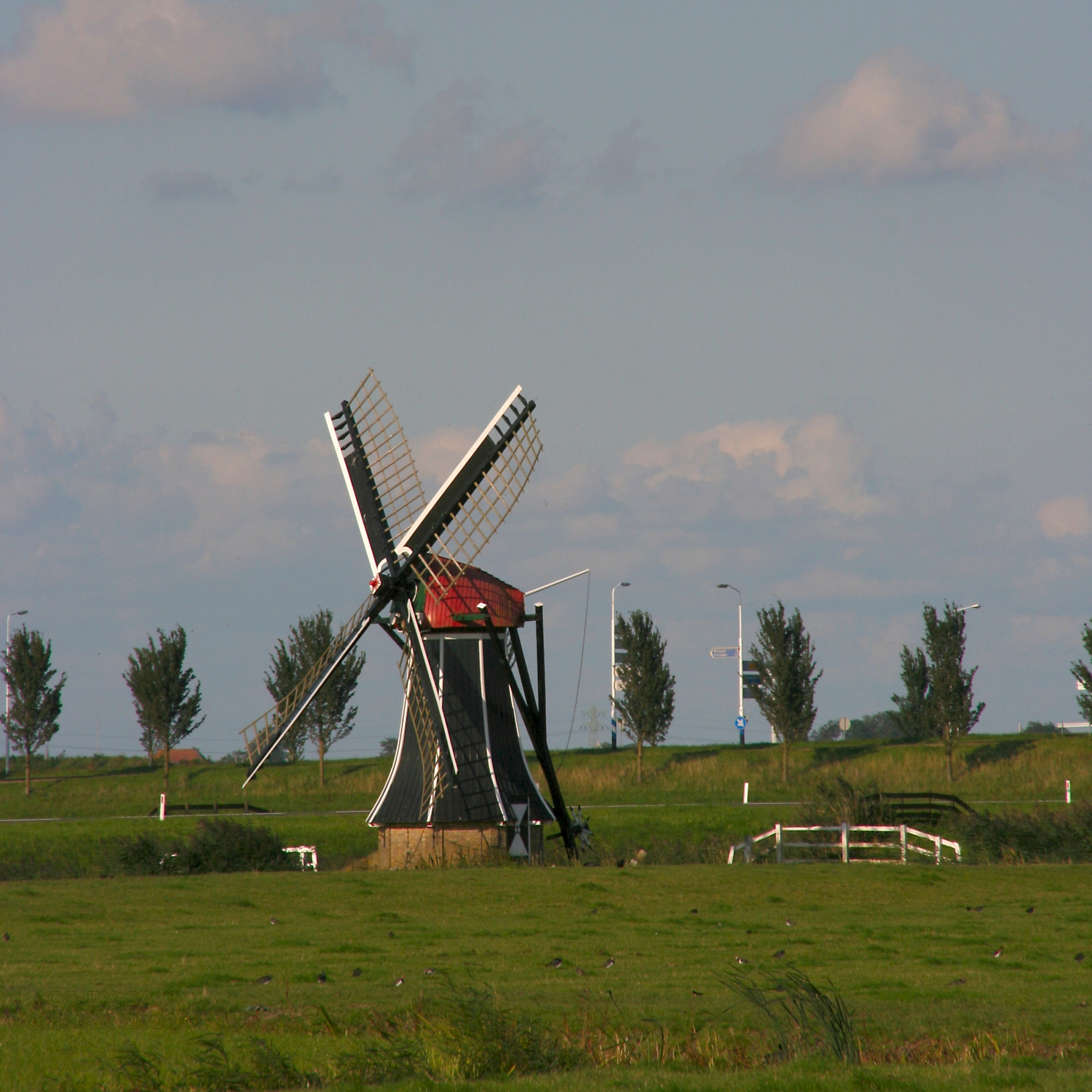
Langwert Mill

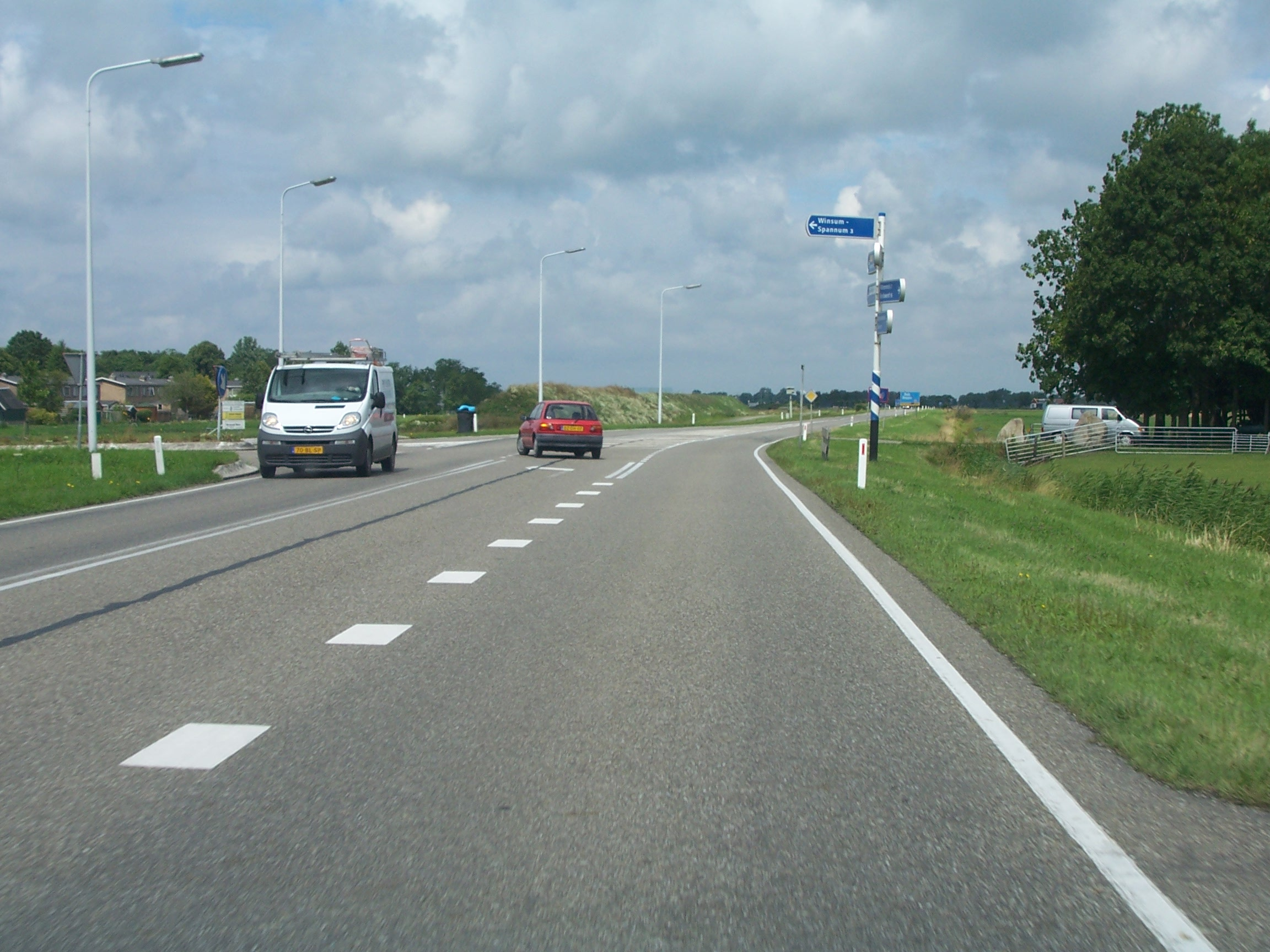
Turn left for Winsum

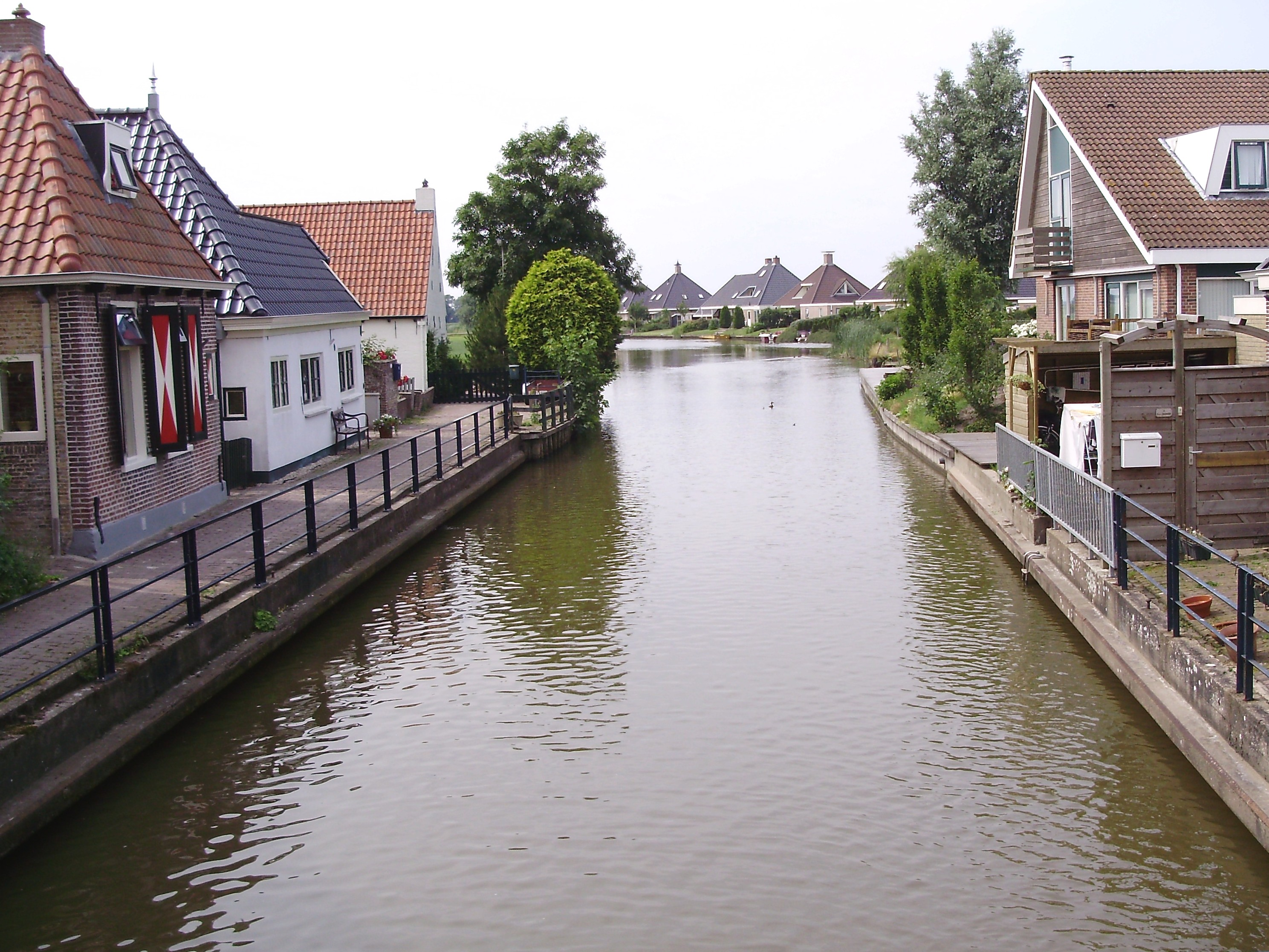
Canal view

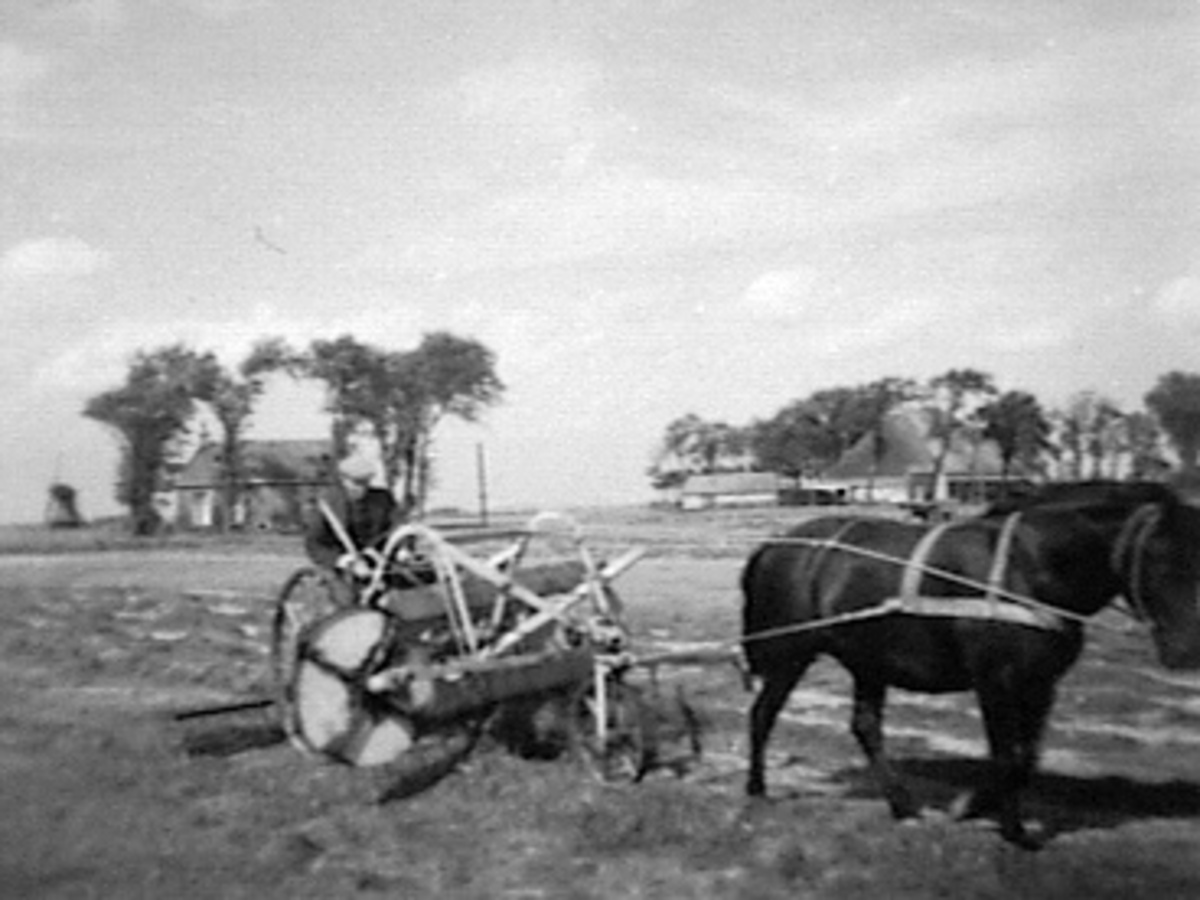
Farmer plowing with horse (unknown date)
