= Achtkarspelen =

- Municipality
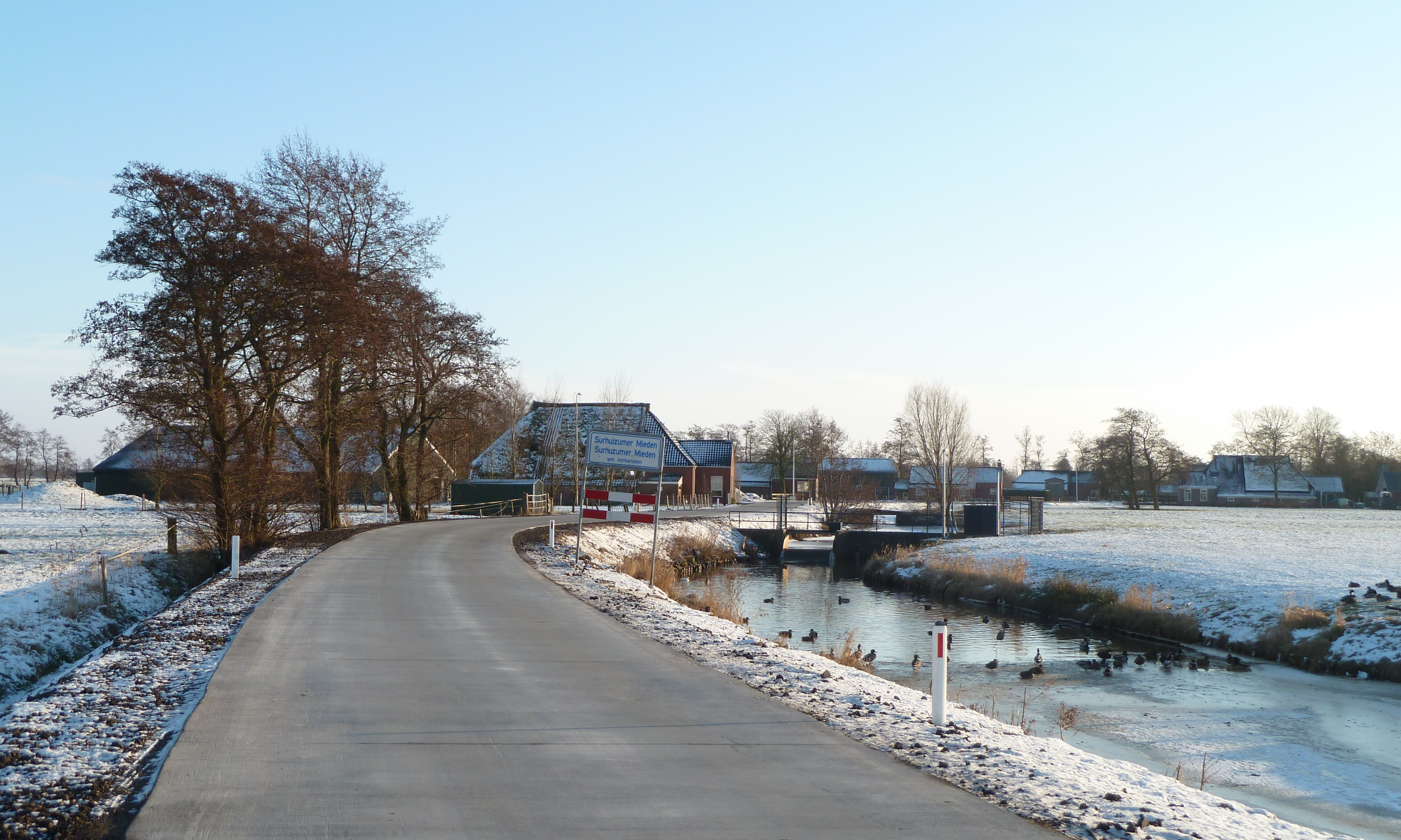
- Road into Surhuizum

- Flag Coat of arms

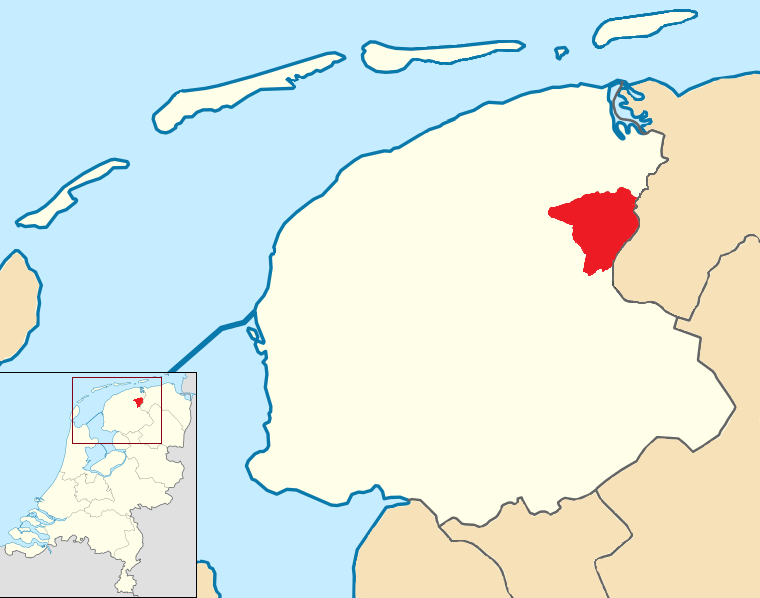
- Location in Friesland
- Coordinates: 53°15′N 6°9′E
- Country: Netherlands
- Province: Friesland

Government
  - Body: Municipal council
  - Mayor: Jouke Douwe de Vries

Area
  - Total: 103.98 km^{2} (40.15 sq mi)
  - Land: 102.23 km^{2} (39.47 sq mi)
  - Water: 1.75 km^{2} (0.68 sq mi)
- Elevation: 2 m (6.6 ft)

Population (January 2021)
  - Total: 27,900
  - Density: 273/km^{2} (710/sq mi)
- Time zone: UTC+1 (CET)
  - Summer (DST): UTC+2 (CEST)
- Postcode: Parts of 9000 range
- Area code: 0511, 0512
- Website: www.achtkarspelen.nl

Achtkarspelen (Dutch pronunciation: [ɑxtˈkɑrspələ(n)]) is a municipality in the province of Friesland in the Northern Netherlands. In 2021, it had a population of 27,900.

== History ==
The name Achtkarspelen, literally meaning "eight parishes", is derived from the original eight parishes within the grietenij, namely: Augustinusga, Buitenpost (the capital), Drogeham, De Kooten, Kortwoude, Lutkepost, Surhuizum and Twijzel. Achtkarspelen held a separate status within Friesland for many years. In the Middle Ages Achtkarspelen fell under the Bishopric of Münster, meanwhile the rest of Friesland was a part of the Bishopric of Utrecht.

The grietenij Achtkarspelen became a municipality in 1851 as a result of the Municipality Act of Minister of the Interior Johan Rudolph Thorbecke.

== Population centres ==
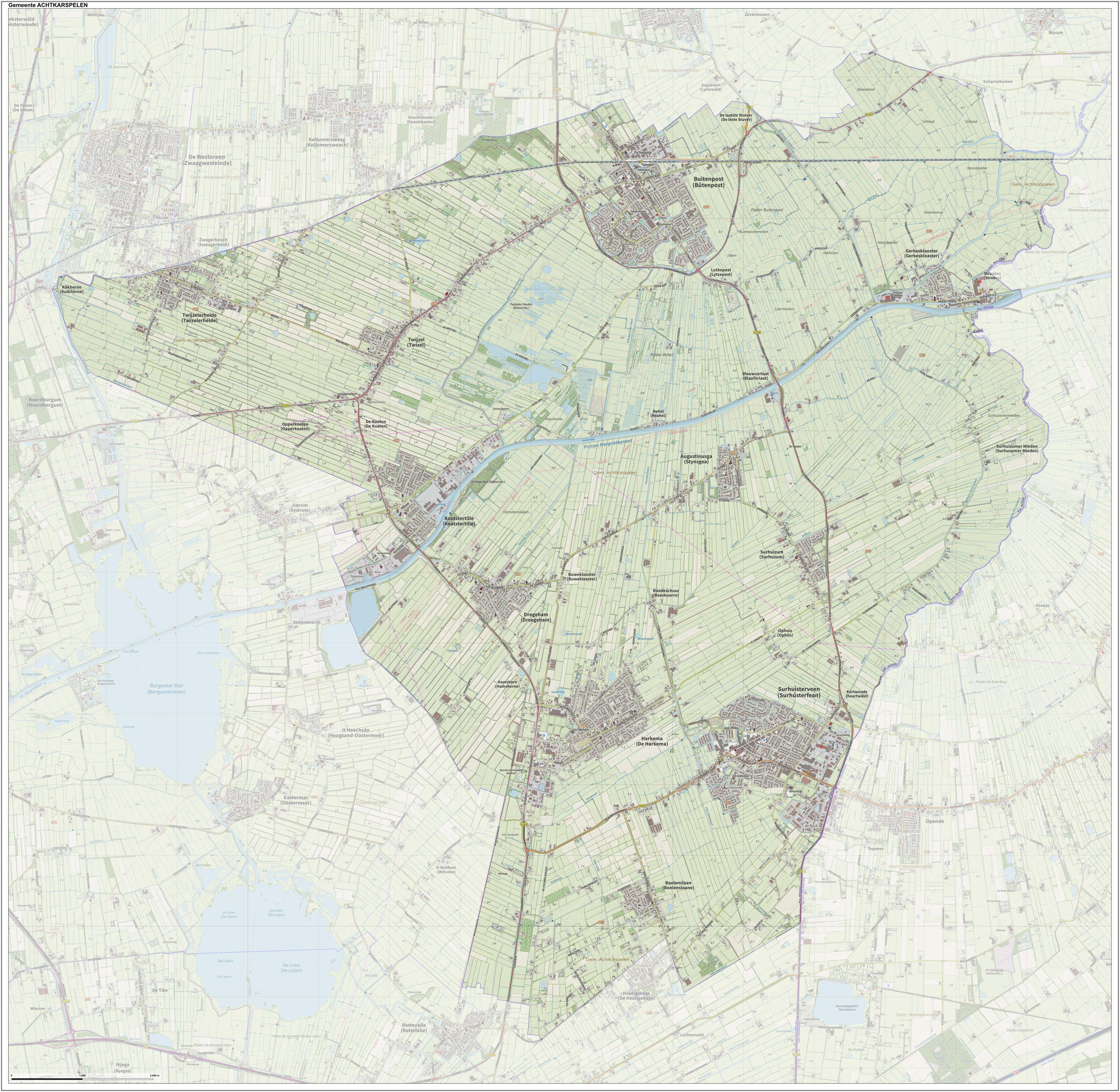
Topographic map of Achtkarspelen, June 2015

The administrative centre in the municipality is Buitenpost.

Dutch name	West Frisian name	Population
Augustinusga	Stynsgea	1332
Boelenslaan	Boelensloane	1145
Buitenpost	Bûtenpost	5785
Drogeham	Droegeham	1751
Gerkesklooster-Stroobos	Gerkeskleaster-Strobos	1140
Harkema	De Harkema	4235
Kootstertille	Koatstertille	2595
Surhuisterveen	Surhústerfean	5810
Surhuizum	Surhuzum	1371
Twijzel	Twizel	1093
Twijzelerheide	Twizelerheide	1889

== Notable people ==
- Derk Holman (1916 in Buitenpost – 1982 in Groningen) sculptor and ceramist
- Louw de Graaf (1930 in Kootstertille – 2020) politician and trade union leader.
- Gerriet Postma (1932 in Twijzelerheide – 2009) painter
- Johannes Lützen Bouma (1934 in Twijzelerheide – 2025) economist and academic
- David Porcelijn (born 1947 in Achtkarspelen) composer and conductor
- Joop Atsma (born 1956 in Surhuisterveen) politician and sport administrator.
- Meindert Talma (born 1968 in Surhuisterveen) lo-fi singer and keyboardist
- Oedo Kuipers (born 1989 in Stroobos) singer and actor in musical theatre

== Gallery ==
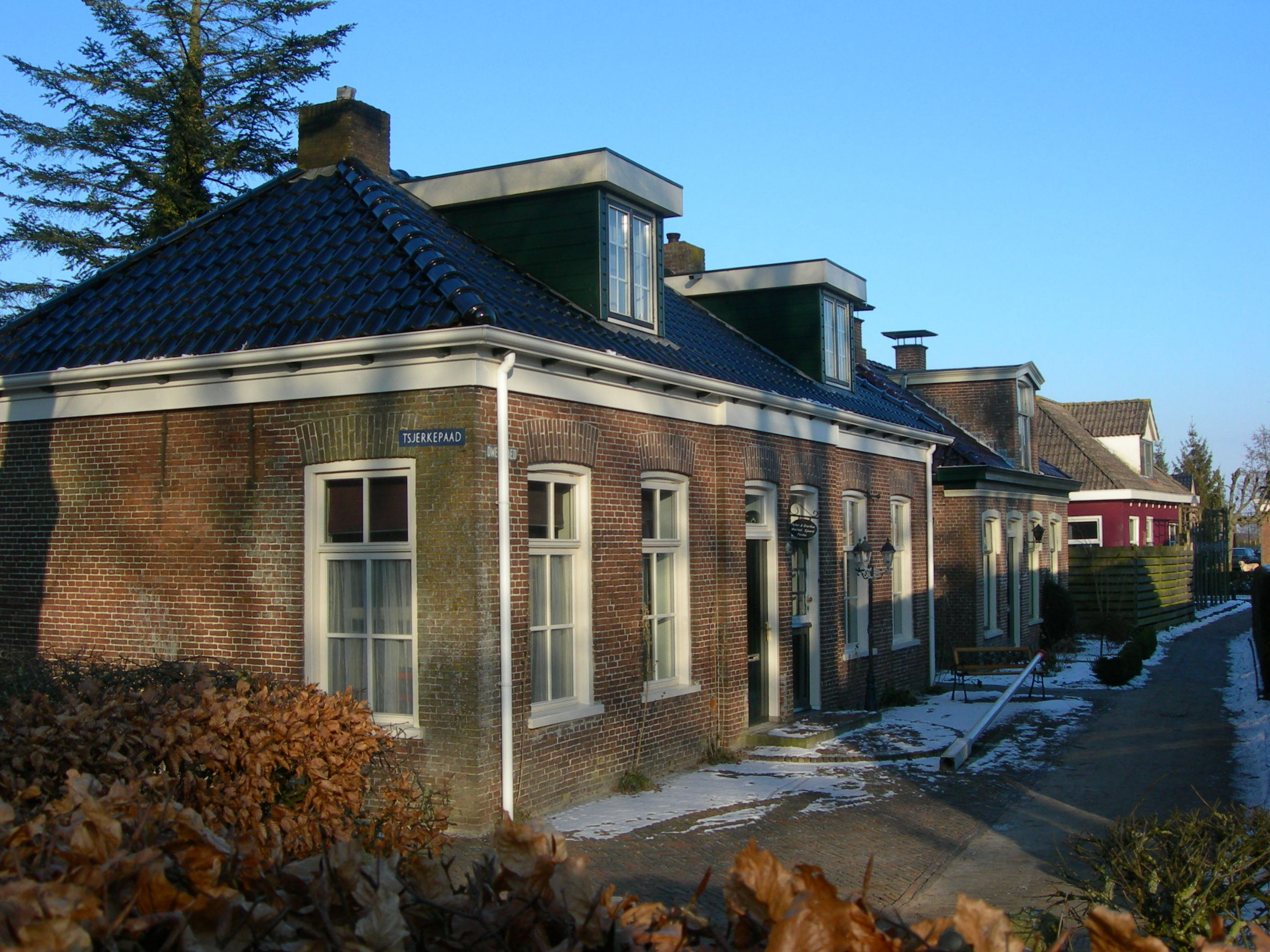
Augustinusga Dwarsreed

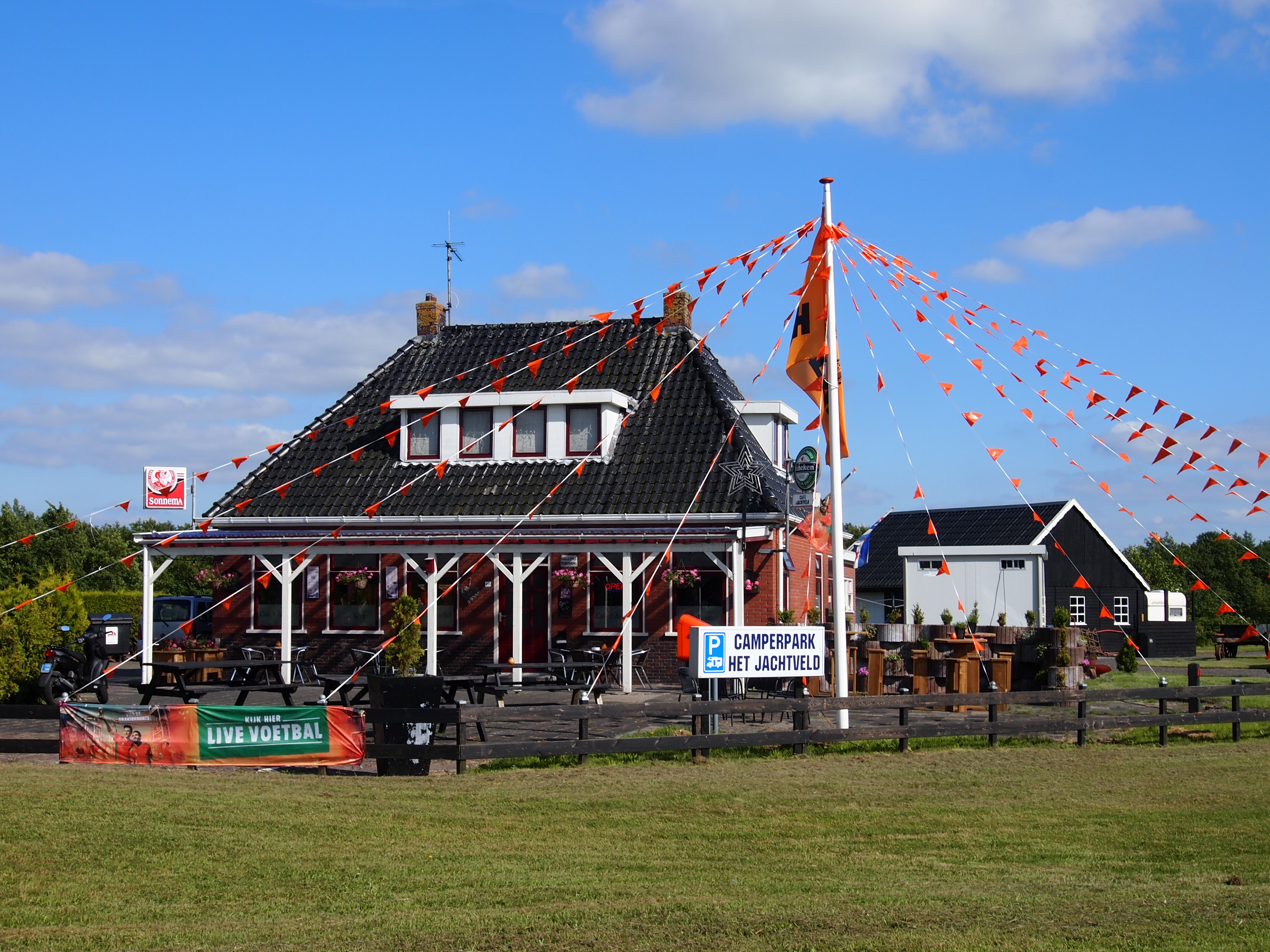
Boelenslaan Oranje gekte

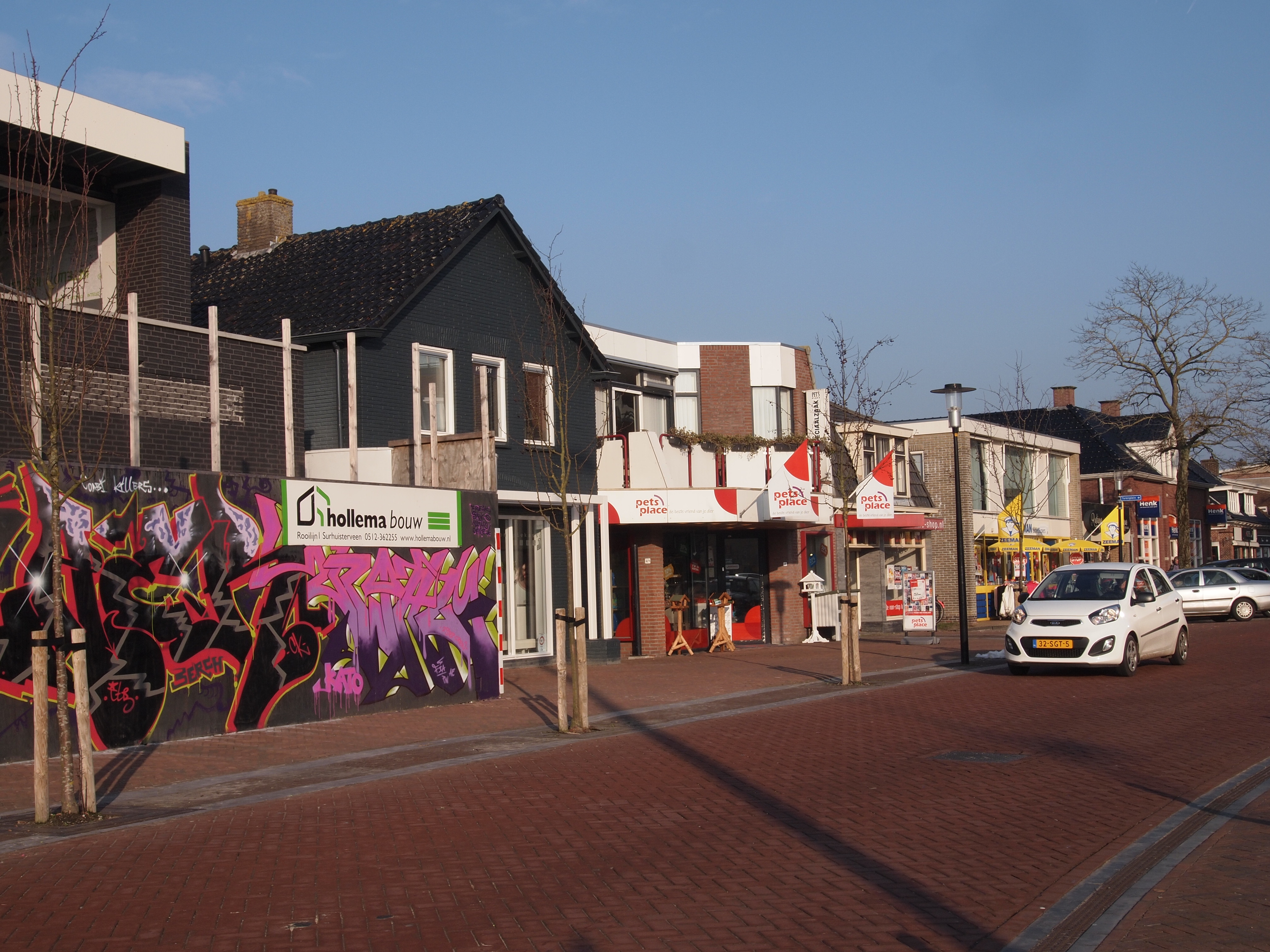
Begin van de Kolk, Surhuisterveen

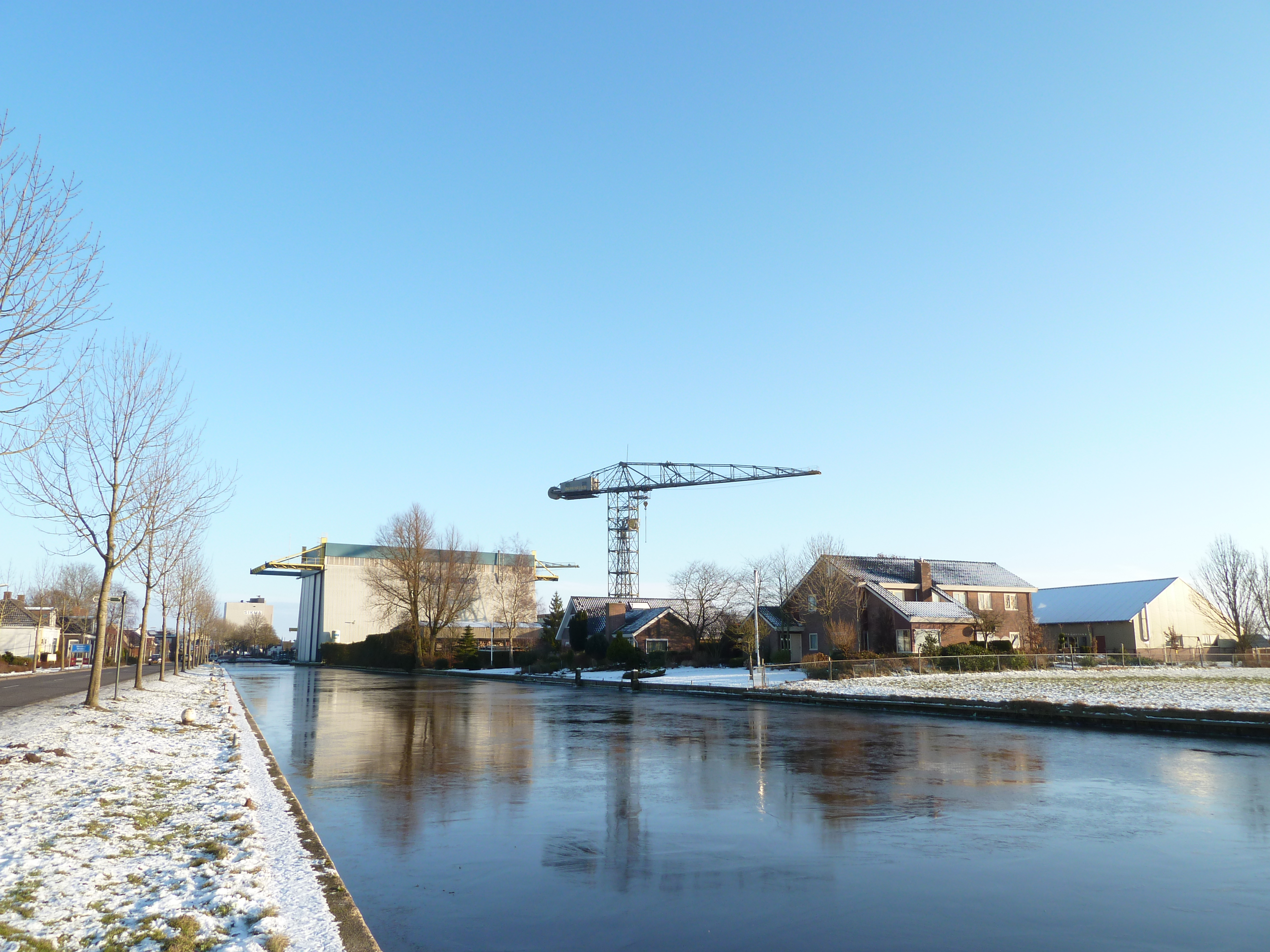
The Hoendiep near Stroobos
