= Surhuisterveen =

Surhuisterveen Surhústerfean (West Frisian)
- Village
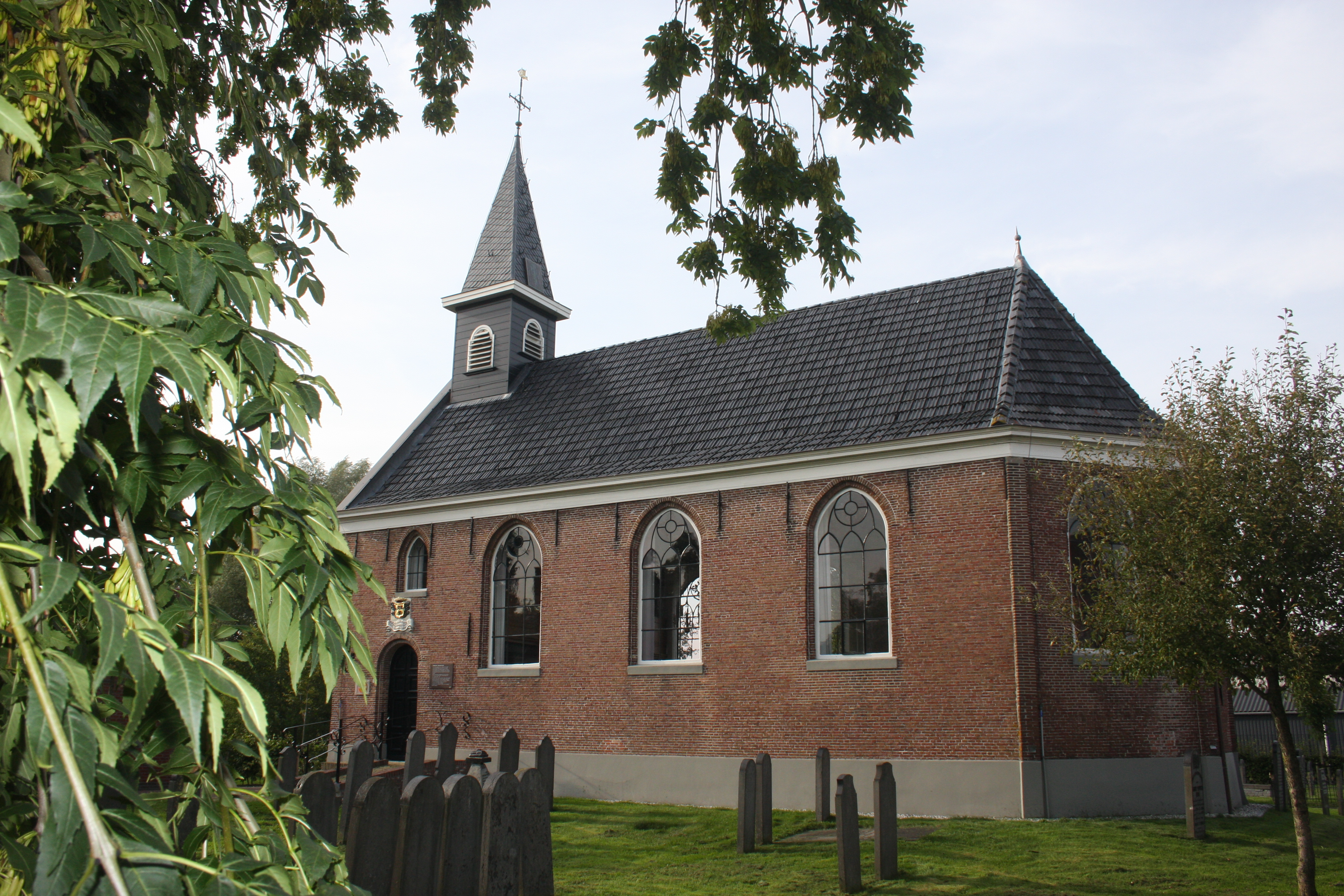
- Surhuisterveen Church

- Flag Coat of arms

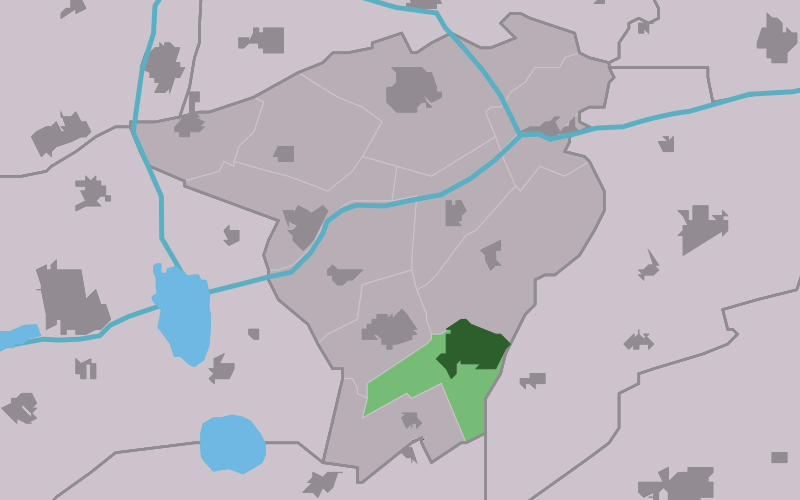
- Location in Achtkarspelen municipality

- Location in the Netherlands Surhuisterveen (Netherlands)
- Country: Netherlands
- Province: Friesland
- Municipality: Achtkarspelen

Area
  - Total: 7.58 km^{2} (2.93 sq mi)
- Elevation: 2 m (6.6 ft)

Population (2021)
  - Total: 6,050
  - Density: 798/km^{2} (2,070/sq mi)
- Time zone: UTC+1 (CET)
  - Summer (DST): UTC+2 (CEST)
- Postal code: 9231
- Dialing code: 0512

Surhuisterveen (West Frisian: Surhústerfean) is the largest of the 12 villages of the municipality of Achtkarspelen, in the province of Friesland, the Netherlands. As of 1 January 2017, Surhuisterveen had a population of 5,929.

== General information ==
The village was first mentioned in 1603 as Surhustera feen. Surhuisterveen began to develop at the end of the 16th century as peat-excavators and boatmen built their homes in the area. The name Surhuisterveen refers to the time of the peat-colonies, and means "the peat-bogs of Surhuizum". The earliest settlers were mainly Mennonites. Surhuizum is another constituent village of Achtkarspelen, which is significantly smaller, but also significantly older than Surhuisterveen. After World War II, Surhuisterveen became a regional centre with an emphasis on retail.

The Protestant Church was built in 1685. The Mennonite Church dates from 1801. The grist mill Koartwâld or Feanstermoune was built in 1864. In 1907, an electro motor was installed. The windmill sail was damaged during a storm in 1946, and not repaired. The wind mill started to become a derelict, and only a ruin remained. In 1990, a restoration project started, and the wind mill was recommissioned in 1995. Surhuisterveen was home to 1,289 people in 1840.

The Centrumcross Surhuisterveen is a cyclo-cross event organized in the village. There is a restored windmill in the village, Koartwâld. The source of the Lauwers river, as a small stream, is located southeast of the village.

== Gallery ==
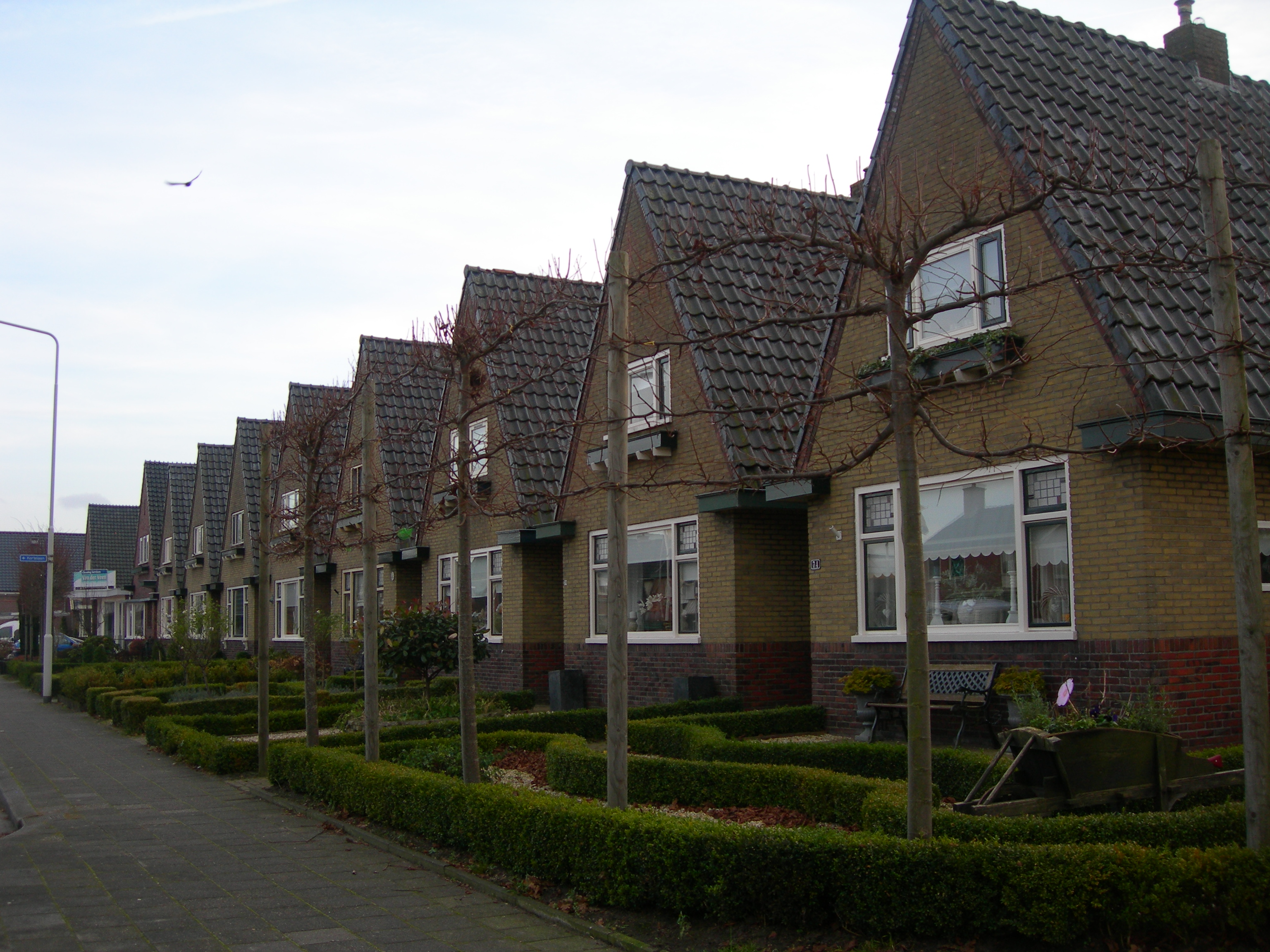
Row of houses

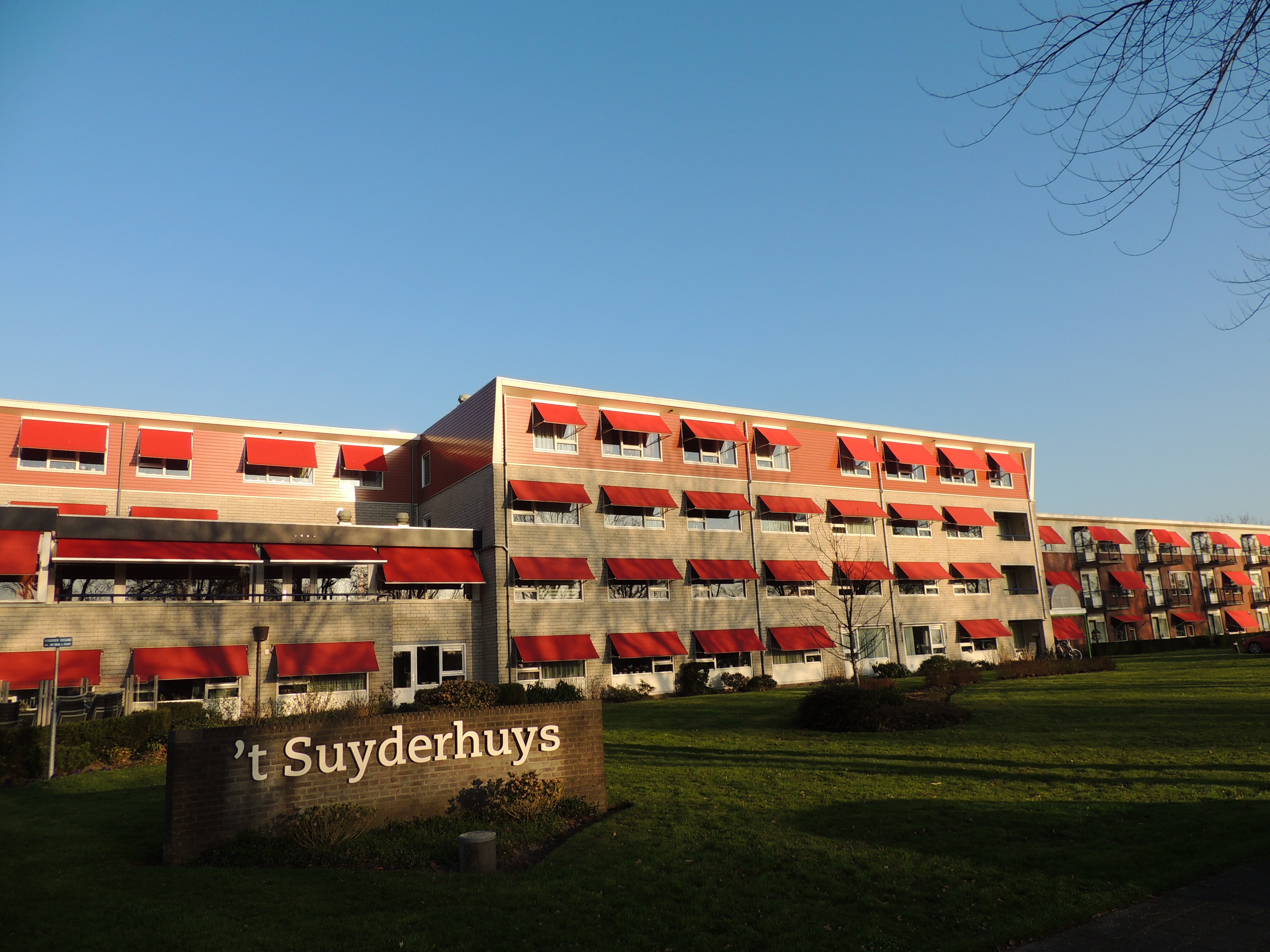
Nursing home

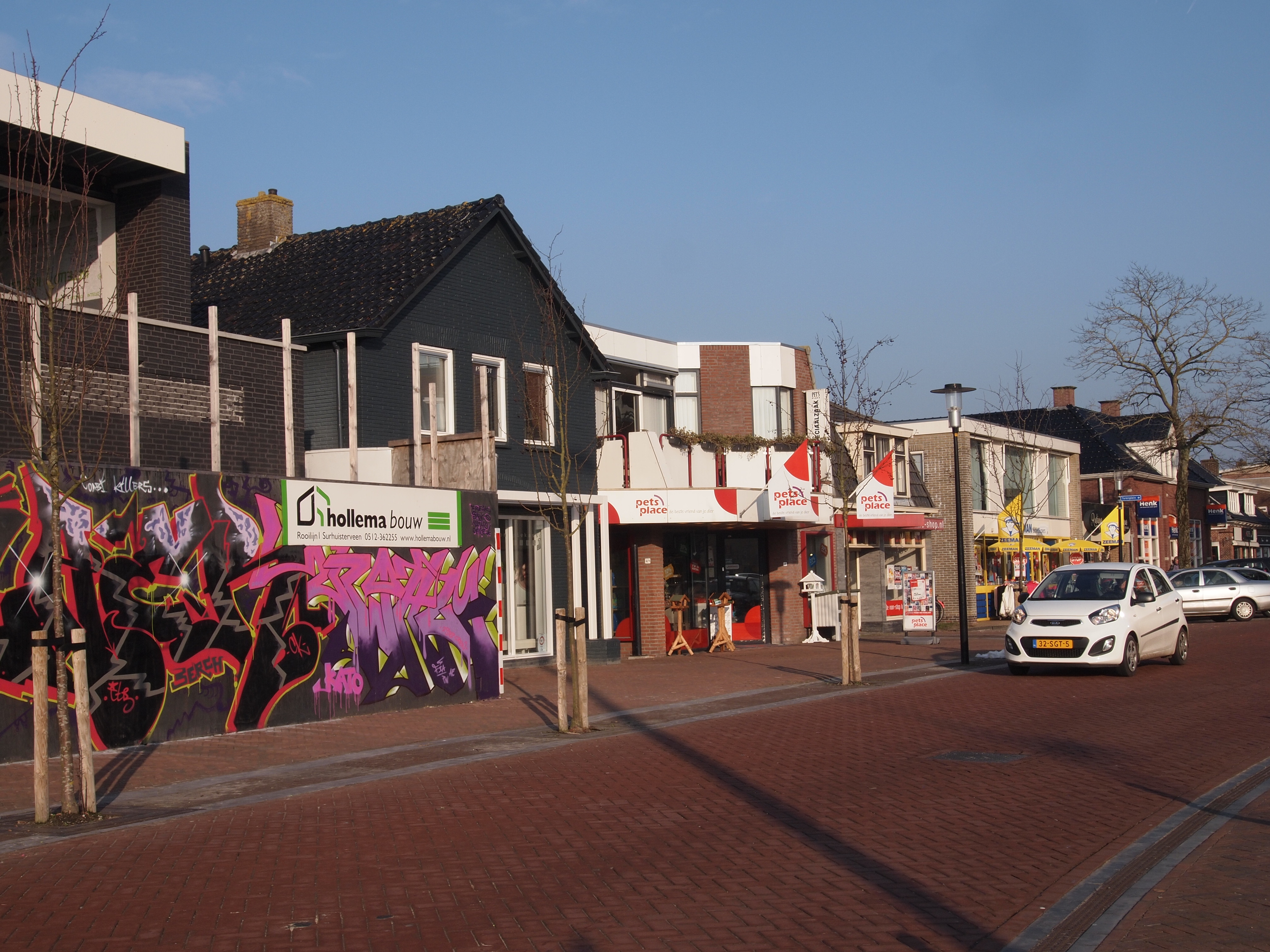
Shopping street

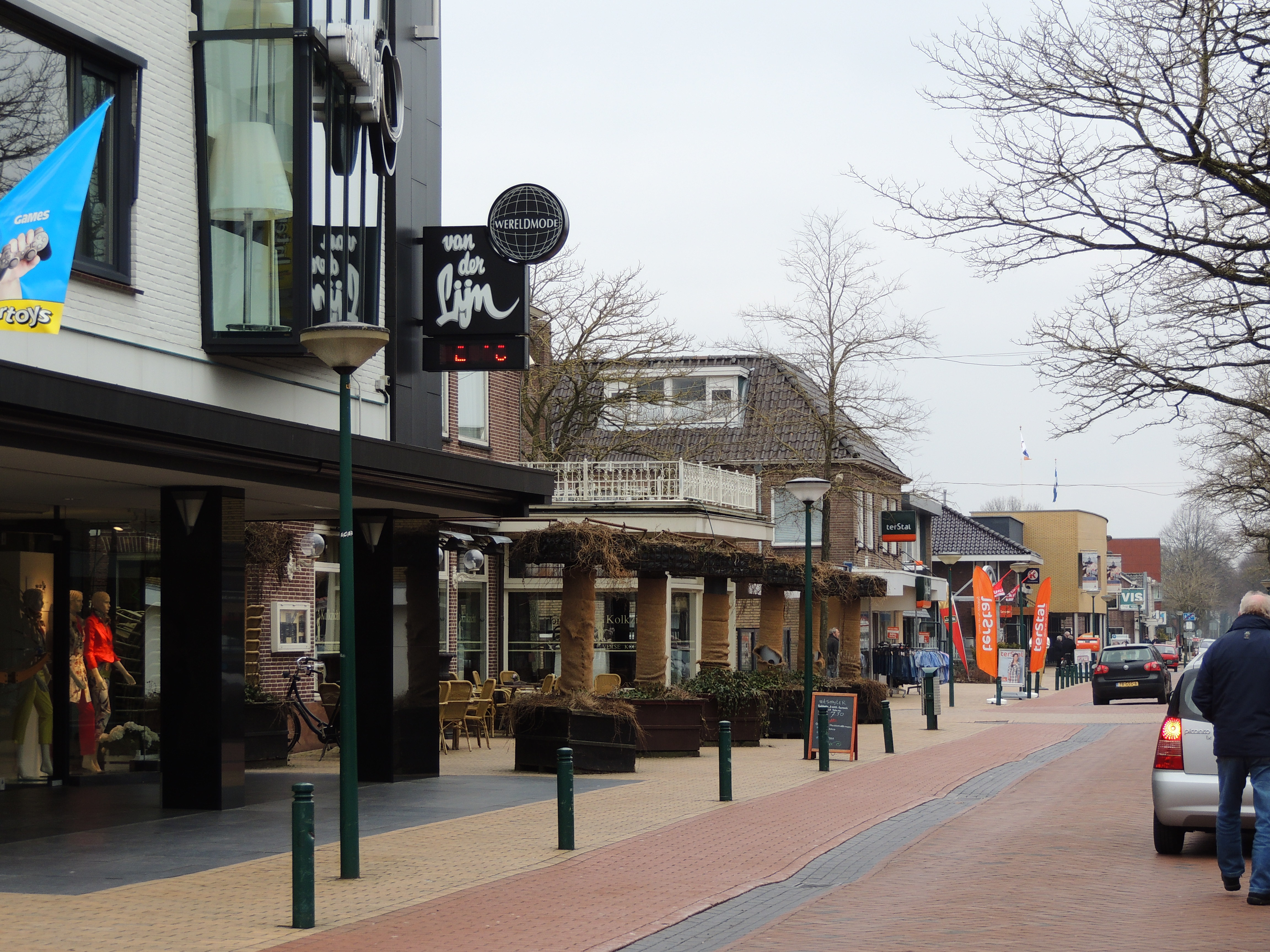
Centre of Surhuisterveen

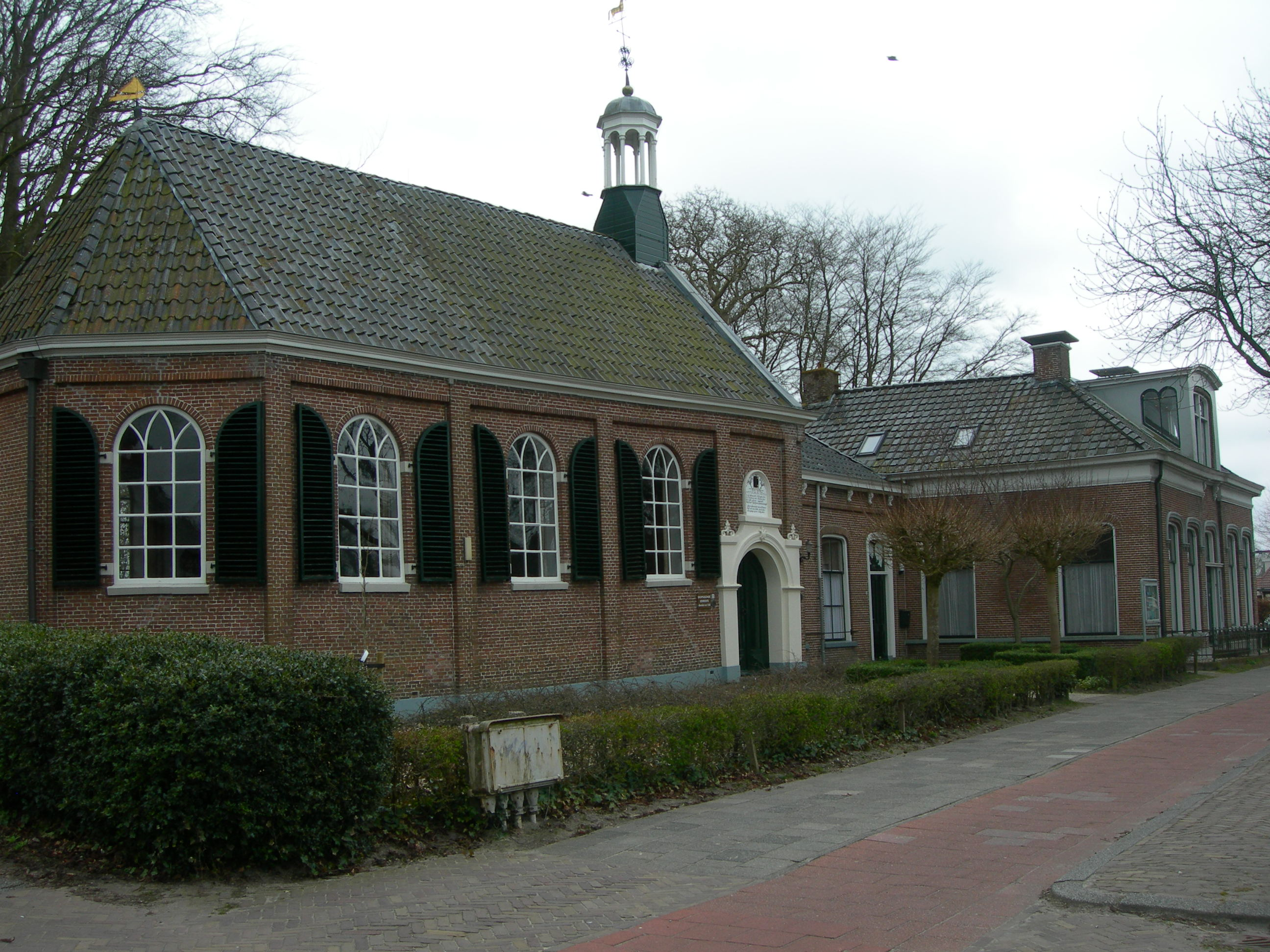
Mennonite church

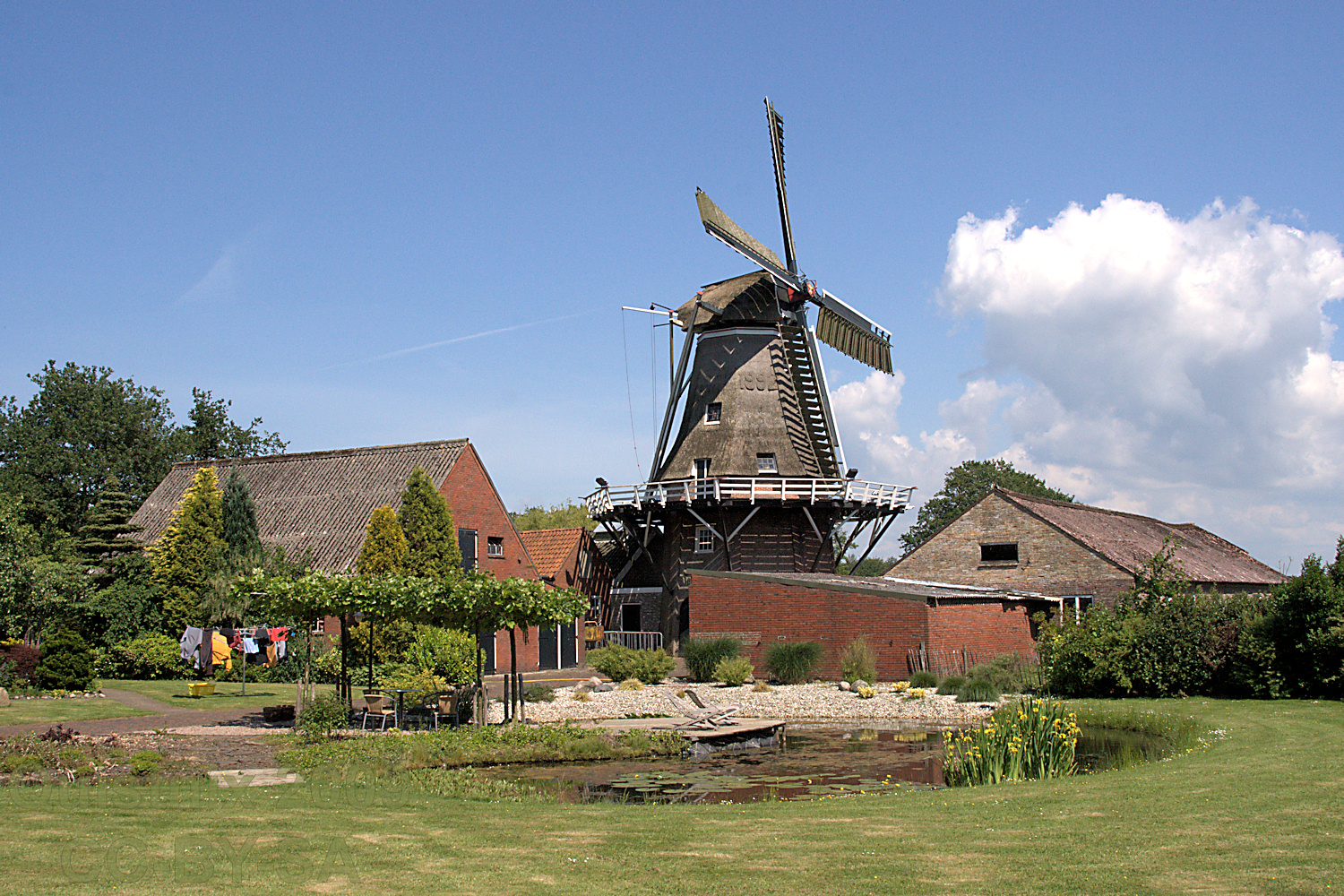
Windmill Koartwald

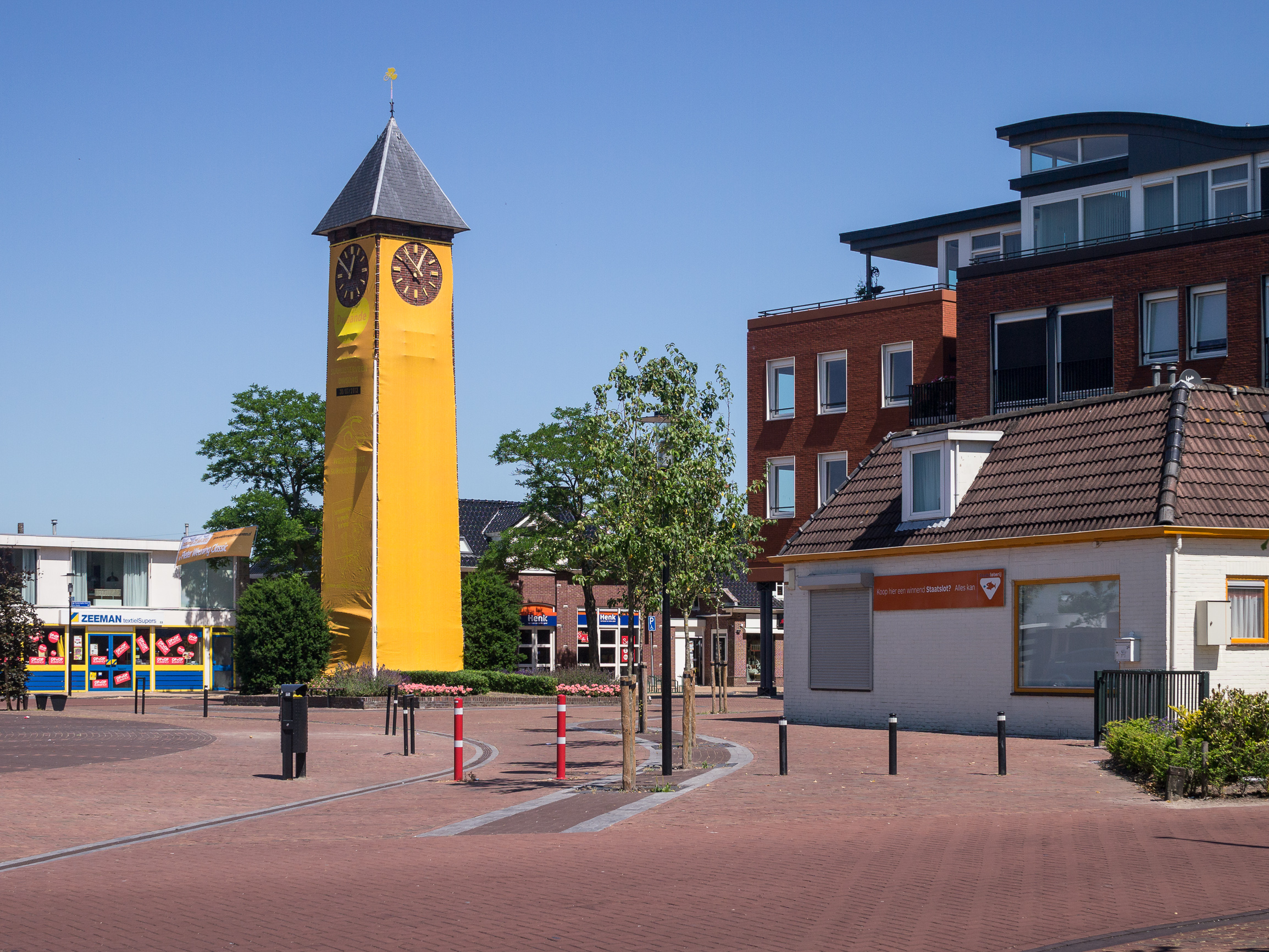
Dressed up clock tower

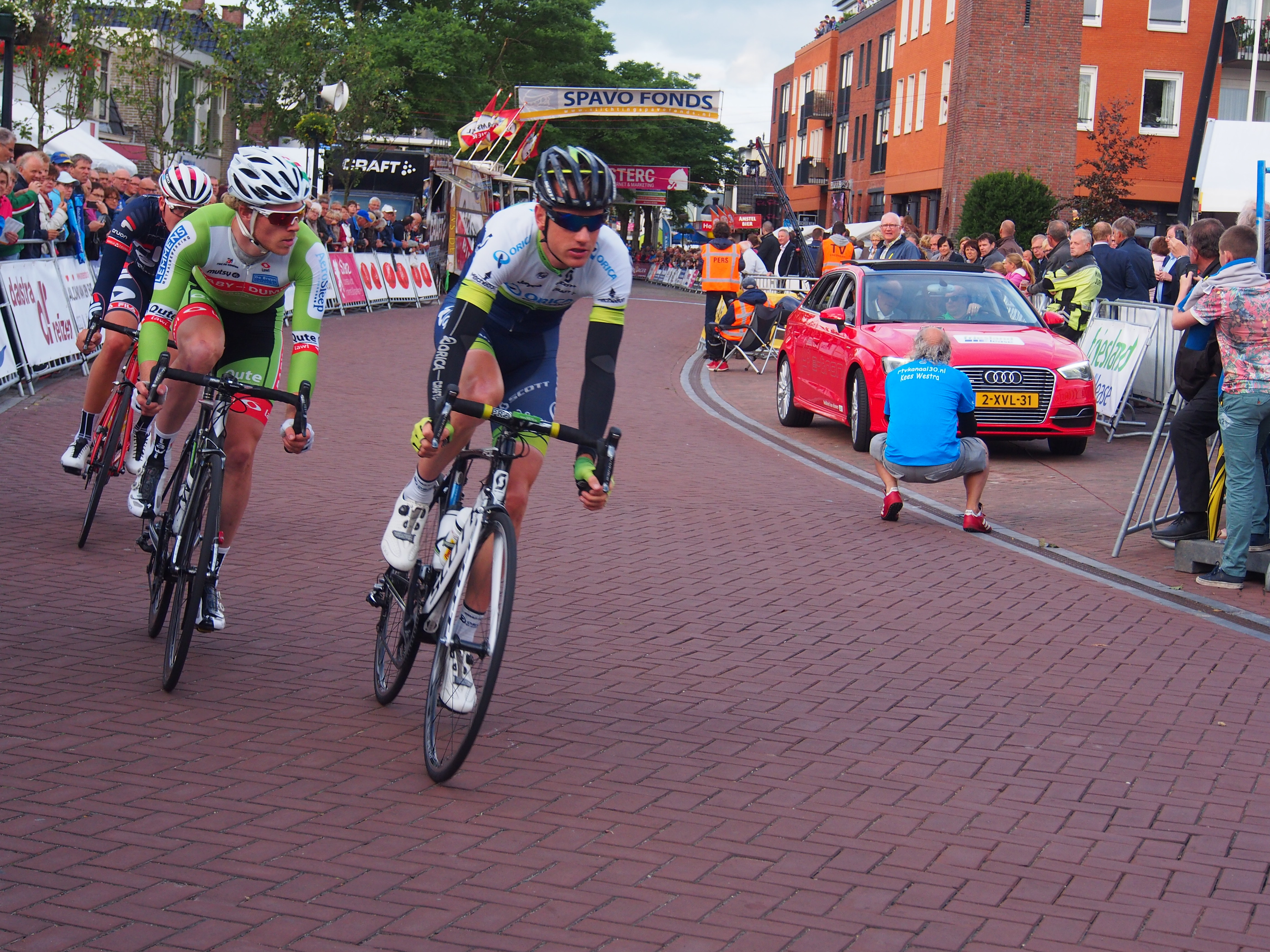
Centrumcross
