= Gerkesklooster =

Gerkesklooster Gerkeskleaster (West Frisian)
- Village
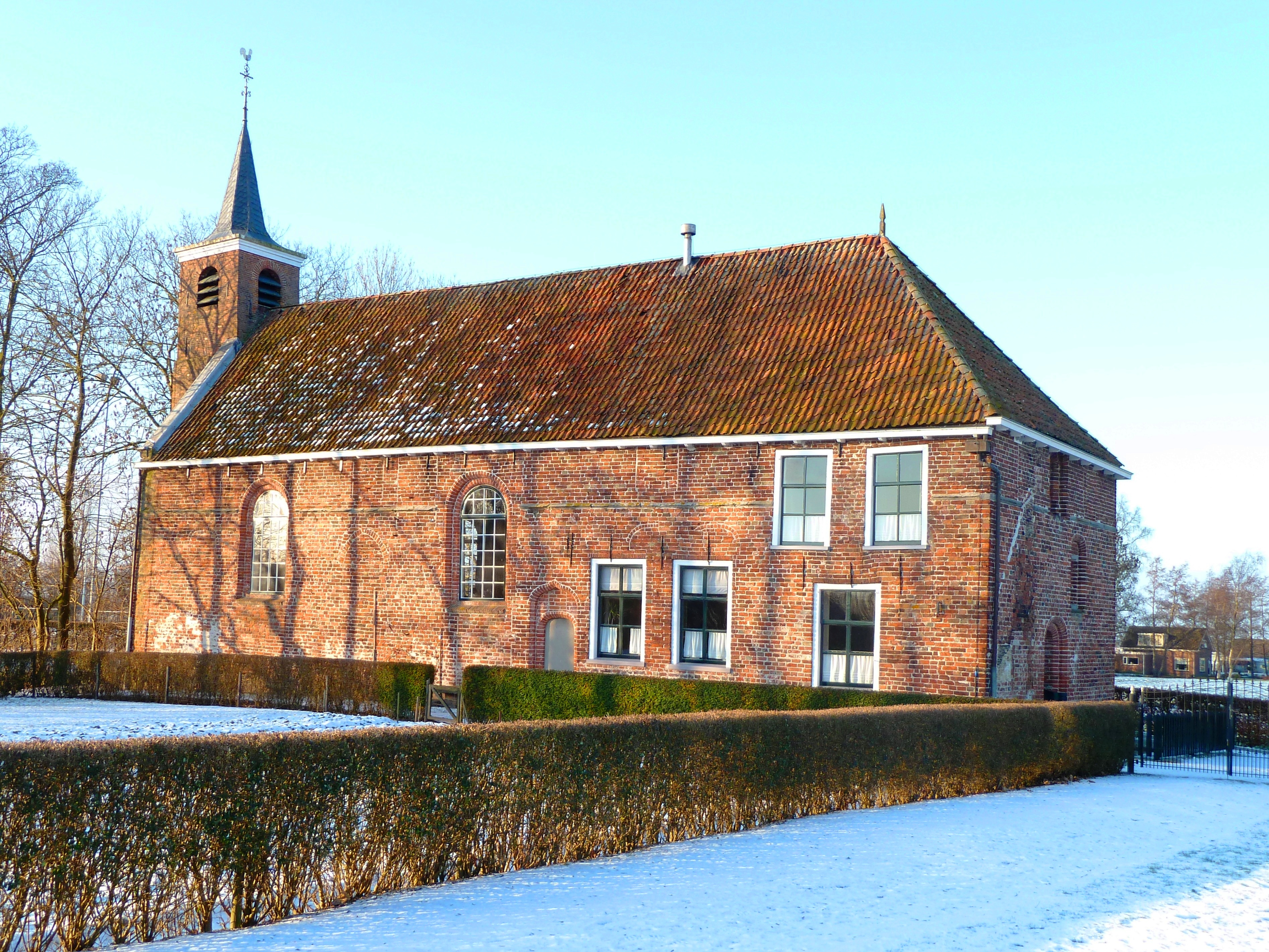
- Gerkesklooster Reformed Church

- Flag Coat of arms

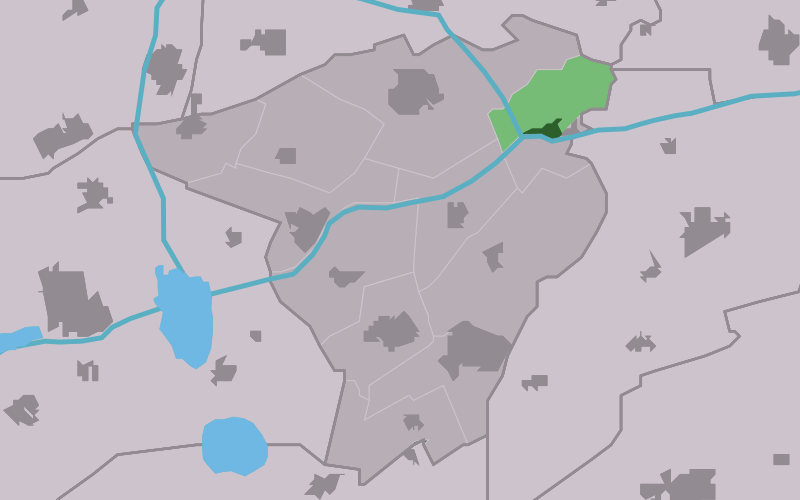
- Location in Achtkarspelen municipality

- Location in the Netherlands Gerkesklooster (Netherlands)
- Coordinates: 53°14′N 6°12′E
- Country: Netherlands
- Province: Friesland
- Municipality: Achtkarspelen

Area
  - Total: 5.70 km^{2} (2.20 sq mi)
- Elevation: 0.7 m (2.3 ft)

Population (2021)
  - Total: 760
  - Density: 130/km^{2} (350/sq mi)
- Time zone: UTC+1 (CET)
  - Summer (DST): UTC+2 (CEST)
- Postal code: 9873
- Dialing code: 0512

Gerkesklooster (West Frisian: Gerkeskleaster) is a village in Achtkarspelen in the province of Friesland, the Netherlands.

It forms, together with Stroobos, the double village Gerkesklooster-Stroobos. The double village had a population of around 1144 in 2017, with 812 in Gerkesklooster and 332 in Stroobos.

== History ==
The village was first mentioned in 1240 as "in Wigarathorpe1", and in 1393, it was called Gherkescloester, meaning "monastery of Gerke". In 1240, Gerke Harkema founded monastery Jeruzalem in the village. In 1580, during the Reformation, the monastery was demolished except for the brewery which was turned into a church. The current serves as the Protestant church, and has been extensively modified.

After a sluice was built in the canal from Dokkum to Groningen, a second settlement developed called Stroobos. There is an American wind mill from 1923 near the village which serves as a pumping station to remove excess water from the polder. In 1840, Gerkesklooster was home to 342 people. The settlement of Stroobos used to be divided between Friesland and Groningen. In 1993, the entire village was transferred to Friesland.

== Gallery ==
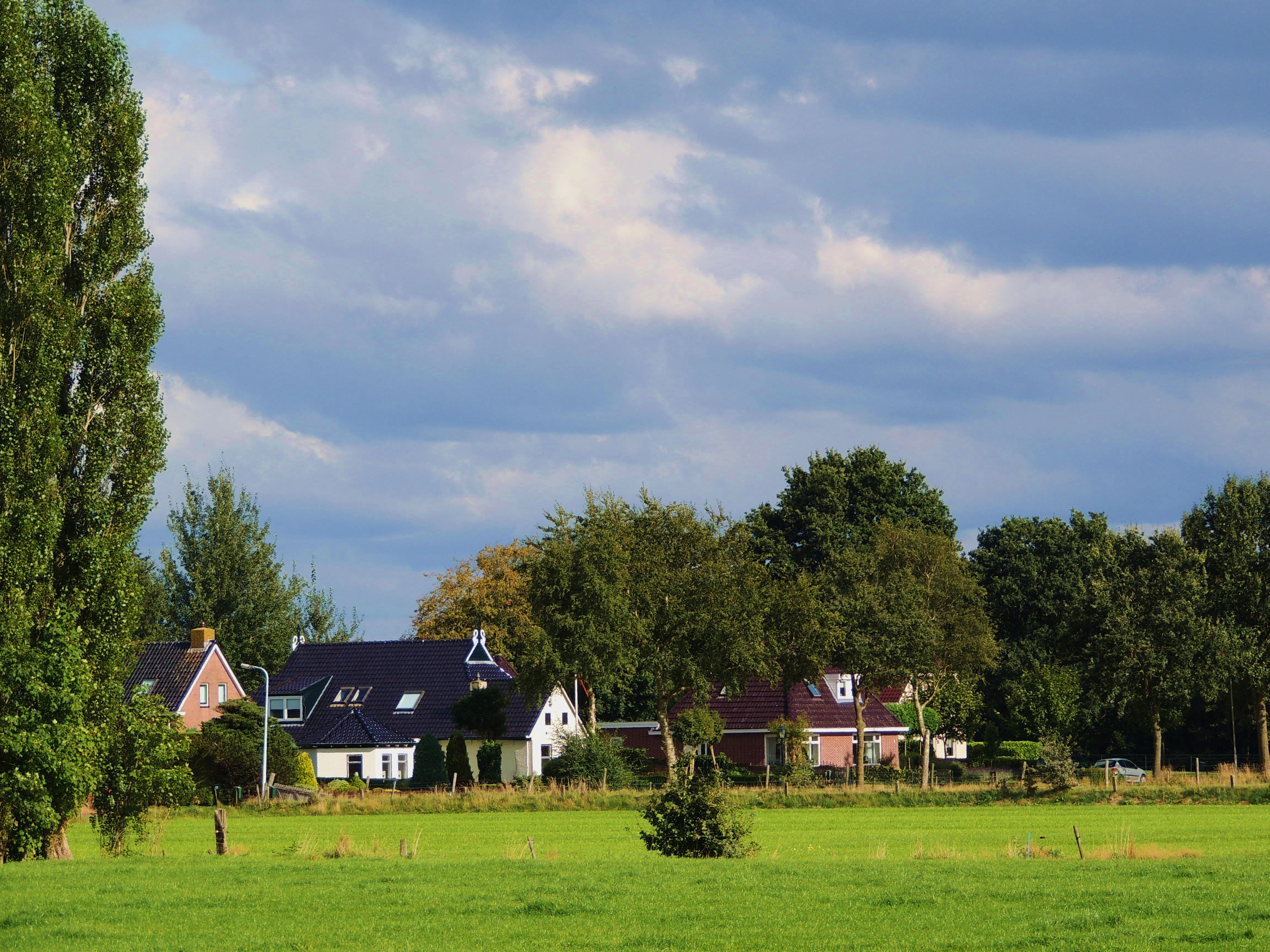
Houses of Gerkesklooster

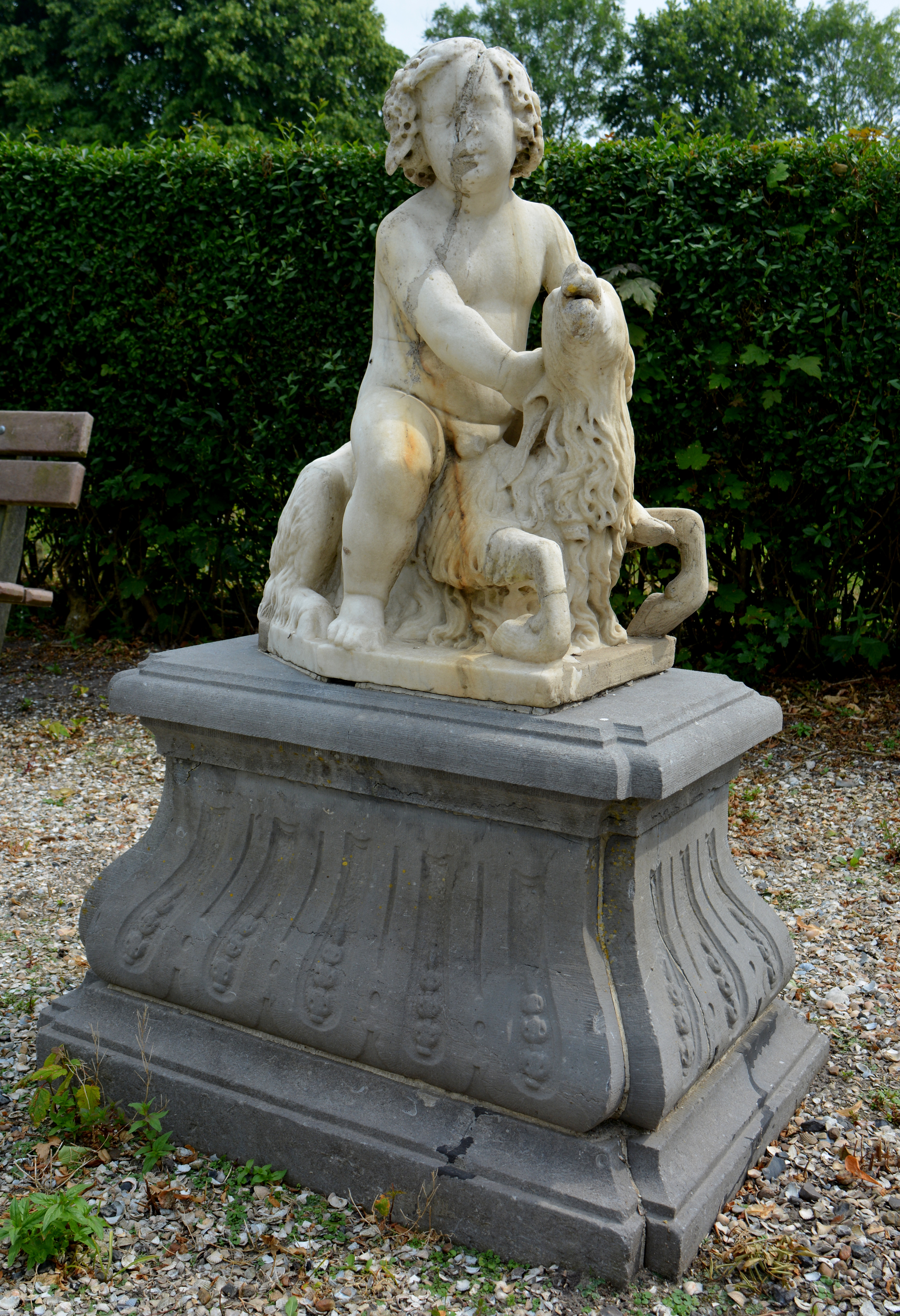
Marble statue near the Dutch Reformed Church

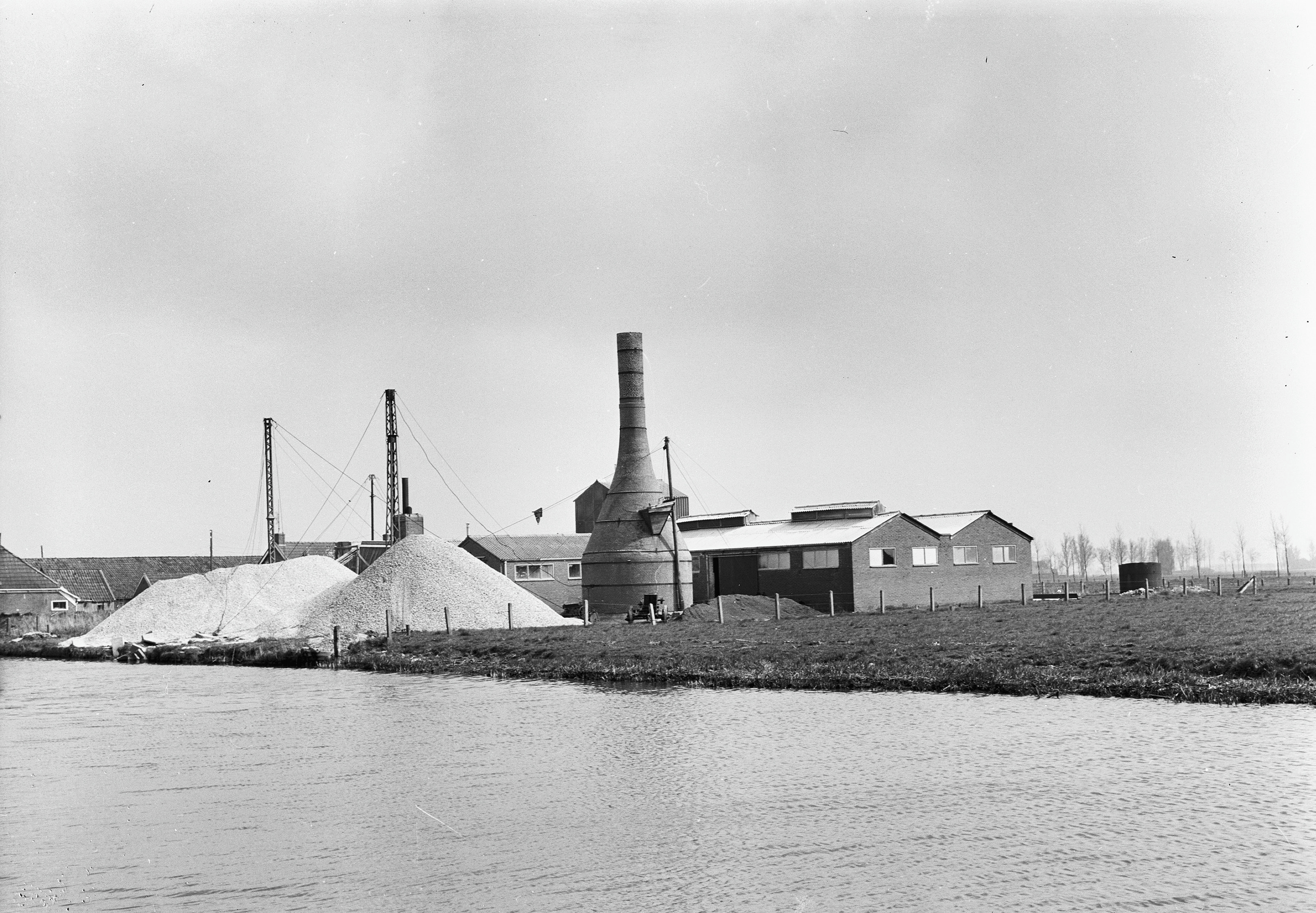
Lime kiln near the canal

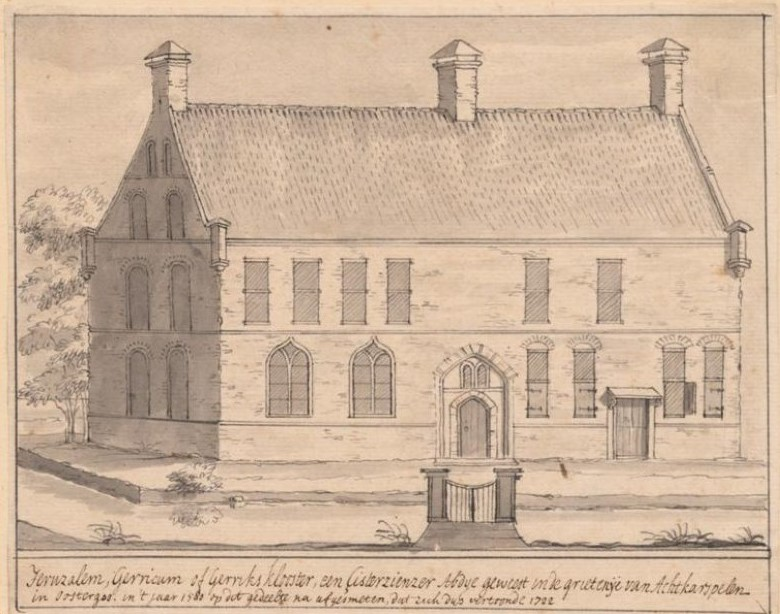
Drawing of monastery Jeruzalem (1722)
