= Oedo Kuipers =

Dutch musical singer and actor

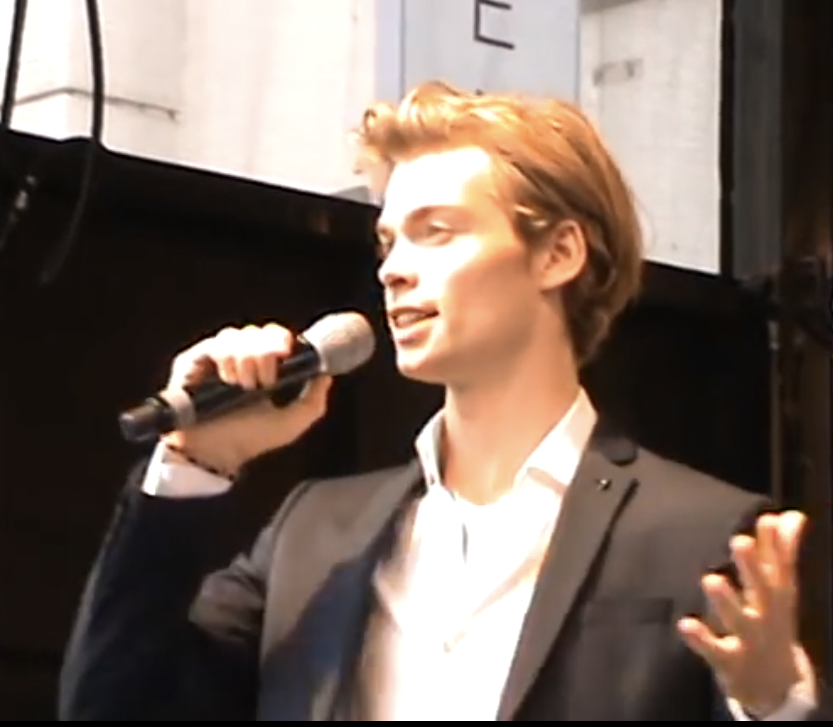
- Born: November 11, 1989 (age 36); Stroobos, Netherlands
- Education: Fontys University of Applied Sciences (Academy of Music and Performing Arts)
- Occupations: Actor, singer
- Years active: 2009-present
- Agent: ARTgerecht Künstleragentur
- Website: (In Dutch) https://www.oedokuipers.com/

Oedo Kuipers (born 11 November 1989, in Stroobos) is a Dutch singer and actor in musical theatre. He is best known for playing the role of Mozart in the 2015 revival Mozart! Das Musical.

== Biography ==
Oedo Kuipers was raised in a musical family. His father is a music teacher and conductor, and his mother and sisters all sing and play instruments.

Kuipers began acting at the age of eight.

He attended the Fontys School of Fine and Performing Arts in Tilburg for five years and completed his education in 2013.

== Performances ==
Year	Title	Role	Venue
2009	Franciscus, Troubadour van God	Franciscus (young)	Sint-Jansbasiliek
2010	De Spooktrein	Charles merdoch	Jan van Besouwhuis
2011	Wintersprookje	Prince Florizan	M-Lab
2013	Romeo en Julia	Romeo	Opera Spanga
2013-2014	Das Phantom der Oper	Raoul, vicomte de Chagny	Neue Flora
2015-2016	Mozart! Das Musical	Mozart	Raimund Theater
2016	Ludwig²	Count Dürckheim, King Ludwig II	Festspielhaus Neuschwanstein
2017	Jesus Christ Superstar	Jesus	Staatstheater Oldenburg
2018	Matterhorn -- Das Musical	Edward Whymper	St. Gallen Theater
2019-2020, 2022	Jesus Christ Superstar	Jesus	Opernhaus Wuppertal
2022	Miss Saigon	Chris	Raimund Theater
2022	Ludwig²	King Ludwig	Festspielhaus Neuschwanstein

== Discography ==
=== Solo albums ===
- Coverart (HitSquad Records, 2016)
- Pure (HitSquad Records, 2018)

==== Cast Recordings ====
- Mozart! - Das Musical - Gesamtaufname Live (HitSquad Records, 2015); 29 tracks
- Matterhorn - das Musical (HitSquad Records, 2018); 8 tracks
