= Kootstertille =

Kootstertille Koatstertille (West Frisian)
- Village
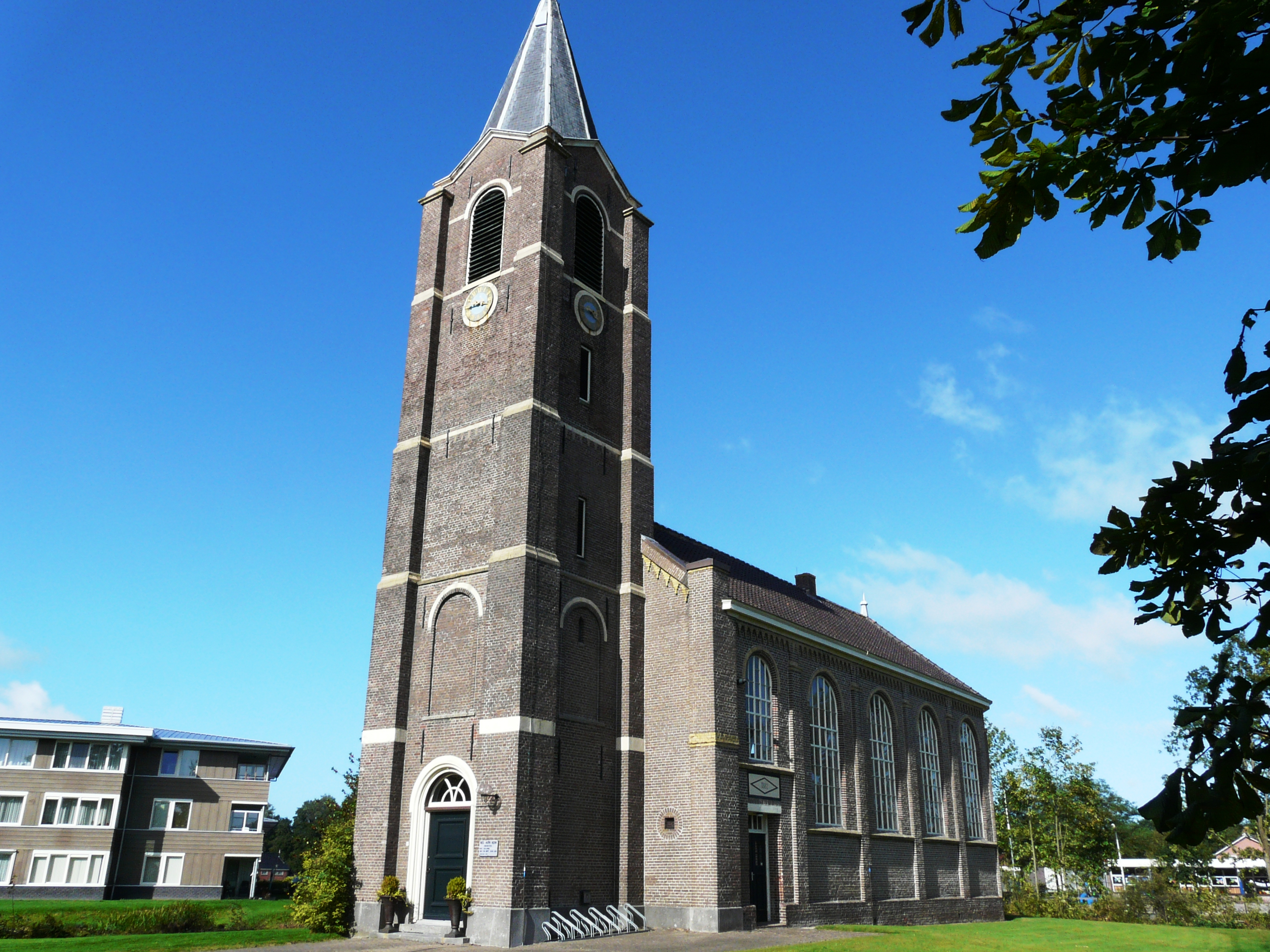
- Benedict Church

- Flag Coat of arms

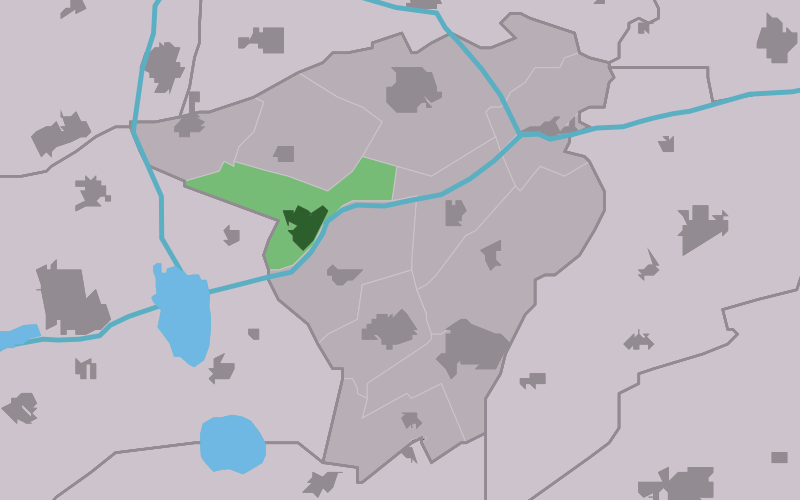
- Location in Achtkarspelen municipality

- Location in the Netherlands Kootstertille (Netherlands)
- Country: Netherlands
- Province: Friesland
- Municipality: Achtkarspelen

Area
  - Total: 7.80 km^{2} (3.01 sq mi)
- Elevation: 0.7 m (2.3 ft)

Population (2021)
  - Total: 2,425
  - Density: 311/km^{2} (805/sq mi)
- Time zone: UTC+1 (CET)
  - Summer (DST): UTC+2 (CEST)
- Postal code: 9288
- Dialing code: 0512

Kootstertille (West Frisian: Koatstertille) is a village in Achtkarspelen in the province of Friesland, the Netherlands. It had a population of around 2500 in 2017.

== History ==
The village was first mentioned in 1508 as Wigher ter Tille. Kootstertille means bridge near the village of Kooten (=little houses) which was built in 1571. The settlement quickly outgrew Kooten, and both were officially merged in 1959 as Koostertille. In 1840, it was home to 132 people. The Protestant church was built in 1883. Its location along the canal which is nowadays called Prinses Margriet Canal started to attract industry. In the late 1930s, the canal was diverted and a little harbour was created which further stimulated development.

== Gallery ==
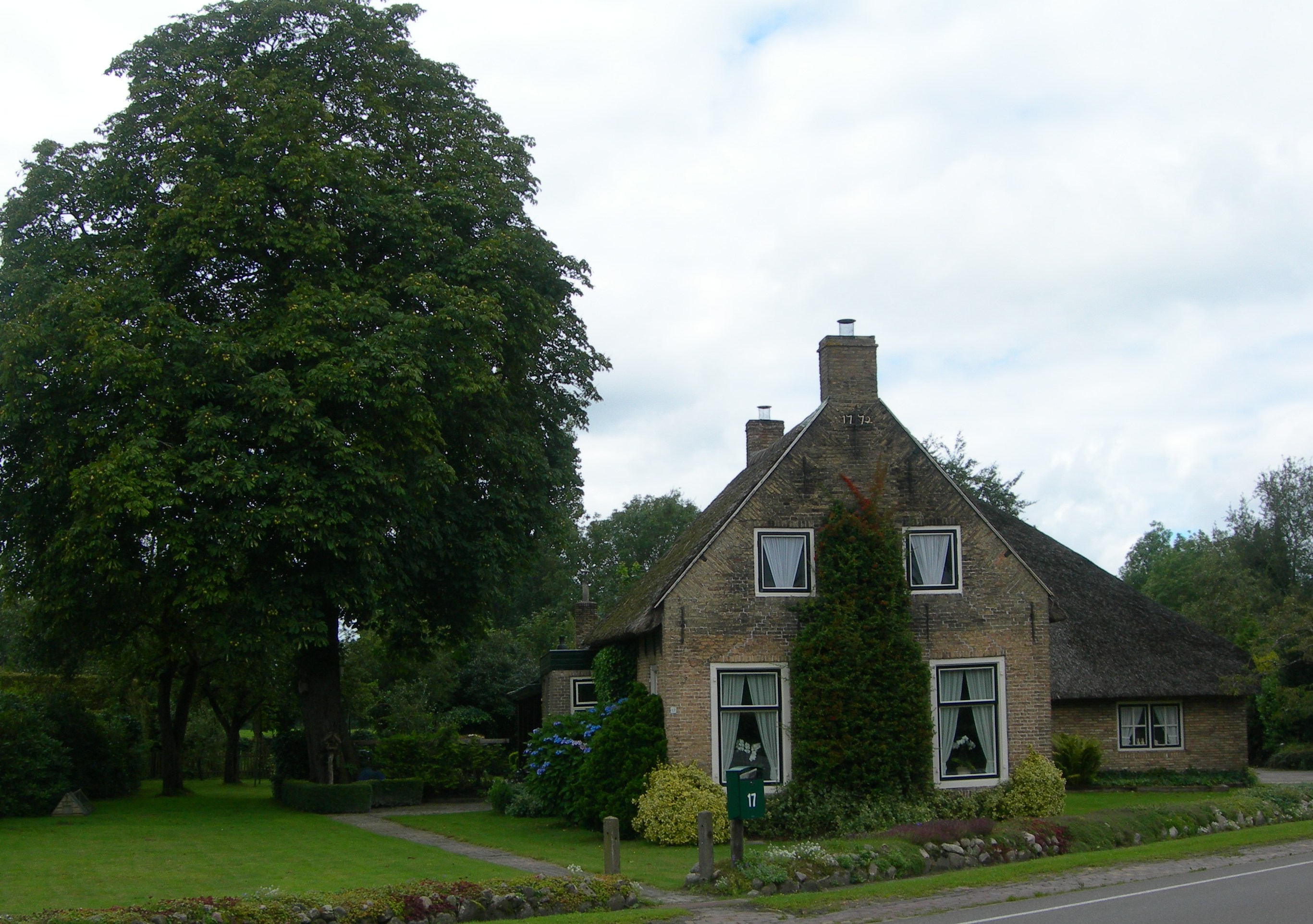
Farm in Kootstertille

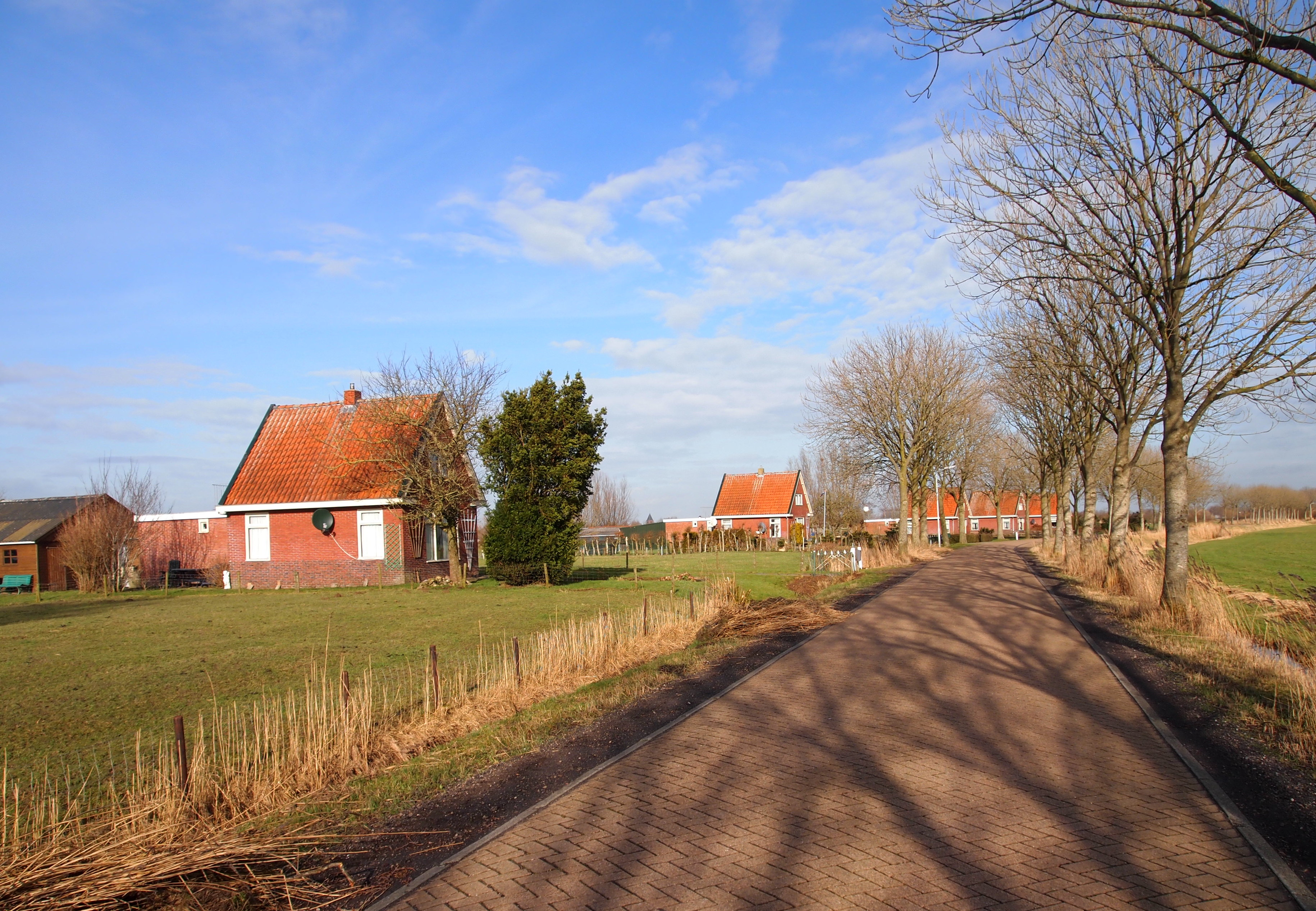
Little houses/farms

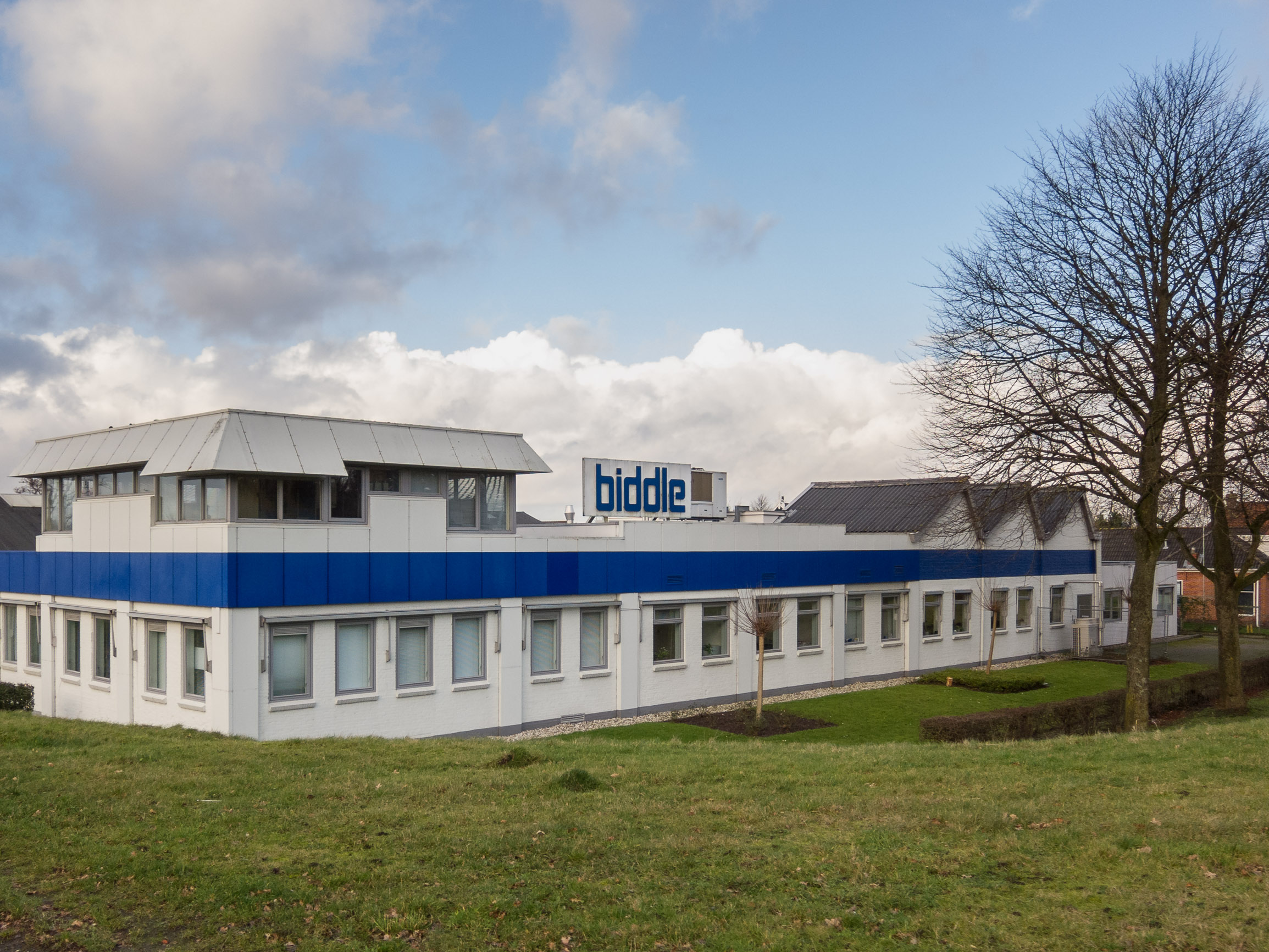
Former dairy factory

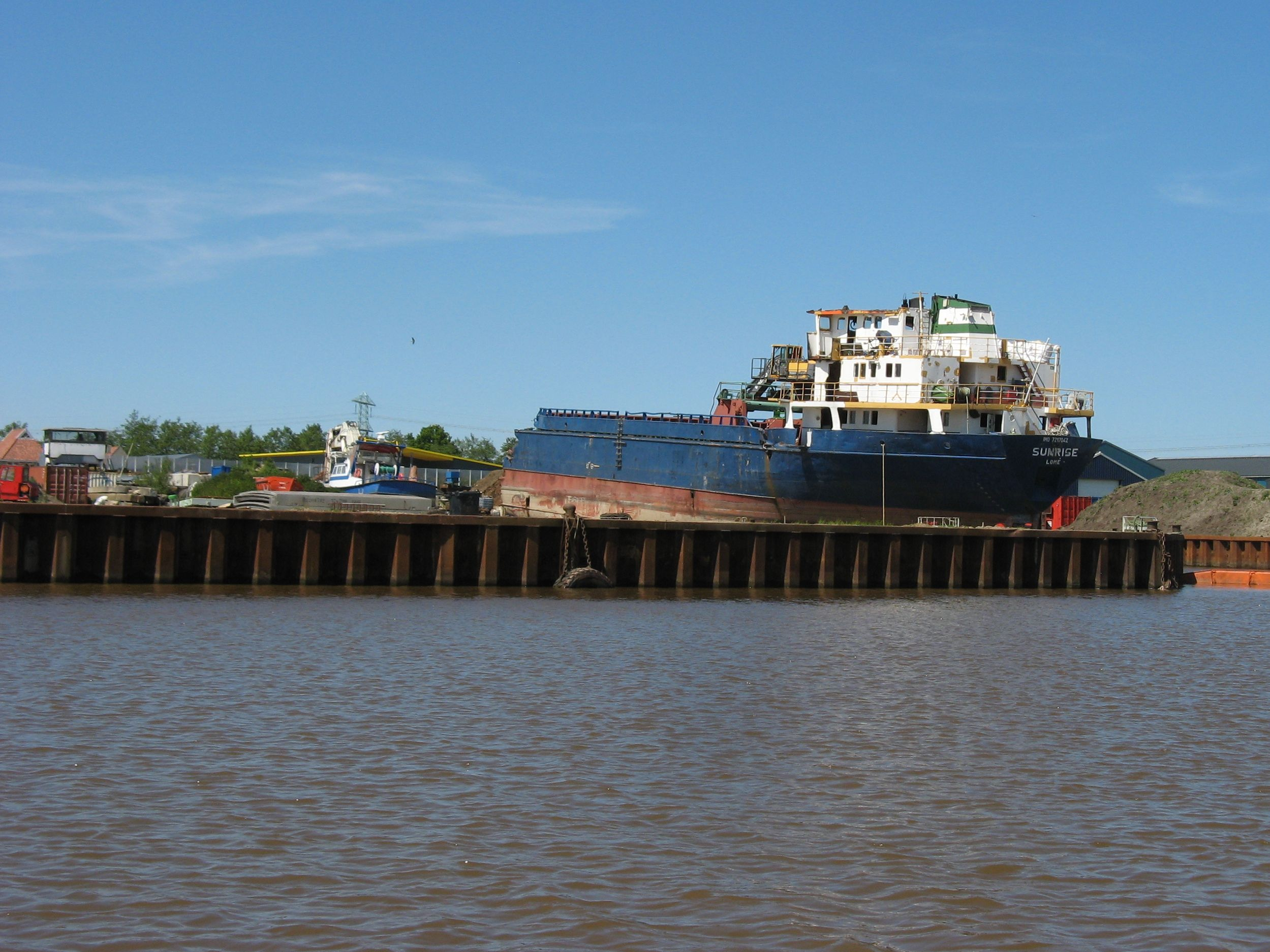
Sunrise being scrapped in Kootstertille
