= Johannes Lützen Bouma =

Dutch economist (born 1934)

Johannes Lützen Bouma (9 June 1934 – 8 March 2025) was a Dutch economist. He was a professor of business economics at the University of Groningen from 1966 to 1999.

Bouma was born in Twijzelerheide. In May 1966, he obtained his PhD at the University of Groningen with a dissertation titled: Ondernemingsdoel en winst: een confrontatie van enkele theorieën van het ondernemingsgedrag.

The role Bouma played as simultaneous member of the supervisory board of SNS Property Finance and one of its largest clients, the Burgfonds, was criticized after the bankruptcy of the Burgfonds.

Bouma was elected a member of the Royal Netherlands Academy of Arts and Sciences in 1976.
