= Stroobos =

Stroobos Strobos (West Frisian)
- Village
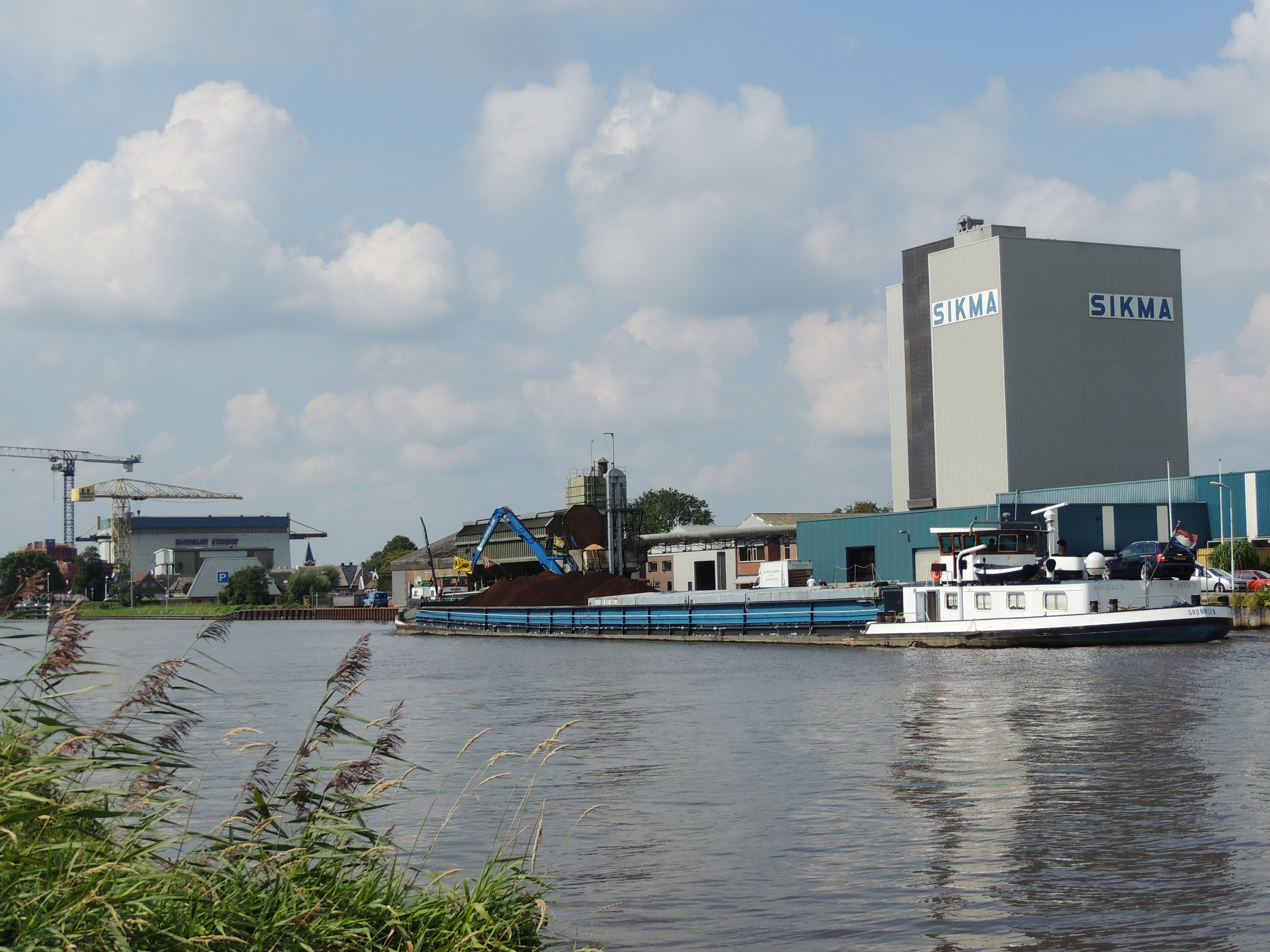
- Factories on the canal

- Flag Coat of arms

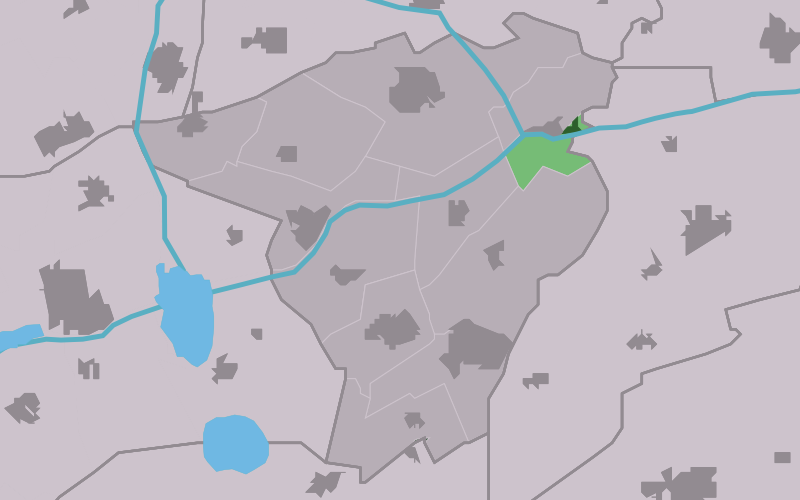
- Location in Achtkarspelen municipality

- Location in the Netherlands Stroobos (Netherlands)
- Coordinates: 53°14′N 6°13′E
- Country: Netherlands
- Province: Friesland
- Municipality: Achtkarspelen

Area
  - Total: 2.94 km^{2} (1.14 sq mi)
- Elevation: 0.7 m (2.3 ft)

Population (2021)
  - Total: 315
  - Density: 107/km^{2} (277/sq mi)
- Time zone: UTC+1 (CET)
  - Summer (DST): UTC+2 (CEST)
- Postal code: 9871
- Dialing code: 0512

Stroobos (West Frisian: Strobos) is a village in Achtkarspelen in the province of Friesland, the Netherlands. The settlement of Stroobos used to be divided between Friesland and Groningen. In 1993, the entire village was transferred to Friesland.

It forms, together with Gerkesklooster, the double village Gerkesklooster-Stroobos. The double village had a population of around 1144 in 2017, with 812 in Gerkesklooster and 332 in Stroobos.

== History ==
Gerkesklooster was established first as a village near a monastery. Strobos was first mentioned around 1660, and means a large bundle of straw. After a sluice was built in the canal from Dokkum to Groningen, it developed into a village. In 1840, Strobos was home to 417 people. In 1850, a wharf was built in Stroobos and it developed into an industrial village. Around 1900, a dairy factory opened which nowadays produces about 57,000 tons of cheese a year. The village used to be divided by the provincial border of Friesland and Groningen. In 1993, the border was redrawn and the entire village is now part of Friesland.

== Gallery ==
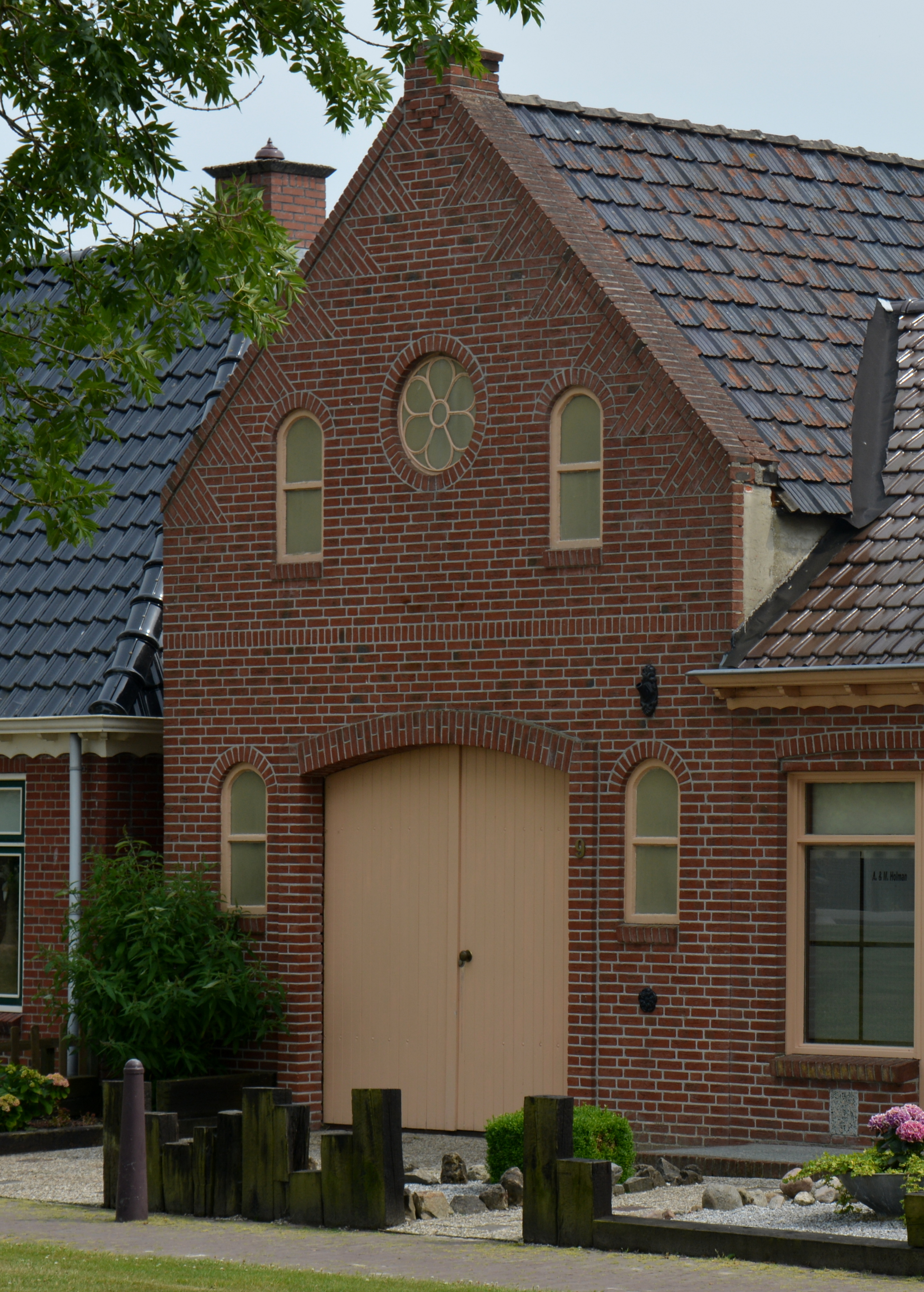
Former church building

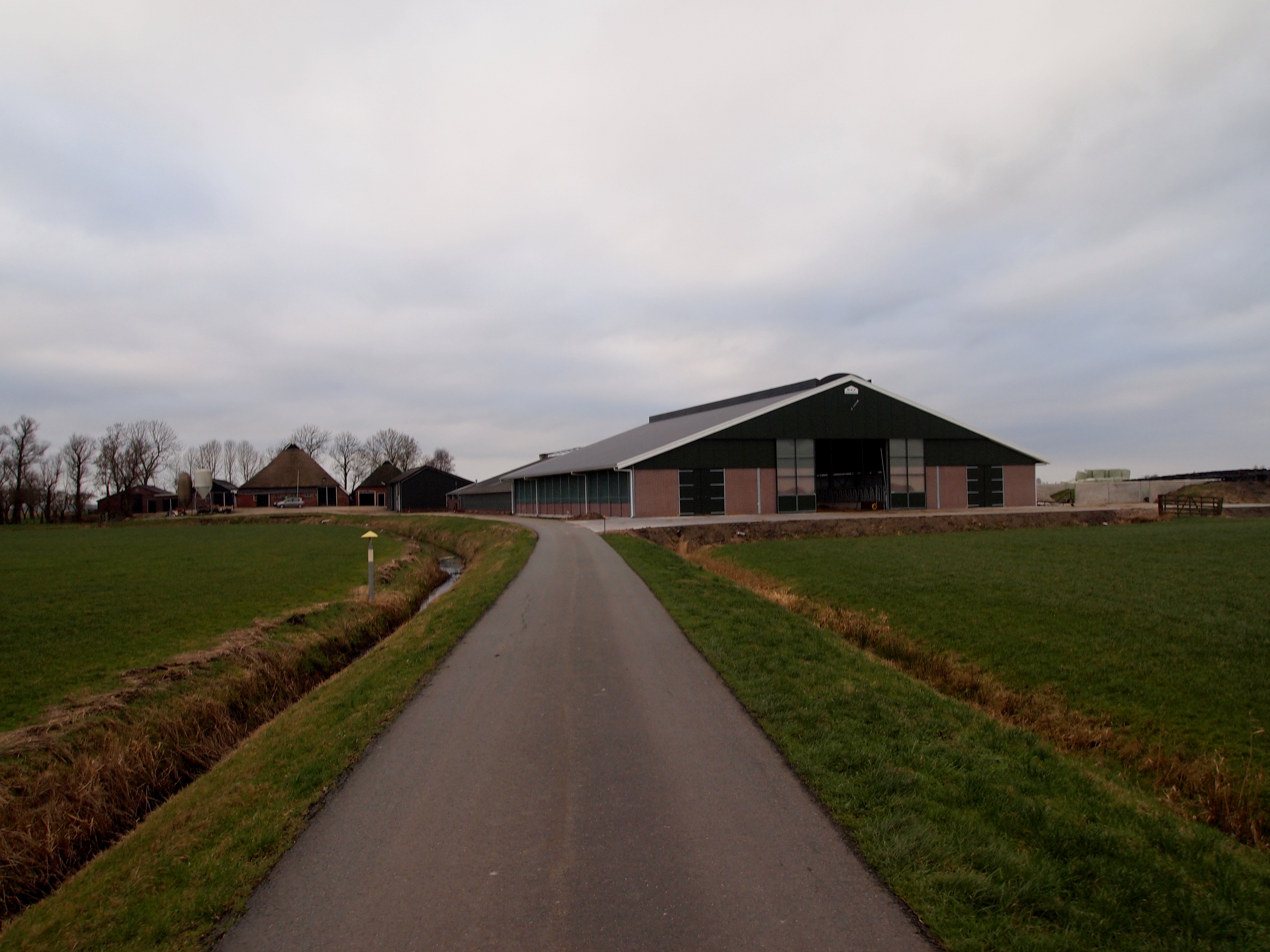
Farm in Stroobos

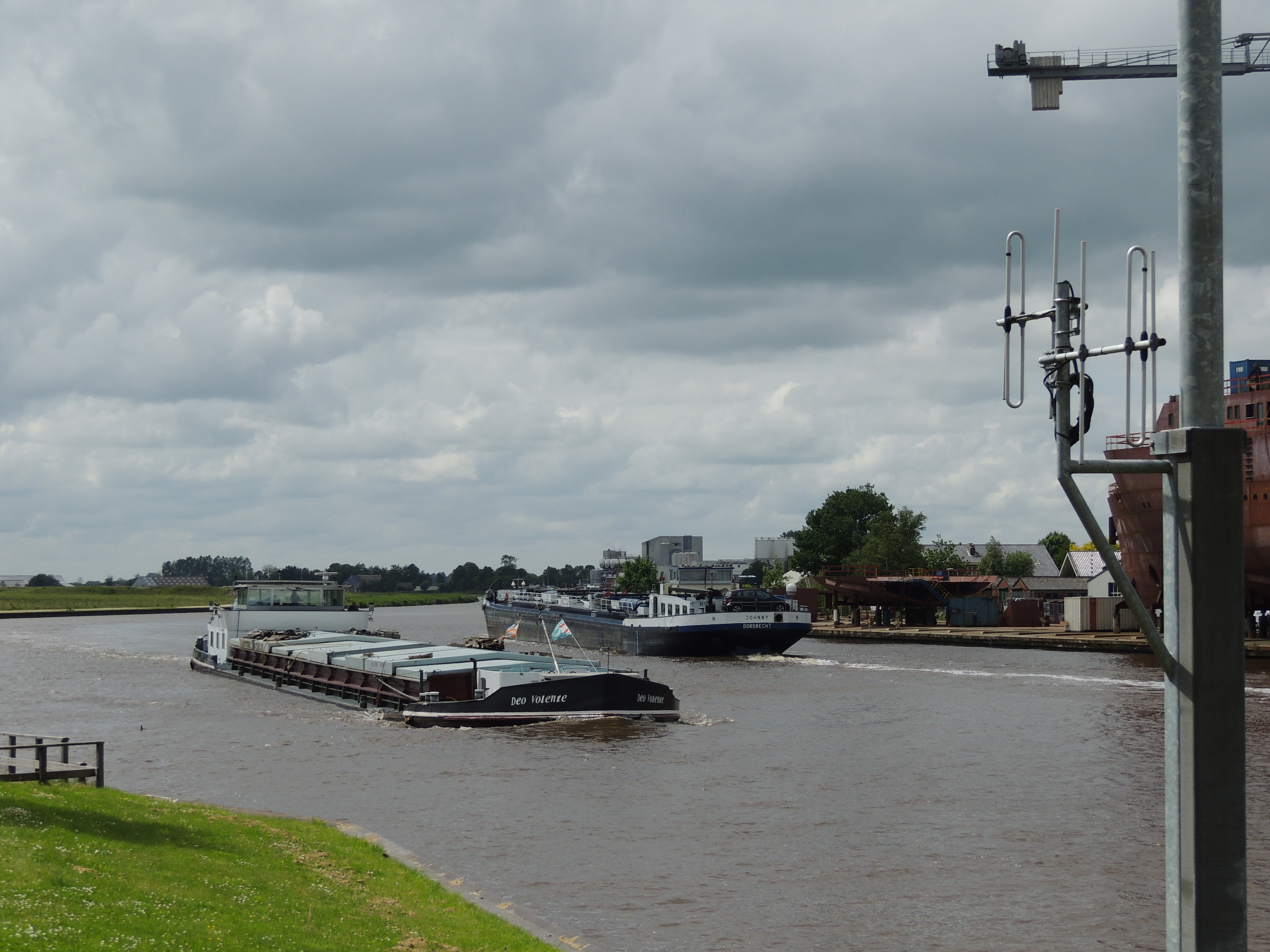
Boats on the canal

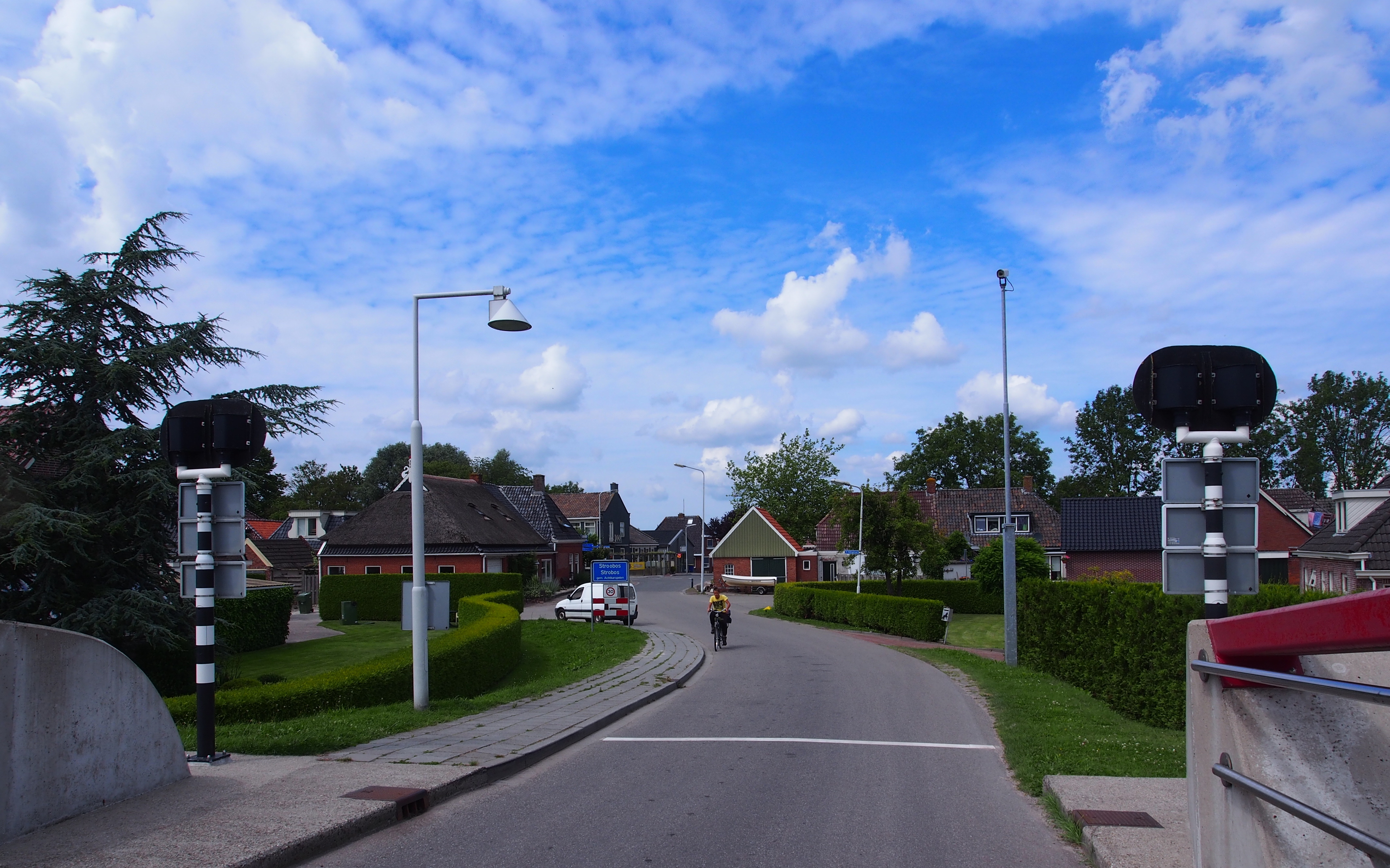
Village entrance
