= Surhuizum =

Surhuizum Surhuzum (West Frisian)
- Village
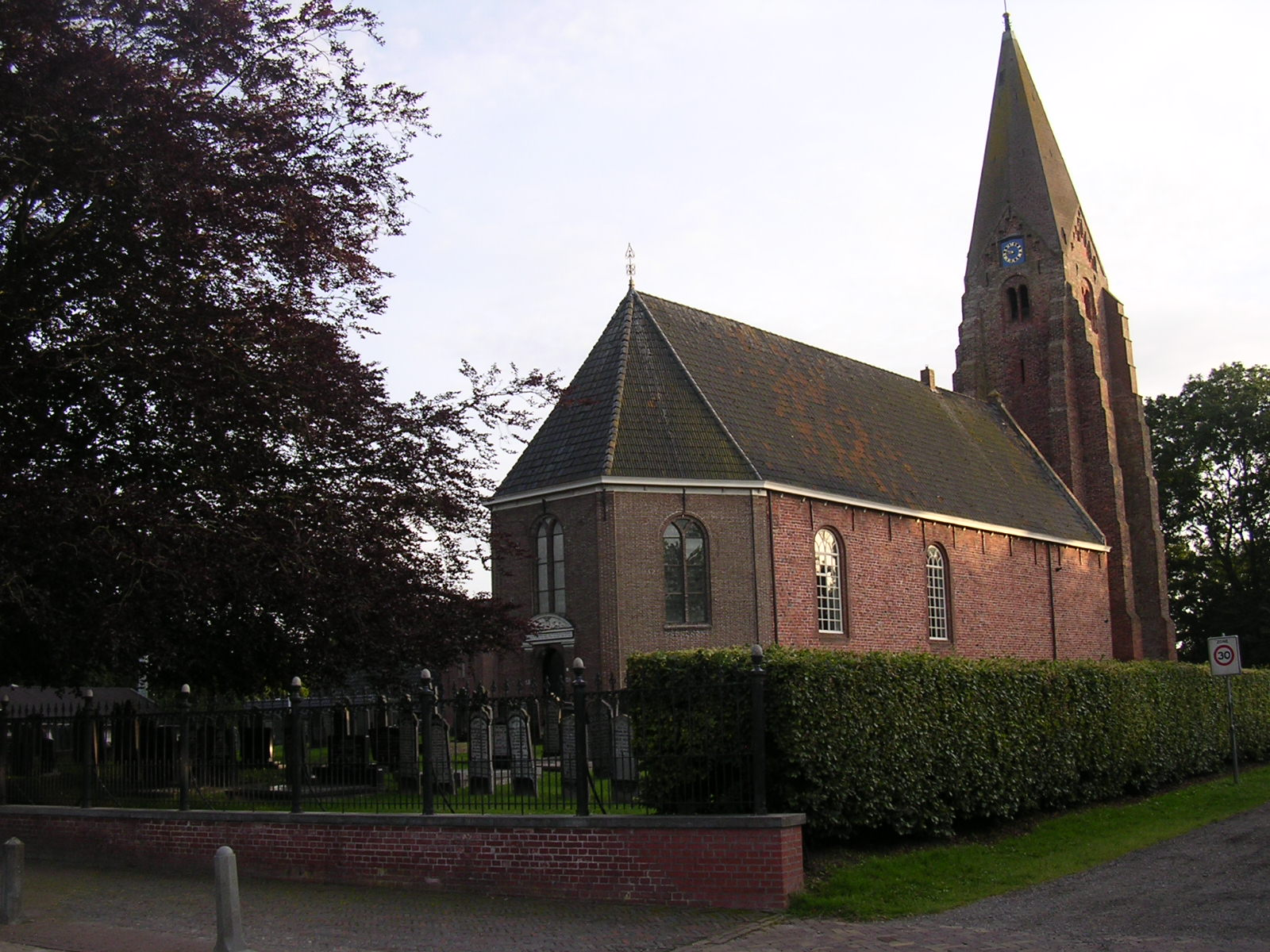
- Surhuizum Church

- Flag Coat of arms

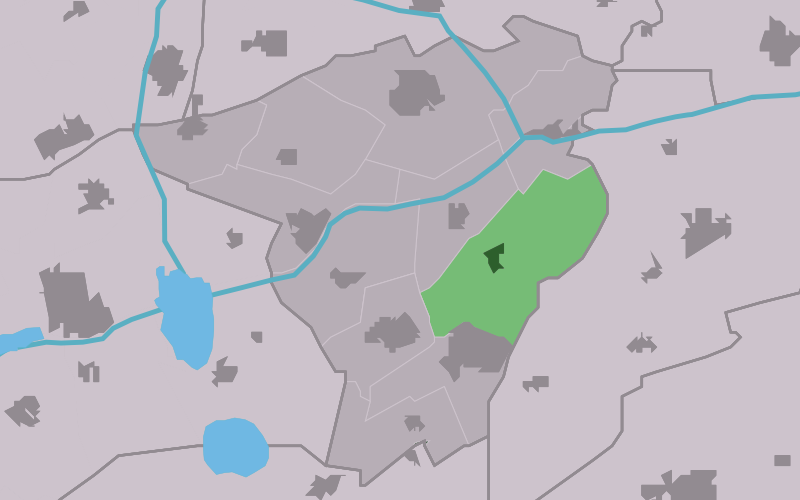
- Location in Achtkarspelen municipality

- Location in the Netherlands Surhuizum (Netherlands)
- Country: Netherlands
- Province: Friesland
- Municipality: Achtkarspelen

Area
  - Total: 14.92 km^{2} (5.76 sq mi)
- Elevation: 1 m (3.3 ft)

Population (2021)
  - Total: 1,275
  - Density: 85.46/km^{2} (221.3/sq mi)
- Time zone: UTC+1 (CET)
  - Summer (DST): UTC+2 (CEST)
- Postal code: 9283
- Dialing code: 0512

Surhuizum (West Frisian: Surhuzum) is a village in Achtkarspelen in the province of Friesland, the Netherlands. It had a population of around 1300 in 2017. Surhuizum is known for its church tower.

The village was first mentioned in 1224 as Sutherhusum, and means "houses in the south".

The tower of the Protestant Church dates from around 1300 and is much older than and detached from the church. The tower is entirely built in bricks including the spire, and is the only all brick tower in the northern provinces of the Netherlands. The original church was heavily damaged by the Spanish in the late-16th century. In 1617, a new church was built and replaced in 1734. In 1840, Surhuizum was home to 664 people.

== Gallery ==
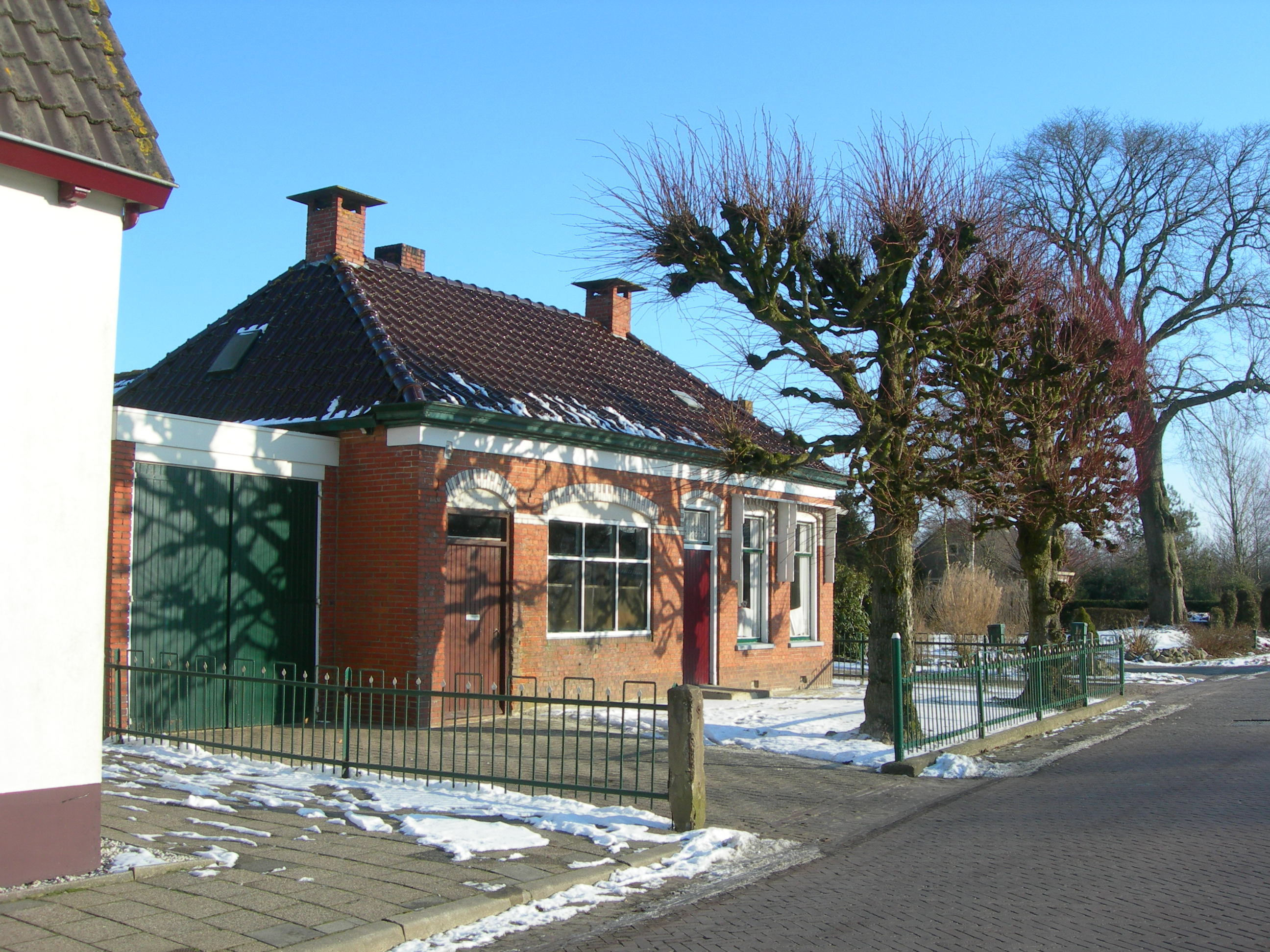
Former smithy

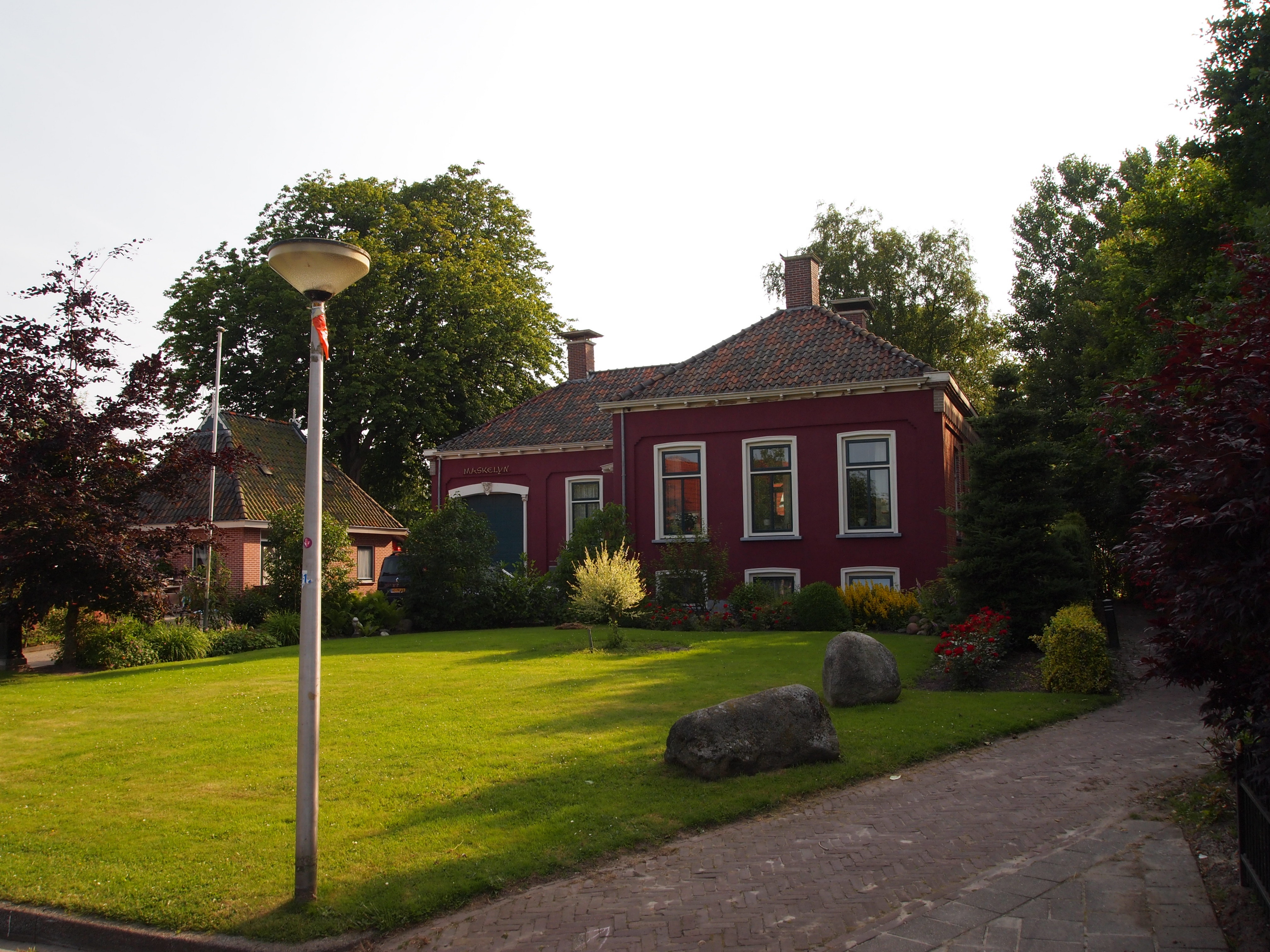
Former school

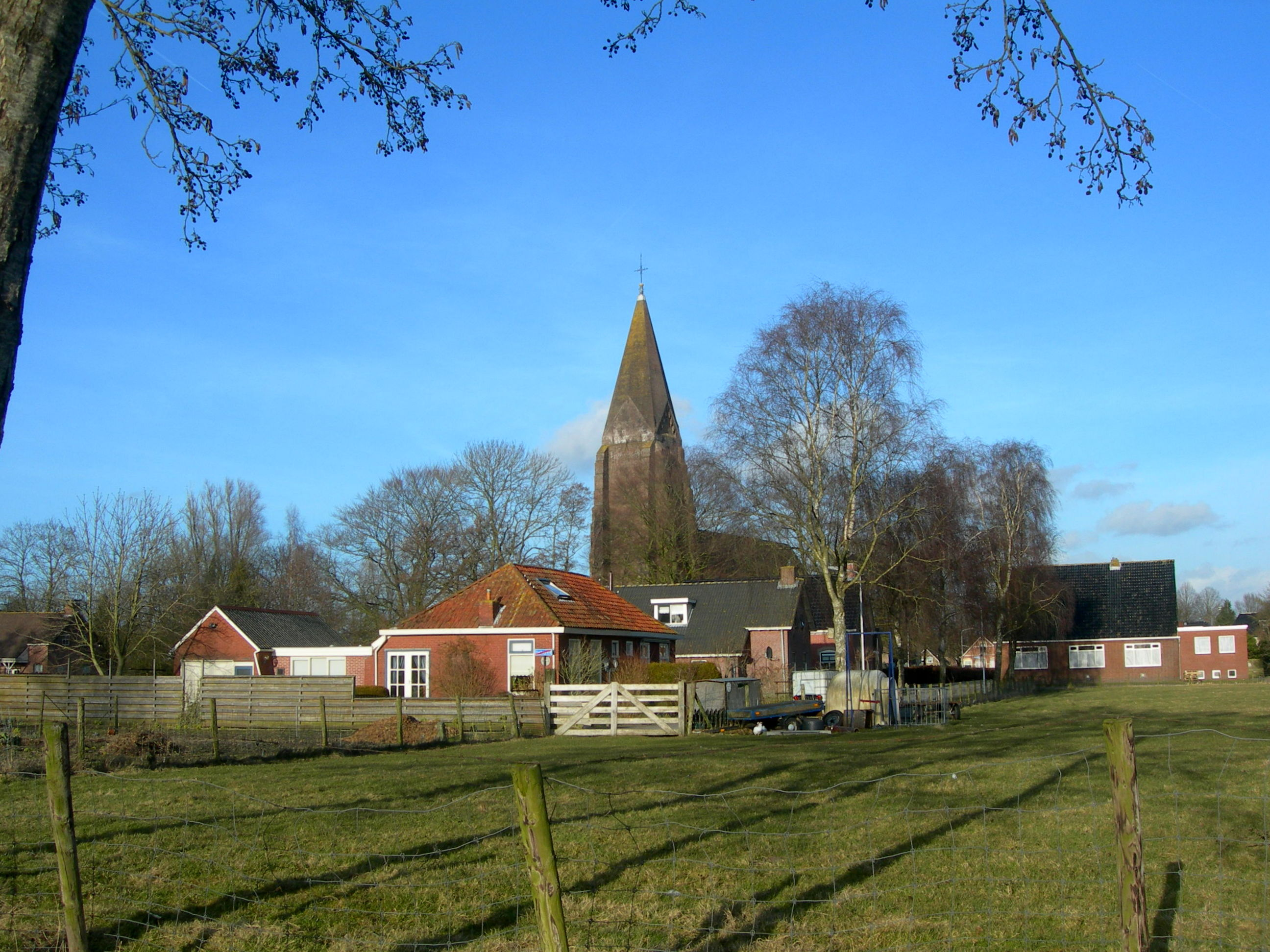
View on the village

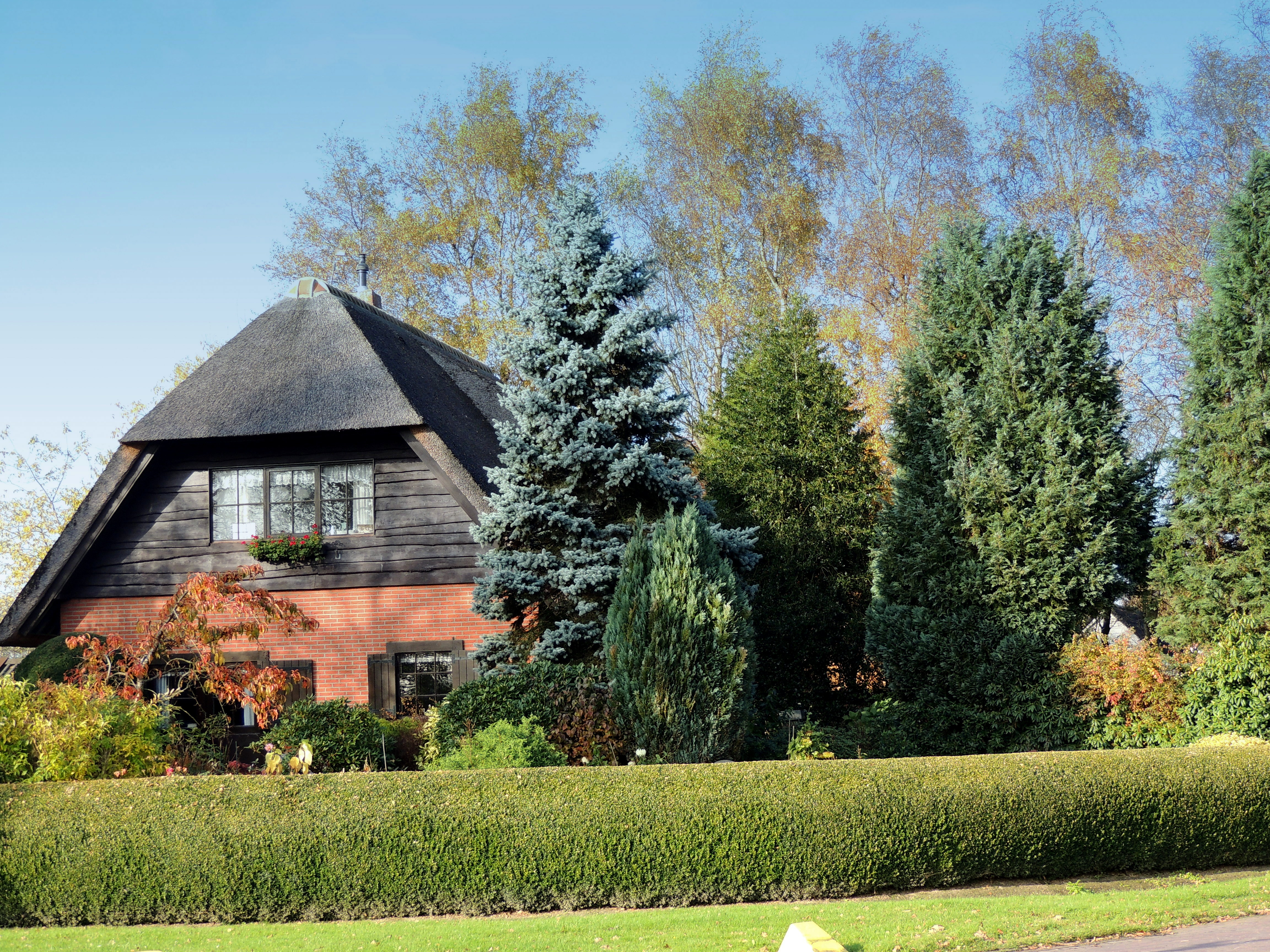
Farm Kortwoude
