= Gerriet Postma =

Dutch painter

Gerriet Postma (30 October 1932 – 27 February 2009) was a Dutch painter.

Postma was born in Twijzelerheide, Friesland, the Netherlands. He was a vehement man who painted bold paintings, with explosions of paint and abstract knots of color, with a distant figurative strain running through it.

His last large-scale work comprised four panels, painted on the four main sails of the traditional and historic cargo barge "Klipper Anna". The painting is two-sided and is about 270 m^{2} in area. The 106-year-old ship was provided by its owners, Gijs en Inge van Hesteren from Harlingen, Friesland, the Netherlands. All summer long in 2004, the painting could be seen everywhere around the Dutch Wadden Sea.

By 2009 Postma had become the best-known Frisian painter. His work is on display in galleries of Paris, Brussels and Barcelona.

Postma died in Groningen on 27 February 2009.
