= Skûlenboarch =

Coordinates: 53.201°N 6.068°E

- Hamlet
- Interactive map of Skûlenboarch
- Country: Netherlands
- Province: Friesland

Population
  - Total: ?

Skûlenboarch (Dutch: Schuilenburg) is a hamlet in Tytsjerksteradiel in the province Friesland of the Netherlands. The hamlet lies south of Jistrum, every house north of the Prinses Margriet Canal falls officially under Jistrum. The houses south of the canal are officially part of Eastermar. A bridge connects the two halves of Skûlenboarch with each other. The Joost Wiersmawei(road) connects the hamlet with Jistrum and a cycling path connects the yacht harbour with Skûlenboarch. It is located east of the Burgumer Mar, at the entrance of the Kolonelsdiep.
