= Jistrum =

Jistrum Eestrum
- Village
- Jistrum
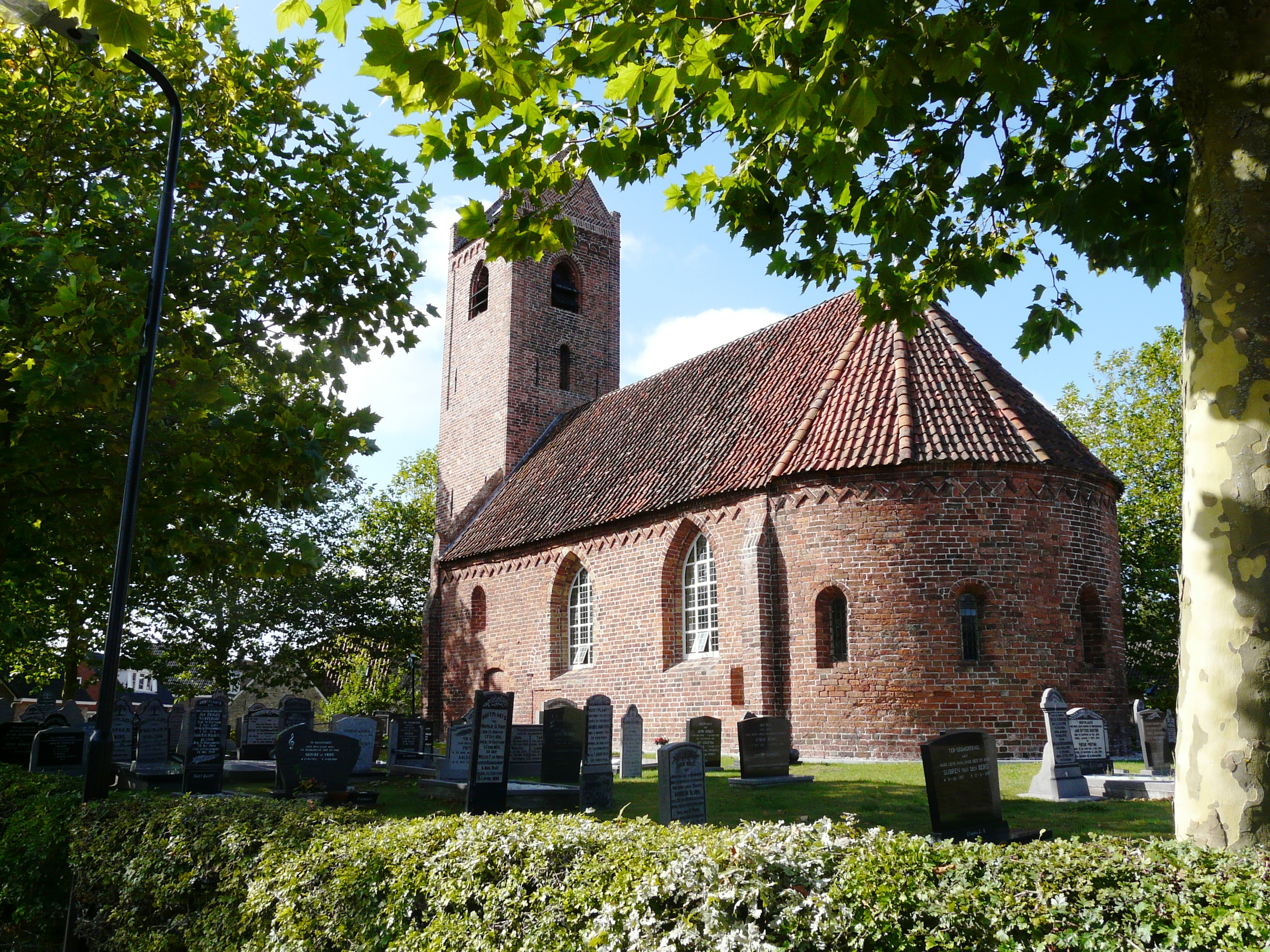
- Church of Jistrum

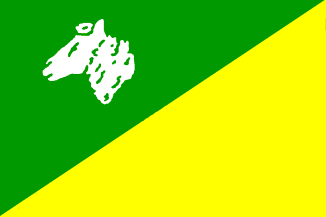
- Flag Coat of arms

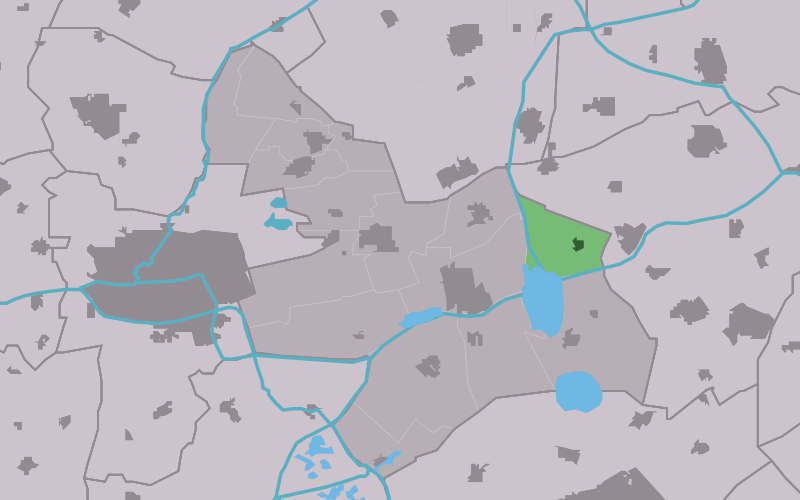
- Location of the village in Tytsjerksteradiel

- Location in the Netherlands Jistrum (Netherlands)
- Country: Netherlands
- Province: Friesland
- Municipality: Tytsjerksteradiel
- Established: 1230

Government
  - Burgemeester: Jeroen Gebben (VVD)

Population (2020)
  - Total: 920
- Time zone: UTC+1 (CET)
  - Summer (DST): UTC+2 (CEST)
- Postal code: 9258
- Dialing code: 0512

Jistrum (Dutch: Eestrum) is a village in the municipality Tytsjerksteradiel in the province of Friesland of the Netherlands. It lies northeast of the Burgumer Mar and had a population of around 921 in January 2017.

The town has a marina that is connected with the lake and lies on the Zevenwoudenpad. The local soccer club of the town is VV Jistrum, the club is playing in a green shirt with vertical white stripes, white shorts and green socks. It was founded in 1949 and the soccer field is located on the Fjildwei.

== Church ==
The Dutch Reformed Church was built in the thirteenth century. This is known because sources name the church as an owner of a pasture in the Mieden around 1230. It is a small building in romanesque style with gothic style windows. Eye catching are the hagioscopes in the east bay of the nave. These windows are also known as leprozenruitjes (windows for people with leprosy). In 2007, the renovation of the church started and the old Pipe organ of the other church in town was installed.

== Schooling ==
The town has 1 school called Bernemienskip De Greide. This school was founded in 2019 when the schools De Finne and It Iepenstee came in fusion.

== Blauwe hoek ==
The Blauwe Hoek is a recreational beach opened in 2013

== Skûlenboarch ==
The township that lies south of Jistrum is Skûlenboarch, every house north of the Prinses Margriet Canal falls officially under the village. The houses south of the canal are officially part of Eastermar. A bridge connects the two halves of Skûlenboarch with each other. The Joost Wiersmawei connects the hamlet with the village and a cycling path connects the marina with Skûlenboarch.
