= Gaarkeuken Lock =

- Gaarkeukensluis
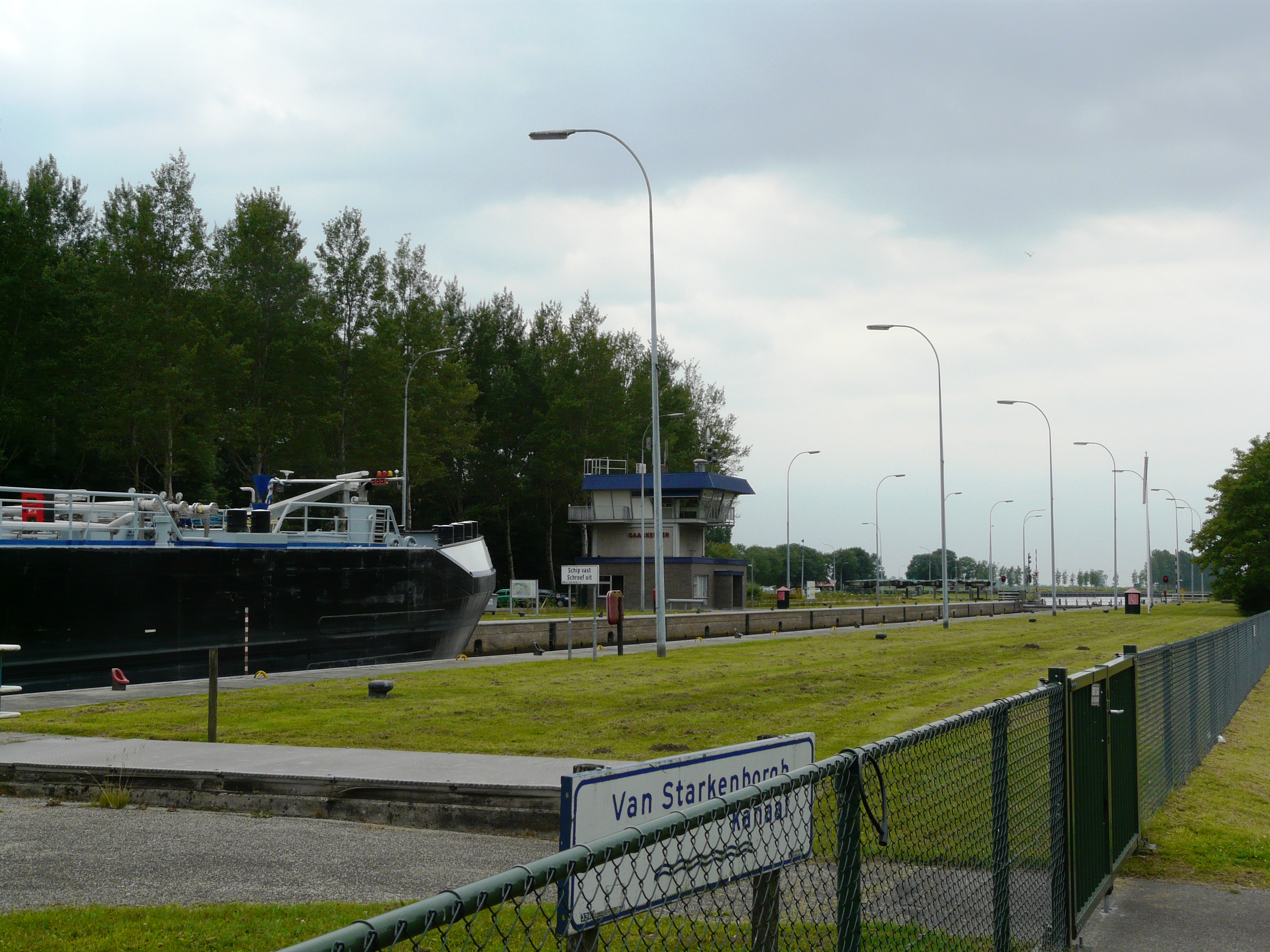
- Gaarkeuken Lock in December 2010
- 53.248891°N 6.311297°E
- Waterway: Lemmer–Delfzijl Waterway
- Country: Netherlands
- County: Groningen (province)
- Maintained by: Rijkswaterstaat
- Length: 190.08 m (1980)
- Width: 16.00 m (1980)

Gaarkeuken Lock is a major inland lock in the northern Netherlands. It is part of the Lemmer–Delfzijl Waterway. Today, Gaarkeuken Lock actually consists of a big lock and a sluice just south of it.

The history of Gaarkeuken Lock can be traced back to the 1680s. Successive locks were built at the site until the current lock was built in 1980. Data about vessels passing the locks reflects some developments in inland shipping. The increase in average barge size is obvious. Other traffic at the locks consisted of timber rafts and coastal trading vessels.

== Characteristics ==
=== On the Friesland - Groningen border ===
On the Lemmer–Delfzijl Waterway, the border between Friesland and Groningen is at Stroobos, about 6 km west of Gaarkeuken. However, the hydrographic border between the Frisian water level (Fries Zomerpeil -0.66 m NAP) and the lower Groningen water level (Electrapeil: -0.93 m NAP) is at Gaarkeuken Lock.

=== Gaarkeuken Lock ===
Gaarkeuken Lock lifts vessels from the Groningen water level to the Frisian water level and v.v. It has miter gates that are 16.00 m wide. In 1980, the depth at the gates was 5.70 m below N.A.P. In 2025 this meant 5.28 m deep on the Frisian side and 4.87 m deep on the Groningen side. The length of the lock chamber is 190 m.

As regards construction, the lock chamber of Gaarkeuken Lock is a giant kind of concrete tub. Near the gates, the bottom is 2.20 m thick. Below the lock, there is a steel screen that goes into the ground to 11 m below N.A.P.. This is to prevent groundwater from passing from Friesland to Groningen below the lock.

=== The sluice (waterinlaat) ===
The Gaarkeuken sluice is located just south of the lock. It controls the inflow of water from Friesland to Groningen. About 200 m west of the lock, a side canal leads to this sluice called waterinlaat. This is a tiny building that stands on top of two culverts that are about 20 m long and have a diameter of 2.40 by 3.40 m.

== History ==
Gaarkeuken Lock is part of the Van Starkenborgh Canal which is in turn part of the Lemmer–Delfzijl Waterway. The section where Gaarkeuken Lock is located, is actually a reused and upgraded part of the much older Hoendiep. A Gaarkeuken was an inn with cheap food. This gave its name to the lock and the hamlet Gaarkeuken that grew around the lock.

Gaarkeuken Lock is mentioned as the 'Gaer Koecke' on a 1680s map. The Gaarkeuken inn bordered the lock on its the northern side (see 1820 map). In 1775, this lock and the nearby lock at Stroobos were dammed off for repairs, blocking traffic on the canal.

=== The 1806 lock ===
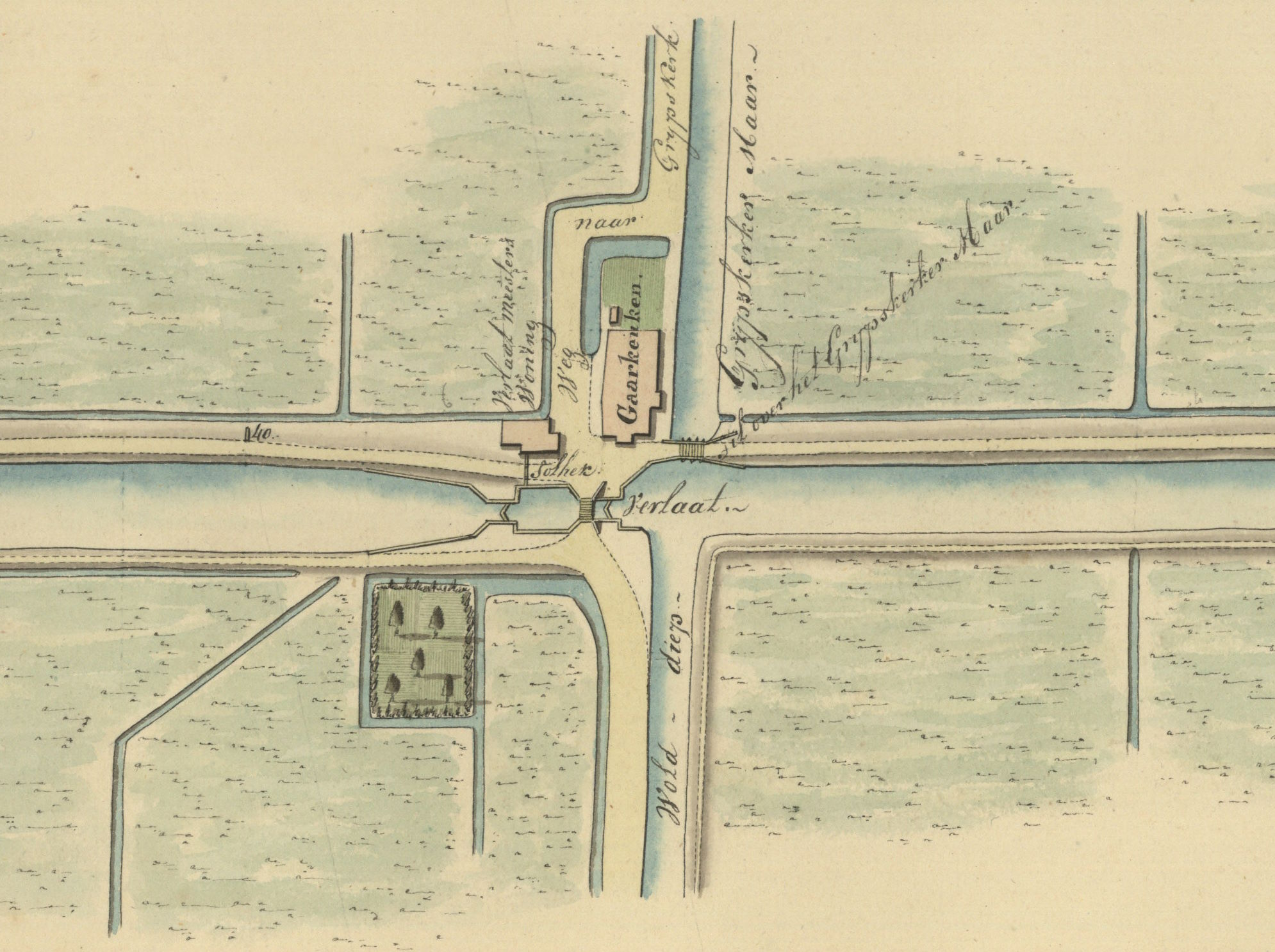
Gaarkeuken Lock in 1820

In 1806, Gaarkeuken Lock was renovated again. This time, a side canal was made to allow shipping to continue. The design map of the 1864 lock shows the remains of this side canal. Maps made in 1818-1820 and in 1823 show this version of the lock. The more detailed 1823 map shows a very irregular kind of lock. In 1843, the western gates and the masonry there were renewed. This might explain the more regular form on the 1864 map and a map made in 1844.

In 1858, the lock gates were said to be 4.96 and 4.97 m wide. The sill of the west gate was 1.27 m below the Munnekezijl water level. The length of the lock chamber, i.e. the distance between the upper and lower gates, was 29.00 m. Its width was 11.50 m. However, the maximum length of the ships that could use the lock was only 17 m. This was an unusually big difference that might have been caused by the irregular form of the lock.

=== The 1864 lock ===
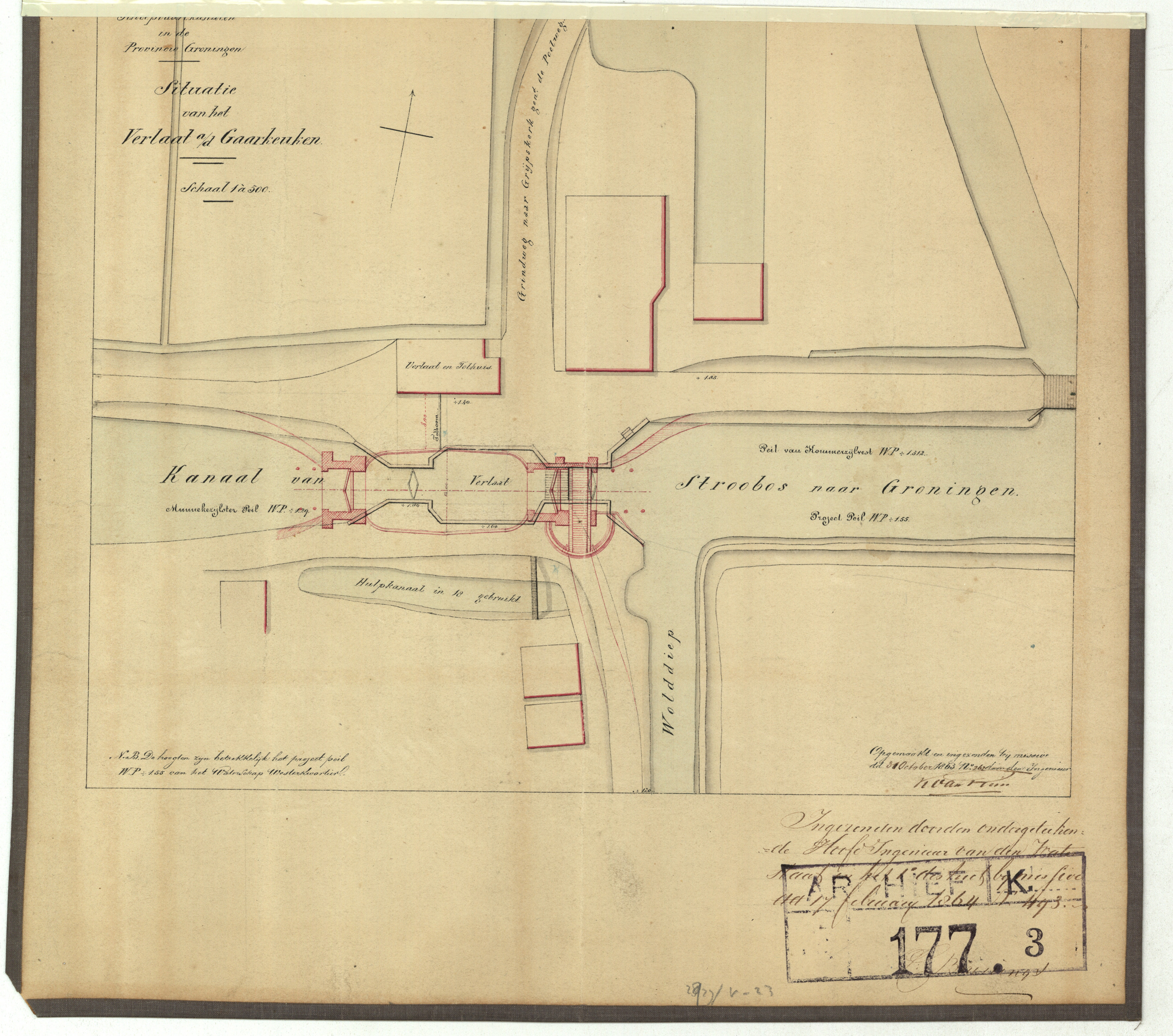
The 1864 lock

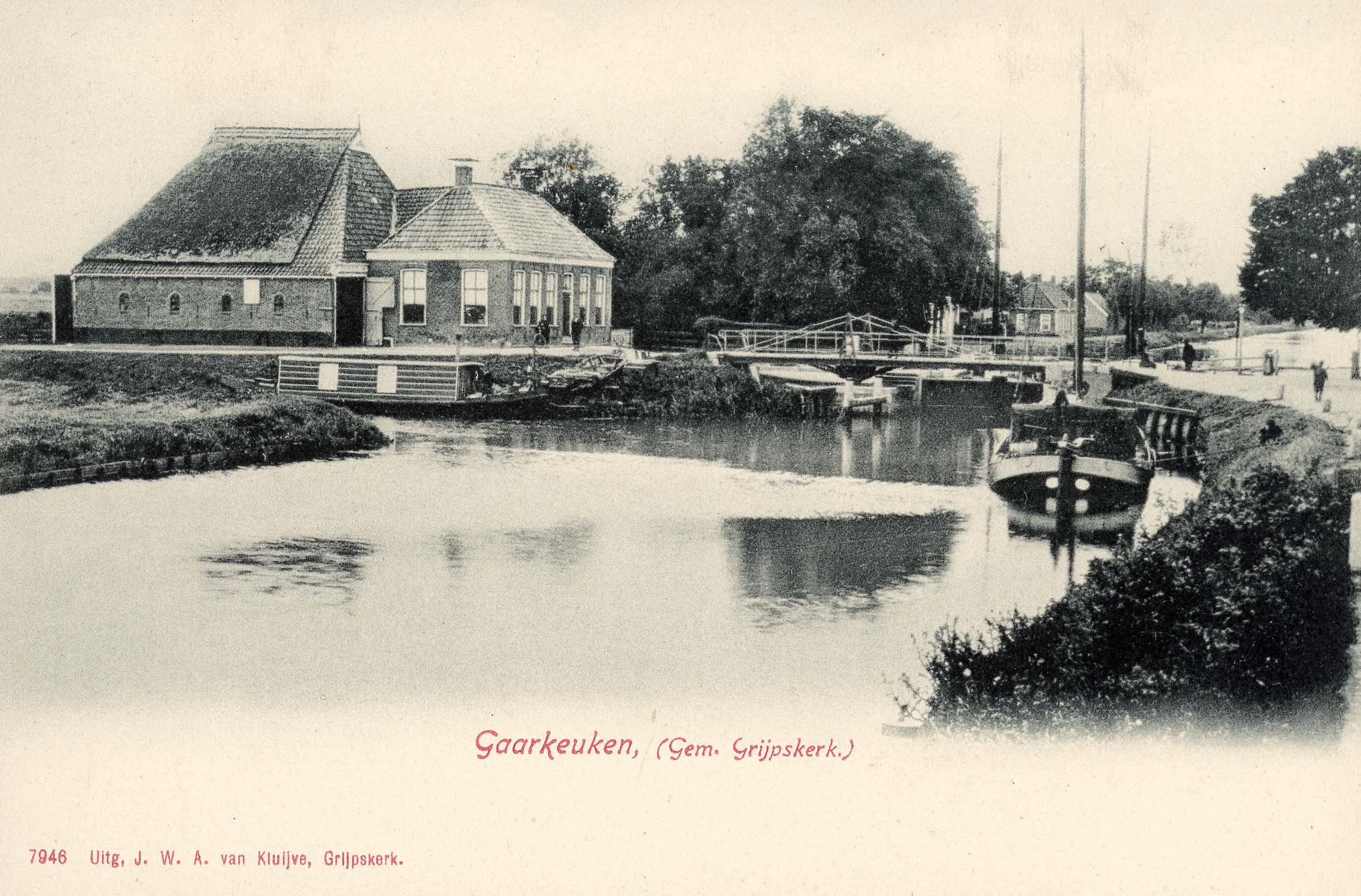
The 1864 Gaarkeuken Lock from the east in 1900-05.

The 1864 Gaarkeuken Lock was built as part of a plan by Groningen province to upgrade several waterways. At the time, the Hoendiep still had four locks (Kinderverlaat, Vierverlaten, Gaarkeuken, and the inactive Groningen lock at Stroobos). The plan called for these to be replaced by a single lock at Gaarkeuken.

The new lock was ordered in April 1864. It was built at the same site as the old one. It's not immediately clear how this was done. The demolition of the Frisian lock at Stroobos was ordered only in May 1866.

The new lock was 31.5 by 6 by 2 m, allowing barges of 250-300t to pass. In 1864, this would have made the lock suitable for almost all of the barges that plied the more famous Zuid-Willemsvaart. Over there, only a few barges were bigger than 300t. At the time, the tonnage limits were determined by the human and animal power that was needed when the winds were unfavorable. For the over 300t barges three draft horses were required.

In the north, the ample opportunities to sail by wind probably made that horse-drawn 300t barges made no sense. At first, the canal itself was deep enough for barges with a draft of up to 2 m. In spite of this, the program to upgrade the Hoendiep was very successful. From 1878 to 1898, traffic at Gaarkeuken Lock increased from 500,000t to 1,250,000t.

From 1901 to 1915, some shipping data is known about Gaarkeuken Lock:

Shipping at the 1864 lock
Year	# barges	tonnage (t)	average t
1901	22,872	1,167,738t	51t
1905	24,340	1,363,527t	55t
1909	24,301	1,440,817t	59t
1912	27,402	1,730,089	63t
1915	30,366	1,881,589	62t

=== The 1924 lock ===
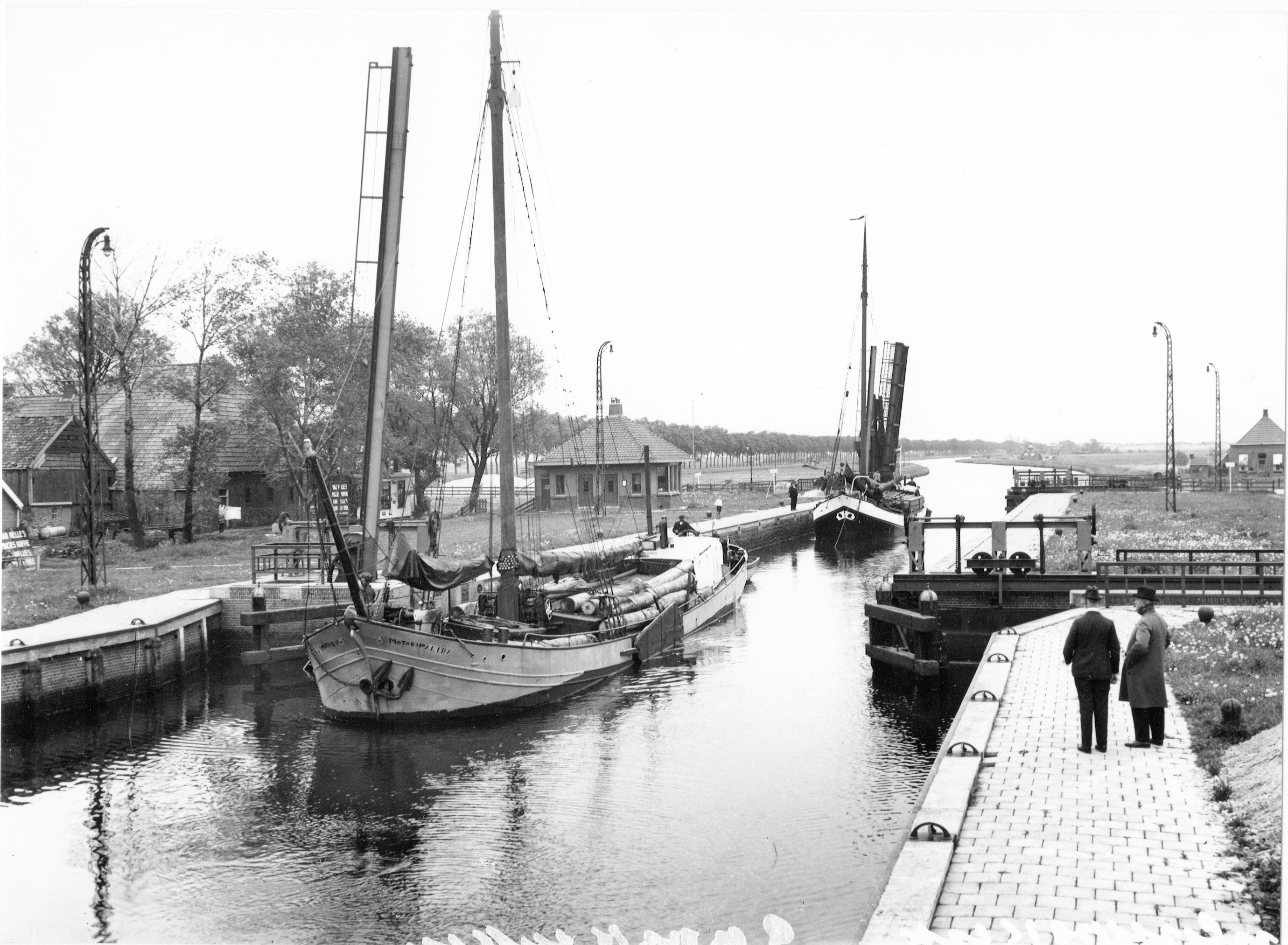
From the west, motorized barge with tow, 1924-1930

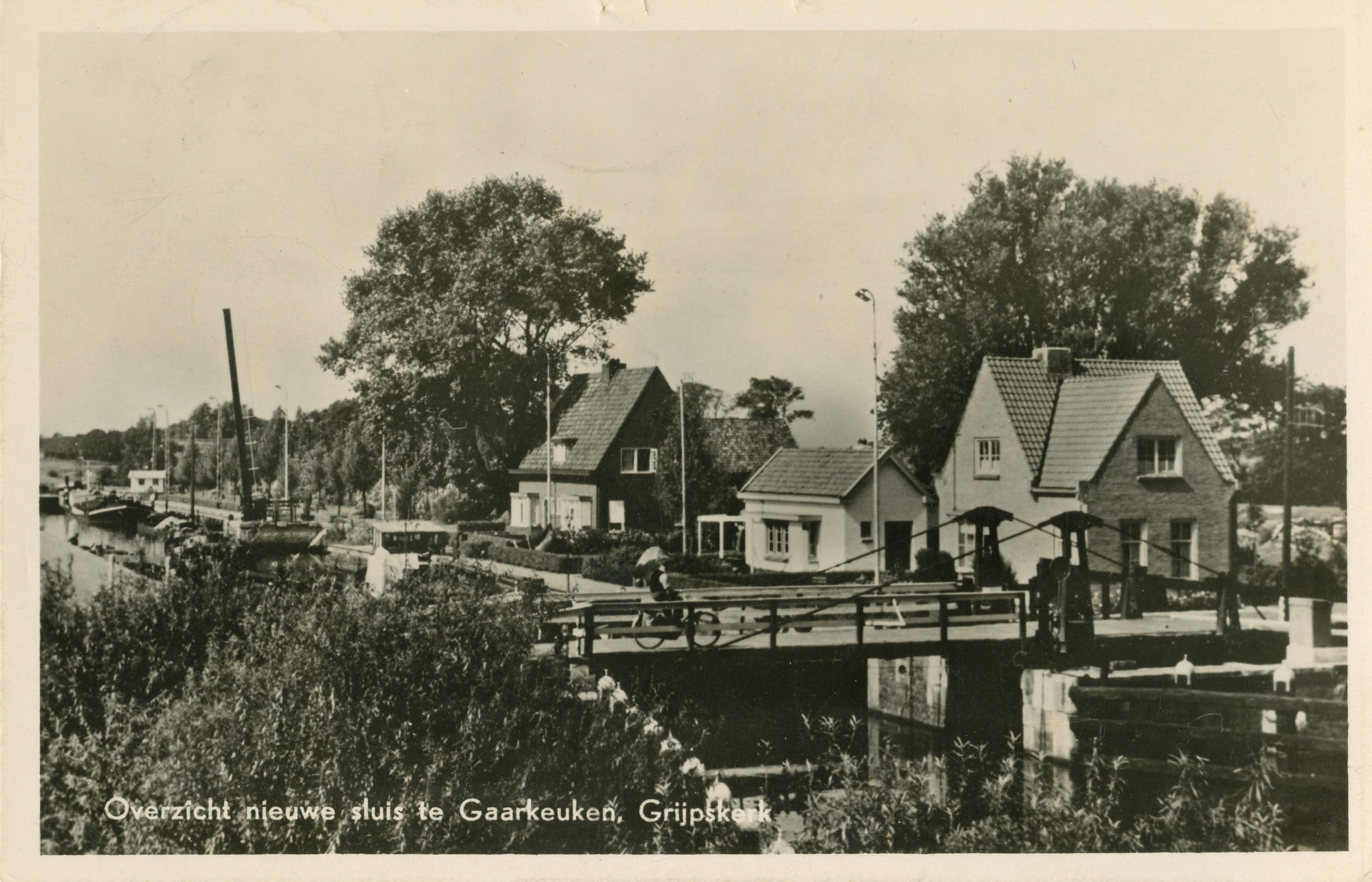
Gaarkeuken Lock seen from the east c 1948

The 1924 Gaarkeuken Lock was built as part of a plan to upgrade the Hoendiep for 600-700t barges. In 1919, the provincial government of Groningen decided to build this new lock. In 1921, the overal plan was expanded to a canal for 1,000t barges. The 1,000t requirement meant that barges that were 80 by 9.2 by 2.4 m with a height of 4.75 m had to be able to use the canal. Therefore, a lock for 1,000t barges was built from 1922 to 1924.

The new lock was built in a new about 1 km long side canal south of the 1864 lock. This canal was immediately constructed on the dimensions of the planned canal and had extra solid banks. The new lock had two connected lock chambers. The idea was that only the lower (eastern) one would be used regularly. In busy times, e.g. during the sugar beet harvest, the upper chamber would also be used, creating a single big lock chamber. This could also be used for a tow of two 1,000t barges. Effectively, the new lock could be used by 1,350t barges.

The upper (western) lock chamber was 18 m wide and 99.3 m long. The lower (eastern) one was 12 m wide and 85 m long. In between, there was a section which held the central pair of gates. It gave a useful service length of 190 m. There were three pairs of iron doors that floated a bit because of the air that they contained. These doors each hung from an overhead rail by two carriages. These doors were practical when there was ice on the canal. The most western pair of gates was 12 m wide, the others only 10 m. The sill of all three gates was at 3 m below canal level.

During World War II, Gaarkeuken Lock was bombarded. On 11 November 1944, allied aircraft dropped 32 bombs of 250 kg at the locks. The allies bombarded the lock because it was on one of the main routes by which the German occupiers transported bulk goods between Holland and Germany. By January 1945, the lock had been temporarily repaired. In November 2014 a small documentary was made about this bombardment.

Post World War II, more fundamentals repairs required the lock to be dammed off. Meanwhile, the old 1864 lock had served as a sluice that drained water from Friesland to eastern Groningen. Starting in 1949, a temporary lock was made that used parts of the old lock. It allowed barges of 39 by 5.90 by 2-2.10 m to pass. In 1950, the 1924 lock was dammed off, pumped dry and repaired. The chamber walls had crumbled in four places and part had caved in. Some of the brick frames of the gates had rifts. However, in the long term, the bombardment caused that the brickwork could never be properly repaired and remained vulnerable right till the lock was replaced. After the lock had been repaired, the old lock was again changed to a sluice.

The 1924 Gaarkeuken Lock was very successful. After the opening of the Prinses Margriet Canal in 1951, traffic on the canal boomed. The increase of total tonnage passing the locks was mainly caused by an increase in the average size of barges on the canal.

In the late 1860s, the growth of traffic on the Lemmer–Delfzijl Waterway made that Gaarkeuken Lock became a bottleneck. This was aggravated by that the gates were operated by hand, which made the lock slow. Another problem was the bad state of the lock, which had never been fully repaired after the bombardment.

Shipping at the 1924 lock
Year	# barges	tonnage (t)	average t	rafts
1927	29,919	2,168,281t	72t	40
1929	29,039	1,963,289t	68t	62
1933	25,210	1,764,029t	70t	10
1934	24,996	1,710,645t	68t	14
1936	22,840	1,640,575t	72t	7
1937	24,282	1,838,688t	76t	9
1939	27,210	2,158,455t	79t	11
1949	33,091	2,700,981t	82t	79
1950	28,965	2,360,092t	81t	195
1951	30,566	3,802,607t	124t	117
1952		2,860,000t	131t	
1962		8,950,000t	318t	
1967	27,018	11,694,800t	416t	
1972	22,928	11,312,500t	493t	

=== The current lock (1980) ===
The growth of traffic on the canal and the state of Gaarkeuken Lock made that authorities began to recognize the urgency of replacing the lock. This would be part of finally making the Lemmer–Delfzijl Waterway suitable for 2,000t barges. This meant that the new lock had to be wider and deeper. The first serious plans to build the current lock were made in 1968.

Before construction of a new lock could start, a new canal and sluice had to be made south of the 1924 lock. The reason was that it made sense to build the new lock at the site of the 1864 lock, which served as a sluice at the time. The new sluice was ready in April 1973. It meant that at the time, there were three canals at Gaarkeuken.

As for the new lock itself, in 1970, the national government said that budgets were too tight. However, in the end some other Rijkswaterstaat projects were delayed and meanwhile the province got some funding. With the blessing of Rijkswaterstaat, the province then started construction.

The dimensions of the new lock would be 190 m by 16 m by 4.77-5.20 m. The length of 190 m can be explained by that the lock had to be suitable for tugboats pushing two barges behind each other. However, it later proved that pushed barges would not become that popular in the north.

A part of the plan that was not realized was the construction of a bridge over the western gates. This would have made that there was always one bridge available for road traffic. On 16 June 1980, the new Gaarkeuken Lock was taken into use. The official opening was on 17 October 1980.

Shipping at the 1980 lock
Year	# barges	tonnage (t)	average t	# coastal
1992	17,964	17,312,000t	964t	279
1993	17,247	16,705,000t	969t	230
1994	18,761	18,564,000t	989t	148
1995	18,172	17,935,000t	987t	186
1996	16,160	17,551,000	1,000t	129
1998	14,979	15,430,000t	1,030t	72
2000	15,463	17,130,000t	1,108t	55
2002	14,329	18,746,000t	1,083t	11
2004	14,894	18,746,000t	1,259t	13

=== Rafts and coastal vessels ===
The data about shipping at the 1924 lock shows that a lot of rafts passed Gaarkeuken Lock. Numbers from the late 1940s show that on average, these consisted of a few dozen 'beams' each. Average length of the rafts was about 50 and 75 m in 1938 and 1939.

It is known that even before the Van Starkenborgh Canal was built, small coastal trading vessels regularly passed the Westerhaven Lock near the start of the Hoendiep in Groningen city. In 1932, these were 110 vessels and in 1935 88. It is not clear whether any these continued to Gaarkeuken.

The effective opening of the Van Starkenborgh Canal was on 1 September 1937. Shortly after, sea-going ships appear in the lock's statistics. In February 1938 these were 21 ships totalling 2,528GRT. After the Lemmer–Delfzijl Waterway was completed in 1951, it became popular for traffic between German North Sea harbors and the Ruhr. In 1957 2,281 mainly German coastal vessels passed the lock. Their average size was 154GRT. The use of coastal ships on the canal later declined. In 1972, only 505 coasters averaging 220GRT passed the lock.

In 1999 a study was done about whether Gaarkeuken Lock would suffice in the future. It concluded that in 2015, traffic would probably have increased by 35% compared to 1995. Gaarkeuken Lock would then still suffice. Waiting times would increase, but still be acceptable.
