= Eems Canal =

Canal in the Netherlands

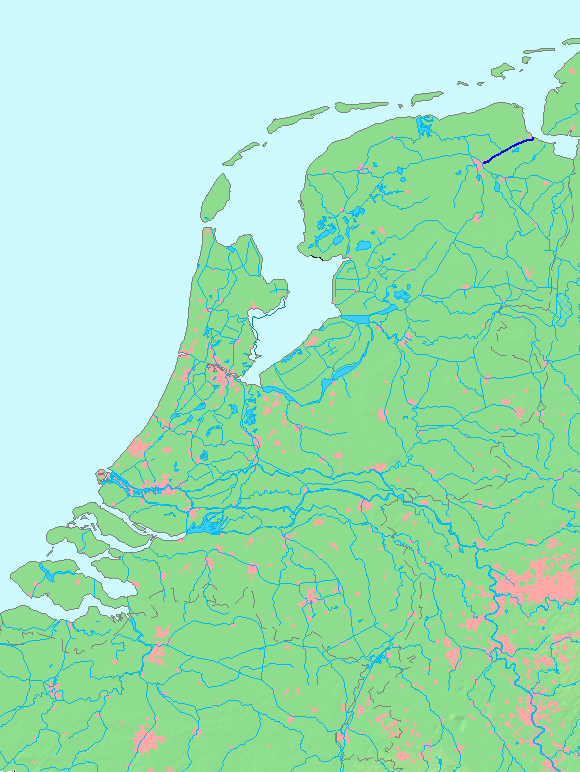
- Interactive map of Eems Canal

Specifications
- Length: 26.5 km (16.5 miles)

History
- Date completed: 15 September 1876

Geography
- Start point: Ems
- End point: Oosterhaven in Groningen

The Eems Canal in the Netherlands connects the city of Groningen to Delfzijl and the Eems. The canal was constructed between 1866 and 1876 and was upgraded in 1967.

The canal was designed as a minor ship canal and as the main canal for draining water from Drenthe and the east of Groningen province. The canal is now part of the Lemmer–Delfzijl Waterway, which is of international importance. It is also still used by coasters and vessels newly built by inland shipyards.

== History ==
=== Context ===
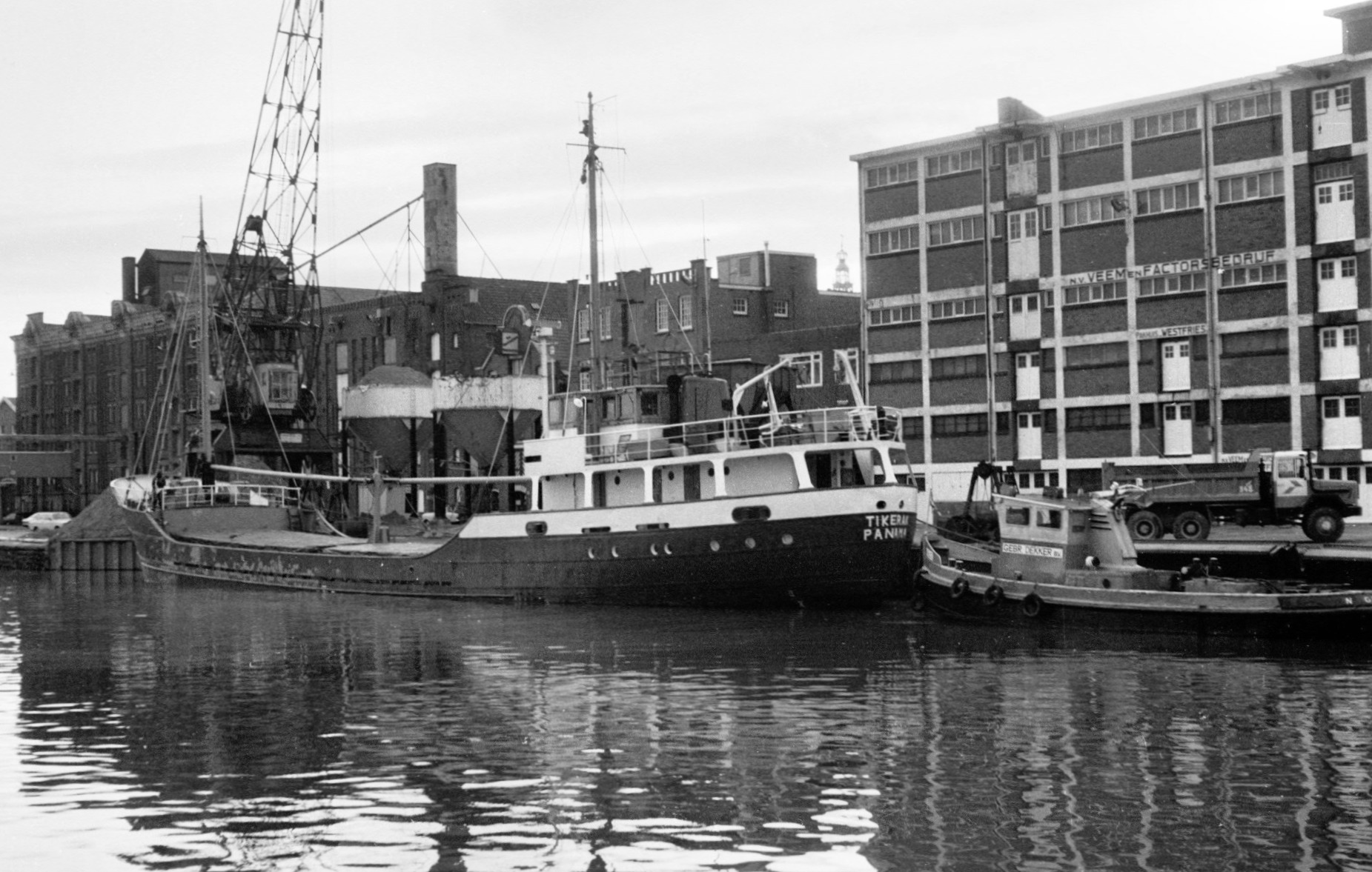
Coaster Tikerak unloading in the Oosterhaven, June 1980

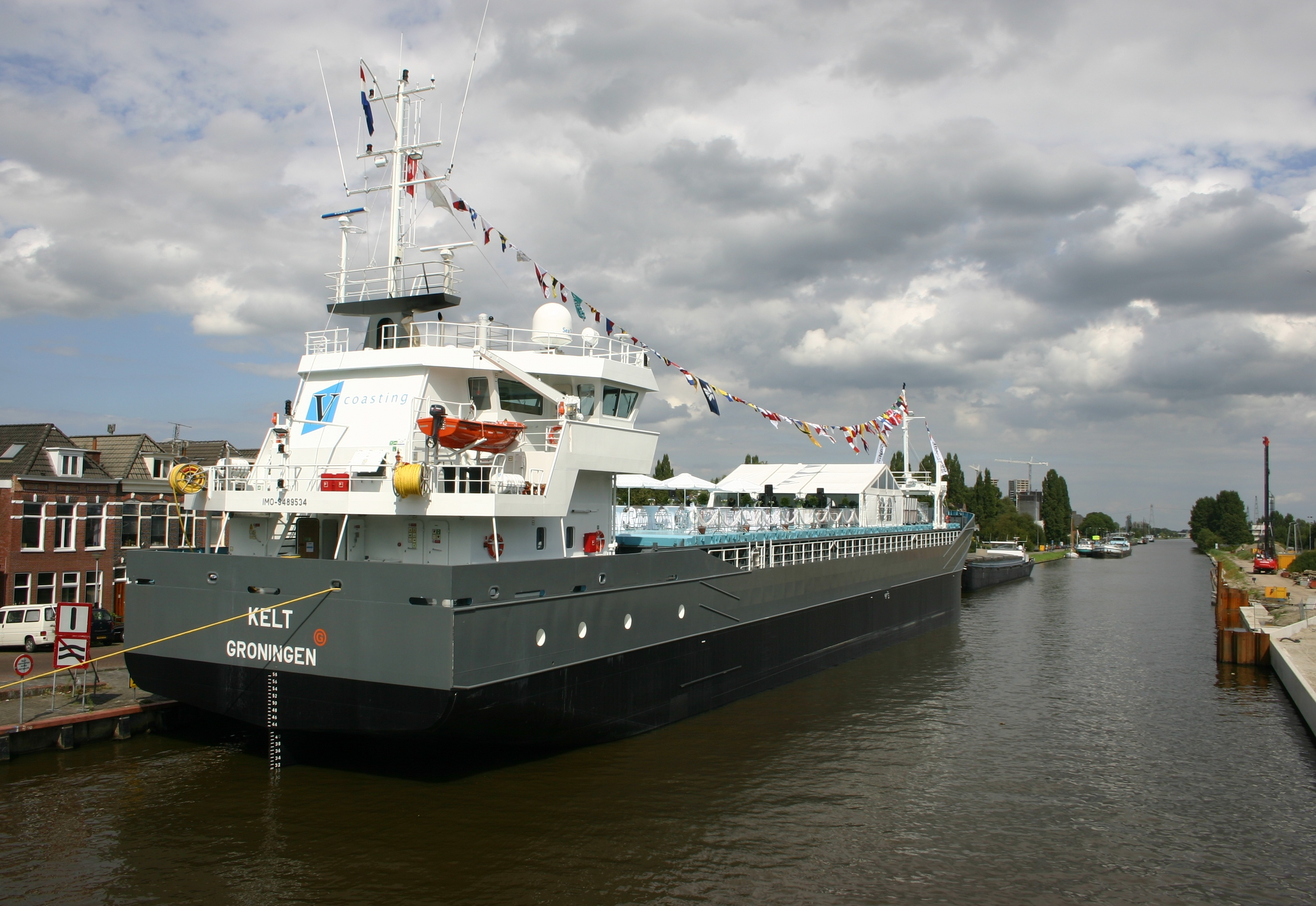
New coaster Kelt and (motor) barges in Groningen

In the early nineteenth century, the drainage of exces water became ever more problematic in the provinces of Groningen and Drenthe. This had to do with the development of the peatlands in eastern Groningen and in northeast Drenthe. This caused that these areas stored far less water in winter, and instead quickly discharged it to the Reitdiep. The Reitdiep was tidal. Plans were made to provide it with locks, but these plans were cancelled in 1833.

In 1851, a request was discussed in the Provincial Council of Groningen. It asked for a new sea port in Delfzijl, and a canal that connected it to Groningen. A commission that investigated this plan found it better to improve the existing Damsterdiep. It did recommend a new lock for barges of about 150–200 Rye lasts. The province then conferred with the national government, which ordered Rijkswaterstaat to make further plans.

In July 1856, a report was made about a general improvement of the waterways in the province. It consisted of: construction of a new canal to Delfzijl; Locks in the Reitdiep at Zoutkamp; construction of the Oosterhaven; and making a connection between the new canal, the Noord-Willems Canal, and the Hoendiep. This plan was estimated at 3,122,956 guilders. The new canal from Delfzijl would run straight to Groningen. It was to cost 1,113,400 guilders. In July 1863, parliament approved a subsidy of 1,200,000 guilders for the complete plan.

In 1863, the provincial council ordered the provincial government to start preparations for construction of the Eems Canal. This was closely followed by an approval for plans to improve the Hoendiep. In late 1865, the provincial government was mandated to tender the work on the Eems Canal.

=== Construction ===
Constructing a new canal required that works like bridges and locks were started before digging could start. In July 1867, the first stone of the new sea lock at Delfzijl was placed in the lock chamber that had been dug. The compulsory purchase of the grounds needed for the canal also took a lot of time. In March 1866, the municipality of Delfzijl started the procedure for its territory.

In time, the plans were changed to accommodate much larger vessels. The construction of the canal itself was tendered on 10 June 1870. The tender was estimated at 1,193,229 guilders and wun by H. Schram de Jong from Sliedrecht for 1,148,500 guilders. It reflected that while local authorities were planning and preparing, changes in shipping technology made that the plan had to be updated to accommodate much bigger ships.

The construction of the canal itself proved very challenging. In late November 1874 Schram de Jong & Co stopped working on the canal. The province then had to finish the canal on its own account. The canal was opened for shipping on 15 September 1876.

In spite of the canal having been opened in 1876, the provincial government had to ask for more money for the 1856 plan in The Hague. In 1877, 1878, 1879, and 1880 Groningen got 75,000 guilders each year. Finally in July 1882, it got 552,500 guilders. It brought the total subsidy for the 1856 plan to 2,052,500 guilders.

The Eems Canal suffered the worst budget overrun. Its cost came to 3,387,526.80 guilders. It was estimated that for the canal, the province paid 2,446,000 guilders, the national government 821,000, and the municipality of Groningen 120,000 guilders.

As built, the canal was about 38 m (125 ft) wide at the surface and 16 m (52 ft) at the bottom. It was 4.5 m (14 ft 9 in) deep. The Delfzijl Sea Lock was 10.50 m (34.4 ft) wide. At high tide, ships of 60 m (200 ft) length could be serviced. At ebb, maximum length was only 50 m (160 ft). The depth at the gates was 5.30 m (17 ft 5 in) on the canal side and on the sea side: 3.03 m (9 ft 11 in) at ebb. The canal had 15 bridges. These all had a passage well over 10 m (32 ft 10 in) wide.

=== First decades ===
In June 1879, the Swedish barque Israel, which drew 3.9 m (12 ft 10 in) of water, arrived in Groningen's Oosterhaven straight from South America. This made it seem as if Groningen was once again a major sea port. The numbers over 1879 showed a different picture. Oosterhaven received 165 ships from foreign harbors and sent out 132. Delfzijl received 404 ships and sent out 359. For Delfzijl, this meant a 5% decrease. However, the overall picture is that ships obviously preferred to dock at Delfzijl instead of continuing to Groningen.

In 1899, the German Dortmund–Ems Canal was opened. It runs from Emden to Dortmund Port on the Rhine. It prompted the Groningen Chamber of Commerce to order an investigation of its possible effects. The report concluded that the dimensions of the local Eems Canal were insufficient, and that this was aggravated by its use as a discharge canal. The report said that 25–30 years earlier, merchants in Groningen directly imported goods from everywhere. By 1899, almost all business in the city was retail, and the report blamed the insufficient connection to the sea.

It is not likely that a better Eems Canal would have preserved international wholesale business in Groningen. However, the canal indeed had serious shortcomings. These were its use as a drainage canal and the many bridges. The use of the canal for drainage was most problematic. Drainage often caused a current of 2–3 km/h (1.2–1.9 mph). This could only be overcome by steam tugboats. Drainage could also lower the depth at Delfzijl by up to 1.5 m (4 ft 11 in). The bridges were 15 swing bridges. These were named Draaibrug No. 1 to Draaibrug No. 15. Another swing bridge spanned the sea lock at Delfzijl. These narrow bridges and their number caused many collisions.

The early use of the Eems Canal for direct imports consisted of wood from Scandinavia, coal from England, and grain from the Baltic. Direct export consisted of grain and potatoes. This did not really change trade in Groningen city. Direct shipping lines to London, one of them by the General Steam Navigation Company failed. Lines to Amsterdam, Rotterdam, and Hamburg by the Groninger-Rotterdammer Stoomboot Maatschappij (1876–1952) were successful.

=== First half of the 20th century ===
During the Interwar period, steam ships with wood continued to use the Eems Canal. On the canal, the steamship was almost completely replaced by coasters by 1938. These were more efficient motor vessels that could easily use the canal.

=== Upgrade after World War II (1953-1967) ===
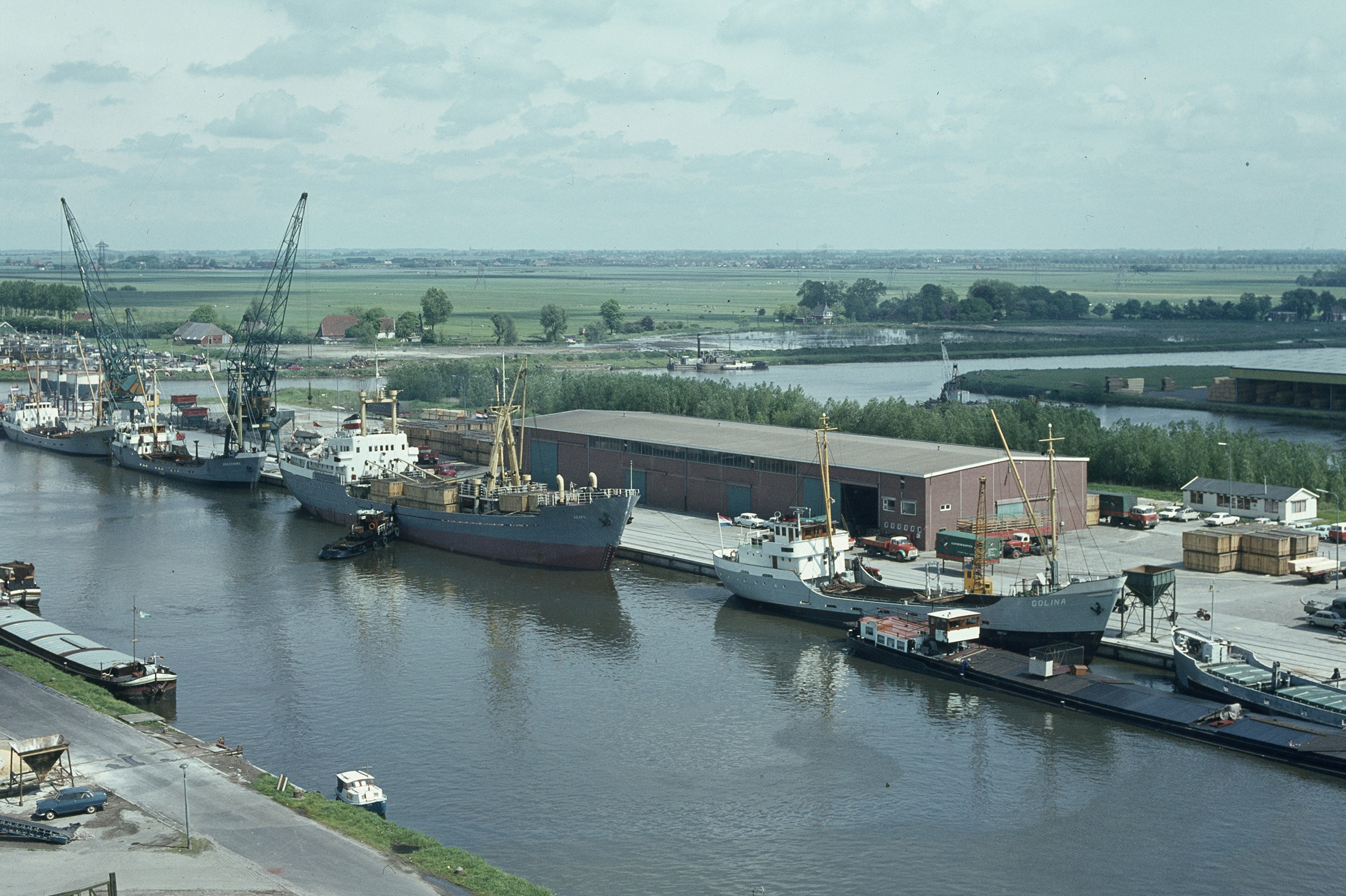
Hunze Port in Groningen, 1969

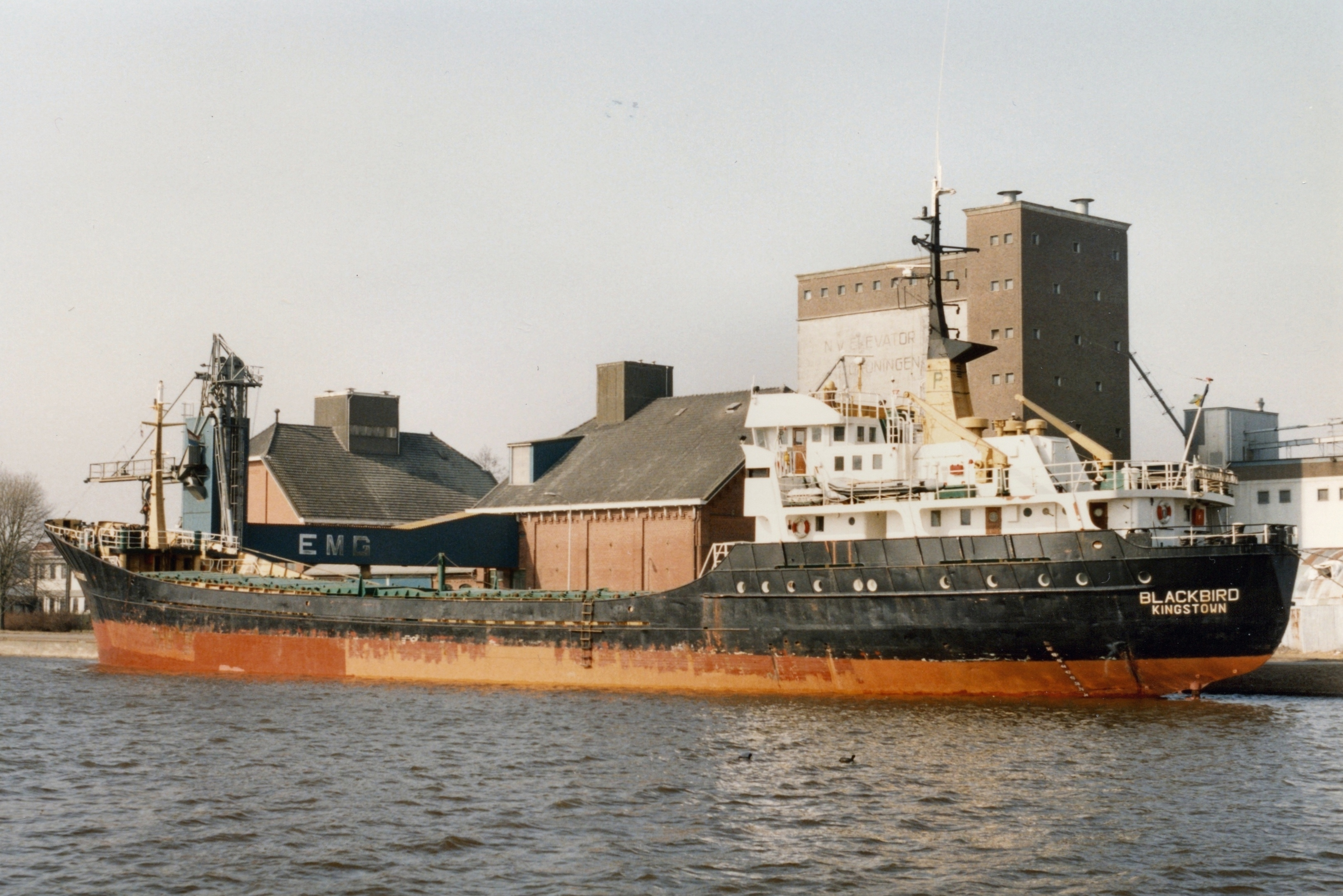
Coaster Blackbird loading grain in 1996

In 1940, the provincial government appointed a commission to improve the canal. It studied options for a canal suitable for ships of: 500 GRT (as it was), 1,000, 1,500, 2,500, or 4,000 GRT. In 1947, this commission advised the 1,000 GRT option. provincial authorities wanted to focus on the port of Delfzijl. Groningen city wanted the 1,500 GRT option. In the end, the national government advised a canal somewhat wider than required for 1,500 GRT ships.

The success of the coaster restored significant use of the Eems Canal by sea-going ships. In 1953 the plans to upgrade the Eems Canal were approved. The bottom of the canal would become 24 m (79 ft) wide. The depth would be increased to 5.2 m (17 ft 1 in) in Groningen and 5.8 m (19 ft 0 in) in Delfzijl. In Delfzijl, its maximum width would become 60 m (200 ft). Passage width would become 16 m (52 ft). This wider passage would allow local shipyards to build ships of up to 5,000–6,000 tonnes (4,900–5,900 long tons). Total cost was estimated at 35 million, of which two-thirds would be paid by the national government. Traffic on the canal increased from 1,100,000 t (1,100,000 long tons) in 1950 to 7,900,000 t (7,800,000 long tons) in 1966.

At Delfzijl, the plan became part of a wider plan to upgrade the harbor of Delfzijl. A new section of the canal would exit into the Ems somewhat further to the east. Here, the new Farmsum Sea Lock would be made, while the old lock would continue to be used for drainage. The new sea lock was opened in April 1959. It actually consisted of a big and a small lock. The big lock also got the increased width of 16 m. This was more than required for the 1,500 GRT, but was in line with new inland navigation requirements for the Lemmer–Delfzijl Waterway. The depth on the canal side became 6.07 m (19 ft 11 in). At the sea side, this was 3.80 m (12 ft 6 in) above average ebb level. The length of the lock chamber was 120 m (390 ft). It became 151 m (495 ft) at high tide.

To fully profit from the upgraded canal, the municipality of Groningen built a new harbor. This was first called Eemshaven. Due to confusion with the later Eemshaven north of Delfzijl, it was renamed to 'Haven Eemskanaal' and still later Hunze Port (Hunzehaven). It was taken into use on 28 October 1965.

On 27 June 1967, the official opening of the canal was done by the Minister of Infrastructure and Water Management Joop Bakker. Cost of the improvement was 55 million guilders. The new canal was suitable for ships of 1,500 t capacity with a maximum draught of 4.50 m (14 ft 9 in). Barges of 2,000 t could use it to reach Groningen from Delfzijl. Another measure to increase suitability was the reduction of the number of bridges. These were now only three. Each had a passage of 16 m wide.

The improvement of the canal in 1967 did not lead to an increase in the number of ships on the canal. It did lead to bigger ships being used. A highlight of these were the Russian Sormovskiy vessels of 2,925 tons deadweight (DWT), which exported cars straight from Tolyatti on the Volga. By the late 1980s, the Eems Canal had lost much of its function as a ship canal towards Groningen city. It led to the privatization of the municipal port of Groningen.

The widespread use of containers in inland navigation came up at about the same that coasters seemed to be leaving the Eems Canal. In 1995, this led to the establishment of an inland container terminal in the Groningen's Hunze Port. The owner was MCS (Multimodel Container Services).

== Current significance and dimensions ==
=== As part of the Lemmer-Delfzijl Waterway ===
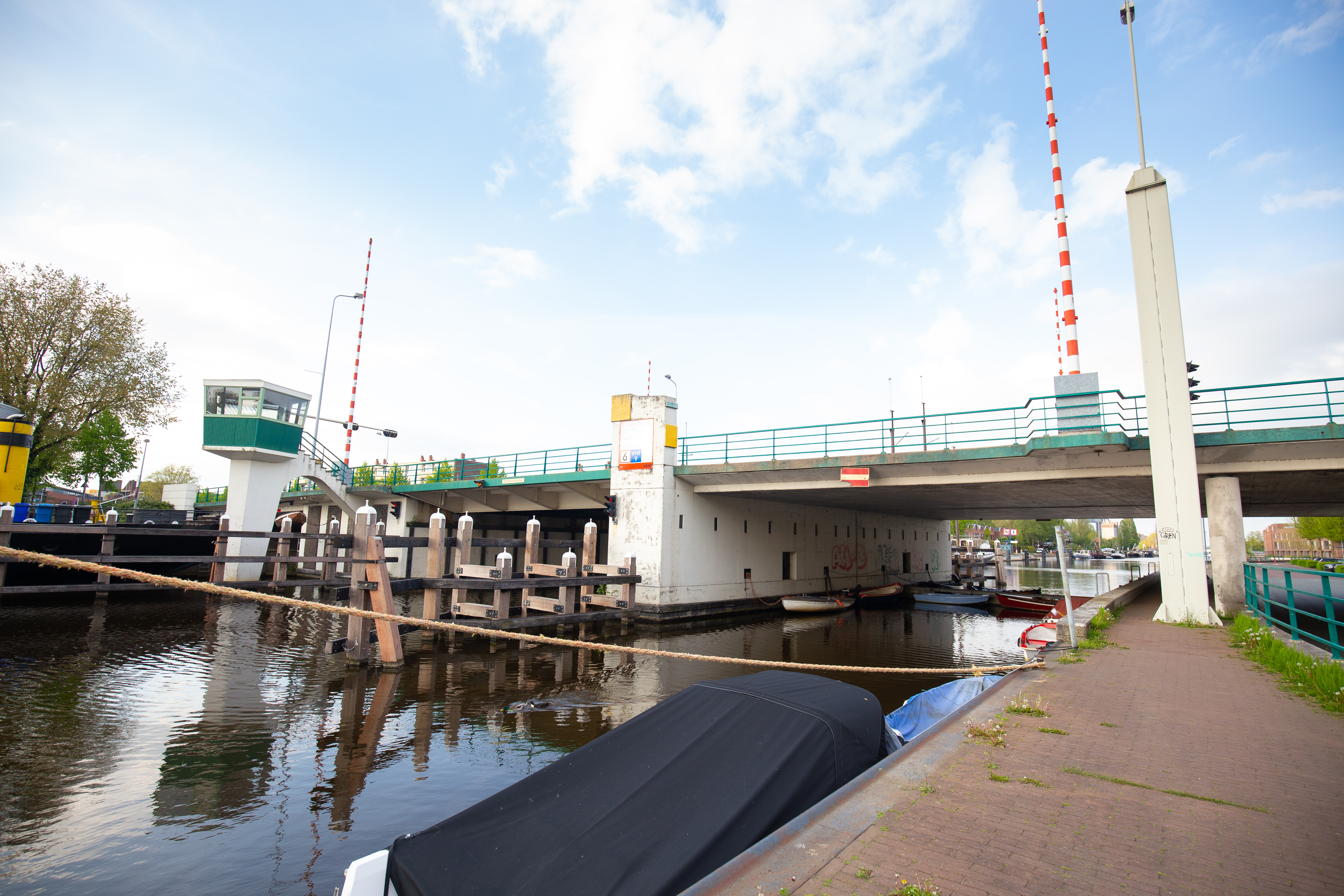
Oosterhaven Bridge in 2021

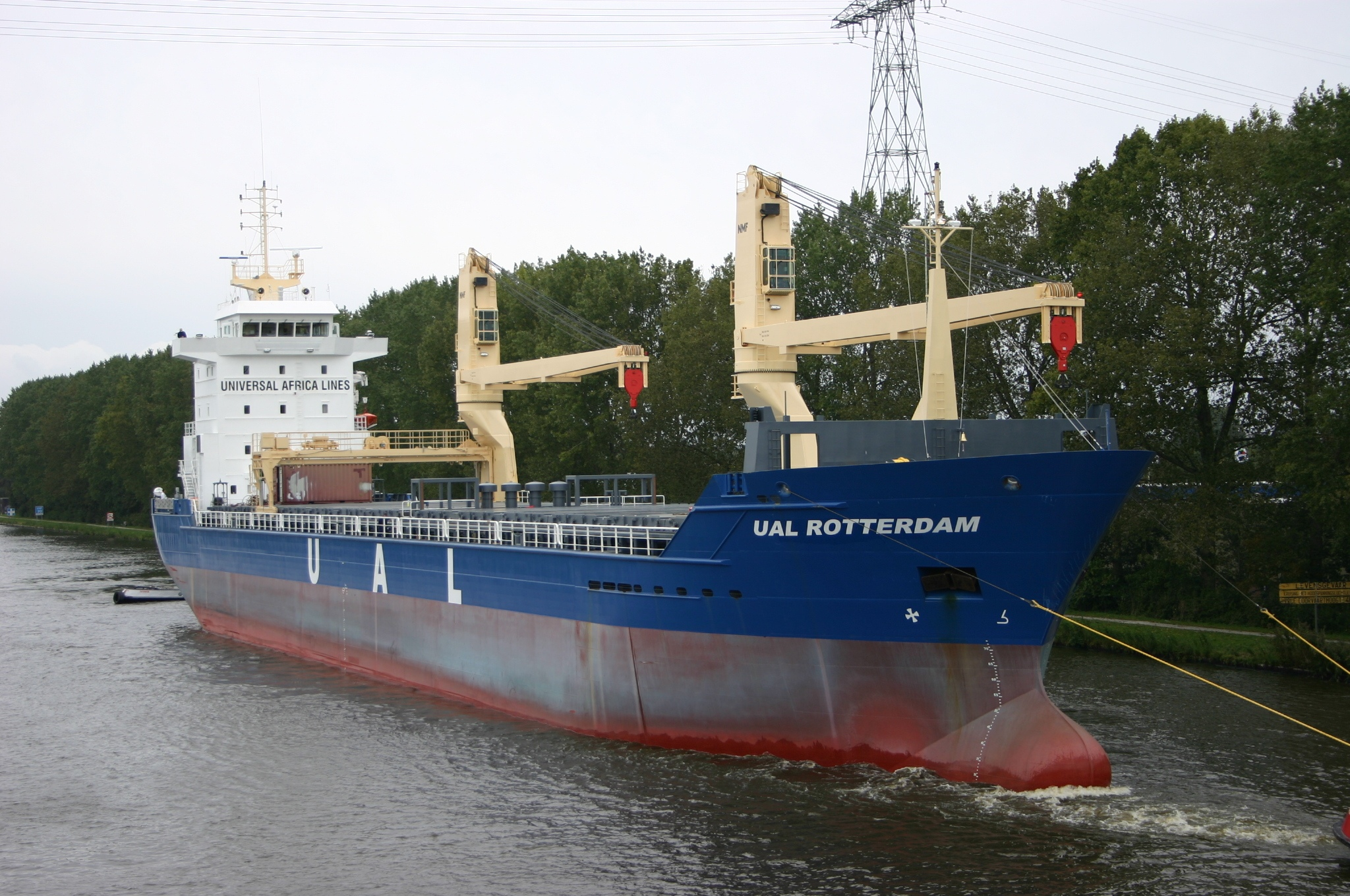
Newly built UAL Rotterdam on the canal

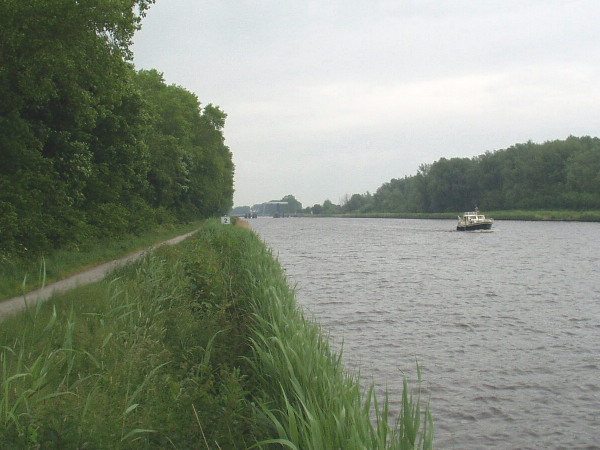
Near Ruischerwaard, the Borg Bridge in the distance

The Eems Canal is now part of the Lemmer-Delfzijl Waterway. This is one of the most important Dutch waterways. It connects Rotterdam and Amsterdam to Friesland, Groningen, and northern Germany. As a modern waterway, the Lemmer-Delfzijl Waterway came into existence by the construction of the Van Starkenborgh Canal in 1937 and finally, the Prinses Margriet Canal in 1951. As the Van Starkenborgh Canal connects to the Eems Canal, this created a good connection from northern Germany to the Rhine.

On 1 January 2014, the ownership of the canal was transferred to the state. To handle the growth of traffic on the waterway, Rijkswaterstaat started a program to make the Van Starkenborgh Canal and Prinses Margriet Canal wider and deeper, so CEMT class Va ships could pass quickly. In 2021, Rijkswaterstaat published some conclusions about the bridges (see below) on the canal. The Borg Bridge, Bloemhof Bridge, and Wold Bridge did not suffice, because they were too low and had only a single passage of 16 m. The Eelwerder Bridge was too low, causing that it had to be opened too often. The movable bridges also lacked mooring points. These were important in case the bridges malfunctioned.

=== As a minor ship canal ===
By 2025, the Eems Canal is still important as a minor ship canal. It allows the shipyards in eastern Groningen to bring their new sea-going vessels to the sea. The number coastal vessels that still uses the canal for commercial shipping is low.

=== Current dimensions ===
In 2025, the canal was 26.4 kilometres (16.4 mi) long and 60 m wide. There were 7 bridges over the canal, and it had one lock, Farmsum Sea Lock.

From Groningen to Delfzijl, the canal was spanned by these bridges in 2025: Near Groningen city, the bascule Oosterhaven Bridge is only 14.00 m (45 ft 11 in) wide. East of it, the movable Berlage Bridge is only 12.00 m (39 ft 4 in) wide. However, these bridges are both west of the junction with the Van Starkenborgh Canal and the Winschoterdiep. This makes them less important.

The Driebond Bridge in the N46 road has a fixed part that is 22.67 m (74 ft 5 in) wide and 6.96 m (22 ft 10 in) high. Its movable part is 22.04 m (72 ft 4 in) wide. The movable Borg Bridge is only 16.10 m (52 ft 10 in) wide. This also applies to the movable Bloemhof Bridge at Overschild. The Eelwerder Bridge at Appingedam has a bascule part with a width of 18.96 m (62 ft 2 in) and a fixed part with a width of 18.90 m (62 ft 0 in) and a height of 5.37 m (17 ft 7 in).

In Delfzijl, Farmsum Sea Lock has gates of 16.00 and 7.00 metres (52 ft 6 in and 23 ft 0 in) width. Bridge 15 in Farmsum retains its original name. It spans the old arm of the canal and is a movable 16.00 m wide bridge. The Haven Bridge over the old lock is movable and 12.00 m wide. Two more movable bridges give access to the Oosterhorn Port.
