= Lemmer–Delfzijl Waterway =

Waterway in the Netherlands

Hoofdvaarweg Lemmer–Delfzijl
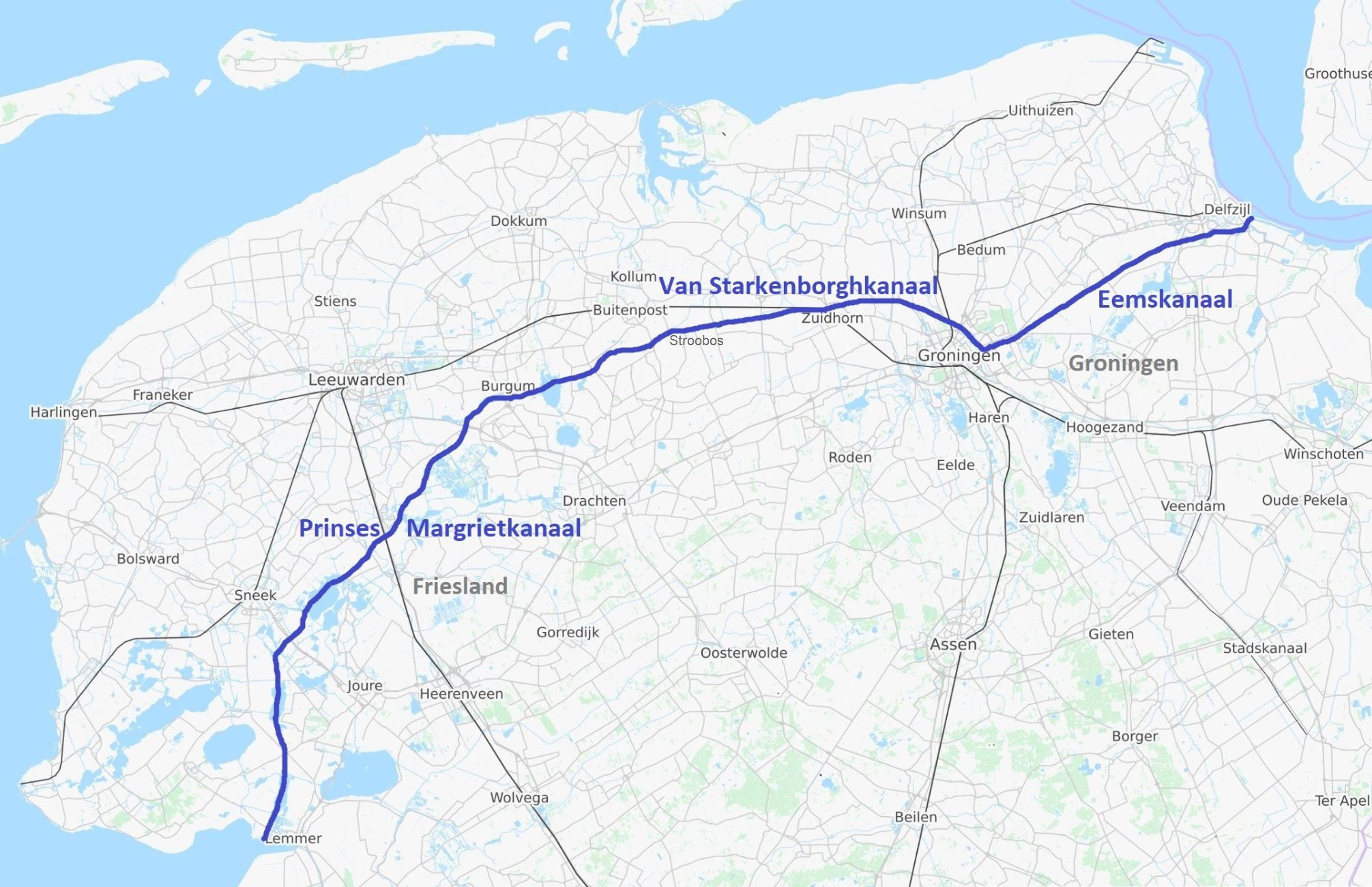
- Country: Netherlands

Specifications
- Length: 118 km (73 miles)

Geography
- Start point: IJsselmeer at Lemmer
- End point: Eems at Delfzijl

Lemmer–Delfzijl Waterway in Dutch Hoofdvaarweg Lemmer-Delfzijl (HLD) is a main waterway in the Netherlands. It runs between Lemmer and Delfzijl in the provinces Friesland and Groningen. It consists of the minor ship canal Eems Canal, the Van Starkenborgh Canal and the Prinses Margriet Canal.

== History ==
=== Initial construction ===
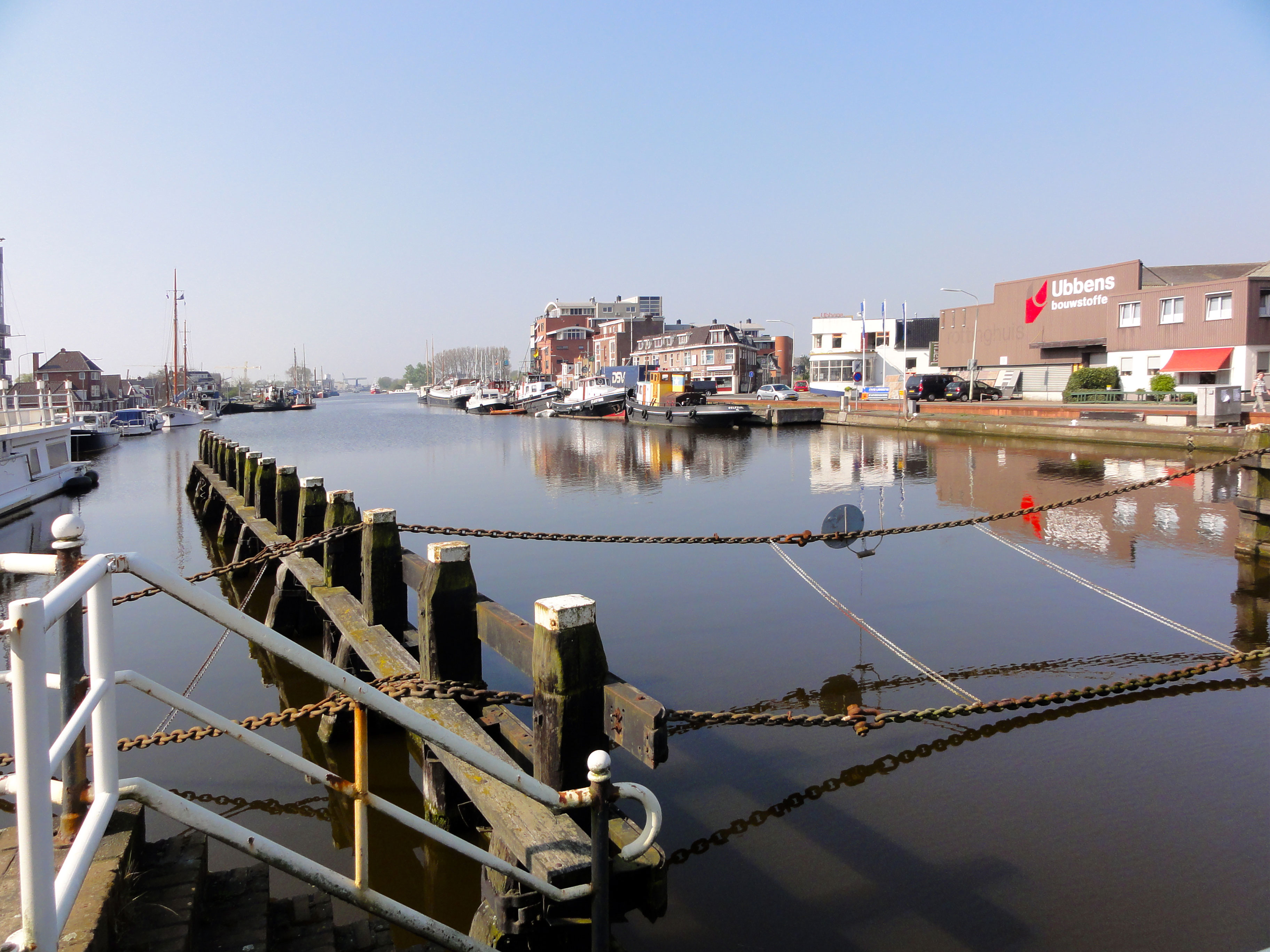
Original start of the Eems Canal in Delfzijl

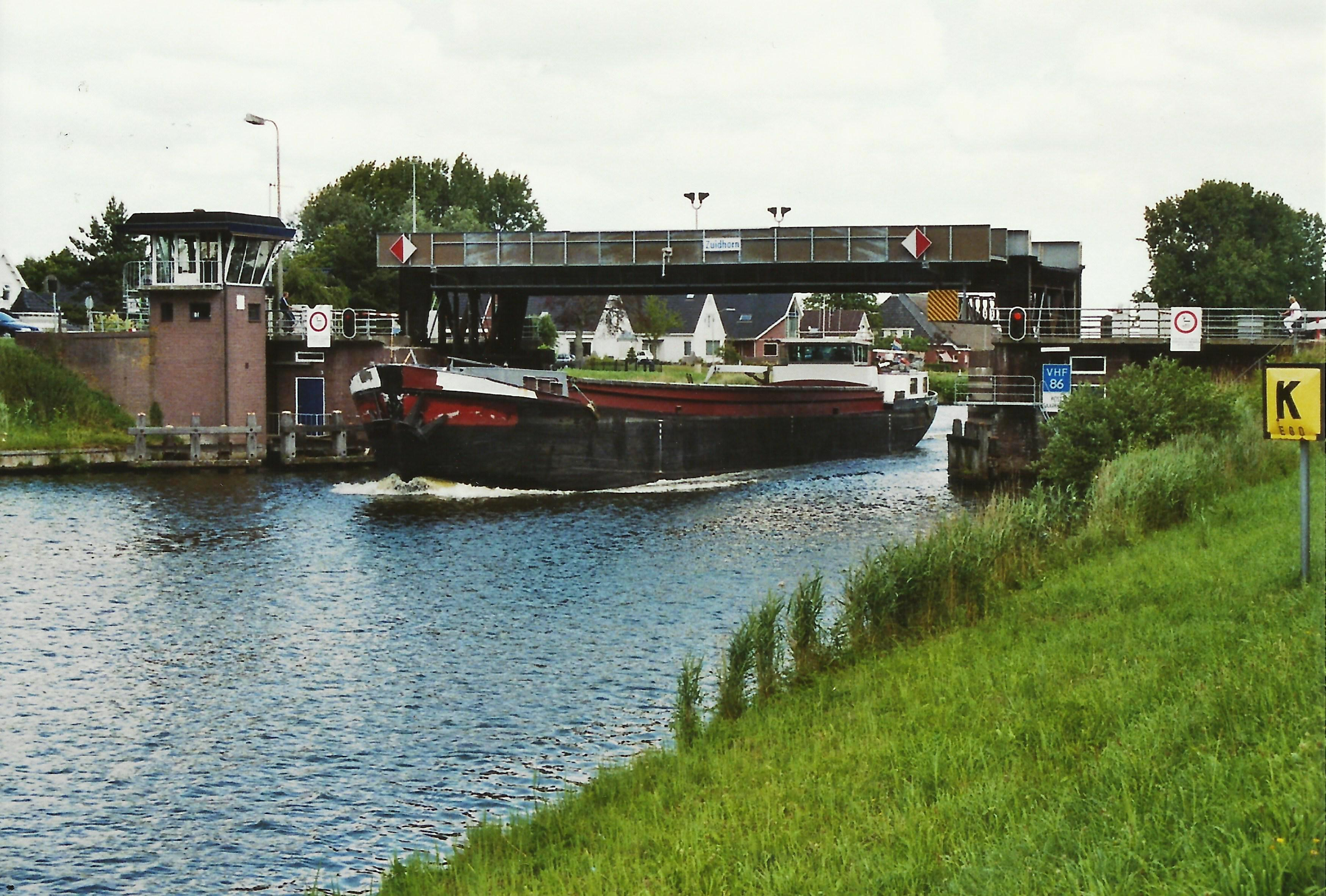
Old bridge at Zuidhorn, now replaced. See below.

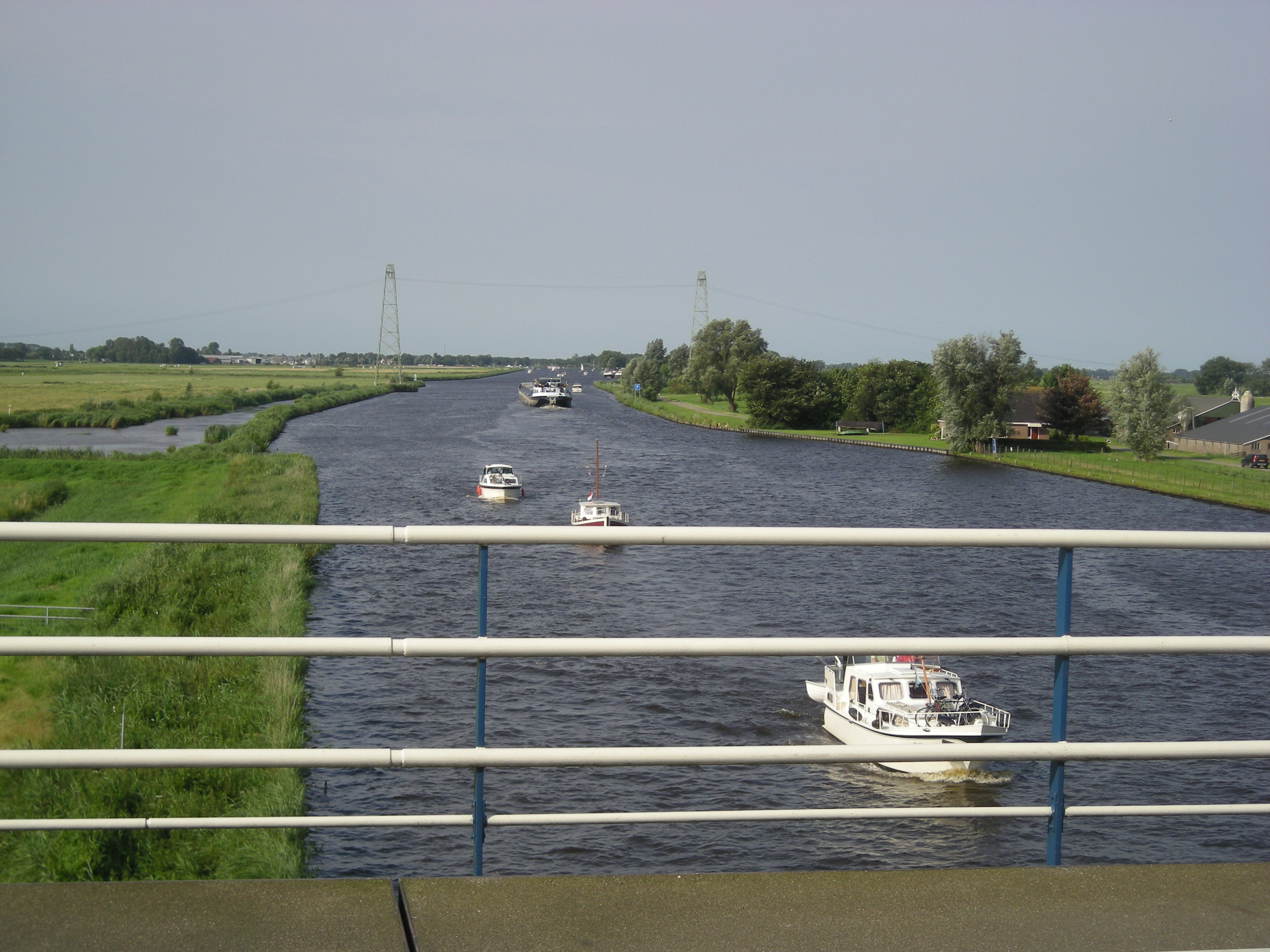
Prinses Margriet Canal near Oude Schouw

The Lemmer–Delfzijl Waterway was constructed in three sections. As built, these had nothing to do with navigating the whole stretch from Lemmer to Delfzijl.

In 1876 the Eems Canal was opened. It was constructed as a drainage canal and ship canal to revitalize Groningen city as a sea harbor.

In 1900, the maximum size of barges that could use the existing waterway from Groningen to Friesland was only 120-140t. In 1929, Groningen and the national government agreed to upgrade this waterway using a new trajectory. Groningen then went ahead and constructed the newly dug Van Starkenborgh Canal, suitable for 1,000t barges. In 1937 the canals that are now the Van Starkenborgh Canal were opened.

Friesland was very hesitant to cooperate. It viewed the whole plan as something that did not serve and would even hurt its own interests. It therefore obstructed the plan till the national government agreed to also pay for the simultaneous construction of the Van Harinxmakanaal. This would lead from Harlingen via Leeuwarden to the new waterway. The Frisian part of the Lemmer–Delfzijl waterway was opened in 1951. It was later named Prinses Margriet Canal.

=== The waterway as an international connection ===
The opening of the new Lemmer-Groningen waterway in 1951 led to a significant increase in traffic. Traffic at Gaarkeuken Lock on the border between Groningen and Friesland increased from 2,860,000t in 1952 to almost 11,000,000t in 1964. Of course, most vessels on the Lemmer-Groningen waterway were barges, but it was also used by small coastal trading vessels. In the 1950s, the latter formed about 5% of the volume served by Gaarkeuken Lock.

The small coastal trading vessels on the canal were interesting, because they used the whole stretch between Lemmer and Delfzijl. Most went from the German North Sea ports to the Ruhr. In July 1957, the Lock- and bridges taxes on the canal were cancelled. This made the waterway even more attractive for international transport. In 1960, 80% of the coasters at Gaarkeuken were German, these measured 270,346GRT. Of the barges, 5.4% were German, measuring 1,093,258t.

=== The idea of a single waterway ===
By the early 1960s the term 'Lemmer–Delfzijl waterway' could be heard now and then. In 1964, night traffic was finally allowed on the Eems Canal, so the 'whole Lemmer–Delfzijl waterway' could be used around the clock. By 1990, the upgrade of the Prinses Margriet Canal and Van Starkenborgh Canal was discussed and decided in the context of making the Lemmer-Delfzijl waterway suitable for 2,000t barges (CEMT Va) and two-barge pushboats (CEMT Vb).

The notion that the three canals were part of a main waterway between the west of the country and Delfzijl became official when the government approved the Tweede Structuurschema Verkeer en Vervoer in 1991. This was a high level plan for Dutch transport. It stated that the route from Amsterdam to Delfzijl should be made suitable for CEMT-class V barges.

As a consequence of this policy, Rijkswaterstaat took over management of the waterway on 1 January 2014. In March 2021, the milestones on the canal were changed. Up till then the marker for '0 km' stood in Groningen. This was now moved to Delfzijl, while Lemmer got the 119.5 km marker.

== Characteristics of the Lemmer–Delfzijl Waterway ==
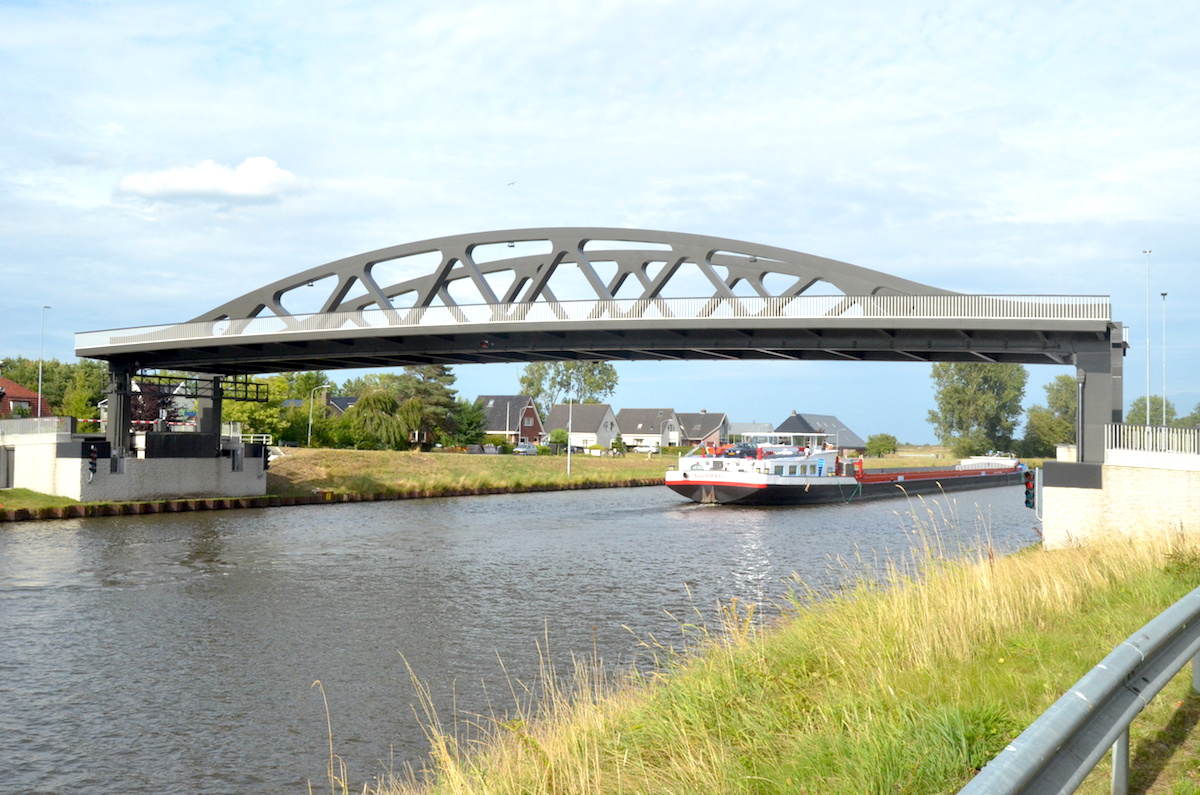
New full width movable bridge in Zuidhorn

The Lemmer–Delfzijl Waterway starts at the IJsselmeer locks in Lemmer. From there, it follows the Prinses Margriet Canal and the Van Starkenborgh Canal to enter the Eems Canal somewhat east of Groningen city.

The waterway is an important Dutch waterway and a cornerstone of the economy of the Northern Netherlands. Is serves to connect the west of the country to Friesland and Groningen, and connects Amsterdam and Rotterdam to northern Germany.

=== CEMT class Va classification ===
Despite the 1991 decision, the waterway was officially still not suitable for CEMT class Va vessels (110–135 by 11.4 m with a maximum draft of 3.5 m) in 2025. Many things had been done. Bridges had been replaced and the canals had been made wider and deeper. However, by 2025 there were still 5 major things to be done:

- Replacement of Gerrit Krol Bridge (2026–2029)
- Replacement of Kootstertille Bridge (2028–2030)
- Replacement of Oude Schouw Bridge (2027–2029)
- Replacement of Uitwellingerga Bridge (2027–2029)
- Replacement of Spannenburg Bridge (2027–2029)

Part of the delay had to do with the difference between a canal being technically suitable for CEMT-class Va barges and it being functionally suitable. While the waterway is officially not suitable for class Va barges, barges of this category actually form the most numerous category of barges at the Prinses Margriet Lock in Lemmer.

In 2018, Dutch authorities determined that the canal would not be made suitable for two-barge pushboats (CEMT Vb: 186.5 by 11.4 by 4.0 m). They also agreed on specifications for the part between Gaarkeuken Lock and Groningen. The whole stretch had to be wide enough for two class Va barges to pass each other. It had to be 54 m wide on straight sections and 4.9 m deep over a width of 22.8 m. Fixed bridges would be the norm. These had to span the whole of the canal without intermediate supports and have a clearance of 9.1 m. Movable bridges had to meet these same specifications when open. The bridges in Friesland had to meet a different specification. Here, movable bridges had to be 19 m wide and fixed bridges had to be 22 m wide. In 2025, the movable parts of Kootstertille Bridge, Oudeschouw bridge, Uitwellingerga Bridge, and Spannenburg Bridge ranged in width between 11.96 and 12.10 m.
