= Burgumer Mar =

Lake in Friesland

- Location within Netherlands Location within Friesland

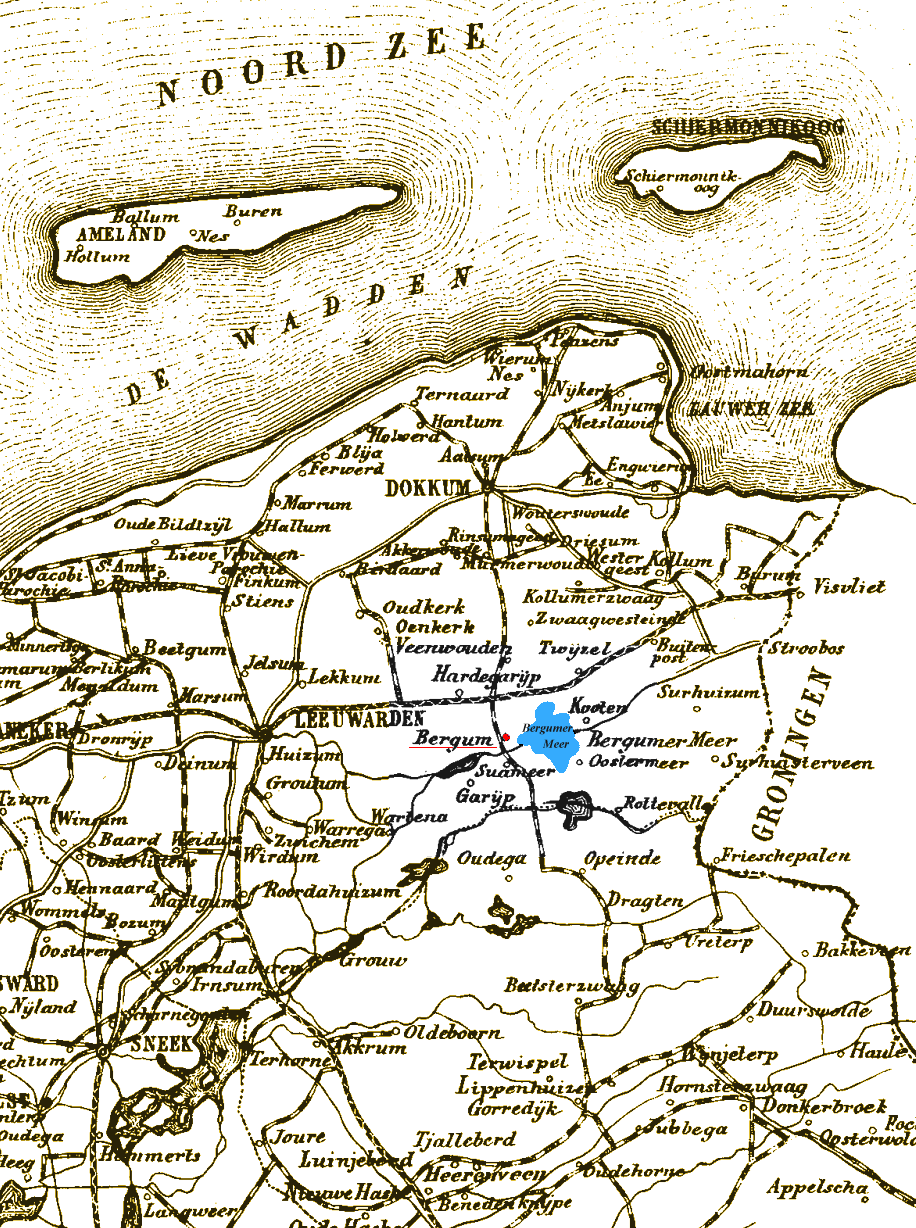
- Location: Friesland
- Coordinates: 53°11′30″N 6°02′30″E
- Basin countries: Netherlands
- Surface area: 360 ha (890 acres)

The Burgumer Mar (Dutch: Bergumermeer) is a lake near the town of Burgum in the Dutch province of Friesland. The lake was formed during the last ice age. It is a popular water sports area with multiple yacht harbours. The Prinses Margriet Canal splits the lake into a northern and southern part.

Since March 15, 2007, the West Frisian name Burgumer Mar is the official name; before that date the Dutch name was the official one). The villages Jistrum, Eastermar and Sumar together with Burgum border the lake.
