= Prinses Margriet Canal =

Canal in Friesland, Netherlands

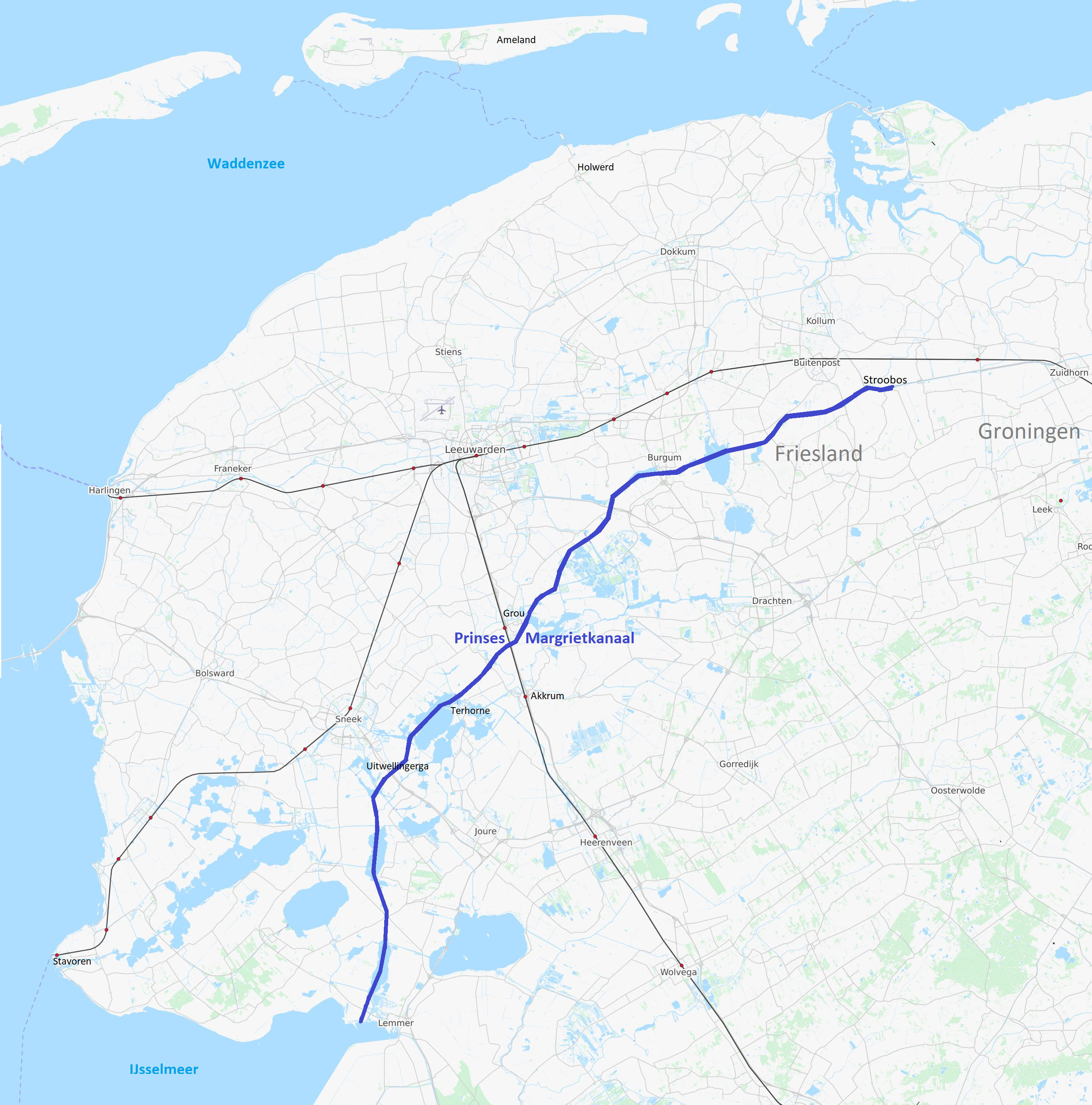

Specifications
- Length: 64.5 km (40.1 miles)

History
- Date completed: 30 May 1951

Geography
- Start point: IJsselmeer near Lemmer; 52°50′43″N 5°40′23″E
- End point: Van Starkenborgh Canal near Stroobos; 53°14′20″N 6°13′26″E

The Prinses Margriet Canal (Dutch: Prinses Margrietkanaal) is a canal in Friesland, Netherlands. It is now part of the Lemmer–Delfzijl Waterway, that forms an inland connection between Rotterdam and northern Germany.

The canal was constructed in the interests of Groningen and the ports of Amsterdam and Rotterdam. It was effectively paid for by the Dutch state and Groningen province. Friesland initially opposed the construction, leading to severe delays.

== History ==
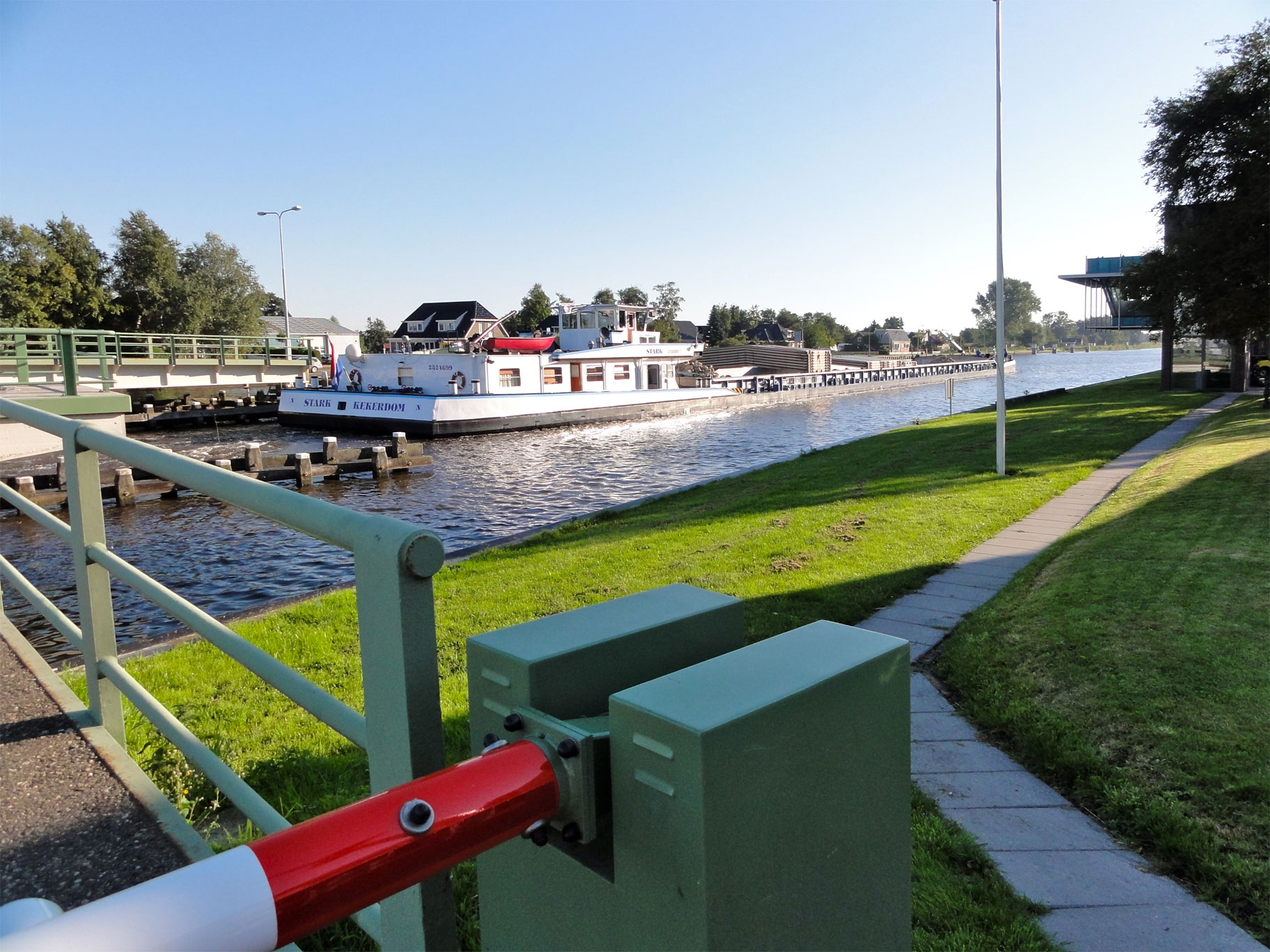
Prinses Margriet Canal near Skûlenboarch

In 1911, Dutch authorities appointed a commission to improve the waterway from Groningen to Lemmer. In 1917 it recommended that the waterway should be upgraded for barges of 67 by 8.20 by 2 m, just like the Dortmund–Ems Canal. This would increase the maximum size of barges on the canal from 120–140t to 600–800t.

Groningen went ahead by constructing Gaarkeuken Lock, which was finished in 1924. In 1927 Groningen agreed on a new plan to meet government demands that the whole waterway would be suitable for 1,000t barges. Groningen then constructed a new canal called Van Starkenborgh Canal and upgraded a section of the Hoendiep which later got the same name. On 1 September 1937 these sections were opened for shipping.

In November 1929 Rijkswaterstaat authorities agreed on a plan for the sections of the Groningen–Lemmer waterway in Friesland, which would actually end at Stavoren. To compensate Friesland, the later Van Harinxmakanaal was planned between Harlingen and the new canal at Fonejacht. The plan called for the canals to be suitable for 1,000t barges, i.e. of 80 by 9.20 by 2.40 m with a height of 6.75 m. However, the compulsory purchase of grounds for the Prinses Margriet Canal would take expansion to 2,000t barges into account.

=== Opposition to the canal in Friesland ===
For Friesland the Prinses Margriet Canal seemed to have only limited value. There were no significant Frisian population centers on its trajectory and the canal seemed to threaten the position of Harlingen as a sea port. Others said that Harlingen was only reachable for 1,700t ships and was therefore anyway insufficient for Friesland. In the end, Friesland decided to oppose the plans unless the Van Harinxmakanaal would be constructed and finished at the same time.

The repartition of the cost for the canal is interesting. The national government would bear all of the compulsory purchase cost and the extra cost for letting the canal end at Stavoren instead of Lemmer. The national government would pay 2/3 of the construction cost. Groningen would have to pay one-third of the construction cost for the section between Noordhorn and the provincial border. For the section from the border to Stavoren, Groningen would pay 4/15 and Friesland 1/15. For the Van Harinxma canal, Groningen would pay 1/15 and Friesland 4/15 of the construction cost.

While the November 1929 plan and the repartition of the cost meant that Friesland would get the Prinses Margriet Canal almost for free, it still opposed the plans. The primary reason for doing so was that the Prinses Margriet Canal would be opened in 1937 and the Van Harinxma Canal only in 1951. Frisian merchants were afraid that during the delay, trade would leave Harlingen, especially if Leeuwarden would be connected to the canal.

Apart from the position of Harlingen, Friesland had another reason to oppose the plans. In 1932, a small barge of 170t paid 32.45 guilders to sail the canal from Lemmer to the border with Groningen. More than 2/3 of this were canal taxes, which were unknown in the center and south of the country, and unknown on canals maintained by the state. In 1934, Friesland province had an income of 8,328,989 guilders. That same year, it collected 304,099 guilders for use of its canals. Between Lemmer and the border at Stroobos, this was 158,997 guilders. No wonder that Friesland wanted to collect taxes on the new canal.

In February 1934, the provincial government agreed to the plans after the national government promised to complete both canals at the same time. It seemed a complete victory for Friesland. One of the stipulations was that the national government and the province would jointly investigate whether the canal would end at Stavoren or Lemmer. However, the minister would decide. The provincial assembly was still very content with the proposal, but it noted that the interests of Sneek and IJlst would probably not be served, even if the minister chose to let the canal go to Stavoren. On 26 July 1934, the provincial assembly approved the plan.

== Construction ==
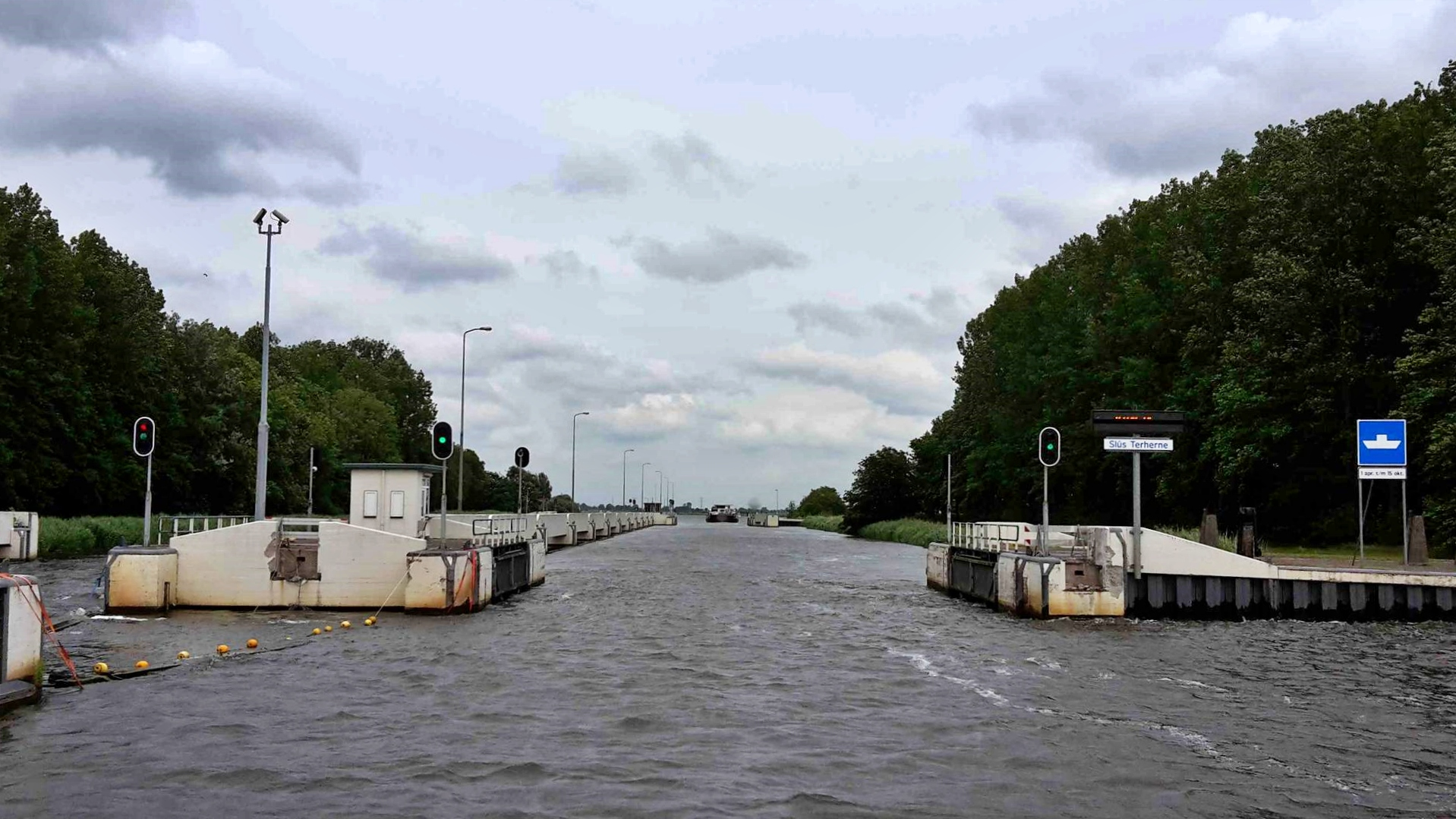
Terherne Lock

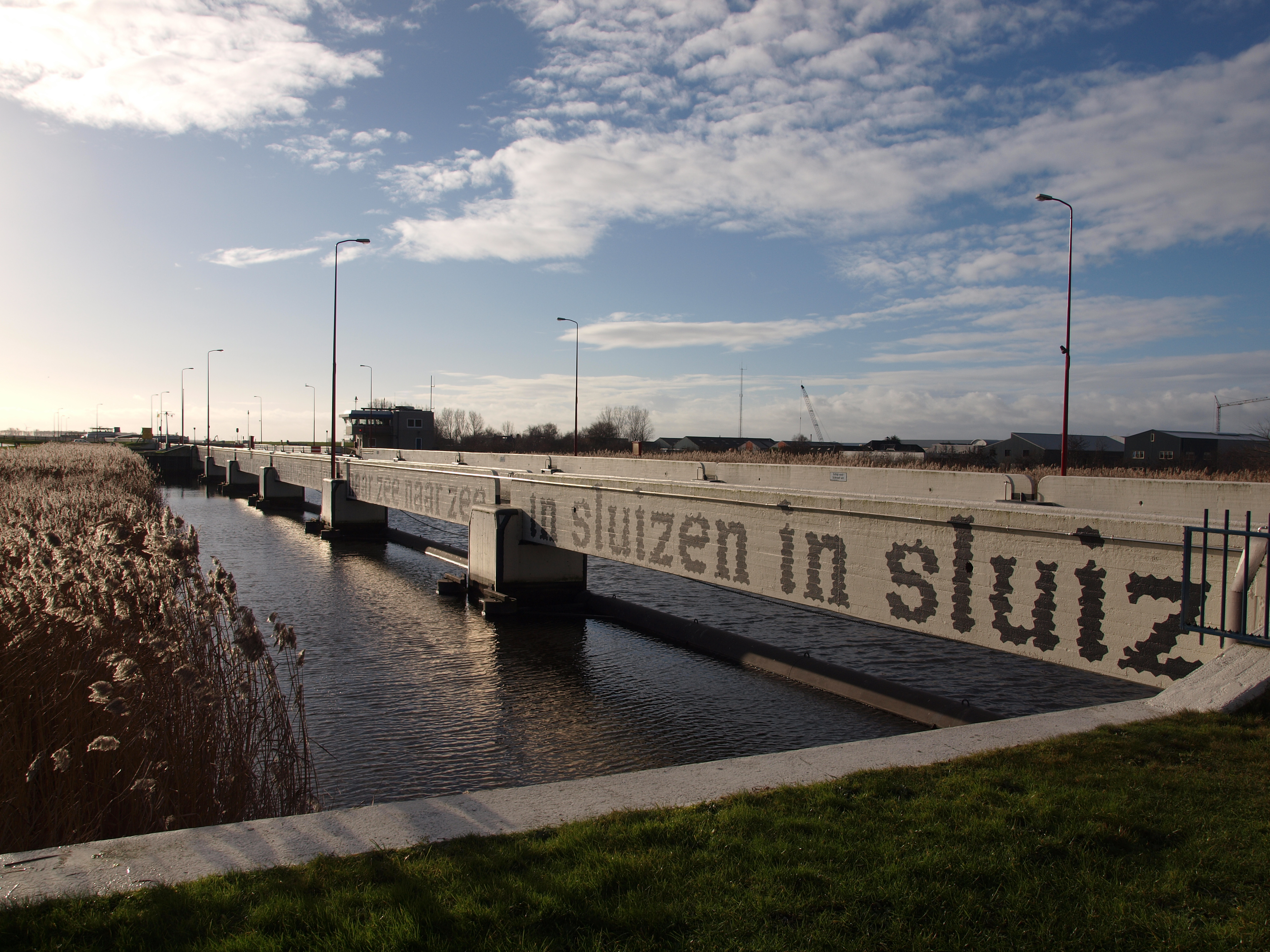
Prinses Margriet Locks in Lemmer

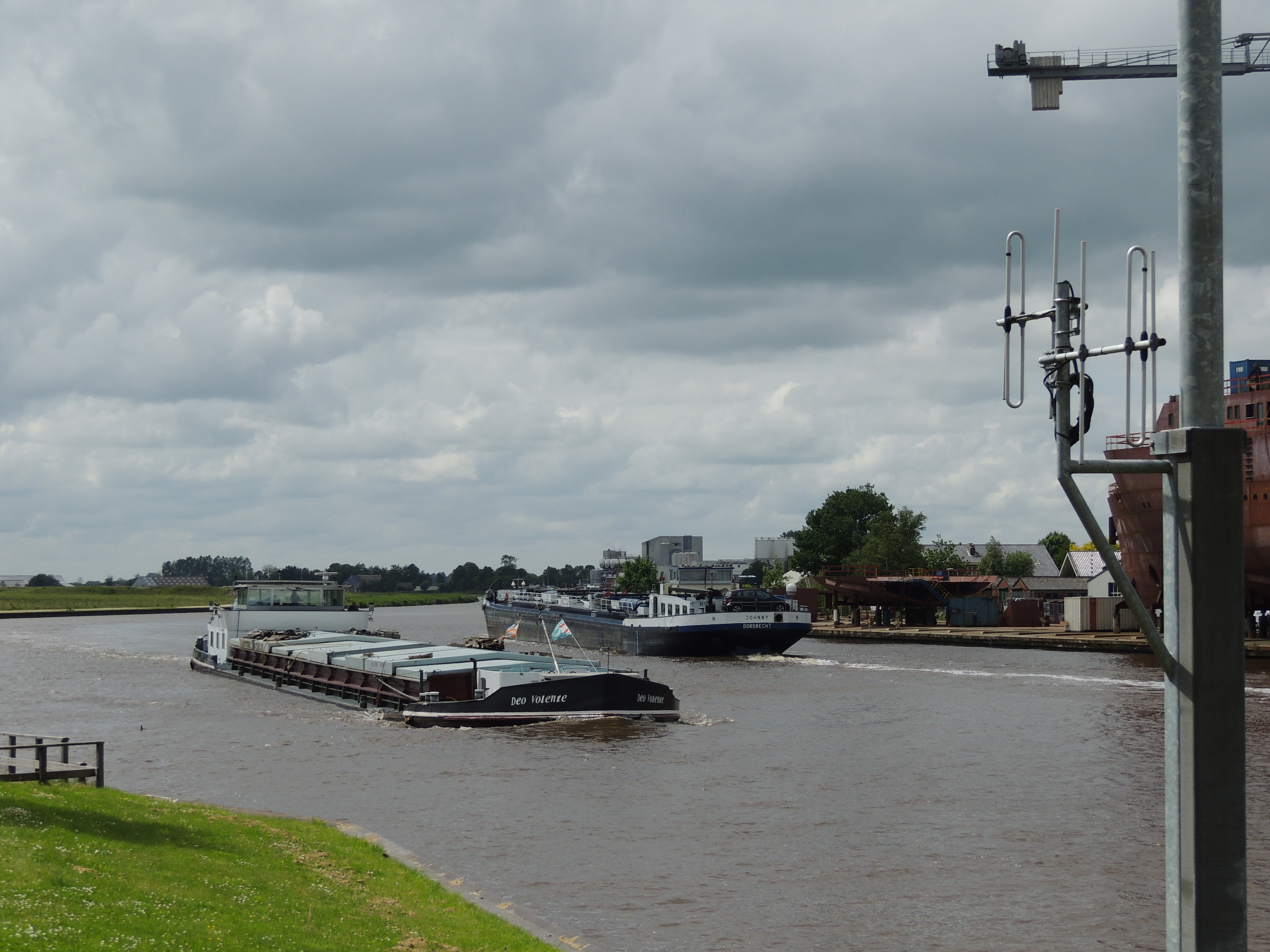
Shipyard and barges on the canal near Stroobos

In April 1935, a provincial service for the improvement of the waterways Stroobos–IJsselmeer and Fonejacht–Harlingen was founded. In October 1935, it started negotiation to acquire land near the Wijde Ee and Lange Meer (SW of Suwâld). The plan was to start with the parts that only consisted of upgrading existing canals and where no design choices had to be made. This also applied to a part of the Harlingertrekvaart near Deinum. In January 1936, dredging and making dams in the Bergumermeer was tendered. It was the first of many tenders.

On 15 April 1938, the decision that the Prinses Margriet Canal would end at Lemmer became known. Friesland wanted this. Shortly before, Groningen had objected to Lemmer and complained about the procrastination in Friesland. Groningen was frustrated by the slow progress of the project and the national government changing the plans. In December 1938 it threatened to no longer keep its part of the 1929 deal. In January 1939, the Groningen provincial assembly agreed with deputy E.H. Ebels that it now seemed as if the Van Harinxma Canal would be finished first. The assembly agreed to renegotiate Groningen's part of the deal.

In January 1939, the section between Stroobos and Fonejacht was almost complete. Another part of the Prinses Margriet Canal that was under construction were the works near Grouw. The suspicions of the Groningen deputy Ebels were based on that the Stroobos–Fonejacht section would be needed for both canals. Past the junction at Fonejacht, much had been done for the Van Harinxma Canal and little on the Prinses Margriet Canal. The Friesland government reiterated that both canals would be finished at the same time.

In December 1939, the national government proposed a solution for the conflict with Groningen. Lemmer would remain the end point. A dam in the IJsselmeer would make Lemmer more suitable in Winter. The financial contributions of the provinces would be limited and the national government and Friesland would compensate Groningen for some interest losses.

During World War II construction continued at a slow pace due to lack of resources. In the first half of 1940, the bridges at Stroobos, Blauwverlaat, and Kootstertille were finished. The bridges at Schuilenburg, Fonejacht, Bergumerdam, and Uitwelleringa were under construction. In November 1941, Fonejacht Bridge was taken into use. In 1944 all work on the canal was suspended.

In early 1946, the canal was mostly ready between Stroobos and Grouw. From Grouw to Oude Schouw the canal was under construction. From there to Lemmer some parts had been done, but most of the bridges and the locks still had to be started. The ambition was now to finish the canal in 1950. Incredibly, Rijkswaterstaat then proposed to halt construction in late 1948, because of the financial crisis. Friesland and Groningen then saved the plan by forwarding their contrtibutions. This made that 1950 still seamed feasible.

In the end, the Prinses Margriet Canal was finished in 1951. Terherne Lock was opened on 1 February 1951. In March 1951 the first barge passed the Prinses Margriet Lock in Lemmer. On 30 May 1951, the Prinses Margriet Canal and the Van Harinxma Canal were both officially opened. During the festivities, the lock at Lemmer got the name Prinses Margriet Lock.

In 1955, the canal(s) from Stroobos to Lemmer were christened Prinses Margriet Canal. This had practical reasons, because for shipping one wanted to avoid confusion with the older waterways of smaller dimensions. The names of upgraded constituent parts could remain in use locally.

== Usage and upgrades ==
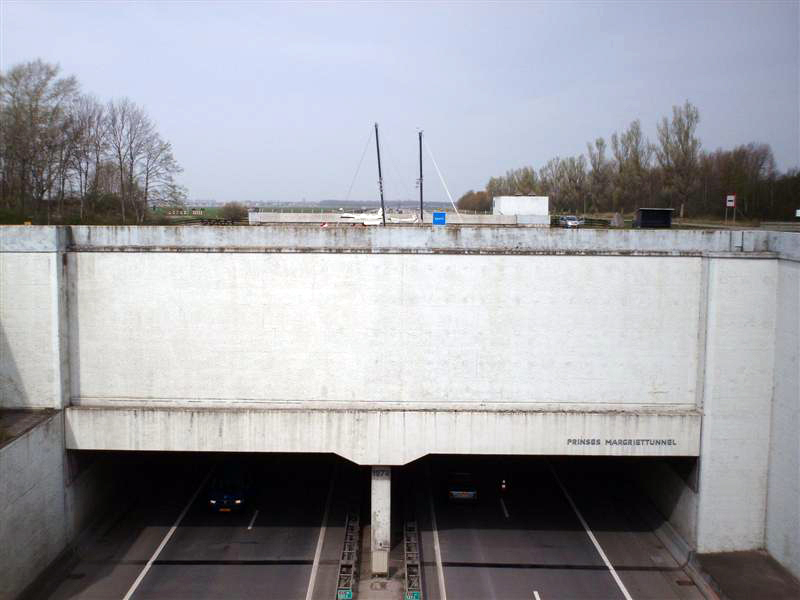
Prinses Margriet Tunnel near Sneek, opened in 1977

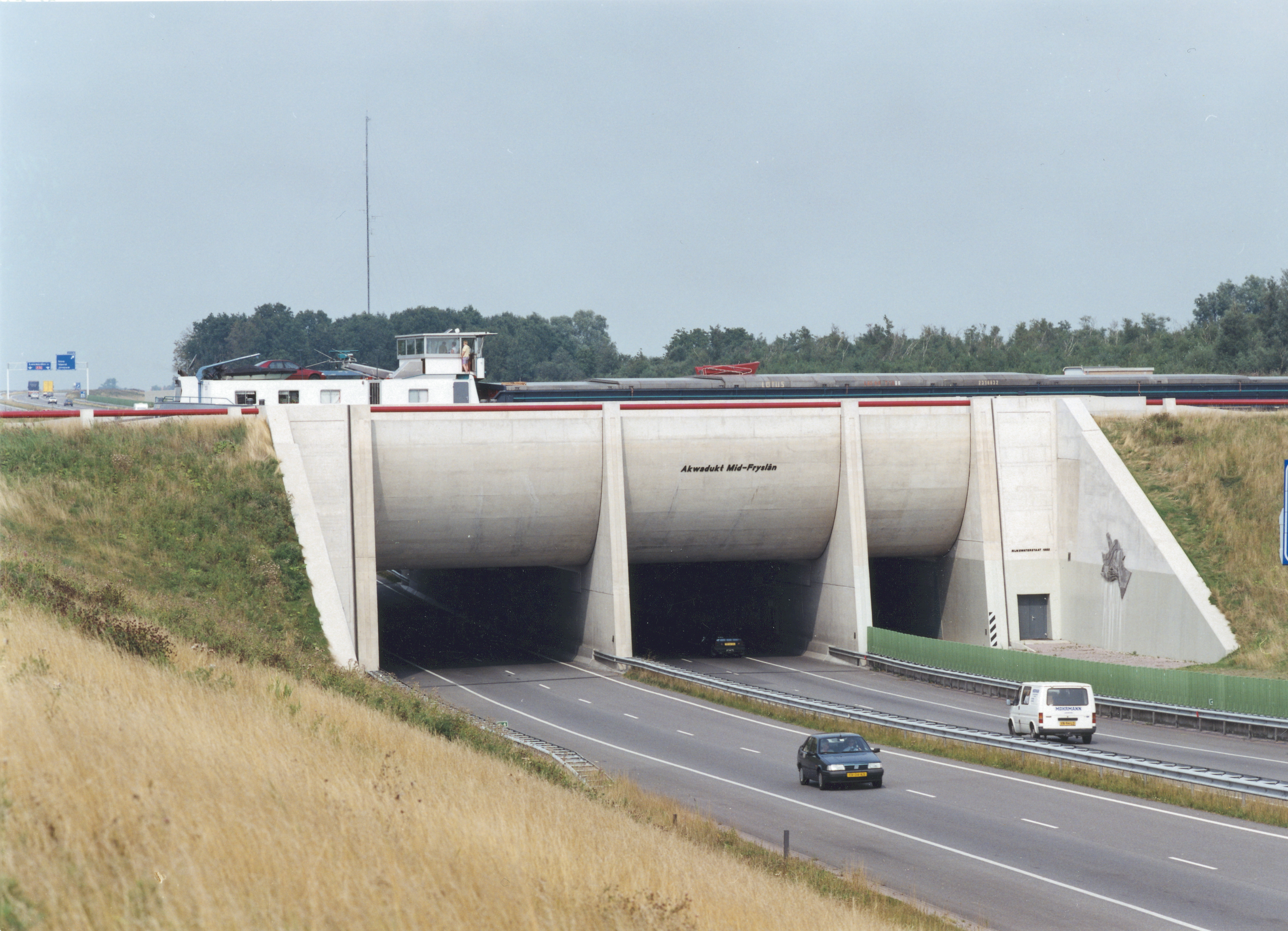
Barge and cars at Aqueduct Mid-Fryslan

The Prinses Margriet Canal was an immediate success. While shipping on the route had totalled about 1,1 million t in 1938, it was over 11 million t in 1962. This was a tenfold increase. In the 1950s, the canal got side canals to Drachten, Heerenveen, and other places. The canal now proved important for the industrialization of Friesland.

As built, the canal was 3 m deep with a bottom width of 20 m. It was suitable for barges of 1,350t and coastal vessels of 250GRT. The massive increase of traffic put a lot of strain on the canal. Starting in 1963 it was made 3.5 m deep with a bottom width of 24 m. Kootstertille Bridge and Blauwverlaat Bridge would be changed to make their movable part 12 m wide instead of only 9 m. However, Blauwverlaat was postponed so long that when it was finally opened in 1985, it got a width of 16 m.

The next upgrade had to make the canal suitable for CEMT class V barges. This also showed how much the Prinses Margriet Canal was part of the Lemmer–Delfzijl Waterway. To make the upgrade useful, two things had to be done urgently: an upgrade of the Oranje Locks in Amsterdam, and an upgrade of the Oostersluis that connects the Van Starkenborgh Canal to the Eems Canal. In 1991, the Dutch House of Representatives approved a plan to upgrade the Lemmer–Delfzijl Waterway and therefore also the Prinses Margriet Canal to CEMT class V.

The scope of the works to make the waterway suitable for CEMT class V probably changed over time. At first, it was said that most work for this would be finished in 2011. On 1 January 2014, Rijkswaterstaat took over the management of all the canals of the Lemmer–Delfzijl Waterway. By 2025, the main things that were still to be done were the replacement of Spannenburg Bridge, Oude Schouw Bridge, Uitwelleringa Bridge, and Kootstertille Bridge.
