= Van der Meulen =

Van der Meulen or Vandermeulen is a Dutch toponymic or occupational surname, meaning "from the (wind/water) mill" (modern Dutch molen). The even more common surname Vermeulen is a contraction of this name. Less common variants are "Van der Molen", "Vandermolen", "Ter Meulen", "Termeulen", "Van Meulen" and just "Meulen".

== People ==
- Adam Frans van der Meulen (1632–1690), Flemish Baroque painter
- Agnes van der Meulen (born 1947), Dutch badminton player
- Albert Jan van der Meulen (1940-2025), Dutch paleontologist
- Alice ter Meulen (born 1952), Dutch linguist
- Augie Vander Meulen (1909–1993), American basketball player
- Claes Pietersz van der Meulen (1642–1693), Dutch glass painter
- Cornelis van der Meulen (1642–1691), Dutch painter
- Daniel van der Meulen (1894–1989), Dutch diplomat, explorer and writer
- Daniel Vandermeulen, Canadian educator
- Gary Vandermeulen (born 1965), Canadian swimmer
- Gejus van der Meulen (1903–1972), Dutch football goalkeeper
- Hannie Termeulen (1929–2001), Dutch freestyle swimmer
- Harm van der Meulen (1925–2007), Dutch trade unionist and politician
- Helena van der Meulen, Dutch screenwriter, film critic and TV writer
- Johan van der Meulen (1915–2005), better known as John O'Mill, Dutch writer
- Kaat Van der Meulen (born 1995), Belgian racing cyclist
- Karst van der Meulen (born 1949), Dutch film and television director
- Laurens van der Meulen (1643–1719), Flemish sculptor and frame maker
- Leendert van der Meulen (1937–2015), Dutch track cyclist
- Marjolein van der Meulen (born 1960s), American biomedical engineer
- Matthijs van der Meulen (1888–1967), Dutch composer and music journalist (in 1915 changed his name to "Matthijs Vermeulen")
- Olof van der Meulen (born 1968), Dutch volleyball player
- Reinder van der Meulen, Dutch linguist, expert in the Balto-Slavic and Dutch languages.
- Servaes van der Meulen (1525–1592), Flemish composer and organist
- Sieuwert van der Meulen (1663–1730), Dutch painter
- Stephen Vandermeulen (born 1965), Canadian swimmer
- Steven van der Meulen (died 1563), Flemish-born English portrait painter
- Thijs van der Meulen (born 1980), Dutch football defender
- Timothy van der Meulen (born 1990), Dutch football defender
- Tsjibbe Gearts van der Meulen (1824–1906), Frisian writer and poet
- Yana van der Meulen Rodgers (born 1966), Dutch-born American feminist economist

== Families ==
- Van der Meulen family, an old and important family of fish merchants in Brussels.

== See also ==
- Van der Molen
- Vermeulen
