= Former Protestant church of Eastermar =

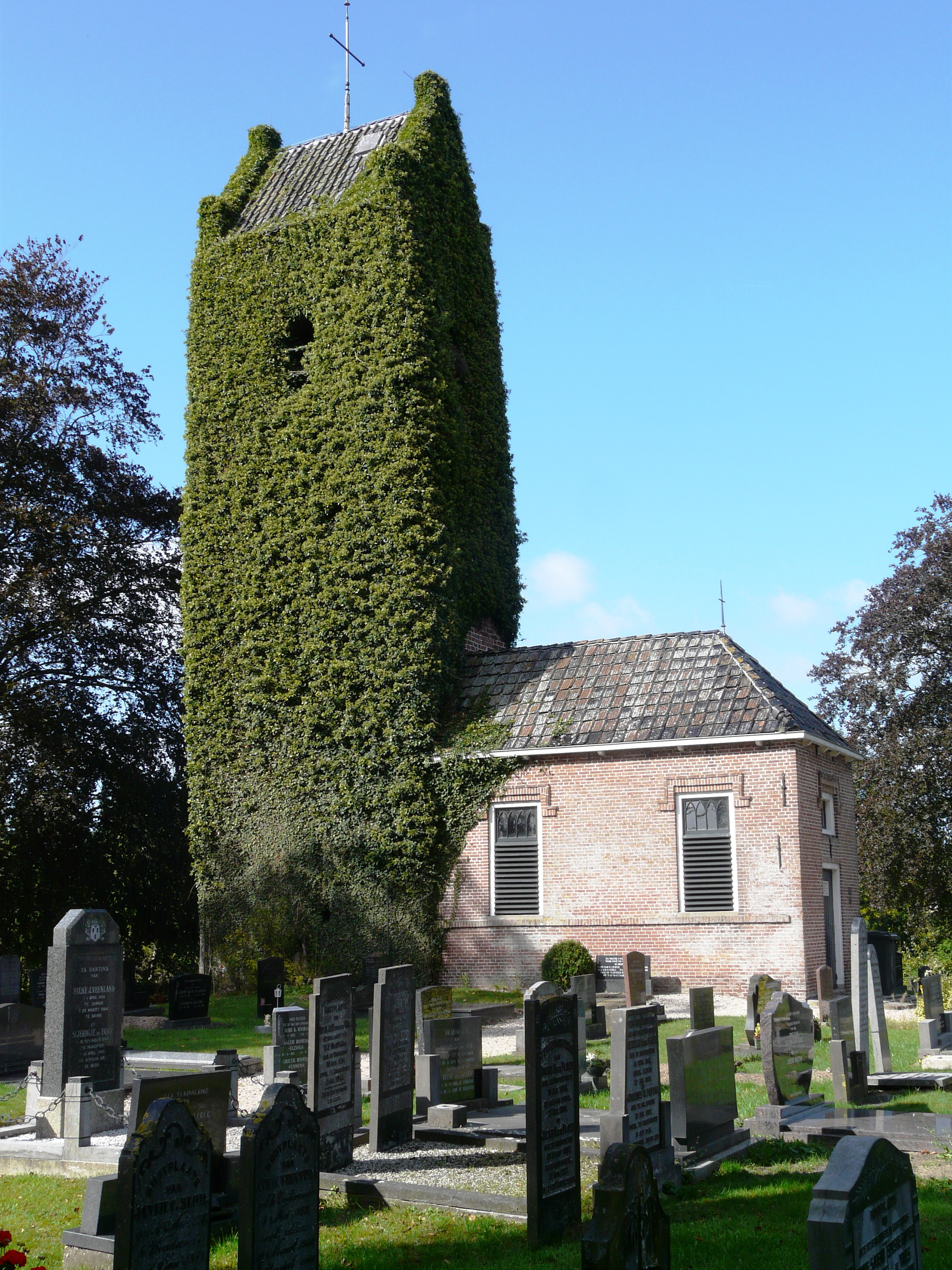
- Church of Eastermar
- Former Protestant church of Eastermar
- 53.1853°N 6.0703°E

Specifications
- Materials: Brick

The former Protestant church of Eastermar was a church that stood in It Heechsân, Eastermar, Netherlands. It was demolished in 1868. Today only the medieval tower from the 13th century remains. The church is located far out of the center of the village on the Torenlaan 11 and is surrounded by a graveyard. Next to the tower stands a grave diggers building.

The mechanical clockwork in the tower was made by the Gebr. van Bergen from Midwolda, Groningen in 1924. It is listed as a Rijksmonument, number 35666 and is rated with a very high historical value.

== Gallery ==
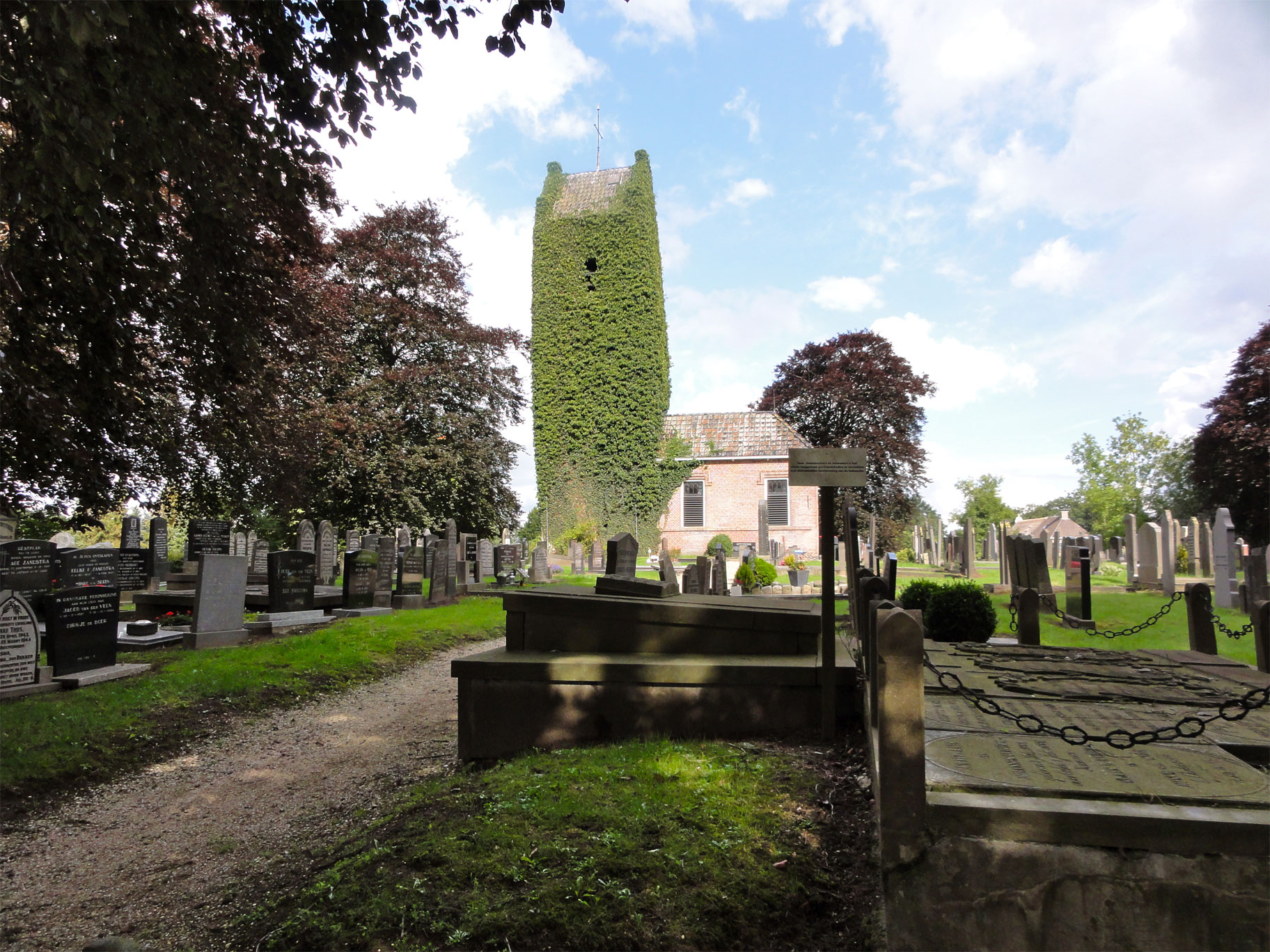
Church and graveyard

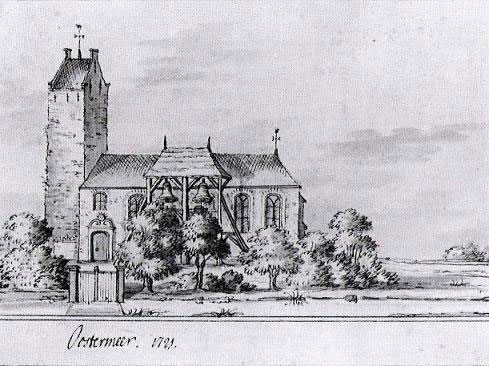
Drawing of the church by Jacobus Stellingwerff from 1721
