= Meulen =

Meulen is a Dutch toponymic surname meaning "mill" (modern Dutch molen). Notable people with the surname include:

- Ever Meulen (born 1946), pseudonym of Eddy Vermeulen, Belgian illustrator
- Henry Meulen (1882–1978), British anarchist and economist
- Manoe Meulen (born 1978), Dutch women's footballer

== See also ==
- Van der Meulen
- Vermeulen
