= Koriander =

Koriander may refer to:

- Starfire (Koriand'r), DC Comics character
- The German and Dutch name of coriander (Coriandrum sativum)
- Koriander (restaurant), a fine dining restaurant in Drachten, Netherlands
- Koriander Indian Cuisine, an Indian restaurant in Belmont, California
