= Halles de Schaerbeek =

Cultural centre in Brussels, Belgium

- Halles de Schaerbeek (French); Hallen van Schaarbeek (Dutch)
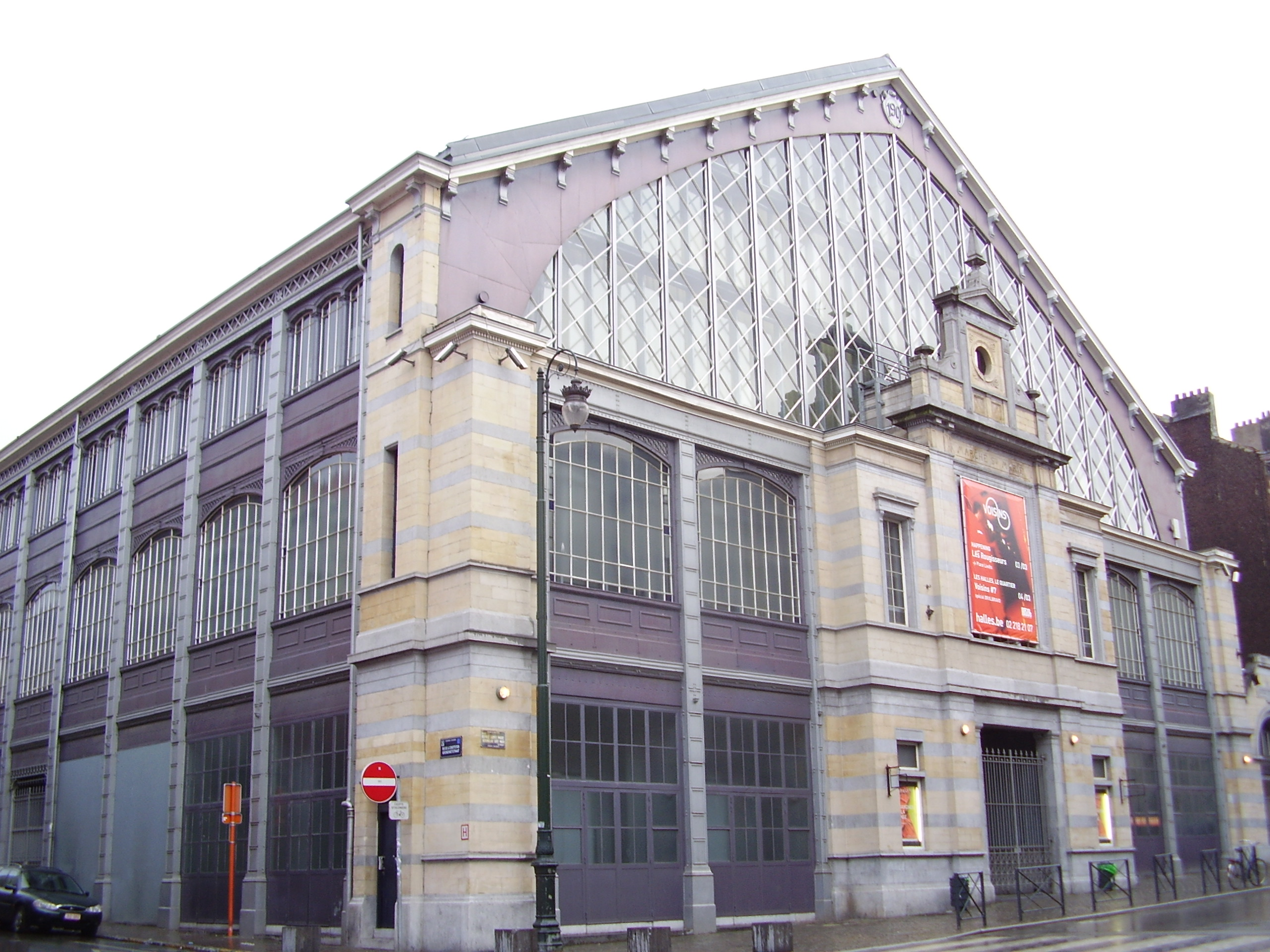
- Exterior of the Halles de Schaerbeek
- Interactive map of Halles de Schaerbeek
- Address: Rue Royale Sainte-Marie / Koninklijke Sinte-Mariastraat 22; 1030 Schaerbeek, Brussels-Capital Region; Belgium
- Coordinates: 50°51′37″N 4°22′11″E
- Type: Cultural centre

Website
- www.halles.be/en

The Halles de Schaerbeek (French) or Hallen van Schaarbeek (Dutch) is a cultural centre in Brussels, Belgium. It is located at 22, rue Royale Sainte-Marie/Koninklijke Sinte-Mariastraat in Schaerbeek, in the former St. Mary covered market, built in 1865 and destroyed by a fire in 1898.

== History ==
=== Market hall ===
The building was constructed in 1865, under the leadership of the architect Gustave Hansotte, to serve as a covered market (St. Mary covered market) for farmers coming from the surrounding countryside to sell their poultry and vegetables. This covered market was destroyed by fire in 1898 and there is currently little left of the 1865 building except the central facade with the location of a missing clock.

The municipal authorities called a firm specialised in metallic structures for the reconstruction. The new covered market of more than 3,000 m^{2} (32,000 sq ft) was inaugurated in October 1901. It is the work of the architect Henry Van Massenhove, constructed in 1901 with the help of the constructor Bertaux, specialist in metallic structures.

=== Abandonment, renovation and reassignment ===
The market hall remained active until around 1920, but the gradual appearance of supermarkets and numerous department stores caused its decline. For fifty years, the building stayed abandoned, sometimes serving as a parking lot, as a storage place or even as an adventure playground for the district's children.

Abandoned from 1920 to the early 1970s, the place was bought in 1973 by the French Community Commission (French: Commission communautaire française or COCOF), which sold it to the French Community in 1983. The renovation work, which started in 1984, ended in 1997, and Les Halles became a cultural centre. It is one of the first industrial sites in Brussels to be reallocated as a cultural complex, and the first covered market. The Halles de Schaerbeek is one of the rare buildings with a metallic structure still existing in Brussels.

As an example of reallocation of an industrial place into a cultural complex, the Halles include three performance halls: the Grande Halle (capacity: up to 2,000 standing spectators), the Petite Halle (multipurpose room) and the Cave (foyer, bar and multi-purpose space). They lend themselves well for circus shows, but their modular infrastructure allows all activities. They are very open to the neighbourhood, which is home to a multicultural and often disadvantaged population.

Under the impetus of Philippe Grombeer, their first director, the Halles have, since 1991, a vocation of European Cultural Center. Since December 2012, management has been provided by Christophe Galent (former secretary general of Le Volcan national scene in Le Havre, France).

== See also ==
- History of Brussels
- Culture of Belgium
- Belgium in the long nineteenth century
