= It Heechsân =

It Heechsân Hoogzand
- Hamlet
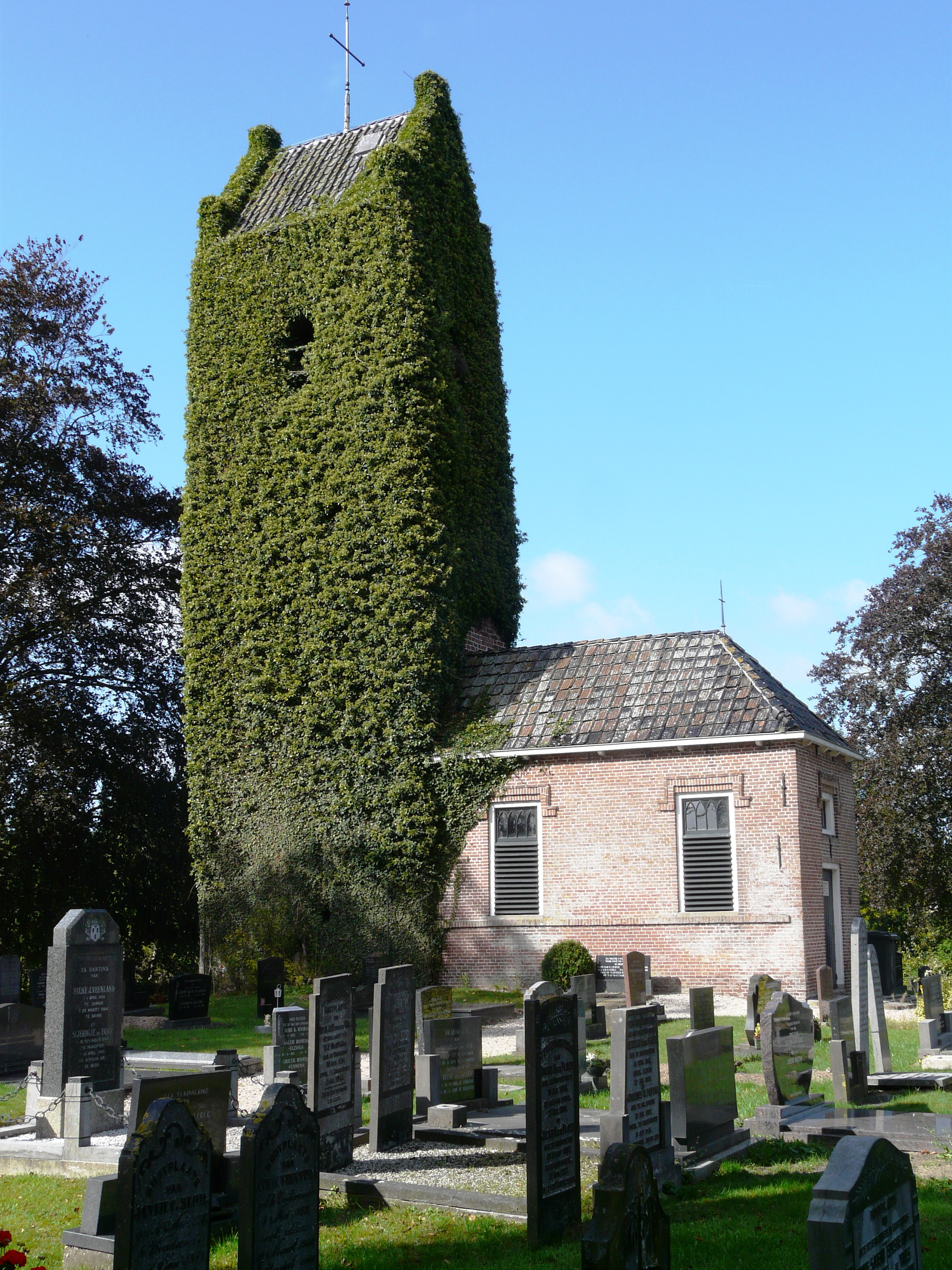
- Church Tower at It Heechsân

- Location in the Netherlands It Heechsân (Netherlands)
- Coordinates: 53.1851°N 6.0716°E
- Country: Netherlands
- Province: Friesland
- Municipality: Tytsjerksteradiel
- Time zone: UTC+1 (CET)
  - Summer (DST): UTC+2 (CEST)
- Postal code: 9061
- Dialing code: 058

It Heechsân (Dutch: Hoogzand) is a hamlet in Tytsjerksteradiel in the province of Friesland, the Netherlands.

It Heechsân is not a statistical entity, and the postal authorities have placed it under Eastermar. It Heechsân has place name signs. It was originally called Oostermeer, but from 1847 onwards it was listed as Hoogzand. The hamlet consists of about 100 houses.

The Protestant Church of Eastermar is not located in Eastermar, but in It Heechsân. The old church was torn down in 1868; however, the 13th-century tower has remained. The tower is totally covered in ivy (Hedera helix). A little building for coffins has been built next to the tower. In 1868, a new church was built which is also located in It Heechsân.
