= Koert Vermeulen =

Belgian lighting designer (born 1967)

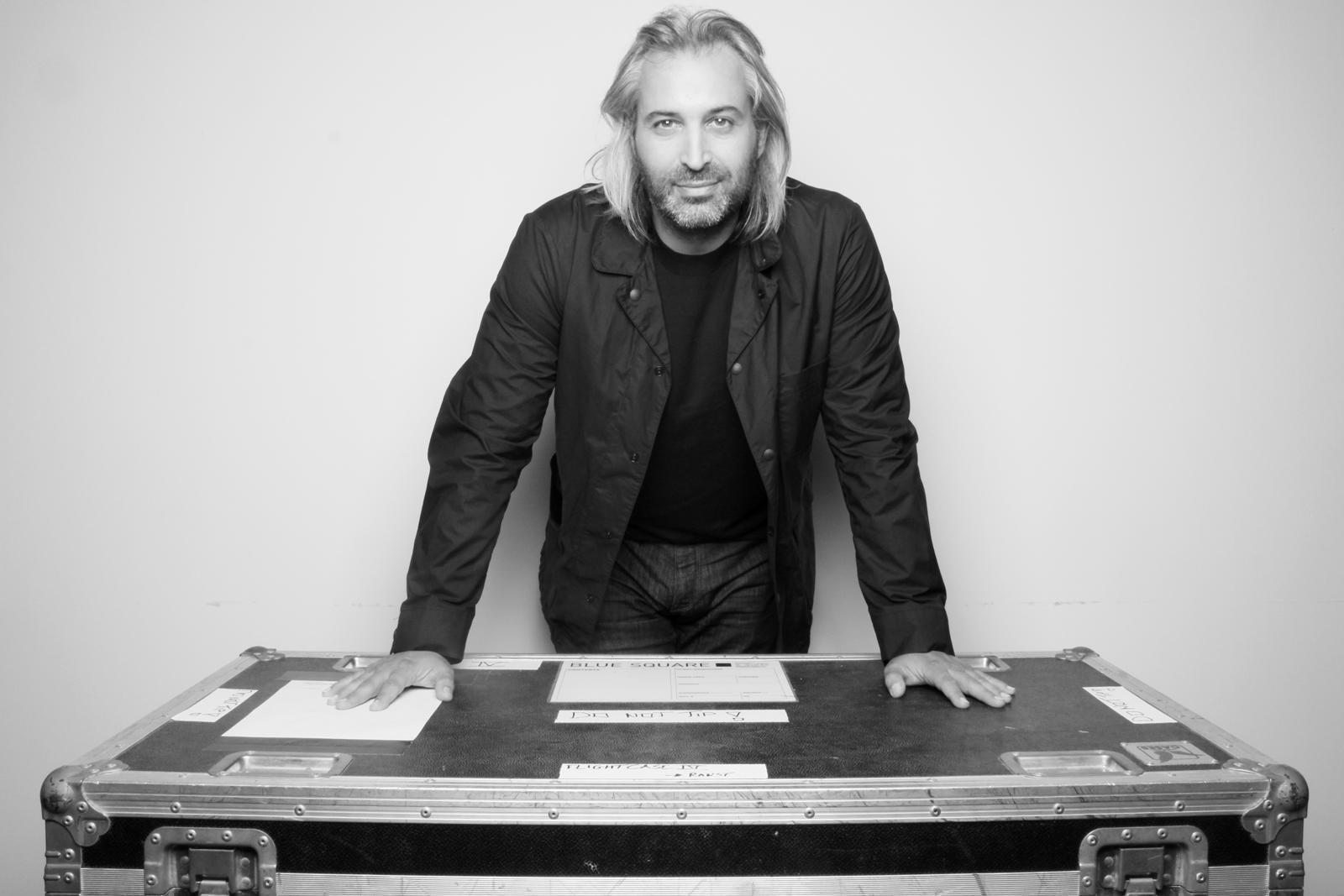
- Born: December 1967 (age 58–59); Antwerp, Belgium
- Occupation: Lighting and Experience Designer
- Website: www.actld.com

Koert Vermeulen (born 1967 in Antwerp, Belgium), principal designer, founder and managing partner of ACTLD, is a Belgium-based lighting and visual designer who creates lighting, art, set, video and content designs for public events worldwide. Since 1995, his work has broadened from entertainment and architectural lighting design to large scale live events, ceremonies, international expos and cultural festivals.

== Start of career ==
Koert started his career in 1989, when he founded his first professional lighting & sound supply company. He started to conceive the lighting for nightclubs, concerts and fashion shows of Antwerp, he also discovered the world of corporate events.

== Entertainment lighting design ==
After founding ACT Lighting Design in 1995, Koert started to expand his work to stage plays, urban operas, “sound & light” shows, fashion shows, such as “Décrocher la Lune”, in cooperation with artistic director Luc Petit. In 1999, Koert met Franco Dragone, and illuminates several projects for him, such as the prestigious Le Rêve, a show launched in April 2005 at the Wynn Las Vegas Hotel & Casino.

Koert also illuminates the corporate shows of Hermès, Coca-Cola, the National Bank of Belgium, Microsoft, Sun Microsystems, Ernst&Young, Siemens, Samsonite, Saatchi and Mercedes, and collaborates with artistic director Dirk Decloedt, and event agencies such as Any Performance, KCom, D-Side, DDMC and Guava. In 2011, Koert conceived the lighting design of Metinvest corporate show in Ukraine, which was directed by Luc Petit CREATION and produced by K-Events agency.

For 15 years, he has also ensured the visual design of I Love Techno in Ghent, the biggest indoor techno festival in Belgium, with 35.000 people attending each year.

Among many concert and live events lighting designers, Koert was chosen to conceive the light show of the concert in honour of the government of Albert II – King of Belgium, as well as to assure lighting and video projection of the opening ceremony of the Belgian presidency of the European Union in 2010] On these two projects, he collaborated with Frank Anthierens. “Je m’voyais déjà”, a musical based on songs of Charles Aznavour, which lighting video and content were also designed by Koert. The musical stayed eight months in Paris, before touring in France, Belgium, Switzerland and Canada in 2009.

Never ceasing to work for live theatre and spectacles, he also illuminates small contemporary forms such as “L’homme assis dans le couloir”, a play from Marguerite Duras, directed by Razerka Ben Sadia-Lavant at the Théâtre National de Chaillot in Paris. For over five years, he has collaborated with in-SENS, a dance company specialised in vertical and contemporary dance.

Koert began to collaborate with Marcos Vinals Bassols, who became artistic director and set designer for ACT lighting design, in 2010. Together, they designed the entire set, lighting, content and video animation of several projects such as, 2010 and 2011 editions of 'HALA' Layali Febrayer Music and Poetry festival in Kuwait, the concert “One phone One pass” in Brussels and “Cine Callao” in Madrid etc.

== Architectural lighting design ==
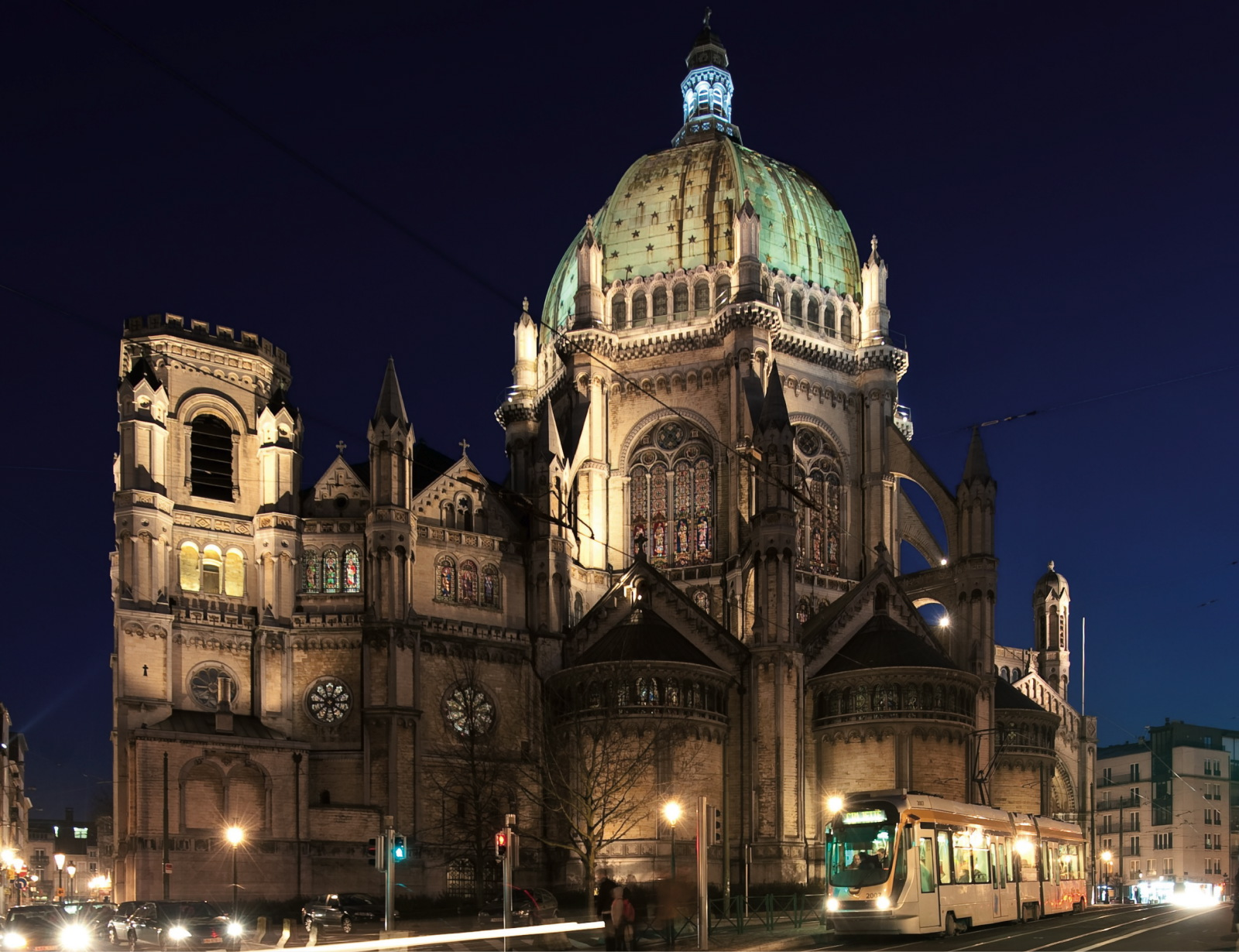
St.Mary's Church in Brussels

Since 1998, he has expanded his work towards architecture, with projects such as exhibitions, museums, heritage sites, shopping malls, urban spaces, city master plans, office centers and other outdoor projects, while keeping his specific stage approach. His collaboration with Bruno Demeester on these projects, led in 2004, to the creation of ACT architectural lighting design. Since then, the ACT lighting design agency, with its nine lighting designers based in Brussels and Paris, provides its expertise on international projects such as the church of St. Mary's in Brussels, the commercial centers De Klanderij, Optimum and Sanko Park, the master plan for La Defense, Paris’ financial district, projects for Center Parcs.

Exhibitions and museums projects include: “Le droit de rêver” (The right to dream), on the occasion of the 25th commemoration of Jacques Brel's death, directed by Stan Colders, and “Magazine” for the National library in Hague. With SIEN, a museum design agency, Koert collaborates on several exhibition projects, like “Suikermuseum” in Tienen and “Locutorium”, in Leuven. He designed the architectural, scenographic and exterior lighting schemes for the prestigious Ghent City Museum, and the lighting and video of themed attractions for Walt Disney Studio, Parc Asterix, Futuroscope and Park Tivoli.

== Light art installations ==
After winning the European competition of Lighting Festival “Fêtes des Lumières” in Lyon in 2006, Koert developed a new expression of contemporary Light Art installations. He designed the “sound and light” spectacles for the 2007 and 2009 Winter Festivities in Brussels. In 2008, he is the invited artist for “SolStis”, the first edition of Brussels own light festival, and also for “Arbres et Lumières” in Geneva and Luxembourg.

=== “Tree rings” - Christmas Illumination of Champs-Elysees in Paris (2011-2014) ===
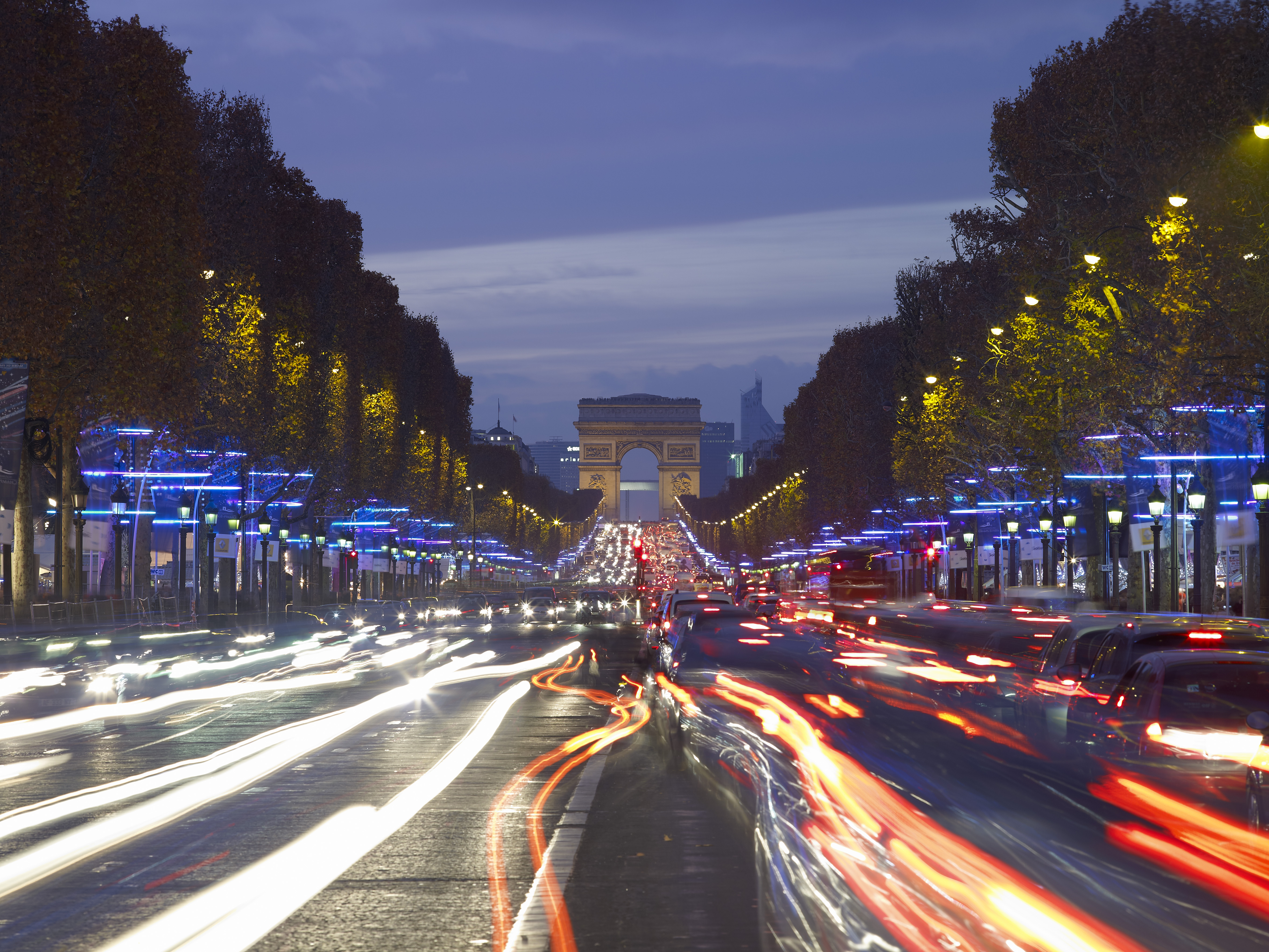
Christmas Illumination Champs-Elysées, Paris (2011)

In 2009, the “Comité Champs-Elysées” launched an international competition for the new design of the Christmas illuminations. Out of over 27 entries, ACT Lighting Design was declared award winner in June 2010, with its light art installation “Tree Rings”(2011–2014). The project was headed up by principal designer Koert Vermeulen and artistic director Marcos Viñals Bassols. They approached the Avenue as a stage play, combining innovation with a strong visual identity. The main idea was to obtain a “new aesthetic that was not related to the traditional image of Christmas," and to create a distinctive and long lasting experience for the public. The project aimed at breaking with the past, not only through an original design, but also with a specific technical approach that allowed a durable and sustainable solution.

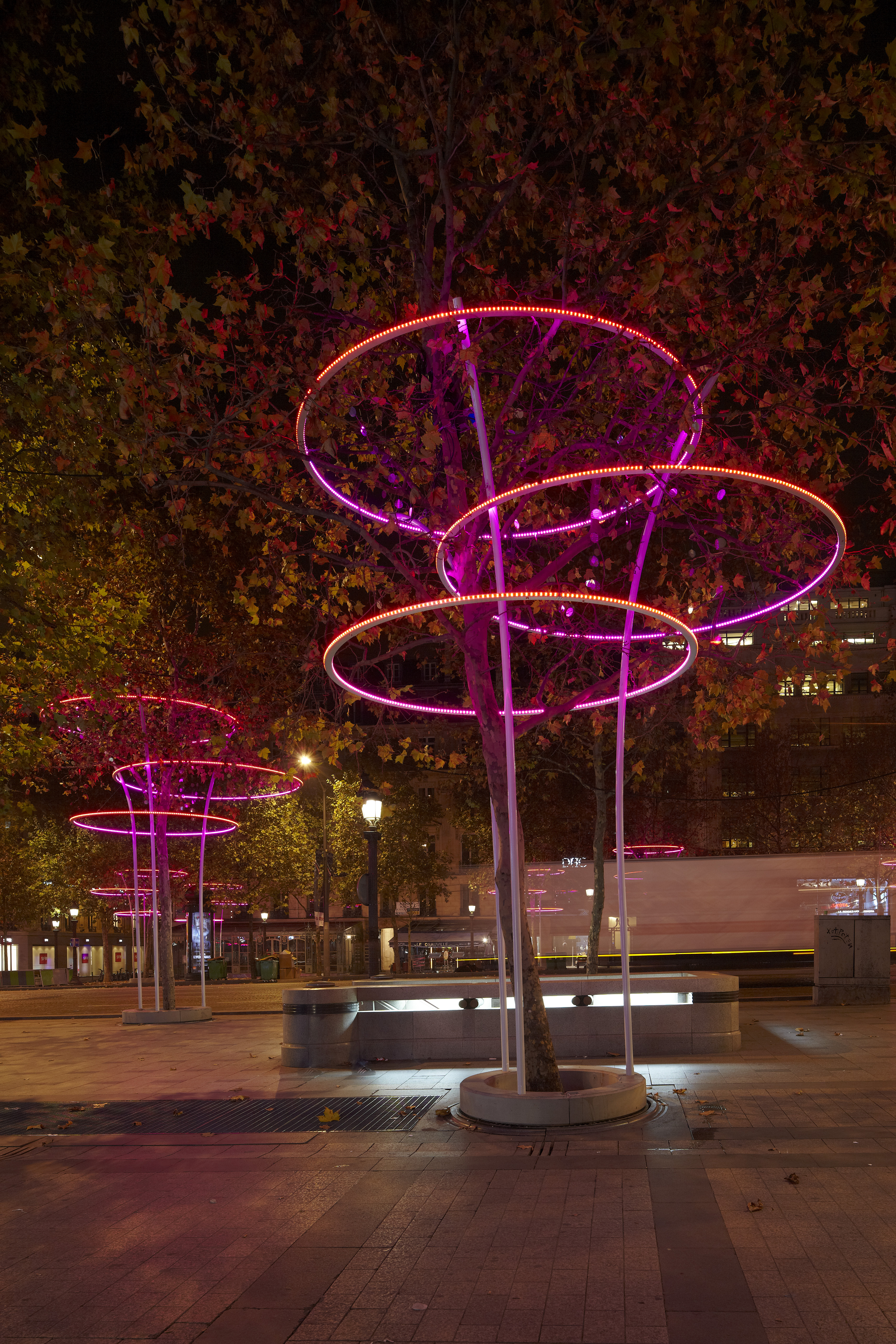
Christmas Illuminations of the Champs –Elysées, 2011

=== Creative vision of “Tree Rings” ===
The Tree Rings was installed on 200 trees of the Avenue of the Champs-Elysées (2.4 kilometers) in Paris. Each tree is encircle by three rings of different diameters (between 3,12m et 3,84 m) made of 6 programmable LED RGB (Red Green Blue) strips, which are placed all around the tree to illuminate it at 360° (in total 1.2 million LED lights) without touching it. The lighting schemes add drama, movement and color. The rings are supported at three points by three curved metal rods, the longest section measuring 6 meters. A concrete base supports the three metal rods.

== Lighting design for opening and closing ceremonies of Youth Olympic Games in Singapore (2010) ==
In May 2009, Koert Vermeulen with ACT Lighting Design won the opportunity to light the Singapore Youth Olympic Games Opening Ceremony.

== Lectures and speeches ==
A guest professor from 2004 to 2008 at the Royal Academy of Fine Arts in Antwerp, teaching a course on “Lighting Design”, Koert is also a member of The Professional Lighting Designers' Association (PLDA), the International Association of Lighting Designers (IALD) and the Themed Entertainment Association (TEA). He is a speaker at the 2011 Professional Lighting Design Convention (PLDC) in Madrid.

Year	Lectures and Speeches
2019	Keynote Speaker at Ljusdagen, (Stockholm, Sweden)
2018	Speaker at Themed Entertainment Association's SATE Europe 2018 (Story + Architecture + Technology = Experience) Topic: "The Yin and Yang of Technology"
2018	Keynote Speaker at "Genius Loci 2018" in Weimar, Germany. Topic: "Innovations in Digital Placemaking"
2018	Speaker at "Lendlease Cities Conference" in London, UK. Topic: "Immersive Experiences in Public Space"
2018	Keynote Speaker at "AINB - 4 x LIGHT" in Ghent, Belgium. Topic: "A New Methodology for Lighting & Visual Design"
2018	Keynote Speaker at "ZHONGTAI 2018" in Chengdu, China. Topic: "The Anti-Disciplinary Design Agency"
2017	Speaker at The Professional Lighting Design Convention (PLDC) in Paris, France. Topic: "Understanding Design Thinking for Lighting Design; You Will Never Work the Same Way Again"
2017	Speaker at "Baltic Fort Events Forum" in Tallinn, Estonia. Topic: "Creativity meets innovation - New challenges of Visual Design"
2017	Speaker at the symposium organized by Academy of Performing Art in Brno, Czech Republic. Topic: "Stage Lighting"
2017	"The Challenge" - Young Designers' speaker competition organized by PLDC. Role: Coaching of a young talent 2016–2017.
2017	Speaker at "Light Passion Night" organized by Clay Paky in Paris, France. Topic: "Advanced lighting design in architecture & events"
2016	Speaker at the "European Drone Convention" organized by EUKA in Genk, Belgium. Topic: "Perspectives of Multi-Drone Operations"
2016	Keynote Speaker at the "VPT Academy" during "CUE 2016" Trade Fair in Rotterdam, NL. Topic: "Creativity Meets Innovation - New Challenges of Visual Design"
2015	Speaker at the Alighting Design Forum organized by Chinese Lighting Designers' Association (CLAD) in Shanghai, China. Topic: "The Fusion of Architectural Lighting and Show Elements"
2015	Speaker at the Drone Apps Forum in Lausanne, Switzerland. Topic: "Use of drones in Media & Entertainment"
2015	Speaker at the "PRG Alliance Summit" organized by PRG during Prolight + Sound Frankfurt Trade Show. Topic: "Architainment - A Game Changer"
2014	Speaker at Professional Lighting Design Convention (PLDC) in Istanbul, Turkey
2014	Speaker at Acuity Brands' Training Sessions in Las Vegas, NV. Topic: "Inspiring the Future of Lighting Design"
2013	Speaker at 4th Professional Lighting Design Convention (PLDC) in Copenhagen, Denmark. Topic: "The Lighting Design Profession: A Sustainable Future?"
2013	Speaker at symposium organized by "Institut Lichtontwerpen" (iLo) in Amsterdam, NL. Topic: "Light (art) in the Urban Spaces"
2012	Philips LIGHTS ON 2012 - by Philips Brazil
2012	Keynote Speaker at "PLD-i Seminars 2012 in Alingsås" in Alingsås, Sweden. Topic: "Immersive Environments - Engaging the Public Through Light and Design"
2012	Speaker at TEA's SATE 2012 co-chaired with Yves Pépin and Joe Rohde in Disneyland Paris, France. Topic: "Cultural Diversity in Creating Successful Guest Experiences: An Obstacle or an Opportunity?"
2012	Keynote Speaker at "PLD interactive seminars" at Light + Building Frankfurt, Germany. Topic: "New Technologies in the Public Realm - Immersive Environments"
2012	Speaker and Lighting Panelist at "Dynamic Events" International Conference for the Event Production Industry in Amsterdam, NL. Topic: "Singapore Youth Olympic Opening Ceremony" (SYOG).
2012	Key Speaker at UNIZO (Flemish Association of Business Owners) in Brussels, Belgium
2011	Keynote speaker at the PLDC conference in Madrid.
2010	Guest speaker at the LUCI (Lighting Urban Community International) Conference in Ghent dealt with festive lighting for the cities.
2010	Keynote speaker at Nordic lighting conference (NordLED) organized by The Danish Lighting Center (IES) in Copenhagen, with topic on "Leds in real projects...why?"
2010	Guest speaker at “Les Rencontres de la Lumière” conference, organized by City of Lyon Light Festival Department and LUCI ( Lighting Urban Community International), in Lyon, with a topic on “the SYOG’s -water and light”
2009	Guest speaker at Retail Design Conference in Istanbul.
2009, 2007	Guest lecturer for LIDAC Congress in explaining the independent lighting designer's perspective.
2009	Guest lecturer and consultant for End-user event in Fashion, Eindhoven and Antwerp.
2009	Guest lecturer and event consultant for Creative Specifier Workshop, Eindhoven, with the topic on Light and Fragrance, with the collaboration of Dimitri Weber.
2009	Guest lecturer for an internal training called “Working with Creative Specifiers” Eindhoven.
2008	Guest speaker at The PLDA Light Focus Middle East Conference in Dubai/UAE, with a topic on Lighting design for water-based structures.
2008	Lighting designer & production designer for “Illuminesca” fashion show in Amsterdam.
2004–2008	Professor of lighting design course at “Hogeschool Antwerpen, department Design Sciences”.
2006	Workshop head for ELDA+ lighting design workshops in Birmingham.
2003	Guest speaker at LDI Las Vegas.
2004	Guest speaker at LDI Orlando.
2002	Guest speaker at Plasa London.
1997	Guest speaker at Showlight (international congress for lighting professionals every 4 years) with topic on “Son et Lumiere”.

== See also ==
- List of lighting designers
- Stage lighting
- PLASA
- Architectural lighting design
- Landscape lighting
