= Koriander (restaurant) =

Coordinates: 53°6′12.21″N 6°5′53.83″E

- Interactive map of Koriander

Restaurant information
- Established: 1993
- Head chef: Jan Gaastra
- Food type: French
- Rating: Michelin Guide
- Location: Burgemeester Wuiteweg 18, Drachten, 9203 KK, Netherlands
- Seating capacity: 65
- Website: Official website

Restaurant Koriander is a restaurant in Drachten, in the Netherlands. It is a fine dining restaurant that is awarded one Michelin star from 1999 till 2018.

Gault Millau awarded the restaurant 13 points out of 20 In 1997 and 1998, Michelin awarded the restaurant a Bib Gourmand, signalling good food for a reasonable price.

Head chef of Koriander is Jan Gaastra.

Restaurant Koriander was originally in Bergum. In January 2000, the restaurant moved to Drachten.

In 1996, chef Gaastra called in the fire department because of a strong gas smell. After a careful examination, it appeared to be no gas leak, but a stock of fresh truffles.

== See also ==
- List of Michelin starred restaurants in the Netherlands
