= Eastermar =

Eastermar Oostermeer
- Village
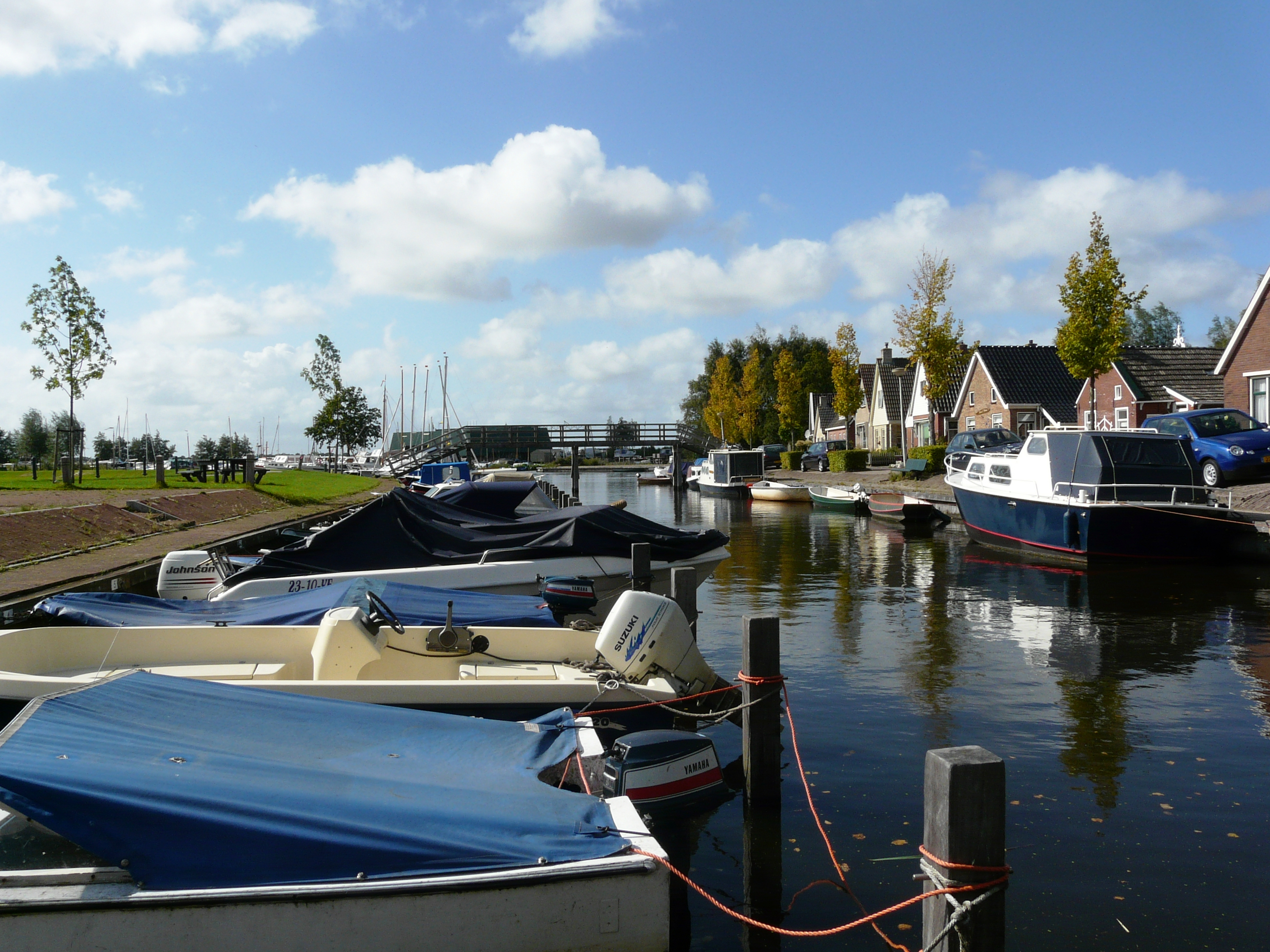
- Eastermar marina

- Coat of arms

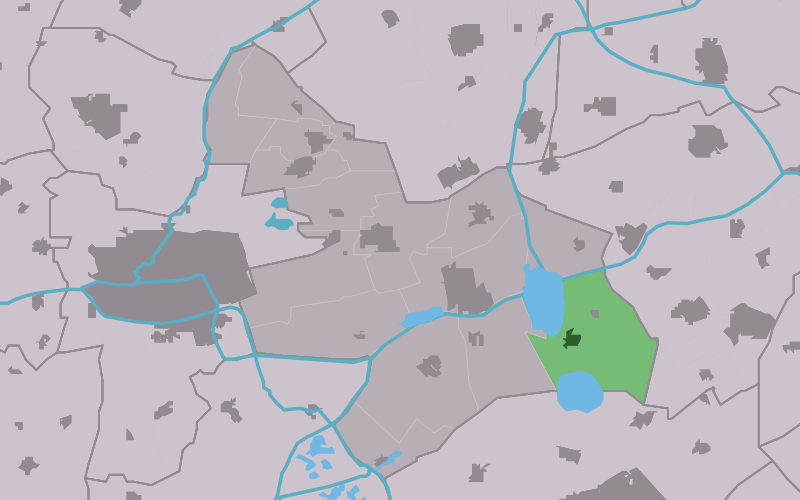
- Location of the village in Tytsjerksteradiel

- Location in the Netherlands Eastermar (Netherlands)
- Country: Netherlands
- Province: Friesland
- Municipality: Tytsjerksteradiel

Population (1 January 2017)
  - Total: 1,575
- Time zone: UTC+1 (CET)
  - Summer (DST): UTC+2 (CEST)
- Postal code: 9261
- Dialing code: 0512

Eastermar (Dutch: Oostermeer) is a village in Tytsjerksteradiel municipality in the province Friesland (Fryslân in West Frisian) of the Netherlands. It had around 1,575 citizens in January 2017.

== History ==
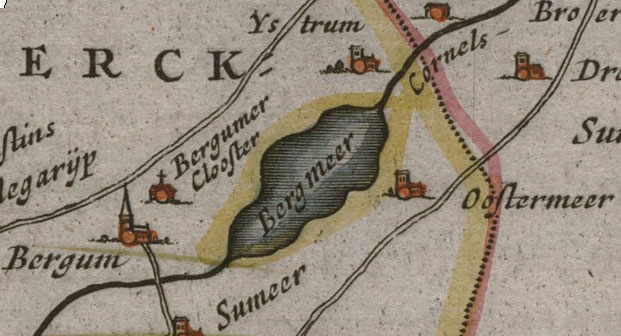
Eastermar on a map from the Atlas Novus, ± 1630, using the historical Dutch name of Oostermeer (with a long s). The Burgumer Mar is shown as Bergmeer

As early as 4000 BC there were nomads in this area. An important archaeological discovery was made at Burgumer Mar, a lake to the northwest of Eastermar. This discovery is known as the Leien-Warten Kompleks. Also found around Eastermar were mammoth teeth and gold rings, now in the Regional Museum in Burgum.

The first farmers settled on the higher grounds east of the Burgumer Mar. Around 1200, the first stone church was built here, which was later known as the Protestant church of Eastermar. The community is believed to be several centuries older than the church. As shown on a 1605 map, originally the name Eastermar referred to this community, now It Heechsân, a hamlet to the east of today's Eastermar. In the Middle Ages there were already several farms around the church and to the north and south of It Heechsân.

This 1605 map shows the ancient Burgumer Mar to the northwest of the village, but not yet De Leien, the lake to the south that came into being during the large-scale peat extraction that took place between 1500 and 1750.

During this period, peat workers built a hamlet at the crossing point between a road and a waterway (Lits). This settlement, called De Wâl, was a place of shipping, trade and craft and became the main centre in this area, eventually surpassing the older hamlet and assuming its name, Eastermar.

After 1750, farming became dominant again in this area, and still is.

Until 1989, the village had two formal names (as many Frisian places still do): Eastermar in West Frisian, and Oostermeer in Dutch. The local municipality decided on officially continuing under a single name in both Dutch and Frisian then; a change which is reflected in the single name on the town sign.

== Community ==
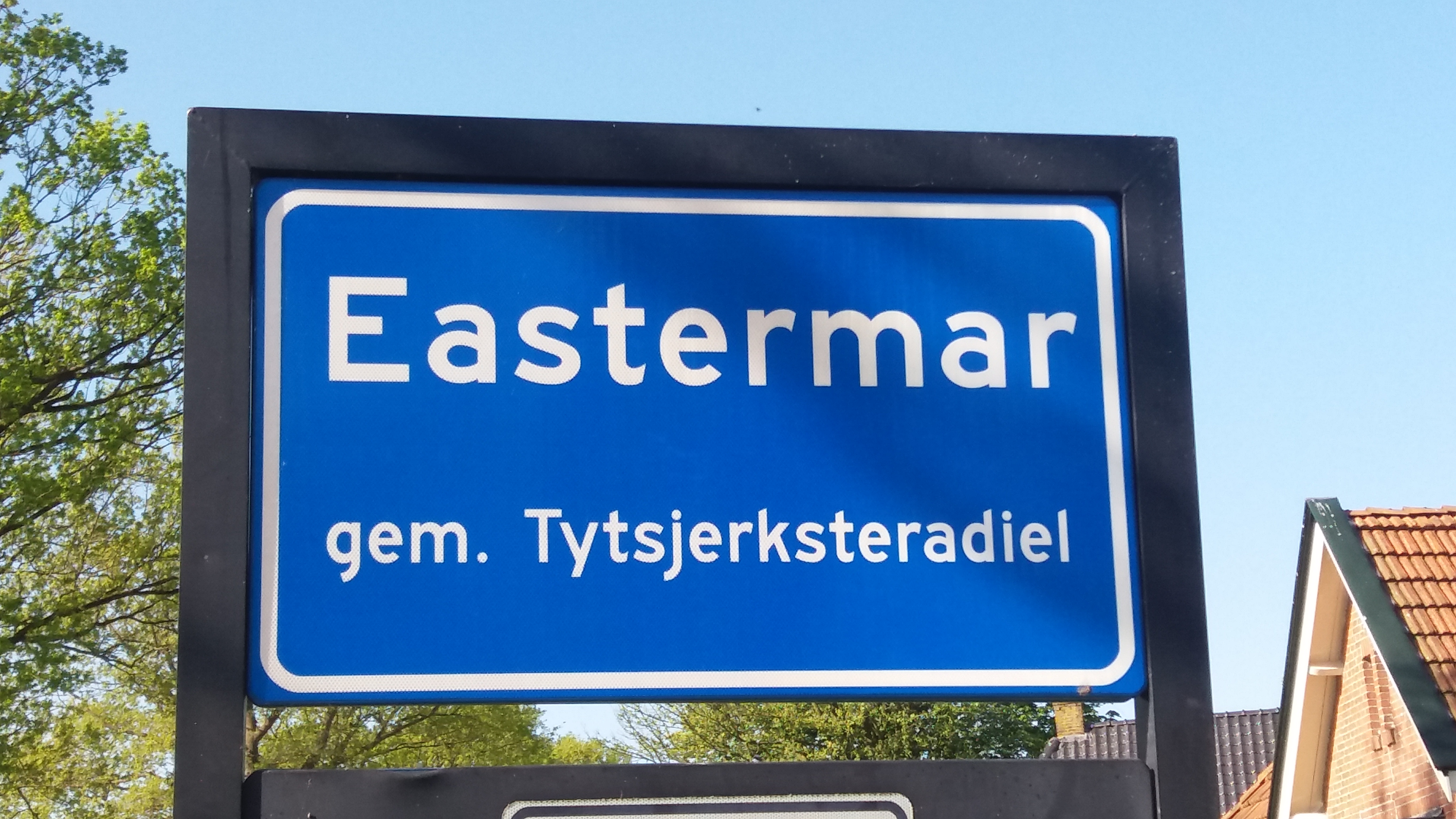
Town sign

=== Population ===
- 1954 - 1415
- 1959 - 1318
- 1964 - 1297
- 1969 - 1265
- 1973 - 1222
- 2006 - 1564

=== Famous (former) residents of Eastermar ===
- Doutzen Kroes (born 1985) - Model

=== Notable buildings ===
- The Former Protestant church of Eastermar
