= Gustave Hansotte =

Belgian architect

Gustave Hansotte (25 May 1827 – 22 March 1886) was a 19th-century Belgian architect, representative of neoclassical architecture and eclectic architecture of Belgium.

== Constructions and buildings ==
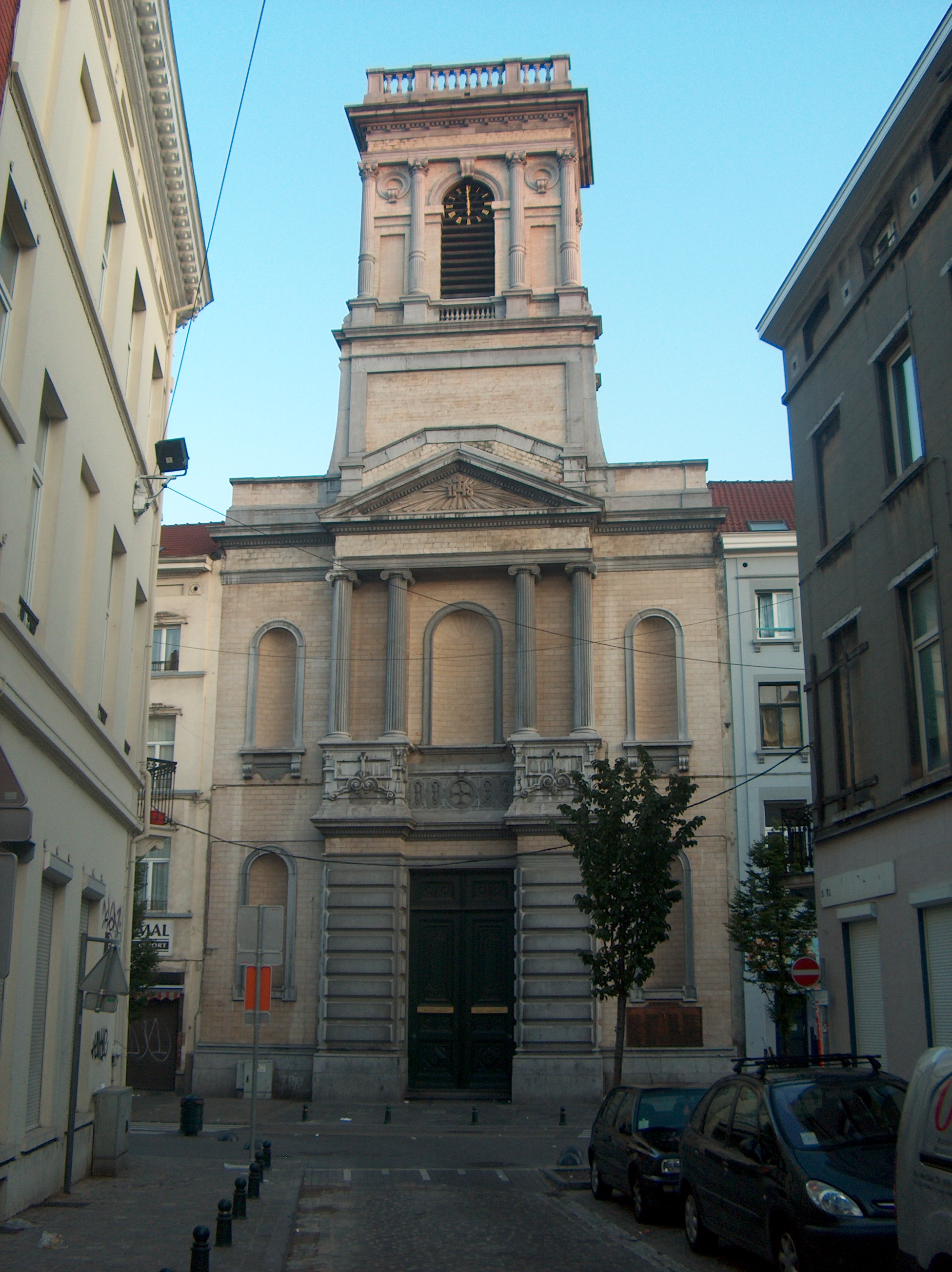
Church of St. John and St. Nicholas

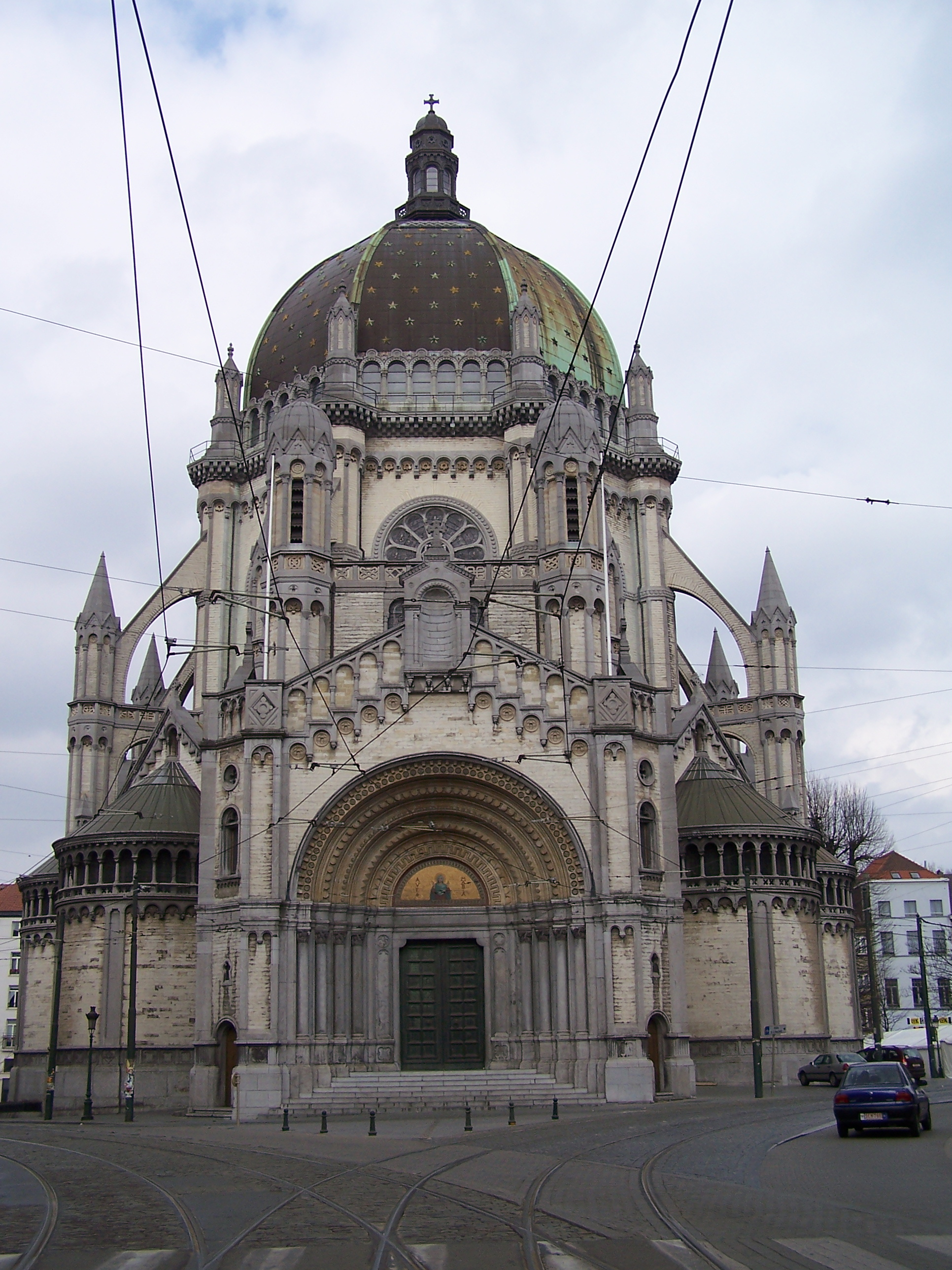
Saint Mary's Royal Church

=== Buildings of neoclassical style ===
- 1847: Church of St. John and St. Nicholas, Rue du Brabant/Brabantstraat in Saint-Josse-ten-Noode, architectes J.P.J. Peeters and Gustave Hansotte
- 1873: Antoine Depage Clinic, Avenue Henri Jaspar/Henri Jasparlaan 101 in Saint-Gilles
- 1884: former Provincial Government of Brabant, Rue du Chêne/Eikstraat 18–22 in Brussels

left wing and three levels of the central wing: G. Hansotte 1884
right wing and upper level of the central wing: G. Hano 1907

=== Buildings of eclectic style ===
- 1849–1953: Saint Mary's Royal Church, Place de la Reine/Koninginneplein in Schaerbeek

neo-Romanesque style (Byzantine-Romanesque)
built by Louis van Overstraeten from 1845 until his death in 1849
completed by Gustave Hansotte from 1849 until 1853

- Halles de Schaerbeek/Hallen van Schaarbeek

burnt down in 1898 and rebuilt in 1901 according to the initial model by the constructor Bertaux

- 1875: former Municipal School no. 1 of Etterbeek, Rue Fétis/Fétisstraat 29–31

eclecticism with neoclassical tendency

- 1882: Oratory of the Sisters of Good Help Home, Rue Musin/Musinstraat 1, Saint-Josse-ten-Noode

neo-Gothic

=== Buildings of indeterminate style ===
- 1863: Town house, Rue Royale/Koningsstraat 284

demolished and replaced by the "Rotterdamsche Verzekering Societeiten" office building (modernist style, 1936)
