= Jean-Baptiste Capronnier =

Belgian stained glass painter (1814–1891)

- Born: Jean-Baptiste Capronnier; 1 February 1814; Brussels, First French Empire
- Died: 31 July 1891 (aged 77); Schaerbeek, Belgium
- Occupation: Painter

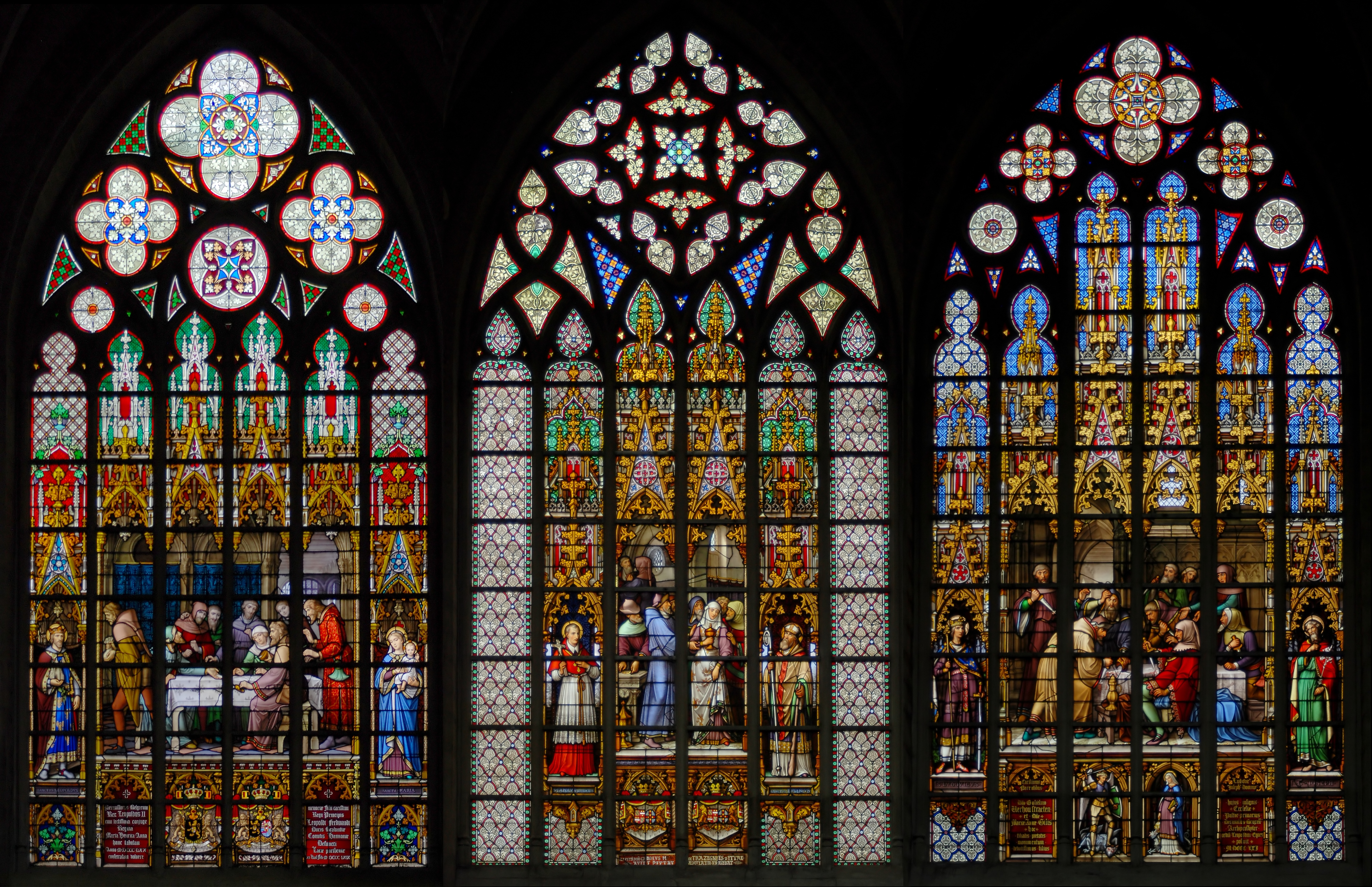
Three scenes of the legend of the Miraculous Sacrament. Stained glass windows in the Cathédrale of Saints-Michel-et-Gudule, Brussels, by Jean-Baptiste Capronnier (c. 1870)

Jean-Baptiste Capronnier (1 February 1814 – 31 July 1891) was a Belgian stained glass painter. Born in Brussels in 1814, he had much to do with the modern revival of glass-painting, and first made his reputation by his study of the old methods of workmanship, and his clever restorations of old examples, and copies made for the Brussels archaeological museum. He carried out windows for various churches in Brussels (including the Église Royale Sainte-Marie), Bruges, Amsterdam, the UK including Howden Minster and elsewhere, and his work was commissioned also for France, Italy and England. At the Paris Exhibition of 1855 he won the only medal given for glasspainting. He died in Schaerbeek in 1891.

Capronnier was also an entomologist specialising in Lepidoptera and he became a Member of the Royal Belgian Entomological Society.

== Entomological titles (selection) ==
- Capronnier, J.B. (1889): Liste des Lépidoptères capturés au Congo. Bulletin de la Société Entomologique de Belgique 1889:118–127.
- Capronnier, J.B. (1889): Liste d’une collection de lépidoptères recueillis au Gabon avec la description de quatres espèces nouvelles. Bulletin de la Société Entomologique de Belgique 1889:141–148.
