= Protestant church of Burgum =

Church in Burgum, Netherlands

Protestant church of Burgum Saint Martin’s church
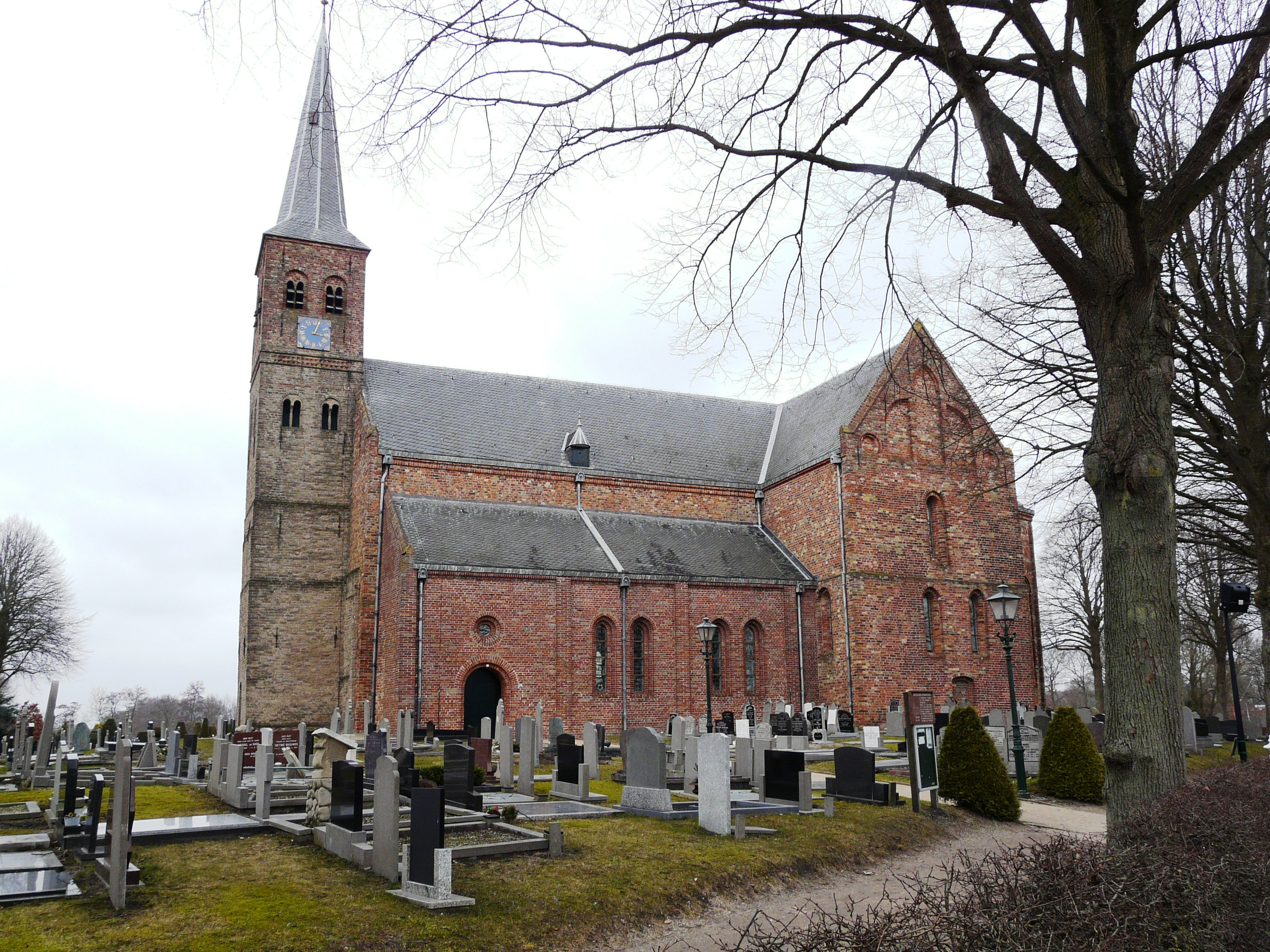
- Church of Burgum
- Protestant church of Burgum; Saint Martin’s church
- 53.1962°N 6.0018°E

History
- Dedication: Before the Reformation, to Saint Martin

The Protestant church of Burgum or Cross Church or Saint Martin's church is a religious building in Burgum, Netherlands, one of the medieval churches in Friesland.

The tuffstone edifice was built c. 1100 and was enlarged about a century later. It was again enlarged about a century after that and possesses a monumental Pipe organ that was built from 1783 to 1788 by L. van Dam & Zn. from Leeuwarden.

The church is located on the Nieuwstad 5 and was once a Roman Catholic church dedicated to Saint Martin but became a Protestant church after the Protestant Reformation. It is listed as a Rijksmonument, number 35634 and is rated with a very high historical value.
