= Van der Molen =

Van der Molen is a Dutch toponymic surname meaning "from the mill". People with this name include:

- Gary Vandermolen (born 1960), English-Israeli footballer
- Gezina van der Molen (1892–1978), Dutch legal scholar and resistance fighter
- Jan van der Molen (1924–2015), Dutch structural engineer working in Indonesia and Australia
- Tim van de Molen, New Zealand politician

== See also ==
- Jorge Fandermole (1956- ), Argentinian folk singer with a Hispanicized version of the surname
- Van der Meulen, surname with the same origin
