= Vermeulen =

Vermeulen is a Dutch toponymic or occupational surname, meaning "from the (wind/water) mill" (modern Dutch: molen). It is a contraction of the surname Van der Meulen. In the Netherlands 20,633 people carried the name in 2007, making it the 30th most common surname, while in Belgium 13,552 people were named Vermeulen in 2008, making it the 11th most common name there.

People with the name Vermeulen, VerMeulen, Vermeule, or Vermeulin include:

Vermeule

- Adrian Vermeule (b. 1968), American legal scholar
- Blakey Vermeule (b. 1966), American British literature scholar
- Emily Vermeule (1928–2001), American classical scholar and archaeologist
- Cornelius Clarkson Vermeule I (1859–1950), American civil engineer
- Cornelius Clarkson Vermeule II (1895–1943), American WWI soldier and civil engineer
- Cornelius Clarkson Vermeule III (1925–2008), American art historian and museum curator

Vermeulen

- Adrian Vermeulen (b. 1990), South African rugby player
- Alex Vermeulen (b. 1954), Dutch multimedia artist
- Alexey Vermeulen (b. 1994), American racing cyclist
- Amy Vermeulen (b. 1983), Canadian football (soccer) forward
- André Vermeulen (b. 1955), Belgian journalist and television personality
- Andries Vermeulen (1763–1814), Dutch painter
- Angelo Vermeulen (b. 1971), Belgian visual artist and scientist
- Arjan Vermeulen (b. 1969), Dutch footballer
- Benjamin Vermeulen (b. 1957), Belgian racing cyclist
- Bram Vermeulen (1946–2004), Dutch singer, composer and cabaretier
- Chris Vermeulen (b. 1982), Australian motorcycle racer
- Cornelis Vermeulen (1644–1708), Flemish Baroque engraver
- Demi Vermeulen (b. 1995), Dutch Paralympic equestrian
- Duane Vermeulen (b. 1986), South African rugby player
- Eddy Vermeulen (="Ever Meulen") (b. 1946), Belgian illustrator and comic strip artist
- Edouard Vermeulen (b. 1957), Belgian fashion designer
- Elvis Vermeulen (b. 1979), French rugby union player
- Éric Vermeulen (b. 1954), French racing cyclist
- Erik Vermeulen (b. 1959), Belgian jazz pianist
- Esmee Vermeulen (b. 1996), Dutch swimmer
- Ferdinand Vermeulen Krieger (1782–1865), Royal Netherlands East Indies Army officer
- Gidion Vermeulen, South African lawn bowler
- Gijs Vermeulen (b. 1981), Dutch rower
- Hendrik Vermeulen (b. 1982), South African fashion designer
- Herman Vermeulen (b.1954), Belgian footballer
- Inge Vermeulen (1985–2015), Dutch field hockey player
- Jaap J. Vermeulen (b. 1955), Dutch botanist
- Jacques Vermeulen (b. 1995), South African rugby player
- Jeff Vermeulen (b. 1988), Dutch racing cyclist
- Johannes Vermeulen (1533–1585), also known as Molanus, Flemish Catholic theologian
- John Vermeulen (1941–2009), Flemish author
- Jorn Vermeulen (b. 1987), Belgian footballer
- Kevin Vermeulen (b. 1990), Dutch footballer
- Klaas Vermeulen (b. 1988), Dutch field hockey player
- Koert Vermeulen (b. 1967), Belgian lighting designer
- Lisanne Vermeulen (b. 1985), Dutch footballer
- Luc Vermeulen, Flemish nationalist activist
- Mark Vermeulen (b. 1979), Zimbabwean cricketer
- Matatumua Maimoaga Vermeulen (1935–2012), Samoan politician, nurse and environmentalist
- Matthijs Vermeulen (1888–1967), Dutch composer and music journalist
- Michael VerMeulen (1956–1995), American magazine editor
- Petrus Jacobus Franciscus Vermeulen (1846–1913), Dutch politician
- Pierre Vermeulen (b. 1956), Dutch football player and coach
- Riaan Vermeulen (b. 1984), South African rugby player
- Robert Vermeulen (b. 1955), American punk rock musician
- Roeffie Vermeulen (1906–1963), Dutch Olympic sailor
- Robert Vermeulen (="Tesco Vee") (b. 1955), American punk rock musician
- Thijs Vermeulen (b. 1985), Dutch basketball player
- Sita Vermeulen (b. 1980), Dutch pop singer
- Sjerstin Vermeulen, Dutch swimmer and equestrian
- Walter Vermeulen, Samoan / Belgian surgeon, farmer and environmentalist
- Waltie Vermeulen (b. 1988), South African rugby union player
- William VerMeulen, American French horn player

Vermeulin

- Michel Vermeulin (b. 1934), French racing cyclist

== See also ==
- Van der Meulen
- Matthijs Vermeulen Award, named after the Dutch composer
- Vermeulenia, a genus of orchids named after the Dutch botanist Elthino Vermeulen (1899–1981)
