= Daniel Vandermeulen =

Canadian educator

- Occupation: College educator
- Known for: President of Nunavut Arctic College; Nunavut Deputy Minister of Executive and Intergovernmental Affairs; President Emeritus of Northern Lakes College

Daniel Vandermeulen is a Canadian educator.

He became president of Nunavut Arctic College in 2007.

In August 2012, he was appointed Nunavut's Deputy Minister of Executive and Intergovernmental Affairs, and Secretary to Cabinet.

Previously working in Alberta, he is President Emeritus of Northern Lakes College, and past president of Northern Lakes College (1987-2005).
