= Saint Mary's Royal Church =

Church in Schaerbeek, Belgium

- Église Royale Sainte-Marie (French); Koninklijke Sint-Mariakerk (Dutch)
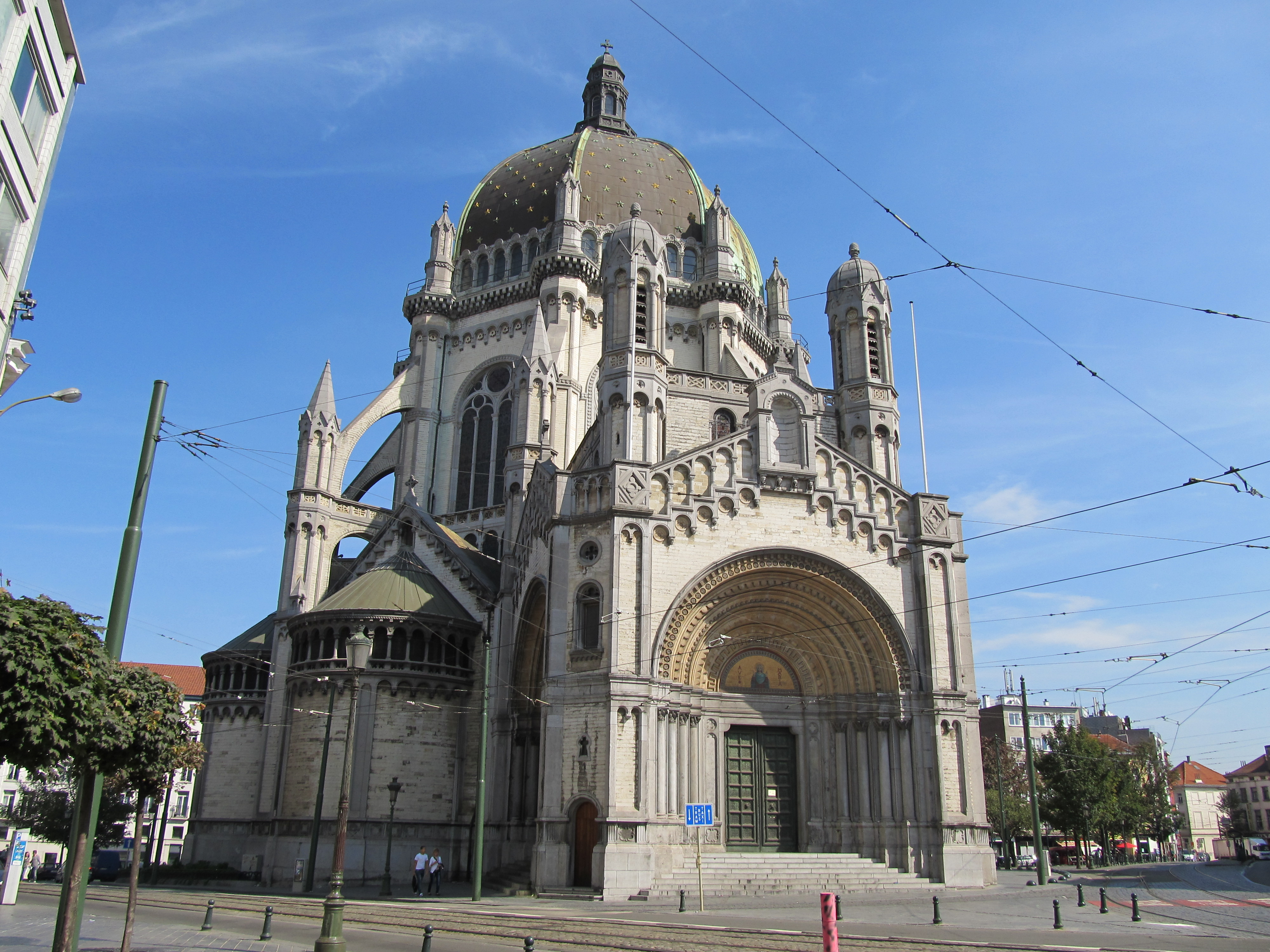
- St. Mary's Royal Church in Schaerbeek
- Saint Mary's Royal Church
- 50°51′33″N 4°22′08″E
- Location: Place de la Reine / Koninginneplein; 1030 Schaerbeek, Brussels-Capital Region
- Country: Belgium
- Denomination: Catholic Church

History
- Status: Parish church
- Dedication: Our Lady of the Assumption (official); Queen Louise-Marie (unofficial)

Architecture
- Functional status: Active
- Heritage designation: Protected
- Designated: 09/11/1976
- Architect(s): Louis Van Overstraeten, Louis Roelandt, Gustave Hansotte
- Architectural type: Church
- Style: Eclecticism; Romanesque Revival; Gothic Revival
- Groundbreaking: 1845
- Completed: 1888

Administration
- Archdiocese: Mechelen–Brussels

Clergy
- Archbishop: Luc Terlinden (Primate of Belgium)

Saint Mary's Royal Church (French: Église Royale Sainte-Marie; Dutch: Koninklijke Sint-Mariakerk) is a Catholic parish church located on the Place de la Reine/Koninginneplein in Schaerbeek, a municipality of Brussels, Belgium. Officially dedicated to Our Lady of the Assumption, it is popularly associated with Queen Louise-Marie, first Queen of the Belgians, as is the square where it is located, which earned it the title of "Royal".

== History ==
=== Construction ===
The building was designed by the architect Louis Van Overstraeten and built between 1845 and 1888 in an eclectic style combining neo-Romanesque and neo-Gothic elements with influences from Byzantine and Roman architecture. Following Van Overstraeten's death in 1849, his father-in-law Louis Roelandt took over the management of the works, then the architect Gustave Hansotte after Roelandt's death in 1864. The stained glass windows were designed and crafted by the artist Jean-Baptiste Capronnier. Although unfinished, the church was opened to worship on 15 August 1853.

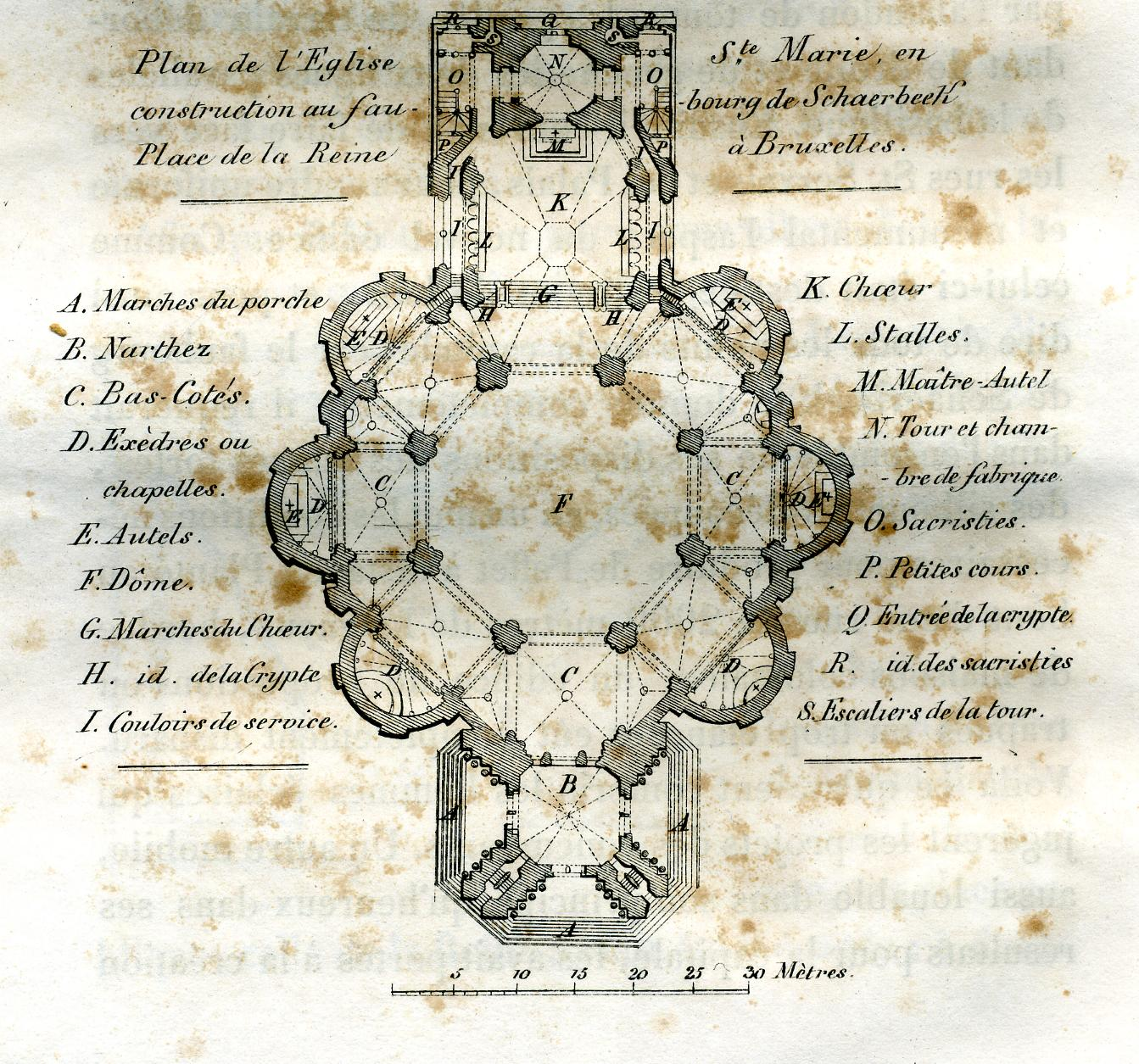
Floor plan of Saint Mary's by Louis Van Overstraeten (1849)

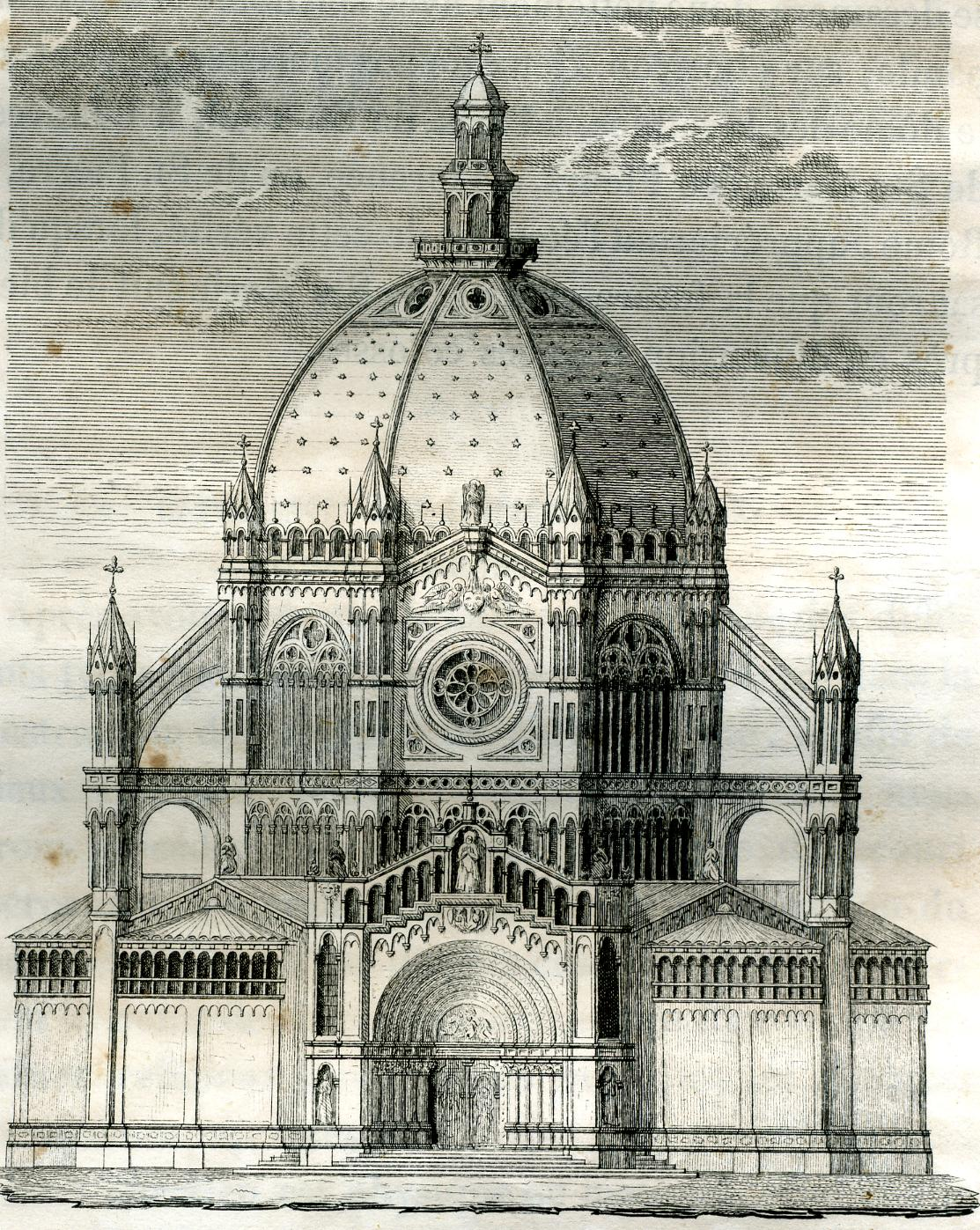
Early drawing of the church project (Van Overstraeten, 1850)

After Hansotte's death in 1866, the architects François Thomisse and Alexandre Struyven took over as directors of the site. The completion works were finally accepted on 11 January 1888. A long period of interior fittings then began, continuing well beyond the church's solemn consecration, which took place on 14 October 1902, feast of Our Lady of the Rosary, by the archbishop of Mechelen Cardinal Goossens.

=== Repairs and protection ===
As early as 1870, the building required costly repairs to remedy rainwater infiltration caused by repeated interruptions during construction. Despite punctual restoration work over the next seventy years, the deterioration continued after World War II. Following the fall of several stones on the street below in 1963, the crown of the tower attached to the side of the church, designed by Hansotte, was demolished, and the church was ultimately closed in 1965, its condition considered too dangerous.

The building received protected status through a royal decree issued on 9 November 1976. It was the subject of a restoration campaign from 1982 to 1996. A fire that occurred on 8 September 1985, however, destroyed the already restored dome and roofs and abruptly interrupted the works. The restoration restarted in 1992 and ended in 1994, with the church finally reopening on 17 April 1996.

== Description ==
Structurally, the body of the church is an octagon, the southern side of which opens onto the porch, and the northern side onto a rectangle that houses, in elevated form, the sanctuary, and in the basement, a large crypt. Eight pillars around the perimeter of an inner circle 25 metres (82 ft) in diameter form the building's framework. A 5-metre-wide (16 ft) ambulatory surrounds this circular nave. Six chapels occupy the other sides of the octagon. The pillars are linked to each other by horseshoe arches. A staircase leads up to the sanctuary. To the right and left of the stairs, two flights of steps descend to the Romanesque-style crypt, with, on the lower floor, a "sub-crypt". (Note: The crypt's large size, in a church associated by its location with the Belgian monarchy, suggested that it had been designed with a view to becoming the resting place of the Belgian royal family.)

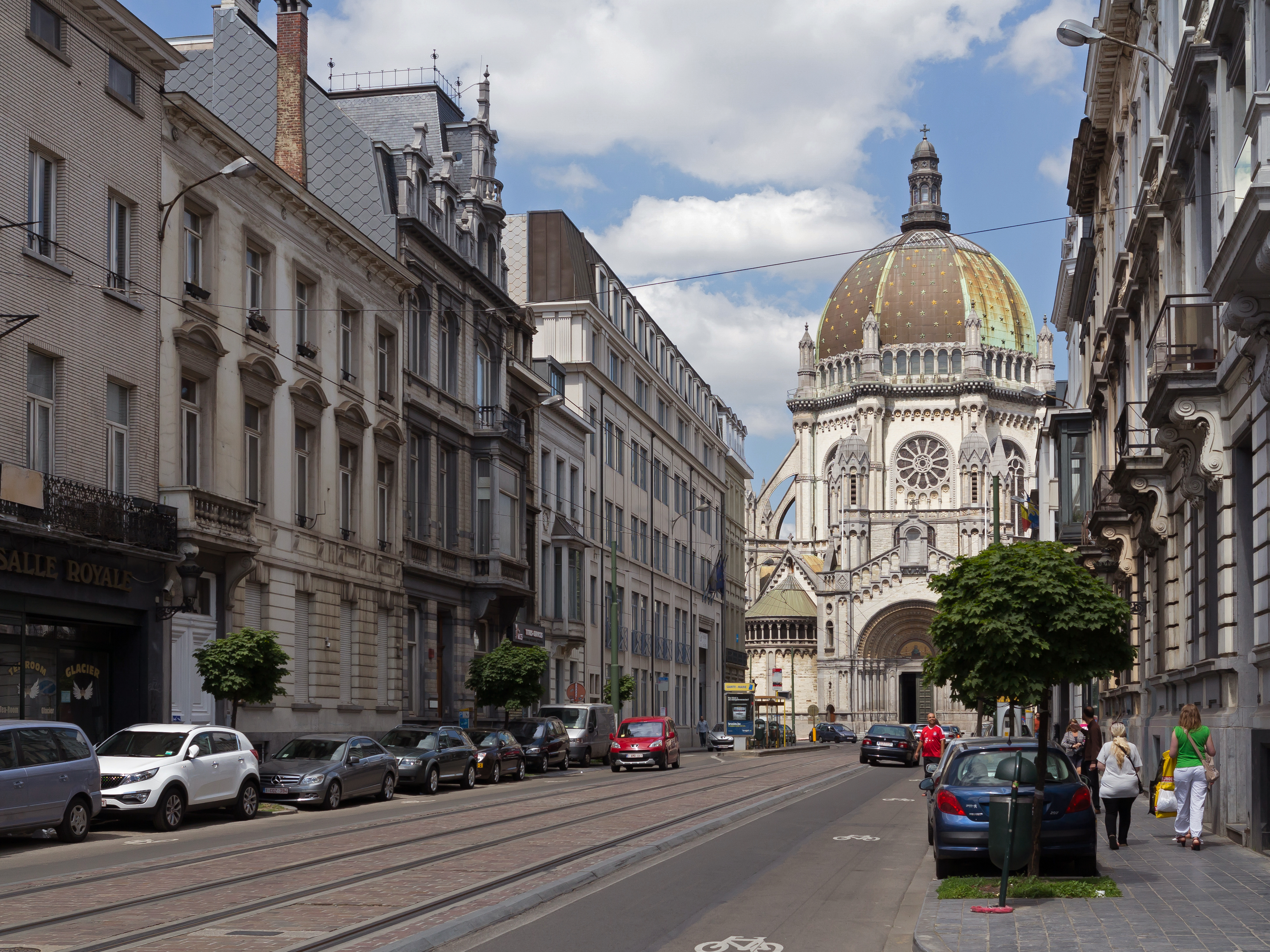
The church from the Rue Royale/Koningsstraat in nearby Saint-Josse-ten-Noode

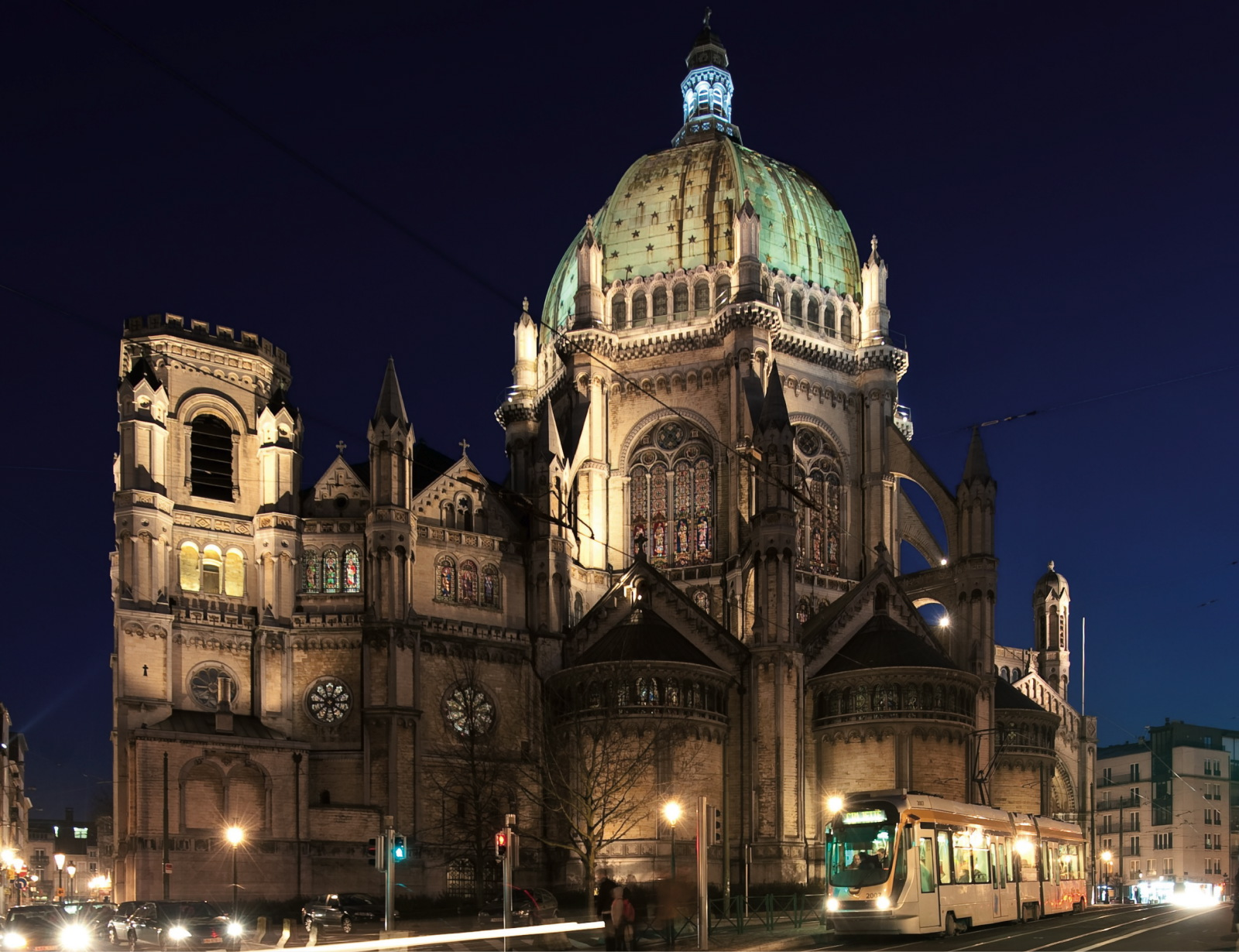
View of the church by night

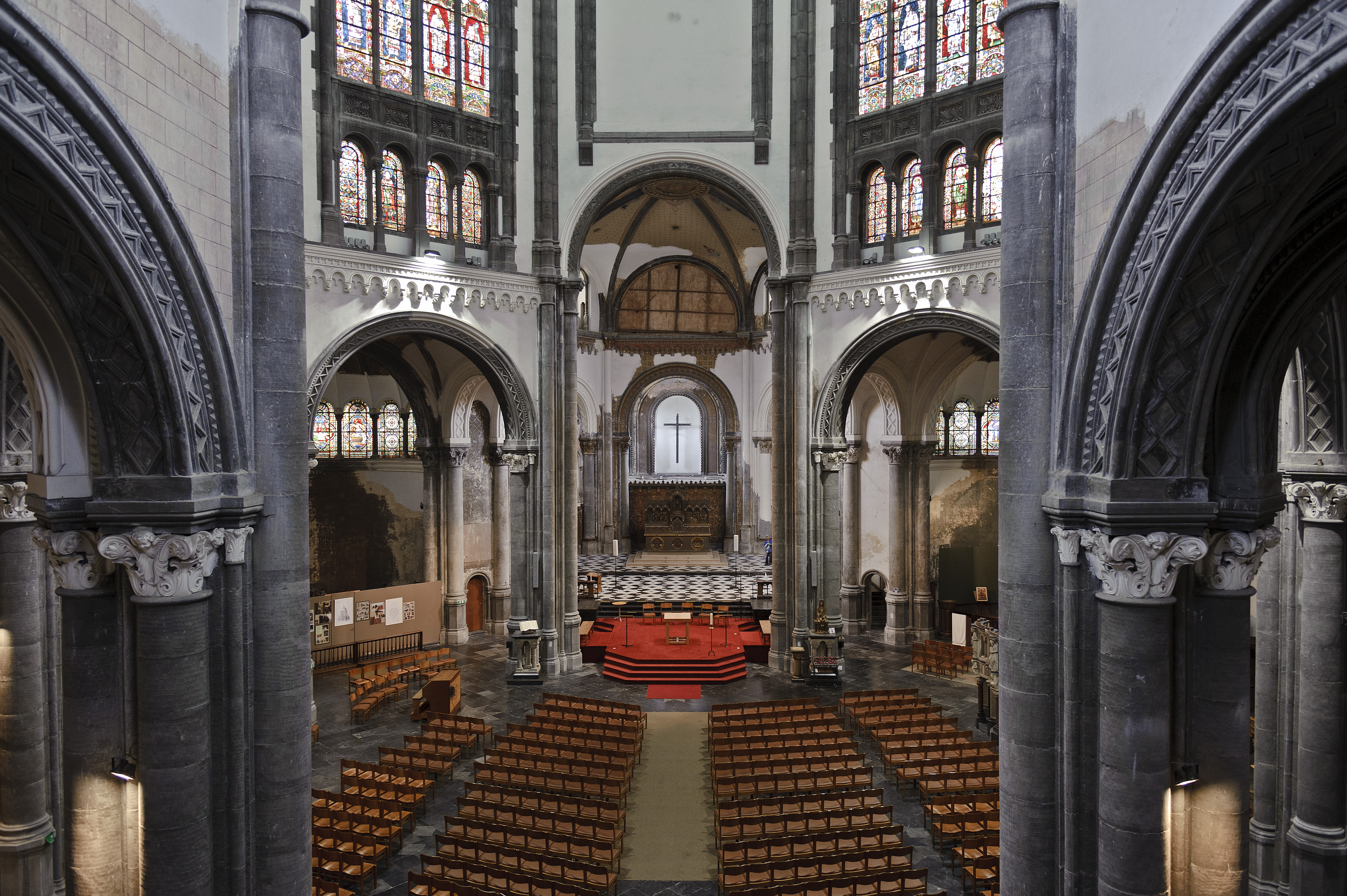
Inside view

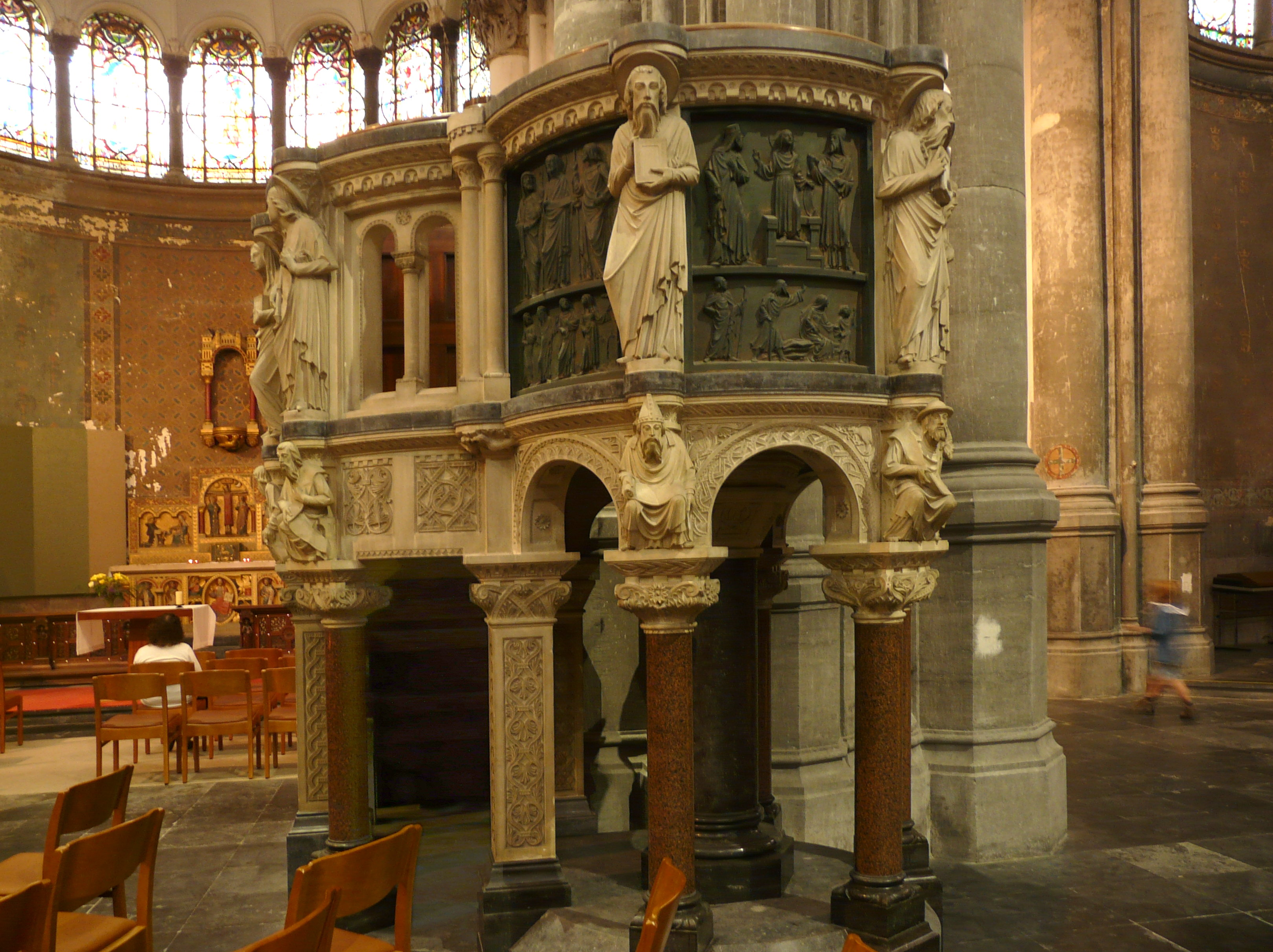
The pulpit

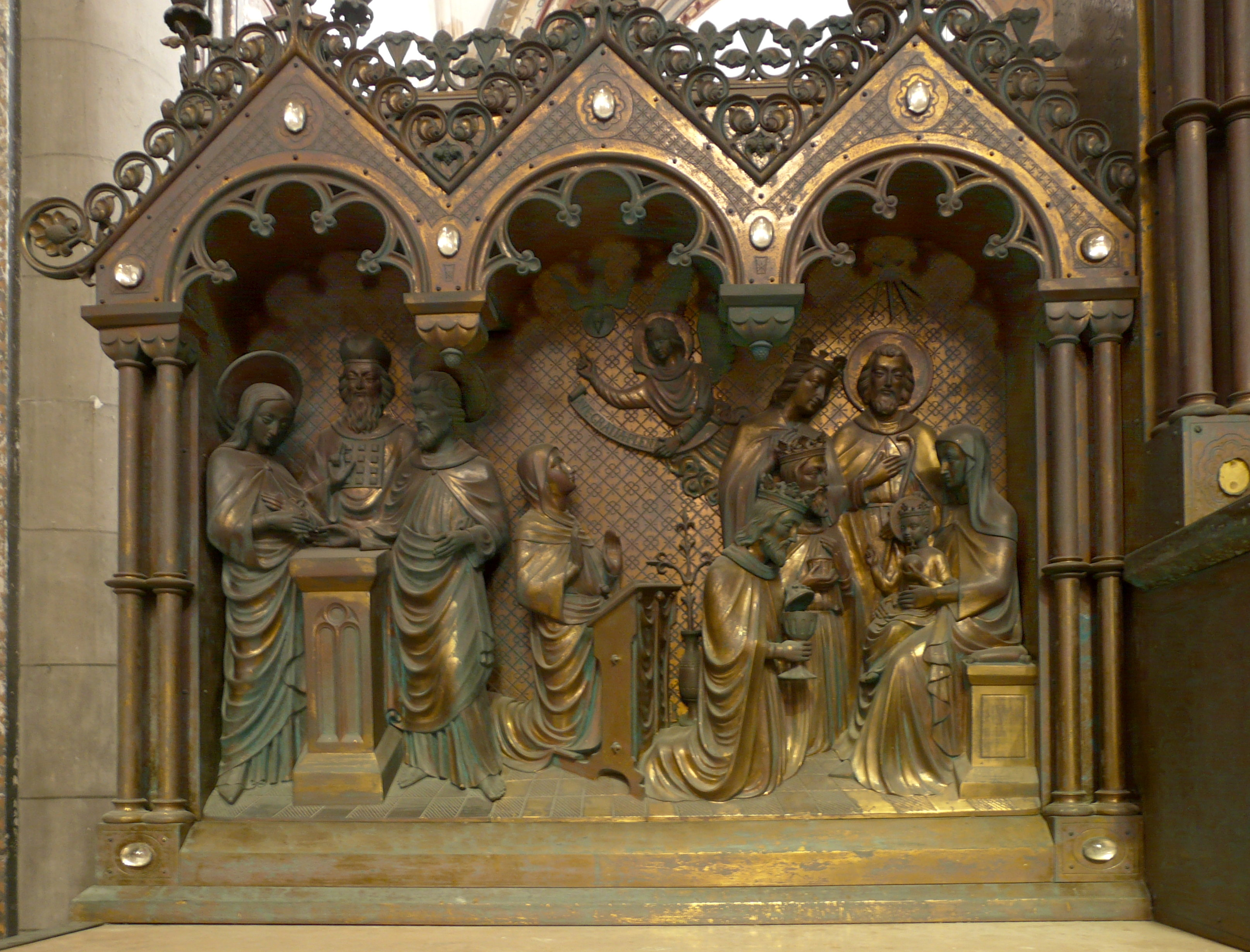
The retable

== See also ==
- List of churches in Brussels
- Catholic Church in Belgium
- History of Brussels
- Culture of Belgium
- Belgium in the long nineteenth century
