= Tsjibbe Gearts van der Meulen =

Dutch writer

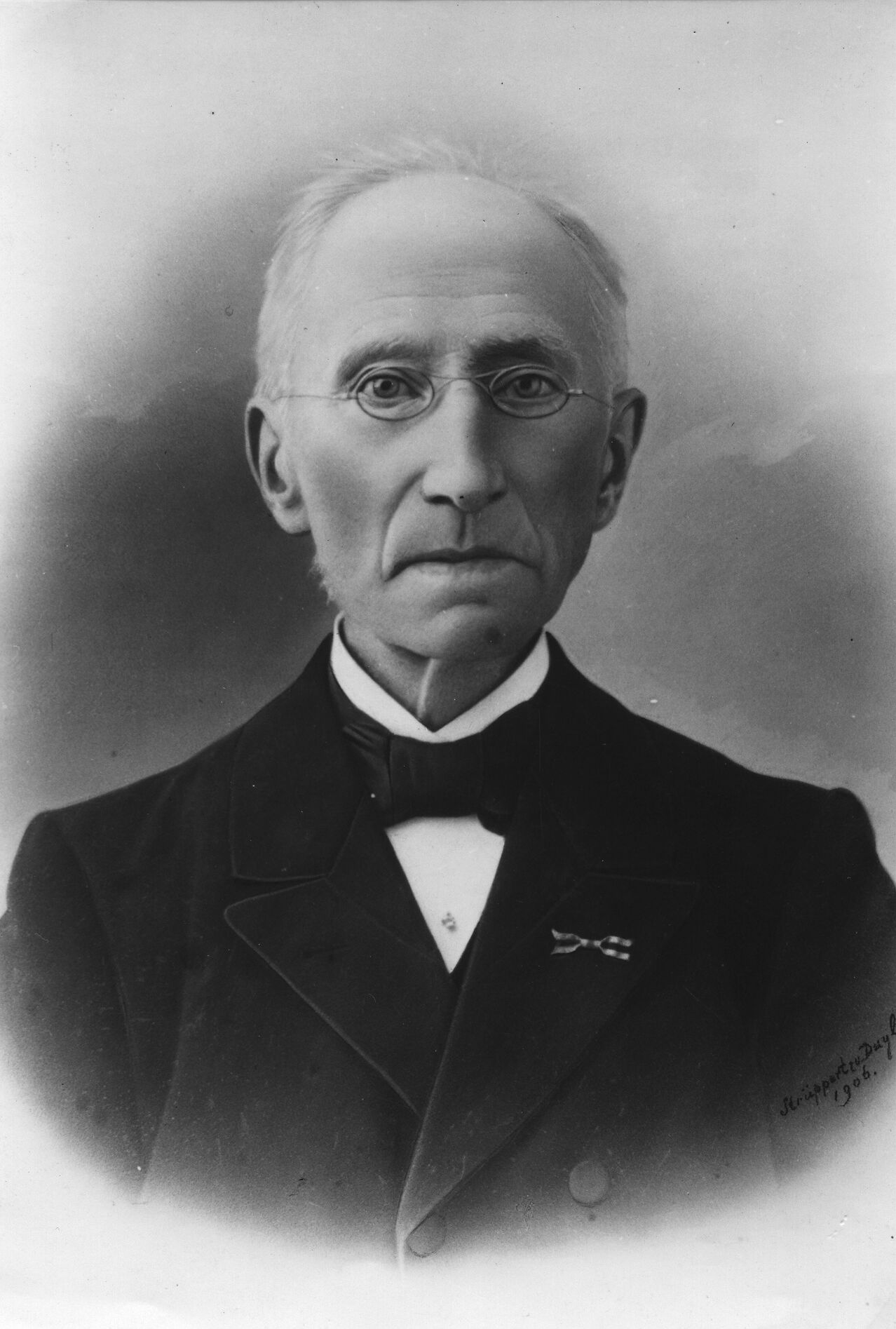
Tsjibbe Gearts van der Meulen

Tsjibbe Gearts van der Meulen (May 6, 1824 – March 16, 1906) was a West Frisian-language writer and poet from the town of Burgum in the Dutch province of Friesland. He was also a clock-maker, book seller, printer and publisher.

Most of his work is collected in Ald en nij (Old and new), a work of almost 700 pages, published after his death (in 1908) by his son Wigger Arnoldus. In 1974 an anthology of his autobiographical stories called In brulloft yn'e Wâlden en oare wiere forhalen (A wedding in the Woods and other true stories) was published.
