= Burgum =

Burgum Bergum
- Village
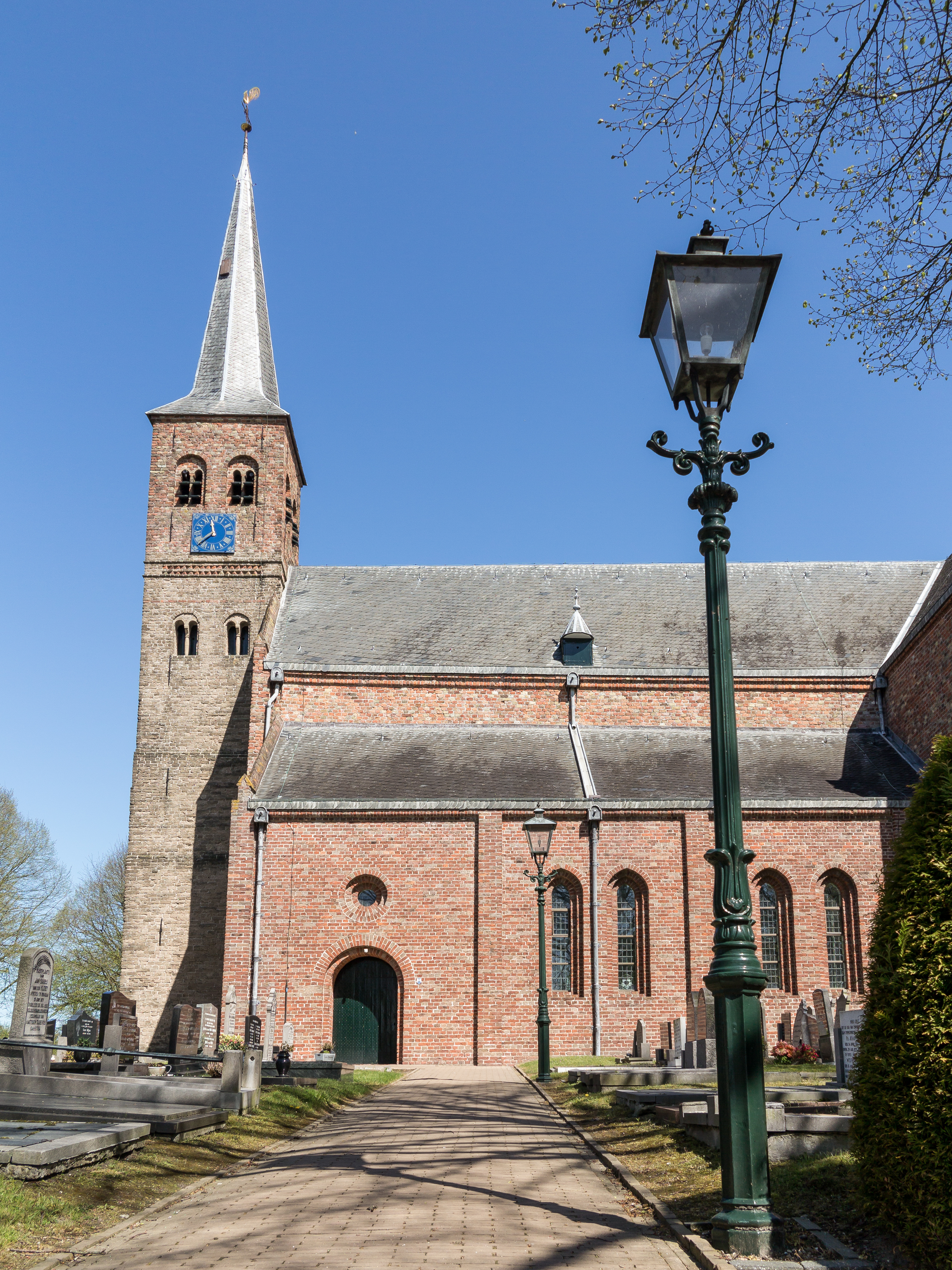
- Burgum, church: de Kruiskerk

- Flag Coat of arms

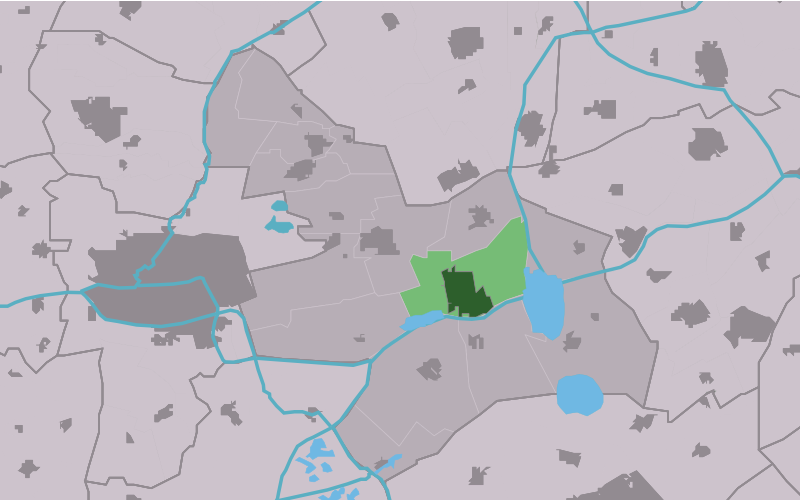
- Location of the village in Tytsjerksteradiel

- Location in the Netherlands Burgum (Netherlands)
- Country: Netherlands
- Province: Friesland
- Municipality: Tytsjerksteradiel

Population (1 January 2017)
  - Total: 10,058
- Time zone: UTC+1 (CET)
  - Summer (DST): UTC+2 (CEST)
- Postal code: 9251
- Dialing code: 0511

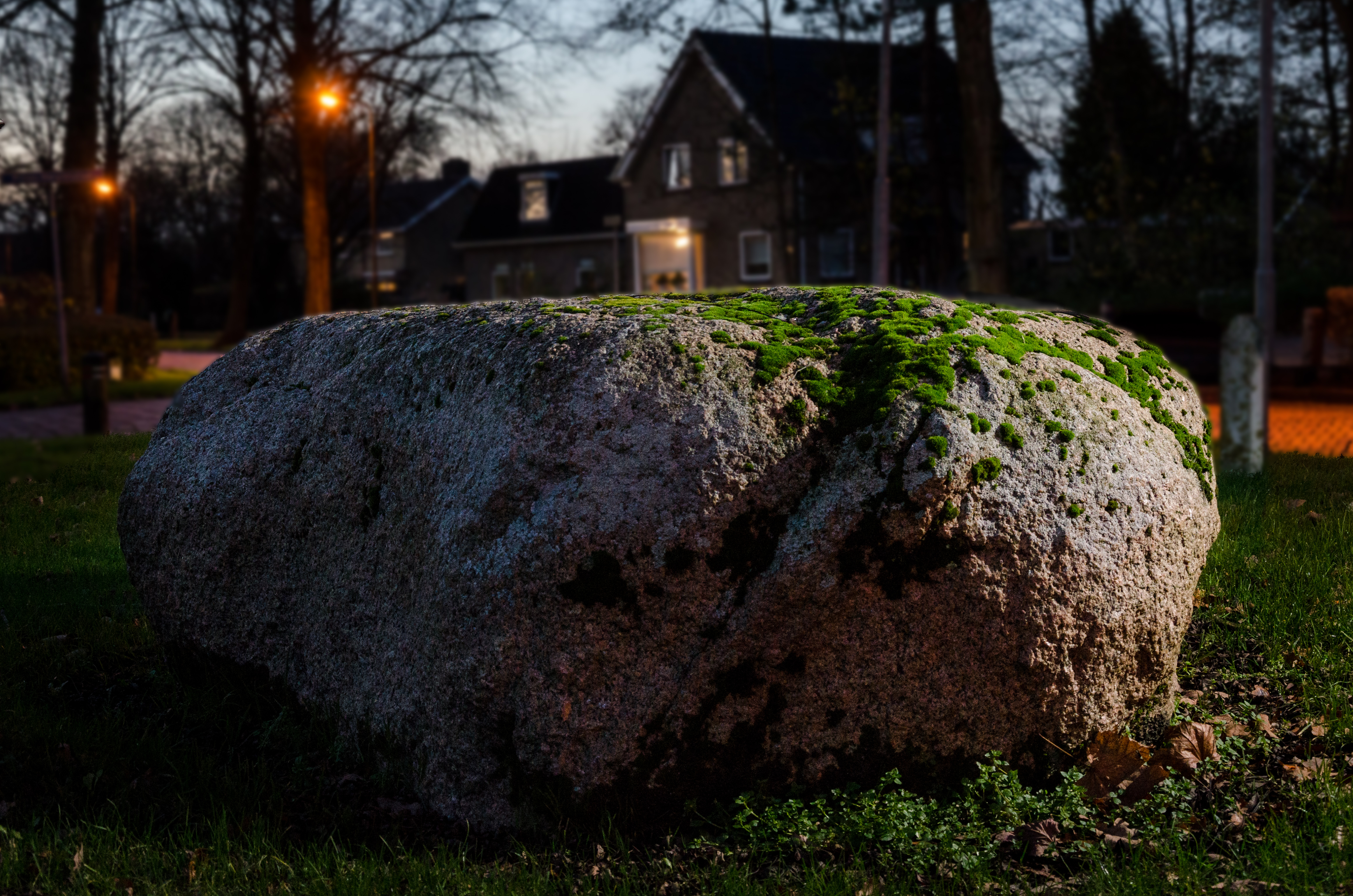
De Poppestien, Burgum

Burgum is the largest and administrative town of the municipality of Tytsjerksteradiel, in the Dutch province of Friesland. It had a population of 10,058 inhabitants in January 2017.

On 1 January 1989 the official name of the village was changed from Bergum to Burgum. This was done to match the Frisian name of the village. Bergum is the current name in Dutch.

The name Burgum is suggestive of an area of higher altitude than the surrounding area. The province of Friesland is bordered in the north by the Wadden Sea. In ancient and medieval times, habitation in Friesland occurred only in those areas which were elevated above sea level (for example in Burgum) or on artificially built mounds known as terp, weird or ward. These mounds were areas of refuge in times of flooding. The artificial mounds became redundant after the building of the dykes on the border of the Wadden Sea. Habitation of this area goes back to the Stone Age.

Main things to see in Burgum are the Town Hall and the Krústsjerke (Cross Church) which is the remainder of a convent burned in the Eighty Years' War. Friesland is renowned for its many lakes and canals. One of these lakes is found nearby the village of Burgum and it is called the Burgumer Mar. Another object of interest is the so-called Poppestien. A large stone deposited in this area during the last ice age (11,000 BC). In ancient times this stone was used in fertility rituals.

== Notable buildings ==
- Protestant church of Burgum
- The Municipality center of Tytsjerksteradiel

== Notable people associated with Burgum ==
- Hendrik Bulthuis - Amateur boat builder and designer of the Bergumermeer-class sailing-boat (“B.M.-er”)
- Tsjibbe Gearts van der Meulen - Frisian writer and poet
- Joke van Rijssel, long track speed skater
- Rombertus van Uylenburgh - One of the founders of the University of Franeker
