= Zuidwolde =

Zuidwolde may refer to:

- Zuidwolde, Drenthe
- Zuidwolde, Groningen
