= Noordwolde =

Noordwolde may refer to:

- Noordwolde, Friesland, a village in the Dutch province of Friesland
- Noordwolde, Groningen, a village in the Dutch province of Groningen
