= Bedum =

Bedum Beem (Gronings)
- Former municipality
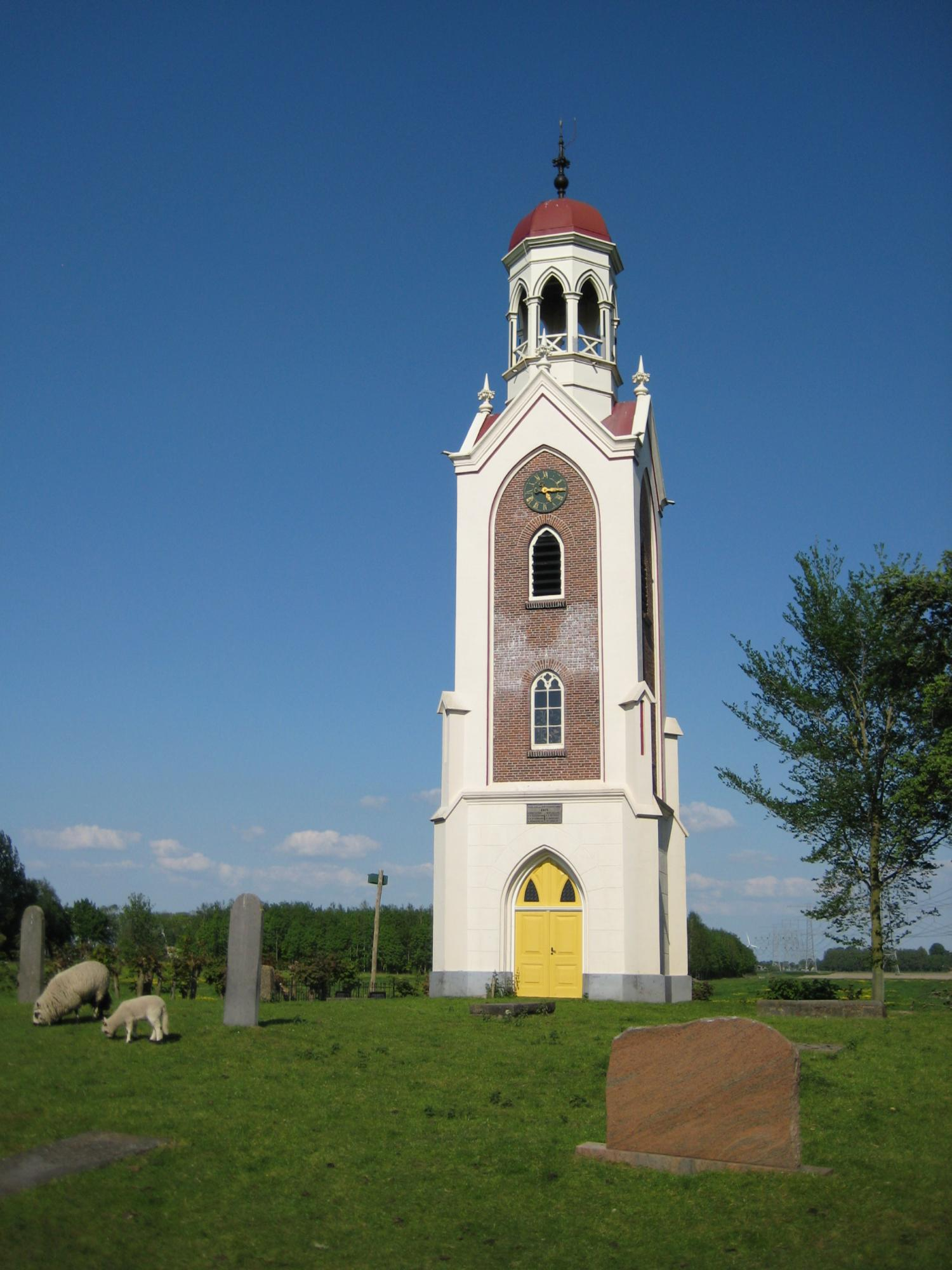
- Church in Westerdijkshorn

- Flag Coat of arms

- Location in Groningen

- Location in the Netherlands Bedum (Netherlands)
- Coordinates: 53°18′N 6°36′E
- Country: Netherlands
- Province: Groningen

Area
  - Total: 25.03 km^{2} (9.66 sq mi)
- Elevation: −1 m (−3.3 ft)

Population (2021)
  - Total: 8,650
  - Density: 346/km^{2} (895/sq mi)
- Time zone: UTC+1 (CET)
  - Summer (DST): UTC+2 (CEST)
- Postcode: 9781
- Area code: 050
- Website: www.bedum.nl

Bedum (Dutch: [ˈbeːdʏm]; Gronings: Beem [beɪ̯m]) is a former municipality and a town in the northeastern Netherlands. Populated by an unknown number of inhabitants (data missing) in 2021, Bedum is one of the larger of Groningen's several satellite towns. On 1 January 2019 it merged with the municipalities of De Marne, Eemsmond and Winsum to form the new municipality Het Hogeland.

Bedum is the site of three supermarkets, several pubs, and a leaning church tower, dubbed "the leaning tower of Bedum". Footballer Arjen Robben was born in Bedum (23 January 1984).

Bedum has a railway station - Bedum railway station.

== The leaning tower ==
Bedum's 36-metre tower of the St Walfridus church has been calculated as now leaning at a greater angle than the Leaning Tower of Pisa. If both towers were the same height, Bedum's would have a greater displacement by 6 cm.

== Former population centres ==
- Bedum
- Noordwolde
- Onderdendam
- Zuidwolde
- Ellerhuizen
- Westerdijkshorn

== Notable people ==
- Arjen Robben, professional footballer

== Gallery ==
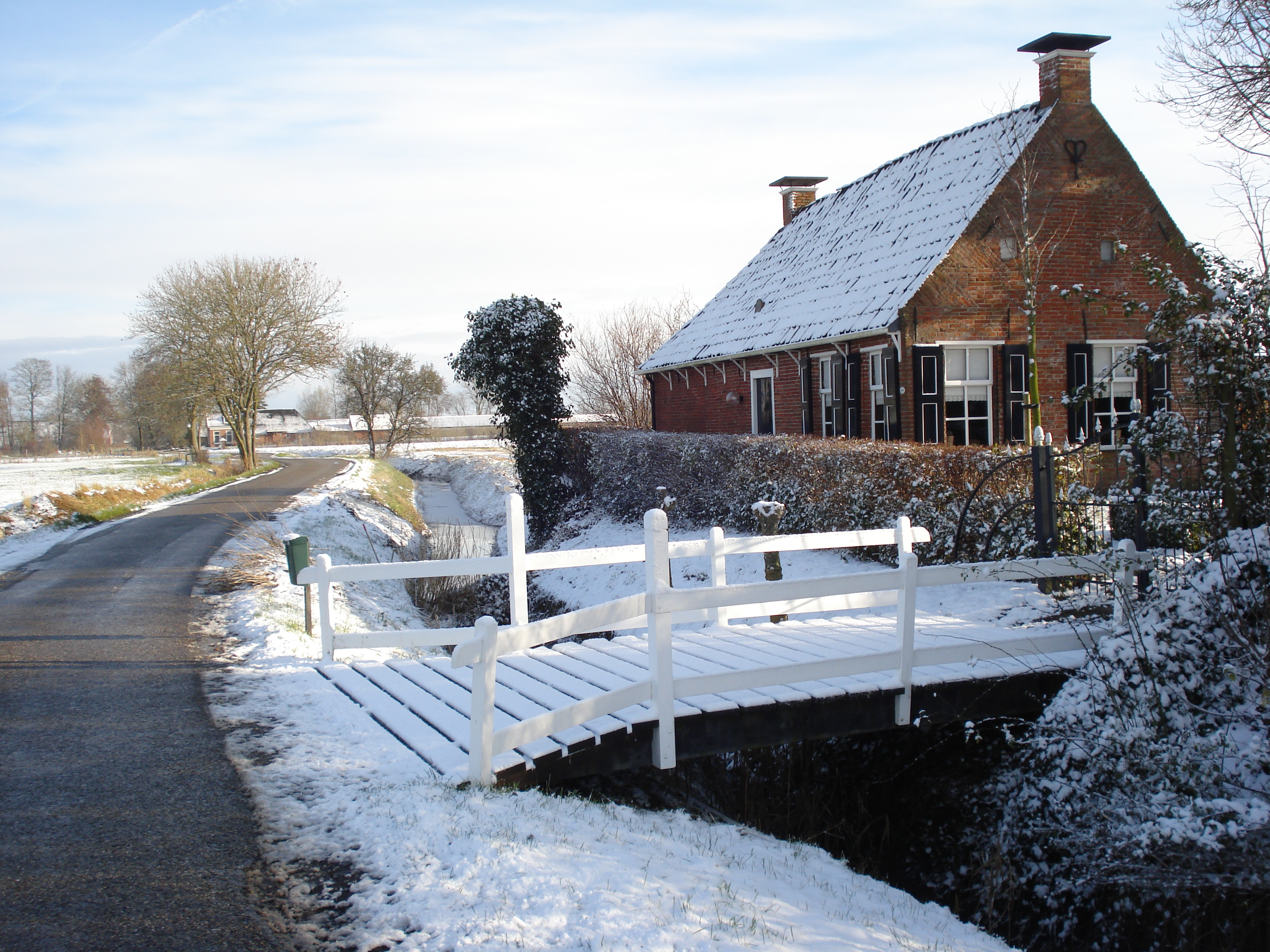
't Blauw Borgje in winter

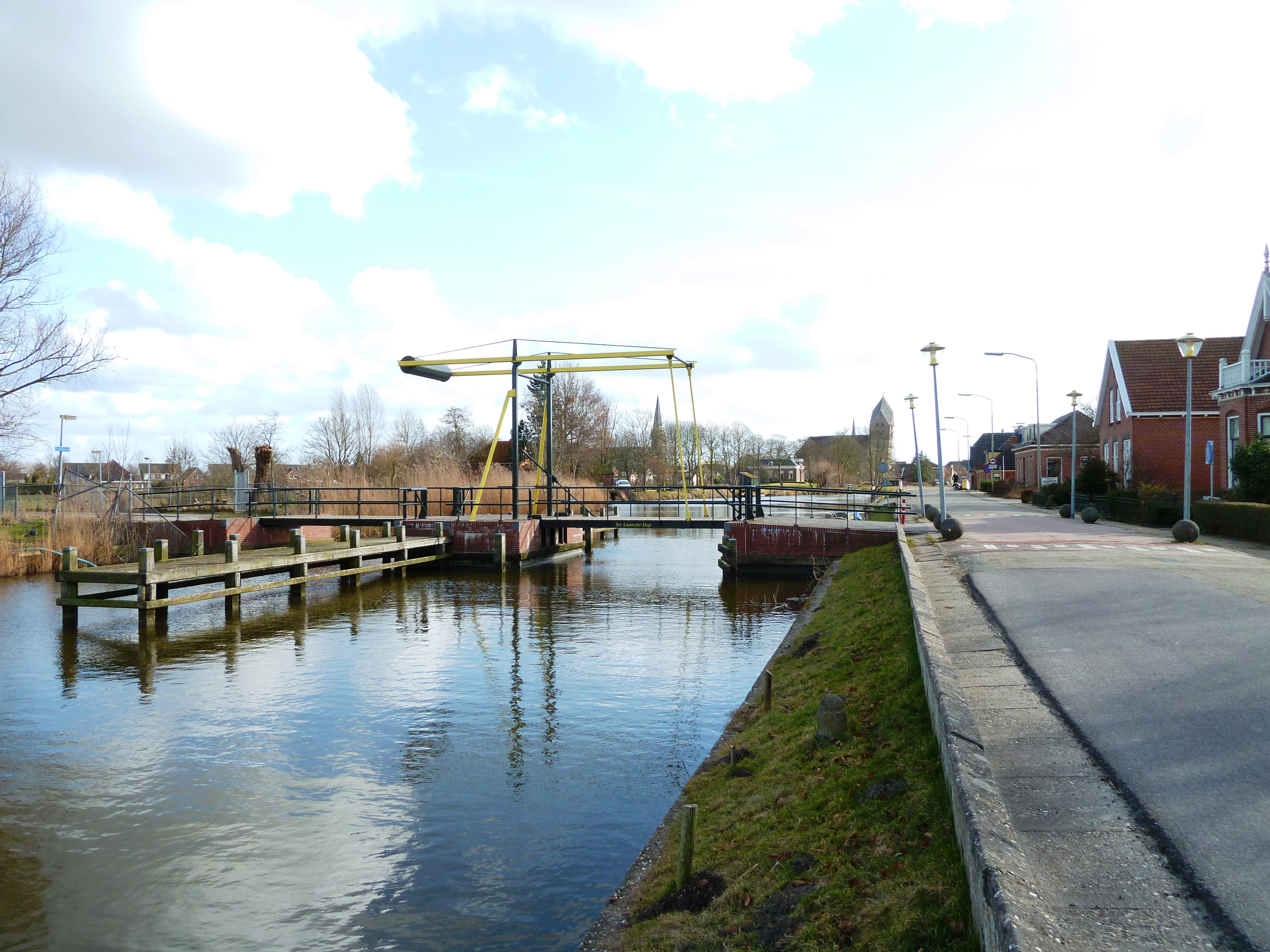
Bridge over Boterdiep

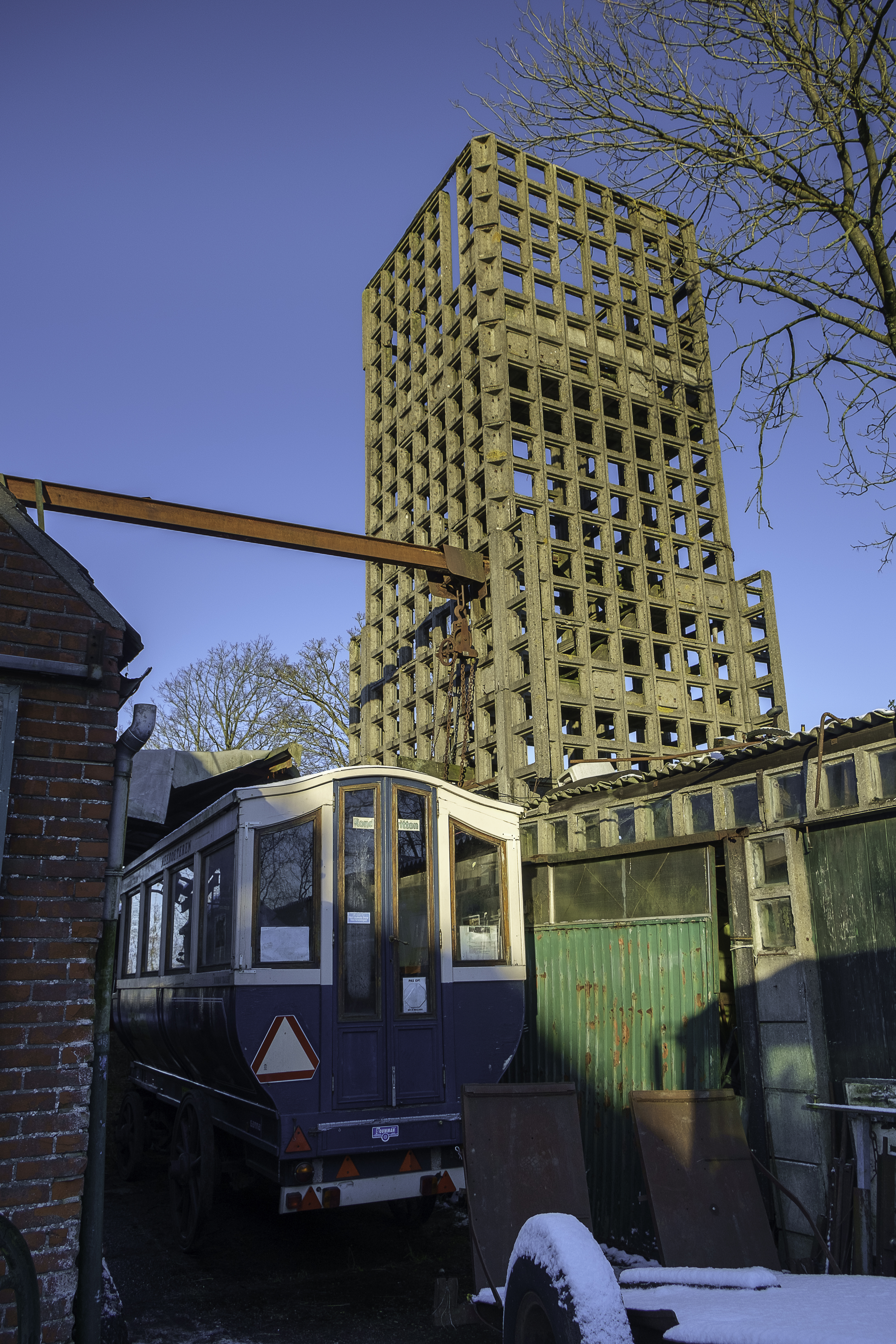
Air watchtower in Bedum

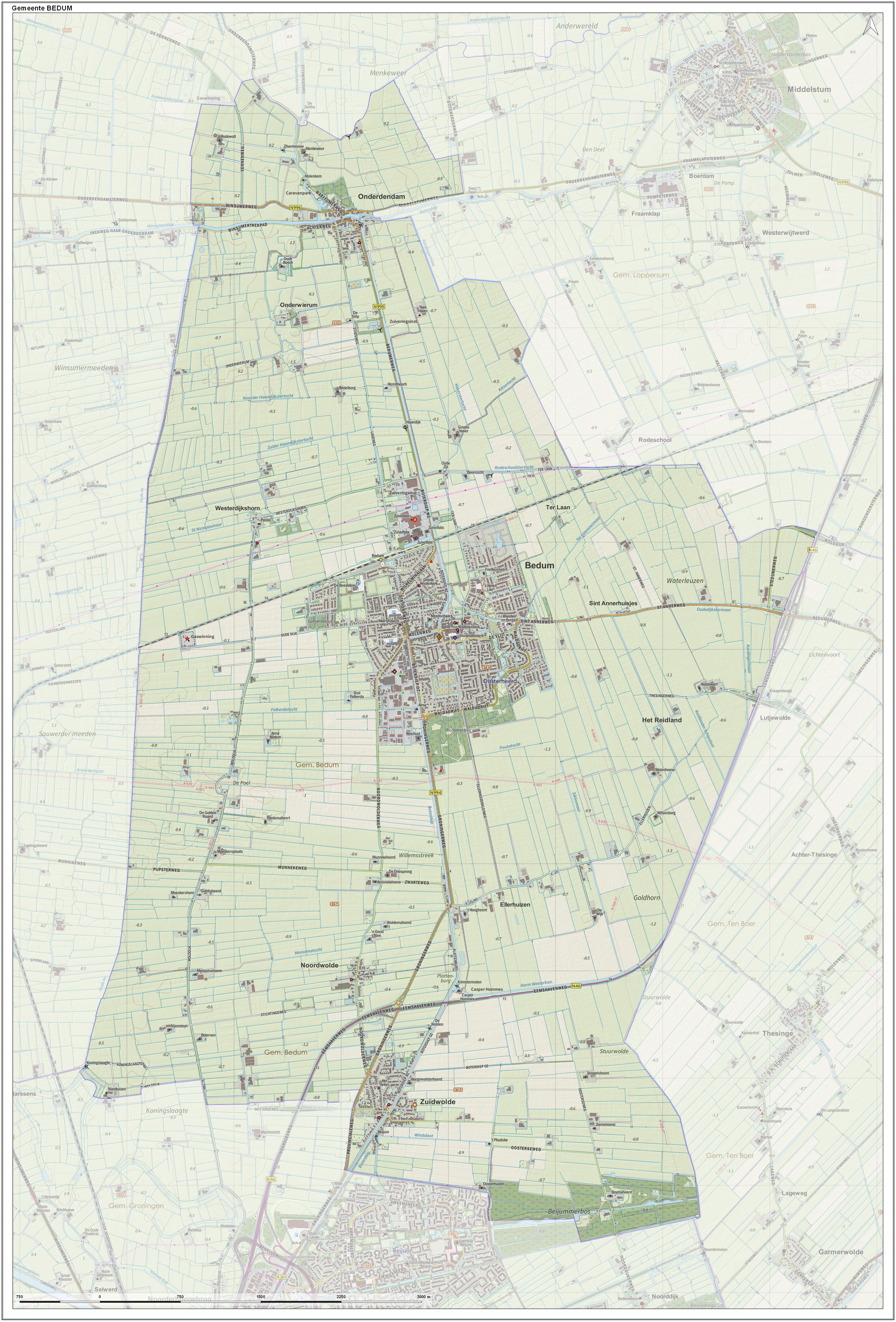
Topographic map of Bedum, June 2015
