= St. Walfriduskerk =

Church in Groningen, Netherlands

St. Walfridus kerk
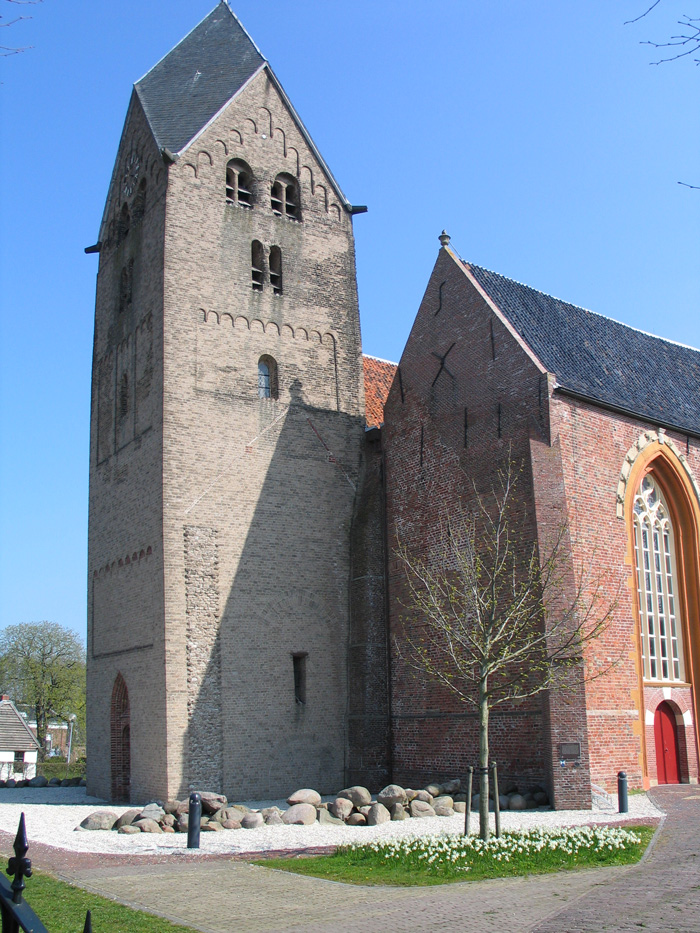
- St. Walfridus kerk
- St. Walfridus kerk
- 53°18′01″N 6°36′09″E
- Location: Bedum, Groningen (province)
- Country: Netherlands

History
- Status: Church
- Dedication: Saint Walfridus

Architecture
- Designated: 11th century
- Architectural type: Church
- Style: Romanesque, Gothic

Specifications
- Height: 35.7 m (117 ft 2 in)
- Materials: Brick

St. Walfridus kerk is a church in Bedum, Netherlands, dedicated to Saint Walfridus. The church was founded in 1050.

== Background ==
When Bedum became a place of pilgrimage because of the graves of martyrs Walfridus and Radfridus two churches were built, originally in wood; later, as stone and brick churches with improvements to the St Walfridus church into the 16th century because of its regional significance as a pilgrimage church. Of the chapel of Radfridus nothing remains above the ground, and the St. Walfridus church did not survive in good state either due to a downturn in pilgrimages after the 16th century.

== Building detail ==
In ca. 1050 work started on a three-aisled cruciform basilica in Romanesque style, which was completed in the 12th century. Of this church only the tower remains. Traces of arches indicate that this tower originally was part of a reduced westwork, with spaces flanking the tower on both sides. These were demolished soon after. The tower leans forward, more than any other tower in the country. It is argued that the tower leans more than the Leaning Tower of Pisa, due to restoration at the latter site.

Of the original nave only a few pillars and a small piece of wall have survived. In ca. 1484 the church was enlarged into a two-aisled hall-church. The southern side-aisle was replaced by a new one in Gothic style which was of the same height and width as the nave. The southern transept-arm was renewed in the same style and completely integrated in the side-aisle. On the northern side either a lower side-aisle or a series of chapels was added. An incomplete transept-arm is still recognizable. In the first decades of the 16th century a new Gothic choir with an ambulatory was built, fit for the church's use by a chapter, which was demolished by the Protestants in ca. 1600. In about the same period the walls of the northern transept-arm were lowered and partly rebuilt. Later the complete northern wall was renewed.

The sagging of the tower has been a problem for a long time. In the 17th century buttresses were added, which already needed replacing in ca. 1800 and were again demolished in the 1850s. During a restoration in 1953-1958 a more permanent solution was found by adding an underground counter-weight. The same restoration resulted in the lozenge roof of the tower, which replaced a flat roof that had covered the tower ever since a fire destroyed the spire in 1911.
