= Noordwolde, Groningen =

Noordwolde
- Village
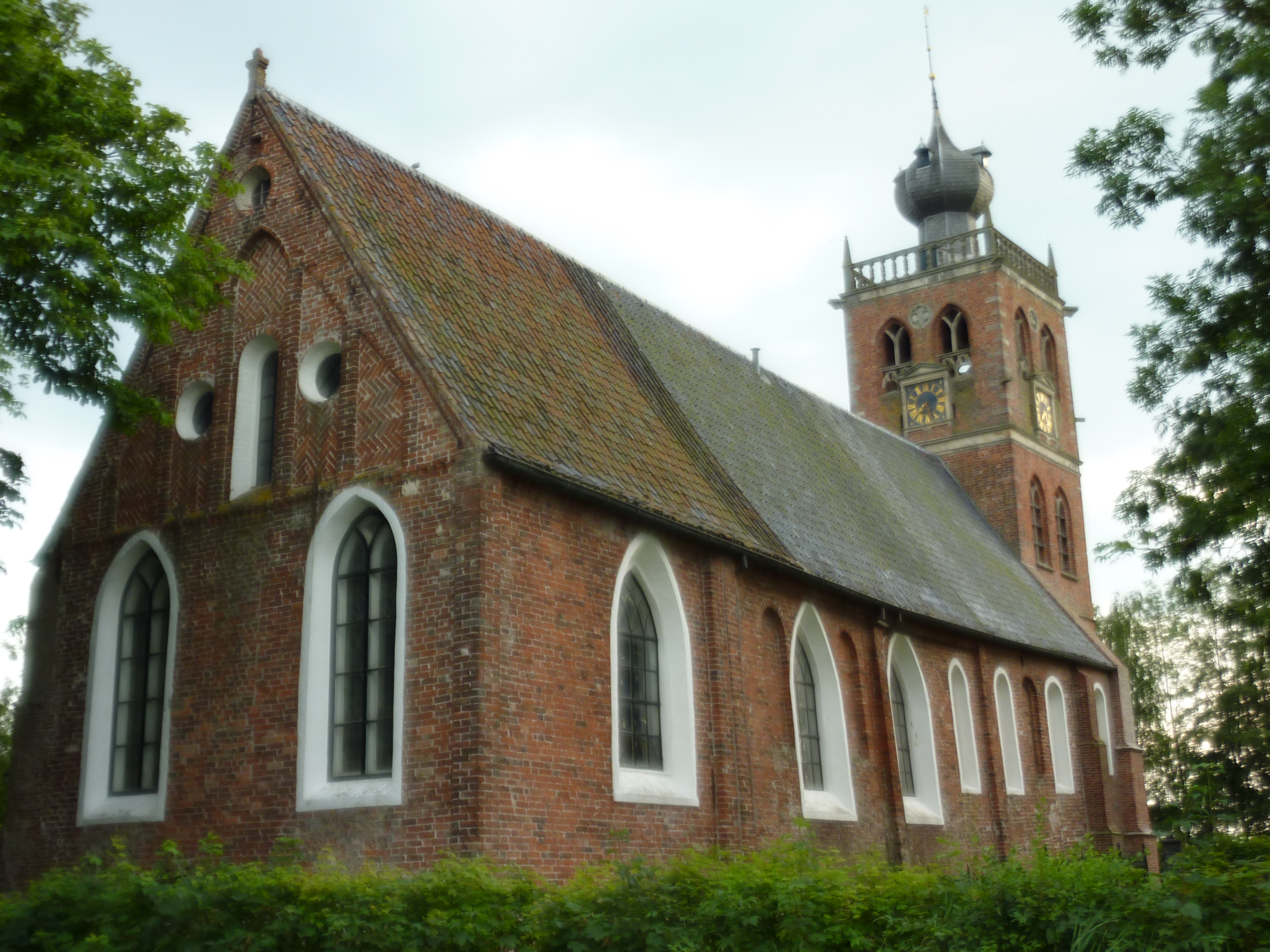
- Noordwolde Church

- Location in the province of Groningen in the Netherlands Noordwolde (Netherlands)
- Coordinates: 53°16′N 6°35′E
- Country: Netherlands
- Province: Groningen
- Municipality: Het Hogeland

Area
  - Total: 6.19 km^{2} (2.39 sq mi)
- Elevation: −0.3 m (−0.98 ft)

Population (2021)
  - Total: 260
  - Density: 42/km^{2} (110/sq mi)
- Time zone: UTC+1 (CET)
  - Summer (DST): UTC+2 (CEST)
- Postal code: 9784
- Dialing code: 050

Noordwolde (Dutch pronunciation: [ˈnoːrtˌʋɔldə]) is a village in Het Hogeland municipality in the province of Groningen, the Netherlands. It had a population of around 275 in January 2017.

== History ==
The village was first mentioned in 1384 as Nordawalda, and means "northern woods". Noord (north) was added to distinguish between Zuidwolde. Noordwolde developed in the middle ages in a forest rich moorland. It was initially built on small house terps (artificial living hills), but developed into a linear settlement with two churches: Noordwolde and Zuidwolde.

The Dutch Reformed church is built without transepts in the late-13th century, but has been modified several times throughout its history. The tower has an onion-shaped spire which was added in 1639.

Noordwolde was home to 275 people in 1840.

The draw bridge Ellerhuizerklap was constructed over the Boterdiep between 1927 and 1929. The bridge has one arm, due to the angular crossing. One armed bridges are very rare prior to 1940. Noordwolde used to be part of the municipality of Bedum. In 2019, it became part of the municipality of Het Hogeland.

== Gallery ==
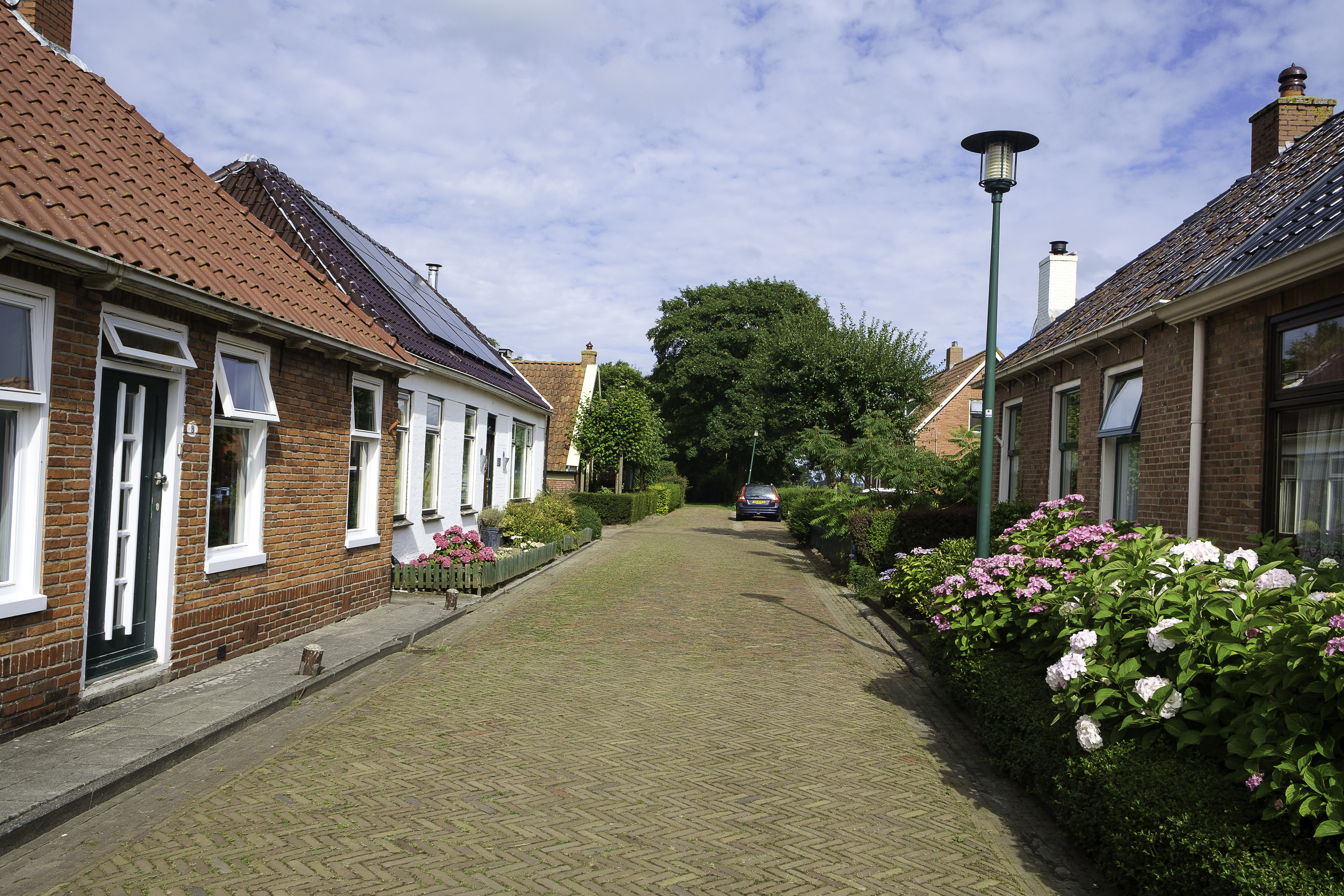
Street view

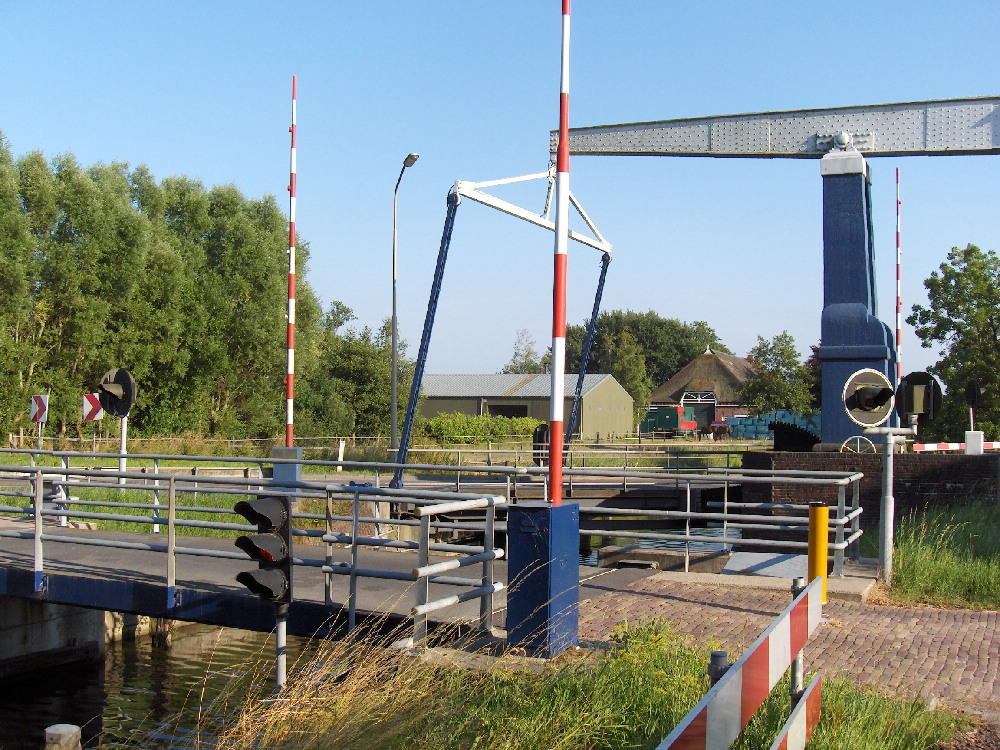
One armed draw bridge Ellerhuizerklap

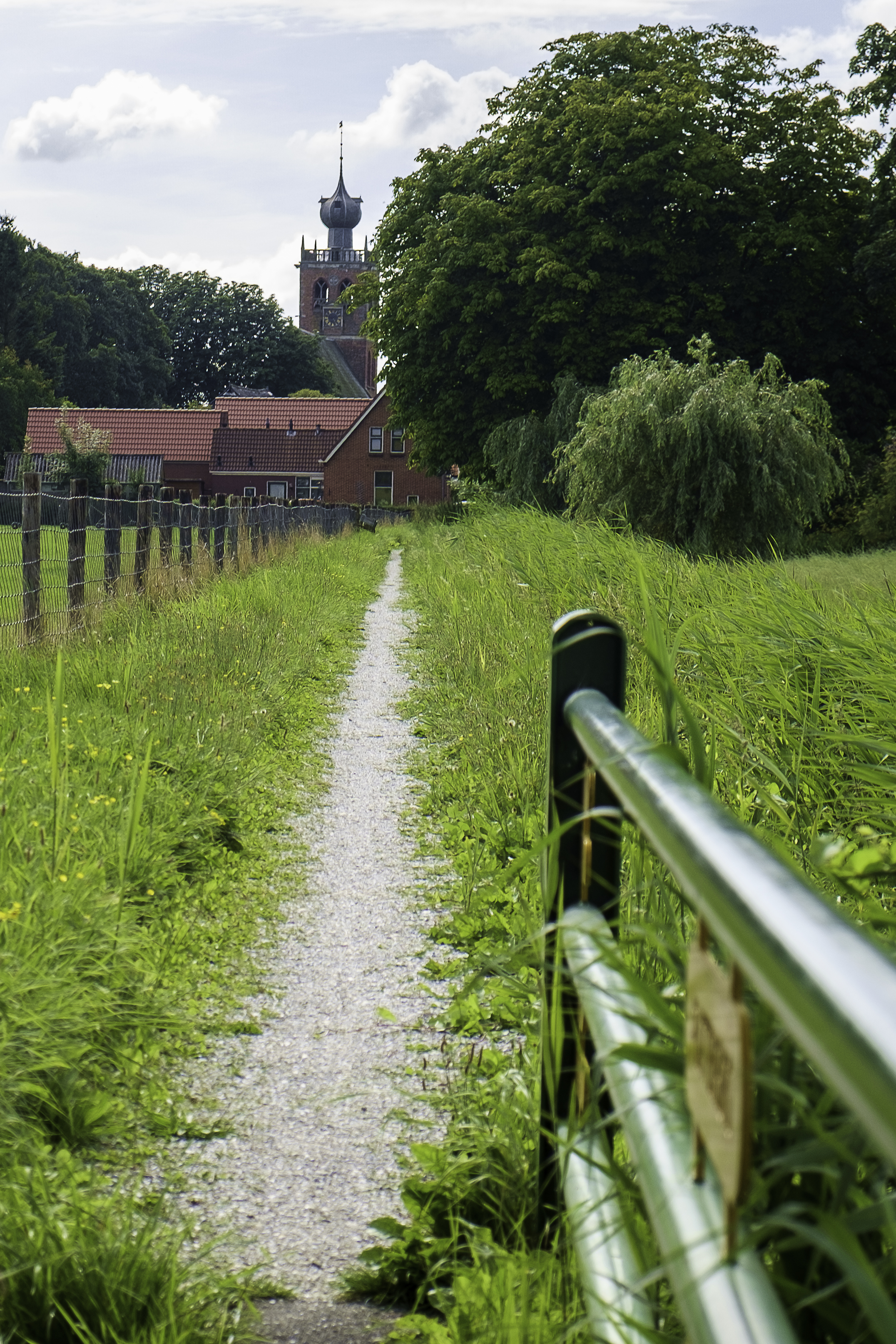
Footpath to Noordwolde

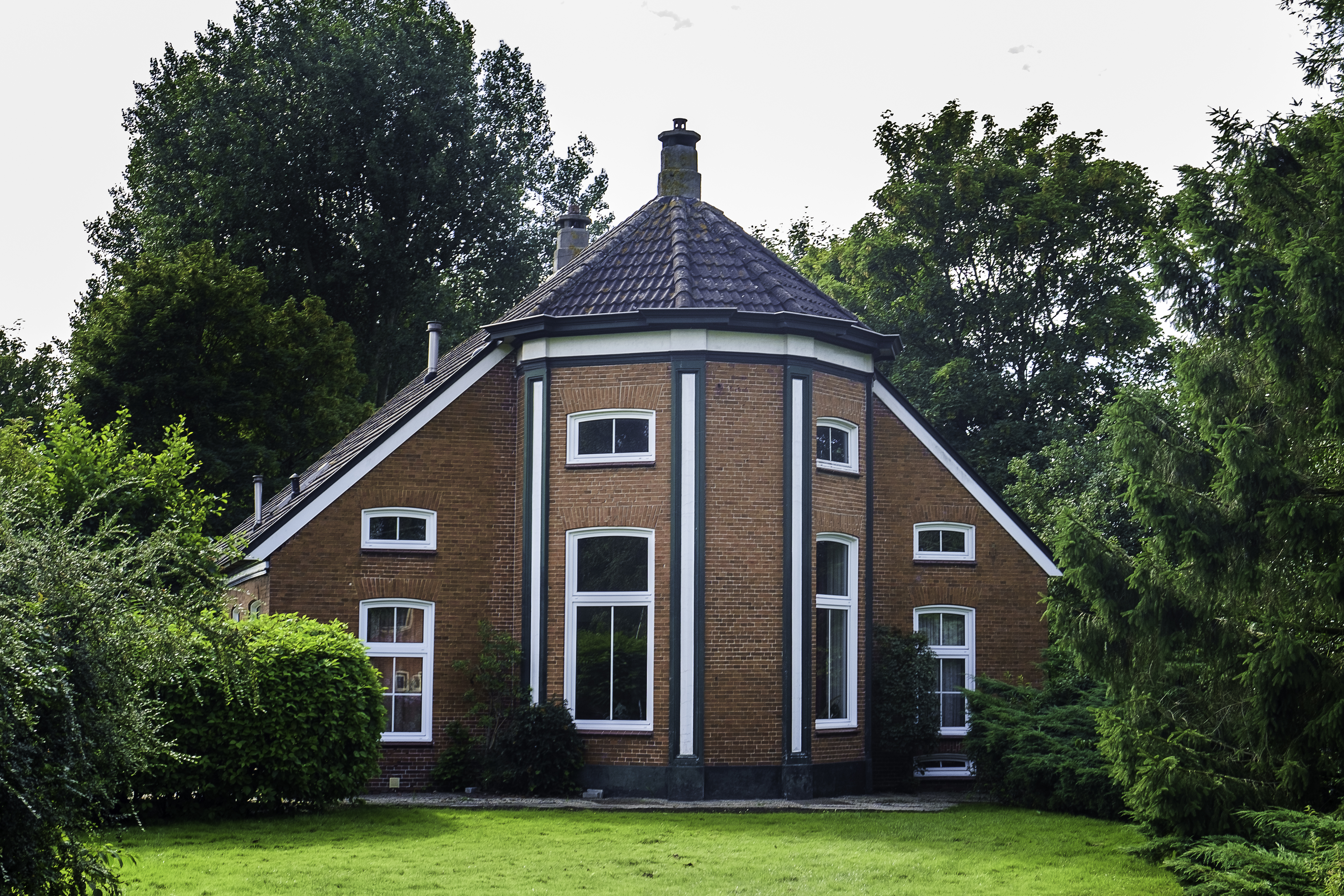
Farm in Noordwolde
