= Van Starkenborgh Canal =

Canal in Groningen, the Netherlands

Coordinates: 53°15′33″N 6°25′45″E

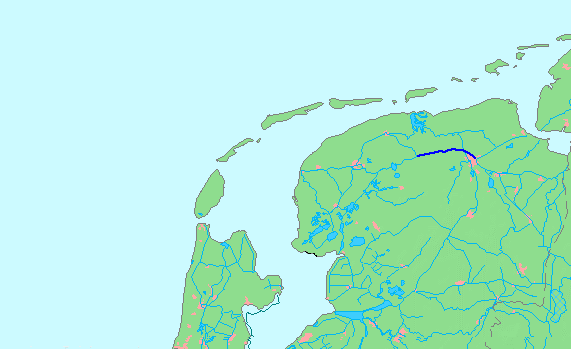
- Interactive map of Van Starkenborgh Canal

Specifications
- Length: 27 km (17 miles)
- Maximum boat length: 135 m
- Maximum boat draft: 3.5 m
- Locks: 2

History
- Date completed: 1 September 1937

Geography
- Start point: Prinses Margriet Canal
- End point: Eems Canal in Groningen

The Van Starkenborgh Canal (Dutch: Van Starkenborghkanaal) is a canal in Groningen that connects the Prinses Margriet Canal with the Eems Canal. The canal is suitable for CEMT-Class Va (barges up to 2,500t), and is part of the Lemmer–Delfzijl Waterway. It is getting upgraded to allow passage to barges with four layers of containers.

The improvement of the waterway between Lemmer and Groningen was above all a political challenge. Planning started in 1900, construction took place from 1922 to 1937. The original Van Starkenborgh Canal was dug between the Eems Canal and Noordhorn and named Van Starkenborgh Canal in 1938. At about the same time, a section of the Hoendiep west of this was upgraded to the same dimensions. In July 1949 this also received the name Van Starkenborgh Canal.

== Trouble on the Hoendiep ==
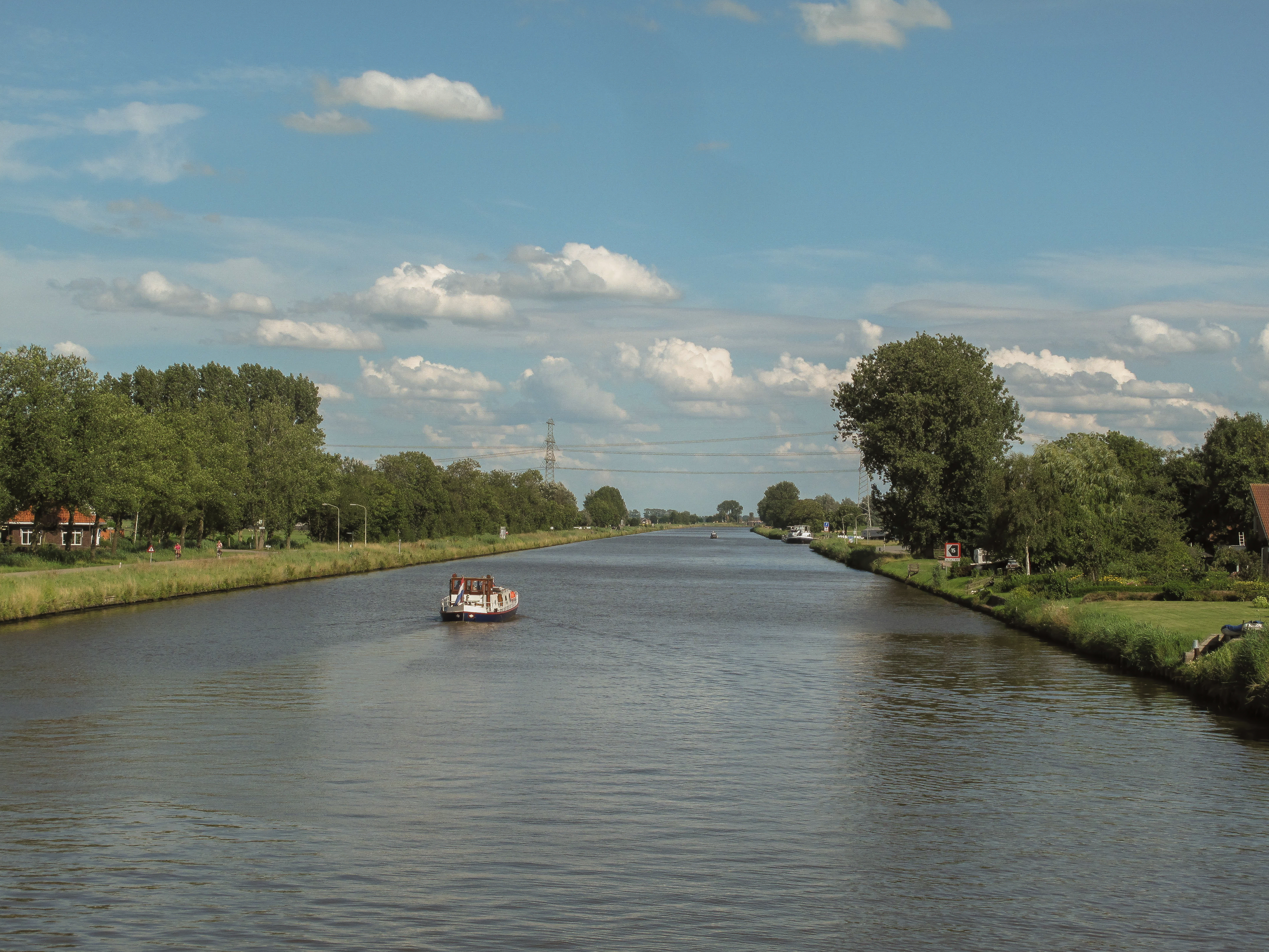
The canal near Aduard

From the mid-17th century the city of Groningen relied on the Hoendiep as its inland waterway to Frisia. This was a small but busy canal. From 1862 to 1870, it was improved. However, the maximum size of the barges on the canal remained only 120-140t.

In 1911, the national government appointed a commission to improve the connection from Groningen to Lemmer. In 1917, this issued a report based on making a canal suitable for barges of 67 by 8.2 by 2.3 m. This would increase the size of the barges on the canal to 600-700t. This plan still called for an improvement of the Hoendiep.

In 1919, the province started preparations to build two new locks to serve this improved Hoendiep. The first lock would replace the existing Gaarkeuken Lock, near the border with Frisia. The other new lock had to replace the Westerhaven Lock.

Construction of Gaarkeuken Lock started in 1922 and was finished in 1924. It was at first planned to be suitable for 700t barges. In the end, this became 1,000t. The reason that authorities went ahead at Gaarkeuken was that they could build the lock in a new side canal. This left enough space to later build a 2,000t lock in the main canal.

The Westerhaven Lock gave the city access to the Hoendiep. The province wanted to spend 950,000 guilders to improve it and make it suitable for 700t barges. However, in the early 1920s, the national government demanded that the design of the new canal would immediately take 1,000t barges into account. This caused that the cost of removing existing buildings and a railway in Groningen and Hoogkerk became so high that an improvement of the existing Hoendiep became unfeasible. The project to upgrade the Westerhaven Lock was then cancelled.

== The failed canal to De Poffert ==
=== The connection between Damsterdiep and Boterdiep ===
1903 plan for city expansion

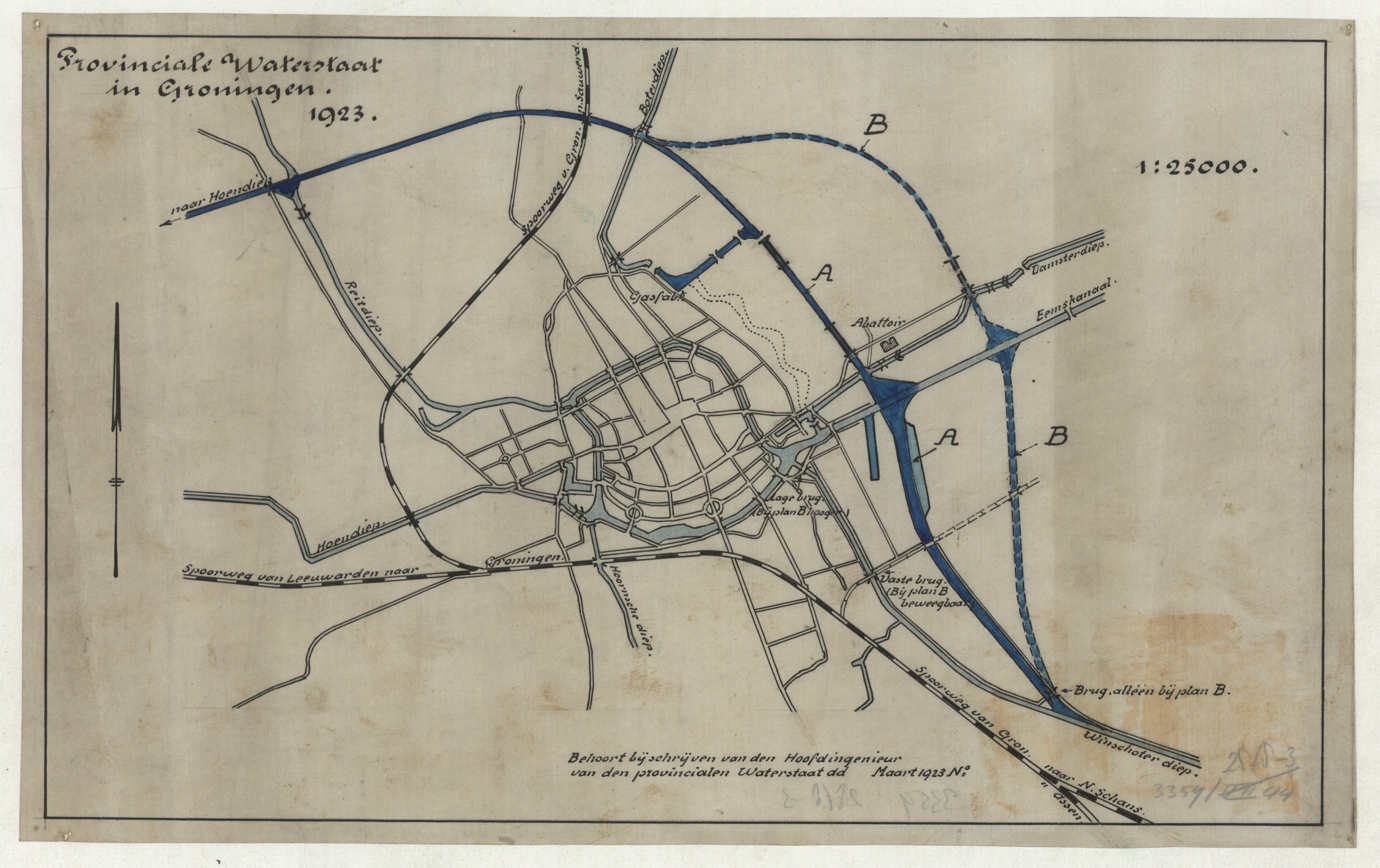
The Gorecht Canal and related plans in 1923

On its eastern side, the city of Groningen faced problems that were very similar to the problems at the Hoendiep. In about 1880, it had made a canal to connect the old Damsterdiep in the east to the Boterdiep that went to the north. This was called the Verbindingskanaal Damsterdiep-Boterdiep and was dug along the old fortification moats. See the map of the 1903 plan for city expansion.

By 1919, a new connection canal between the Damsterdiep and Boterdiep was under construction. It was called the Gorecht Canal, in Dutch also spelled as 'Gorechtkanaal' or 'Goorecht Kanaal'. On the 1903 map, it is shown as a part of a much longer canal that would make a direct connection between the Winschoterdiep and the Boterdiep, and that was labelled as 'Ontworpen Kanaal'.

=== The Omsnijdingskanaal to De Poffert ===
The very high cost of upgrading the Westerhaven Lock and widening the Hoendiep near Hoogkerk, made that authorities looked for a plan that evaded these problems. The Omsnijdingskanaal plan was created based on the existence of the Gorecht Canal. The idea was to extend the Gorecht Canal and then 'cut around' (omsnijden) the north side of the city of Groningen and connect to the Hoendiep at De Poffert, just west of Hoogkerk.

The 1923 map shows this proposed canal turning back south after crossing the Groningen–Delfzijl railway. The big plus of this plan was that it did not require a new Westerhaven Lock and did not require a costly compulsory purchase and demolishment of buildings in Hoogkerk. It would basically mean a detour north of the city, but it would evade the choke points. The province and national government supported this plan. The new plan would cost about 3,750,000 guilders, of which 2,500,000 would be paid by the national government.

The local chamber of commerce opposed the plan. It said that it was useless as long as Frisia did not act to improve its part of the waterway. However, it also said that if the other authorities wanted to persist, it would be better not to use the Gorecht Canal, but to construct the new canal about 750 m further to the east. This would allow the construction of a new lock at a place between the Damsterdiep and the Eems Canal. See the 1923 map.

== Construction of the Van Starkenborgh Canal ==
The current Van Starkenborgh Canal consists of two parts. The original Van Starkenborg Canal was named as such on 15 December 1937. The section of the Hoendiep from Noordhornerga to the Frisian border was renamed Van Starkenborg Canal on 26 July 1949.

=== The original Van Starkenborgh Canal ===
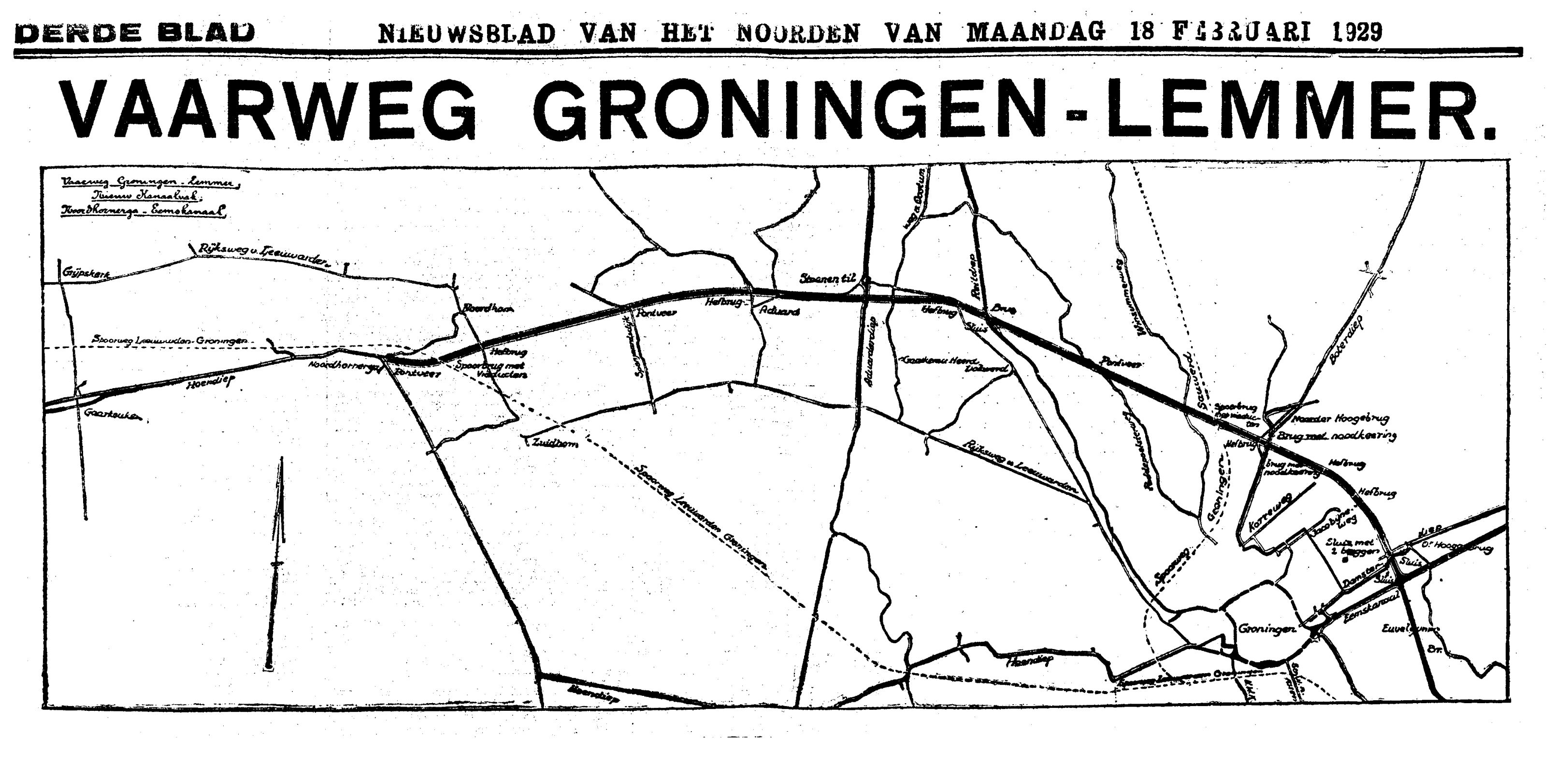
1929 plan of the original Van Starkenborgh Canal

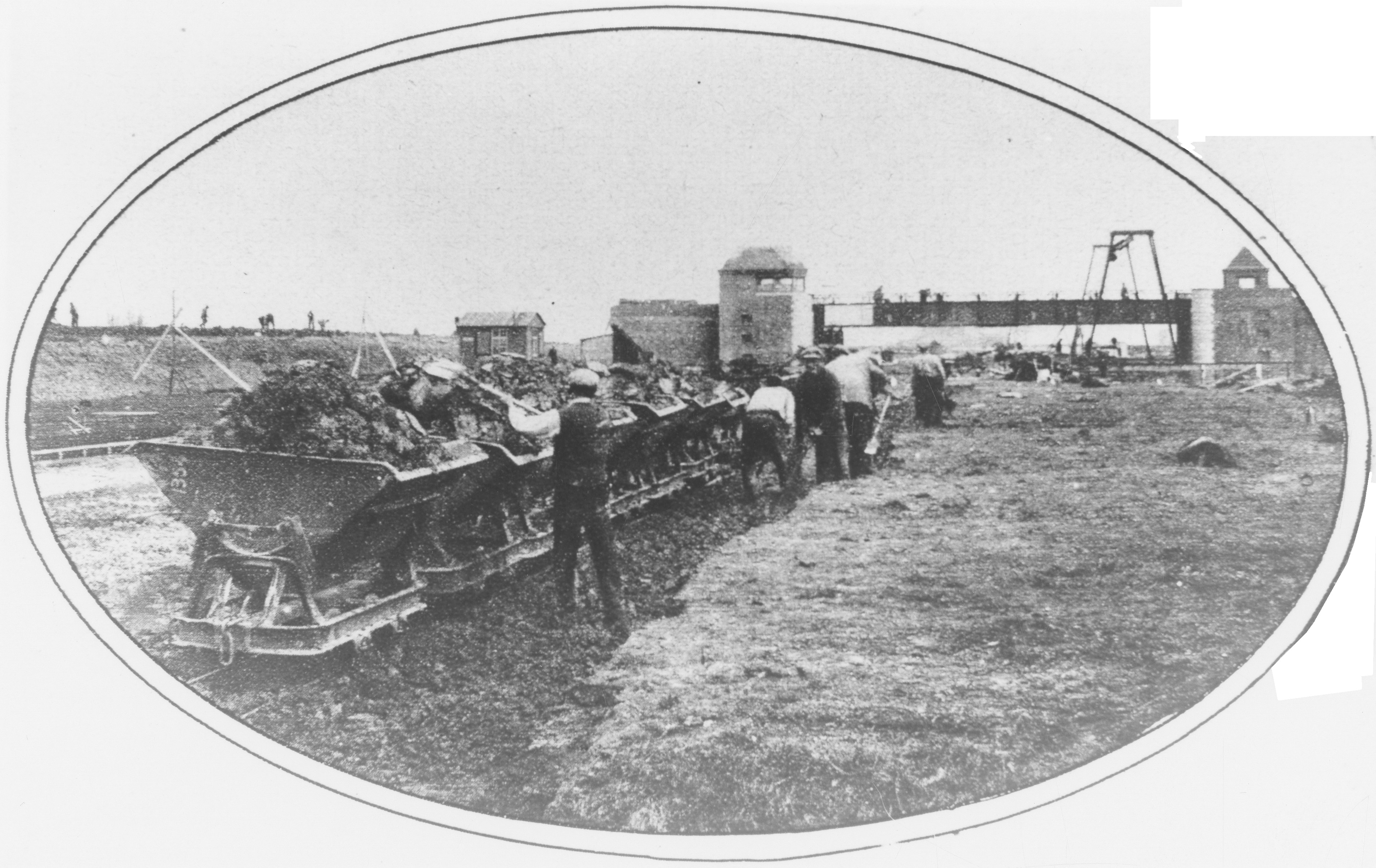
Construction near Dorkwerd in about 1931

By early 1926, the plans for the omsnijdingskanaal had changed. The new canal would now go directly from the Eems Canal to the northern part of the Hoendiep near Noordhorn or more specifically: Noordhornerga. This would bypass most of the Hoendiep. The result would be a canal that followed a slightly bent line from Gaarkeuken to the Eems Canal just east of the city. The idea still included using the Gorecht Canal. The province relegated a decision about this to the national government.

In November 1927, the national government decided that the new canal should follow the route suggested by the Chamber of Commerce and connect to the Eems Canal somewhat further to the east. This design was for barges of 1,000t, or 80 by 9.2 by 2.4 m. The plan had to take expansion to 2,000t barges into account.

The decisions about who should pay for the improved canal might have been as complex as the technical aspects of the canal. In general, the national government had to pay for projects that were in the national interest, and local government had to pay for projects that were in the local interest. The new waterway was of national and local interest. In Groningen, this was complicated by the municipality of Groningen being so dominant in the province. In early 1929, the national government promised to bear two-thirds of the cost for the section between the Eems Canal and Noordhorn, and all of the costs for acquiring the terrains for this section. Groningen province and the municipality of Groningen city then had to agree about who would bear the rest.

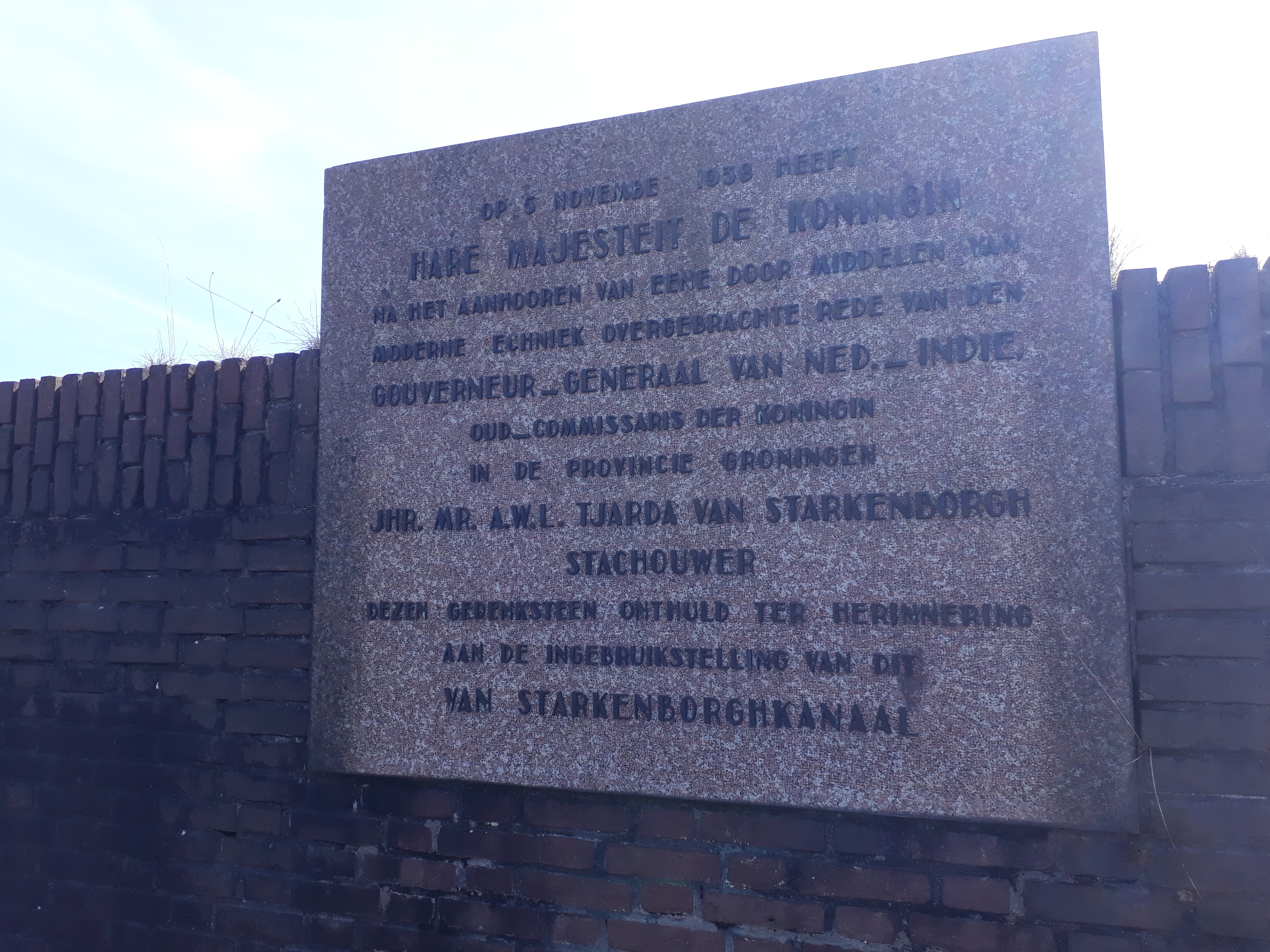
Commemorative plaque

The national government and the local authorities in Groningen agreed about constructing the original Van Starkenborgh Canal before there was an agreement with Friesland about improving the whole waterway between Lemmer and Groningen. In February 1929 the provincial assembly decided to give its approval for the construction between Noordhornerga and the Eems Canal. By 1930, the original Van Starkenborgh Canal was under construction. In early 1934 authorities started to use unemployed people to dig the canal by hand, the so-called werkverschaffing. On 15 October 1936, the section between Noordhornerga and the vertical lift bridge near the Boterdiep was opened for shipping. The section between the Boterdiep and the Eems canal was opened for shipping on 1 September 1937. On 5 November 1938 the whole was christened as Van Starkenborg Canal by Queen Wilhemina. She revealed a Commemorative plaque and A.T. van Starkenborgh Stachouwer, Governor-General of the Dutch East Indies, made a speech by radio that was broadcast during the ceremony.

=== Construction west of Noordhorn ===
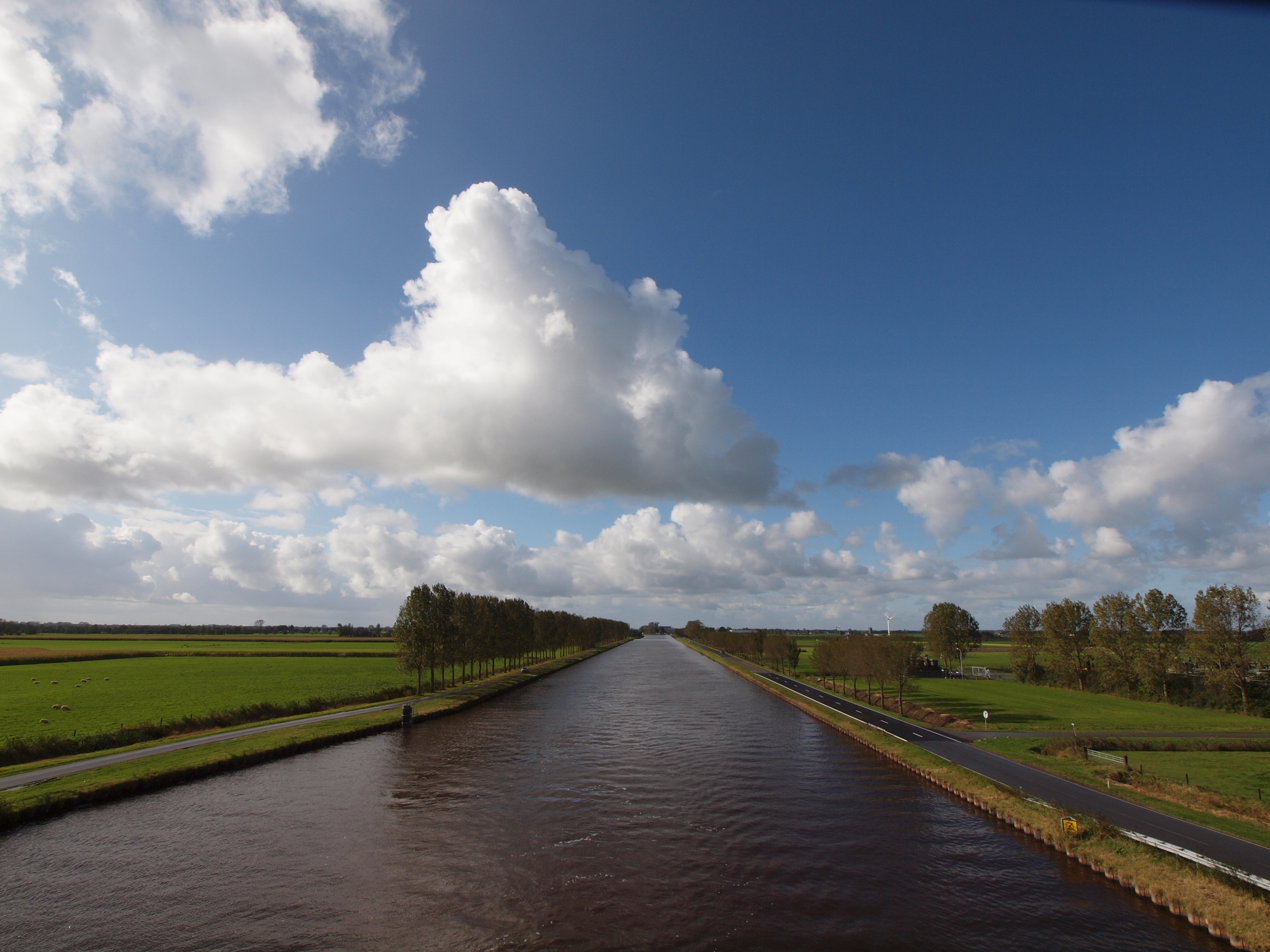
Near Eibersburen view towards Stroobos

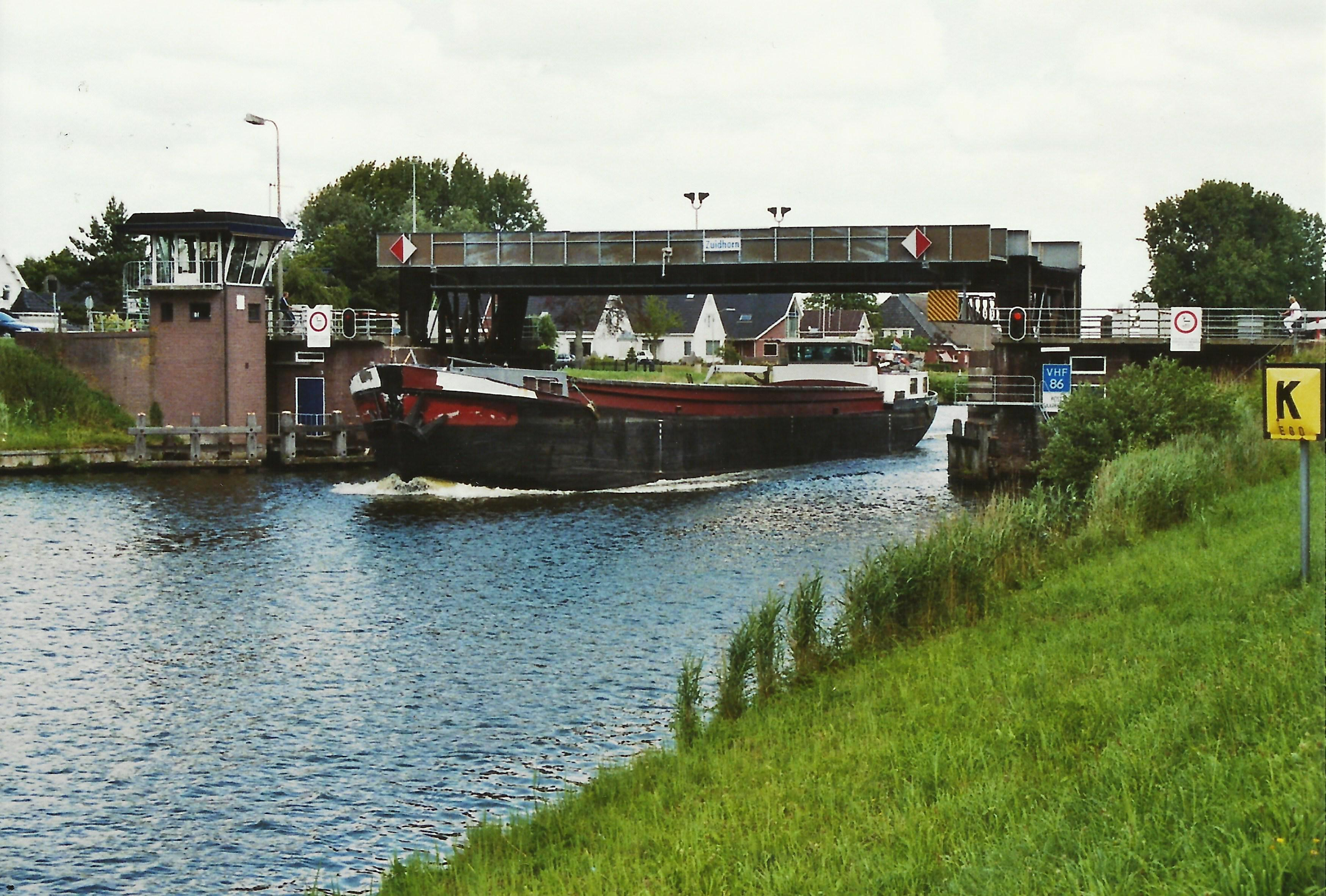
Vertical lift bridge at Zuidhorn, 2012

The original Van Starkenborgh Canal was useful for inland shipping between Groningen and Lemmer because it evaded the Hoendiep. However, the investment to construct a canal of these dimensions only made sense if the whole Gronigen-Lemmer waterway was improved. For Friesland, the improved Groningen-Lemmer waterway would have limited value. There were almost no significant Frisian places along its trajectory. What was even worse, was that the national government wanted to limit toll on the canal. The toll on the existing waterway to Groningen formed a significant part of the provincial budget.

In November 1929, engineers of the local and national governments issued a plan for the part of the Groningen-Zuiderzee waterway west of Noordhornerga. To compensate Friesland, this included an upgrade and improvement of the waterway from Harlingen via Leeuwarden to Fonejacht, the later van Harinxmakanaal. In July 1931, Groningen province agreed to the national government's proposal for the cost. The national government would bear all of the compulsory purchase cost and the extra cost for going to Stavoren instead of Lemmer. Of the construction cost, Groningen would have to pay one-third of the cost for the section between Noordhorn and the provincial border. For the section to Stavoren, Groningen would pay 4/15 and Friesland 1/15. For the Van Harinxma canal, Groningen would pay 1/15 and Friesland 4/15 of the construction cost. The rest of the construction cost, i.e. 2/3 was paid by the national government. Groningen province meanwhile also agreed with the municipality about a further division of the cost.

It took three more years before Friesland province finally agreed. Friesland required that construction of the later Van Harinxma Canal would be started and finished at the same time as the section to Stavoren. It also wanted to collect toll on the new canals. However, toll was not collected on canals in the center and south of the country and not on national waterways. The primary concern of Friesland was that if the canal to Stavoren was completed before the canal between Harlingen and Leeuwarden, trade would shift from Harlingen to other harbors and not come back. It was February 1934 before Friesland agreed in principle. The official approval by the province came in July 1934.

Meanwhile, Groningen went ahead with its part of the plan. In December 1932, the House of representatives received a proposal for a disappropriation law for the section between Noordhornerga and Stroobos on the Frisian border. By late 1934, the section between Noordhornerga and Gaarkeuken Lock was under construction. In 1935, 1,300 unemployed were used to dig, mainly in this section. On 16 November 1936 the section on both sides of the bridge at Eibersburen was opened for shipping. In July 1937, all work in Groningen province was complete.

=== As built ===
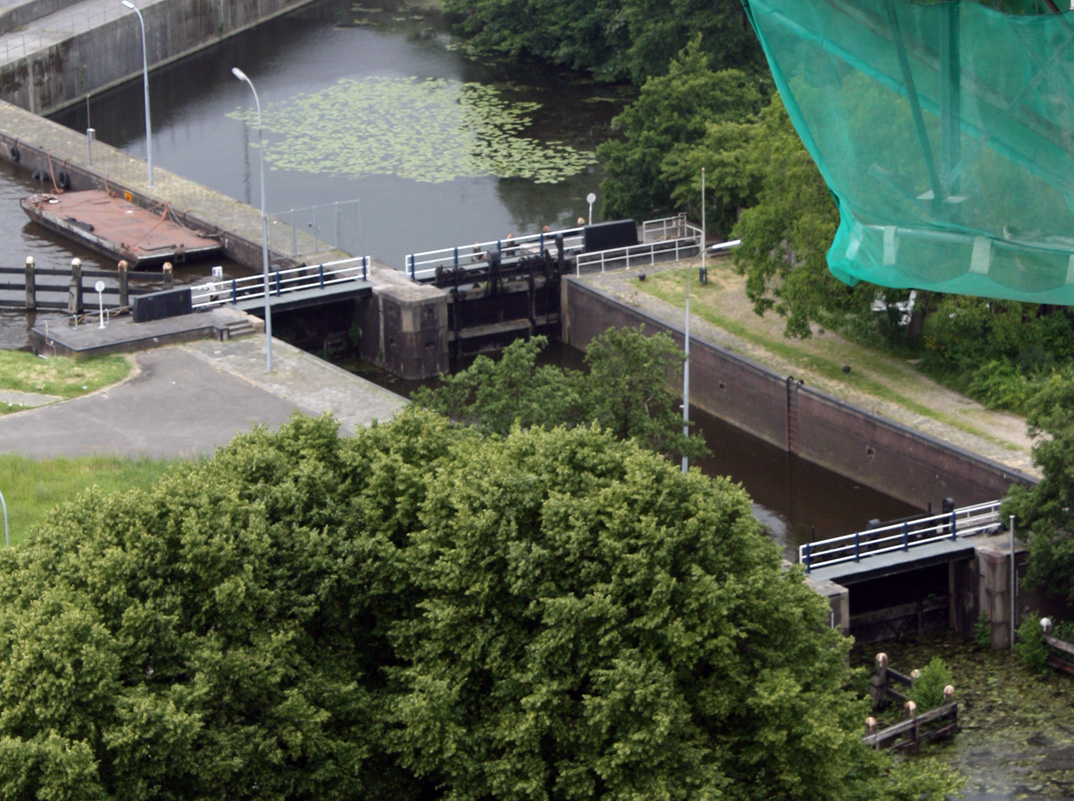
Damsterdiep three-way lock

As built, the original canal had to be suitable voor 1,000t barges. These would be 80 by 9.2 by 2.4 m, with a height above the water of 4.75 m. At the canal level, the canal would have a depth of 3 m. The bottom would be 20 m wide and the canal would be 42 m wide at the water level. The section between Noordhornerga and Strobos was also suitable for 1,000t barges.

Gaarkeuken Lock was 190 m long and 12 m wide. It had gates that were 10 m wide and 3 m deep. At the junction with the Eems Canal, there was another lock, the Oostersluis. This was planned to get the same dimensions. The only difference would be a lower sill on the Eems Canal. However, when the Oostersluis was opened, it was said to be 188 m long with gates of 12 m. This seems a mistake, but is explained by the use of gates (roldeuren) that rolled into position, making the gate as wide as the lock chamber itself.

There were smaller locks at Dorkwerd and on the Damsterdiep. The lock on the Damsterdiep was a three-way lock.

The choices that were made for the bridges reflect the motorization of inland shipping. At the time, railway bridges were a headache for inland navigation. Therefore, the design opted for two fixed railway bridges that were wide enough and high (7 m) enough to let 2,000t motor barges through. For road traffic, these high bridges would be problematic. The plan therefore opted for seven vertical-lift bridges that allowed barges of up to 4 m high to pass without opening the bridge. There were also three small pontoon swing bridges. The bridge at Eibersburen near the Frisian border, was a bascule bridge.

== Use and expansion ==
=== Initial success, the 1,000t canal ===
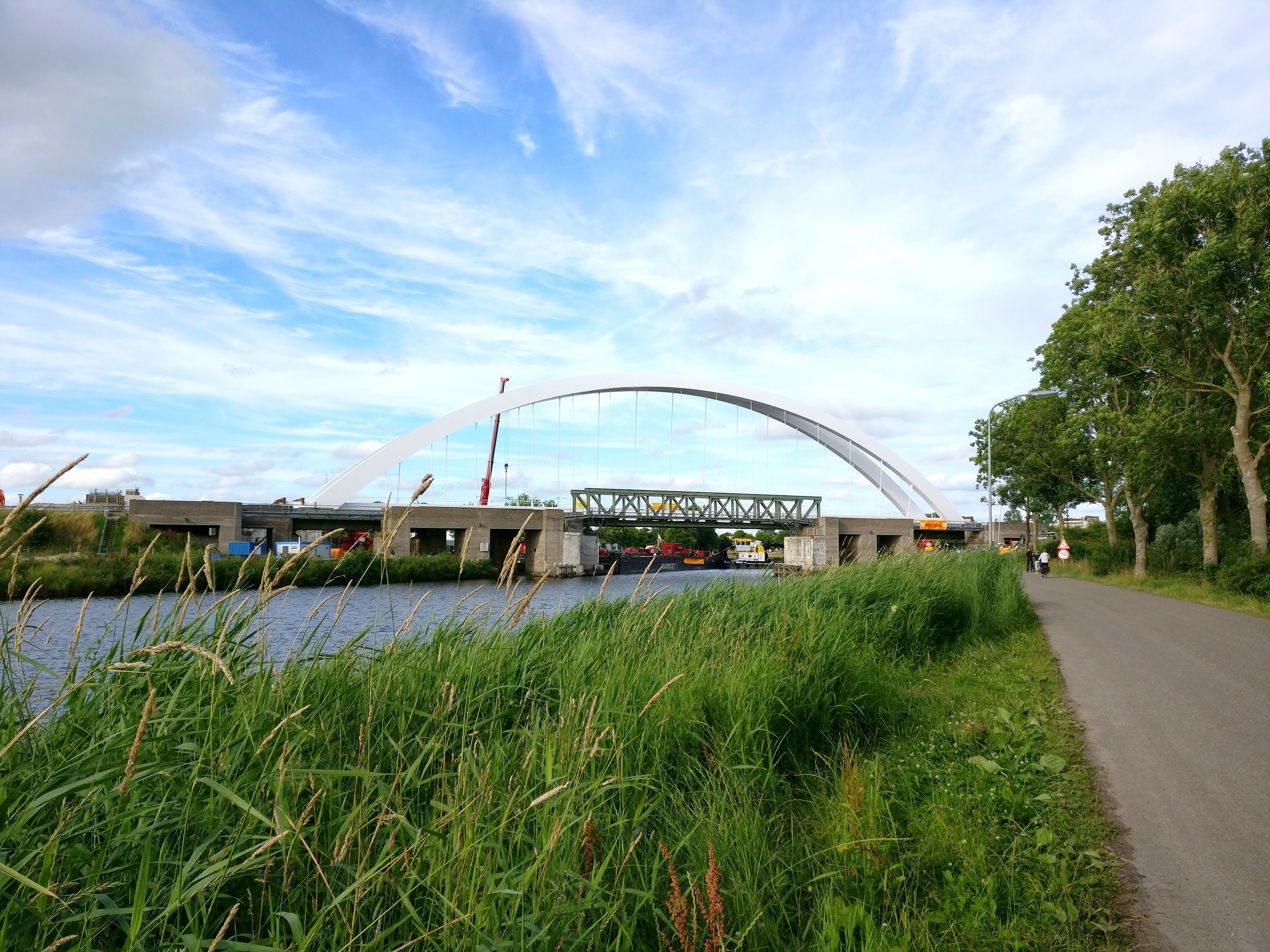
Old and new Railway bridges at Zuidhorn

In November 1937, the Oostersluis was passed by 971 barges of 66,424t. These numbers implied that the original canal was a success, even without the works on the Frisian side. Indeed, the numbers of the Westerhaven Lock on the old route confirmed this. In 1937, the Westerhaven lock was used by 17,015 barges measuring 1,053,539t. In 1938, this was 10,267 barges measuring 776,209t.

At first, the size of the barges using the canal remained small, 66,424t / 971 = only about 70t. However, even before the Frisian side of the canal was opened, the average size of barges at the Oostersluis increased. In 1948 15,277 barges measuring 1,592,565t passed the lock, which gives an average size of 105t. After the opening of the Frisian part of the Lemmer–Delfzijl Waterway in 1951, the size of the barges on the canal increased rapidly. In 1960 24,329 vessels measuring 6,213,497t passed the Oostersluis, giving an average size of 255t.

For Gaarkeuken Lock, numbers were similar. In 1929, 1,963,000t passed Gaarkeuken. In 1952 this was 2,860,000t. In 1962, it was 8,950,000t and in 1964 almost 11,000,000t. Meanwhile, the average size of barges increased from 68t in 1929 to 131t in 1952 and 318t in 1962.

=== Upgrade to 1,350t (1963-1980) ===
In 1963 a project was started to make the canal suitable for barges of up to 1,350t (CEMT class IV). That year, work started to construct a new southern bank of the canal. The canal would get a depth of 3.55 m. The bottom would become 24 m wide. In effect, the works aimed to make the canal suitable for barges of up to 2,000t, but for the time being, Gaarkeuken Lock would limit this to 1,350t.

Gaarkeuken Lock was the oldest object on the canal. It had now become its biggest obstacle because its gates were only 10 m wide. This limited the barges on the canal to a beam of about 9.5 m, which was typical for the 1,350t type. In 1976 construction of the new Gaarkeuken Lock started. It was also 190 m long, but had gates of 16 m width. The depth at the gates was 5.20 m below the canal level, or 5.70 m below N.A.P. The new would operate quicker. It was opened in June 1980.

=== Upgrade to 2,000t, the Oostersluis (1980-1996) ===
After June 1980, the Oostersluis became the canal's biggest problem. The average size of barges at the Oostersluis continued to increase. In 1965, it was still below 400t. In 1975 it was 624t. In 1985 760t and in 1986, it reached 857t. Meanwhile, the canal itself slowly degraded, not in the least because the bigger barges and their powerful engines damaged it. This was also true for the Oostersluis. Its gates narrowed from 12.20 to 11.72 m and became shallower.

In about 1990, Groningen decided to construct a new Oostersluis. I would be capable to handle 2,000t barges and would have to be sufficient until at least 2010. It would be 190 m long and 16 m wide. The lock chamber would be made of concrete and the gates themselves of steel. The time to put a ship through would decrease from 90 minutes to 30 minutes. Actual construction started in 1992. The new Oostersluis was finished in 1996.

=== Upgrade to 2,500t and container shipping ===
In 1996 Rijkswaterstaat and the provinces of Groningen and Friesland decided that the Lemmer-Delfzijl Waterway should be made suitable for CEMT class Va ships. That is barges of 110 by 11.4 m with a maximum draft of 3.5 m. Meanwhile, Containerization set in and opened a whole new market for inland navigation. It made that bridge span clearance became more important. Therefore, the upgrade to CEMT class Va came to include a plan to make passage possible for barges with four layers of containers.

=== Coastal shipping ===
A peculiarity of the Van Starkenborgh Canal is that it was also used by coasters. These are small but seaworthy vessels. These could e.g. pick up cargo in the Baltic and then reach the canal via the Eems Canal. In November 1937, the Oostersluis was passed by 29 coasters of 5,991 m^{3}. In 1967 coasters totalling 300,000t passed Gaarkeuken Lock.

== Current characteristics ==
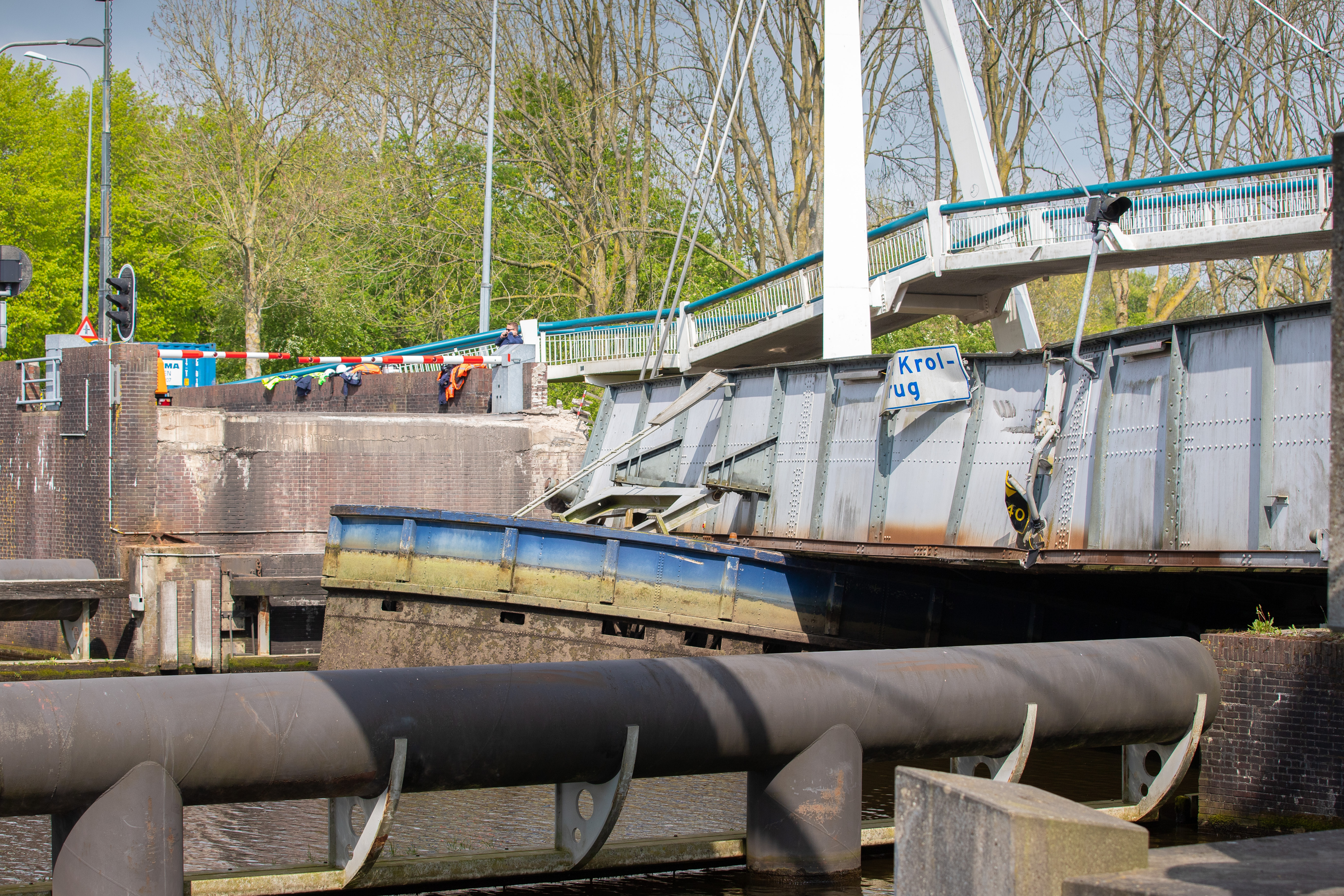
The destroyed Gerrit Krol bridge in 2021

Since 1 January 2014, the ownership, management, and maintenance of the canal are in the hands of Rijkswaterstaat, i.e. the national government. The current (2025) plans focus on making the canal suitable for barges transporting four layers of containers.

The first bridge that was upgraded to facilitate four-layer container barges was the railway bridge on the Groningen–Delfzijl railway. In the early 2000s, this was almost end of life and the railways wanted to double the track. The new railway bridge got a horizontal passage of 54 m. The clearance became about 9 m, making it possible to pass below it with four layers of containers. The other railway bridge, the one at Zuidhorn was upgraded in 2017. It is now 54 m wide with a normal clearance of 9.74 m.

In May 2025, the situation of the other bridges was as follows: The fixed part of the bascule bridge in Eibersburen was 44.4 m wide with a clearance of 9.96 m. The Gaarkeuken Lock had a 16.03 m wide movable bridge. The movable road bridge in Zuidhorn was 53.82 m wide with a clearance of 9.76 m when open. The fixed bridge in the N355 is 37.04 m wide with a clearance of 9.74 m. The vertical lift bridge at Aduard is 53.94 m wide with a clearance of 9.83 m when open. The vertical lift bridge at Dorkwerd is 53.94 m wide with a clearance of 9.87 m when open. The fixed Noordzee bridge in the N370 is 43.62 m wide with a clearance of 9.88 m. The Gerrit Krol brug on the Korreweg was destroyed by a collision in 2021. Its undamaged bicycle bridges are 21.8 m and 22.10 m wide with a clearance of 7.14 m. The bus bridge on the Oosterhamrik route consists of a 18.7 m wide bascule bridge and a 20.0 m wide fixed bridge with a clearance of 6.83 m. The Oostersluis has two 16 m wide bascule bridges.

In November 2018, the national government reserved 162 million euros to upgrade the three remaining narrow bridges in Groningen city: A new Gerrit Krol Bridge would be made; The Paddepoel Bridge that had been destroyed by collision in September 2018 might be replaced; and the bus bridge would be replaced. The new Gerrit Krol Bridge will be a higher vertical lift bridge with higher fixed auxiliary bicycle bridges. It is planned to be taken into use in 2029. A new (bicycle only) Paddepoel Bridge will be ready in 2027.
