= Boterdiep =

Canal in Groningen

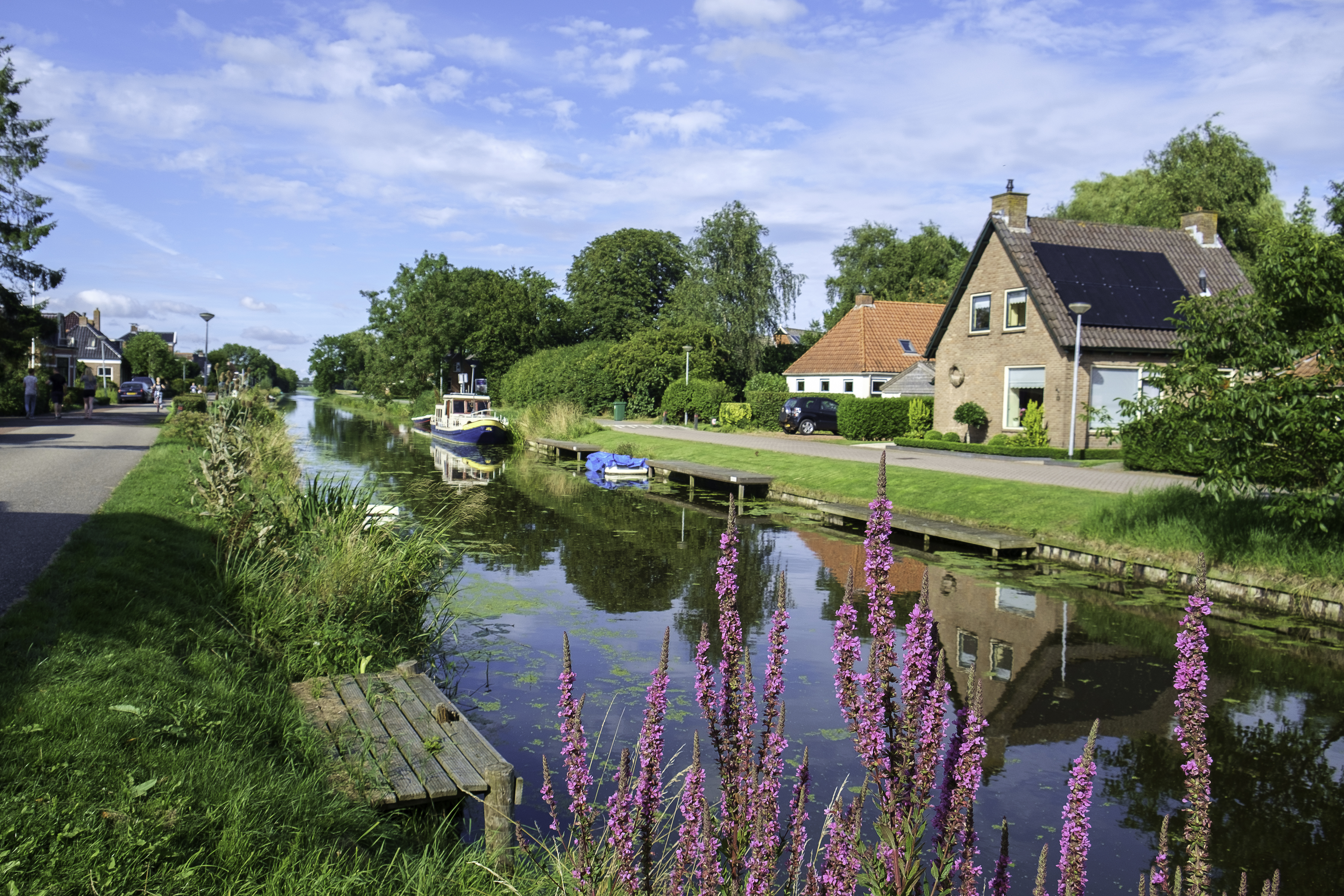
- Boterdiep at Zuidwolde

Location
- Country: Netherlands
- Province: Groningen

Physical characteristics
- Source
  - location: Van Starkenborgh Canal
  - coordinates: 53.23863°N 6.56834°E
- Mouth: Uithuizen
  - coordinates: 53.40592°N 6.67658°E
- Length: 25 kilometres (16 mi)

Boterdiep (Gronings: Botterdaip; translation: Butter Deep) is a canal in the Province of Groningen in the Netherlands. It was intended for the inland navigation. The name relates to the dairy products transported through the canal. It used to have its source in the centre of Groningen, but it has been rerouted to the Van Starkenborgh Canal.

== History ==
In the 15th century, the Cleisloot provided a connection to Bedum north of the city of Groningen. In 1625, the ditch was transformed into a canal which resulted in Zuidwolde being cut into two parts. In 1653, the Boterdiep was extended to Onderdendam In 1660, it was extended to Kantens, and reached Uithuizen in 1695 where it ended in a little harbour.

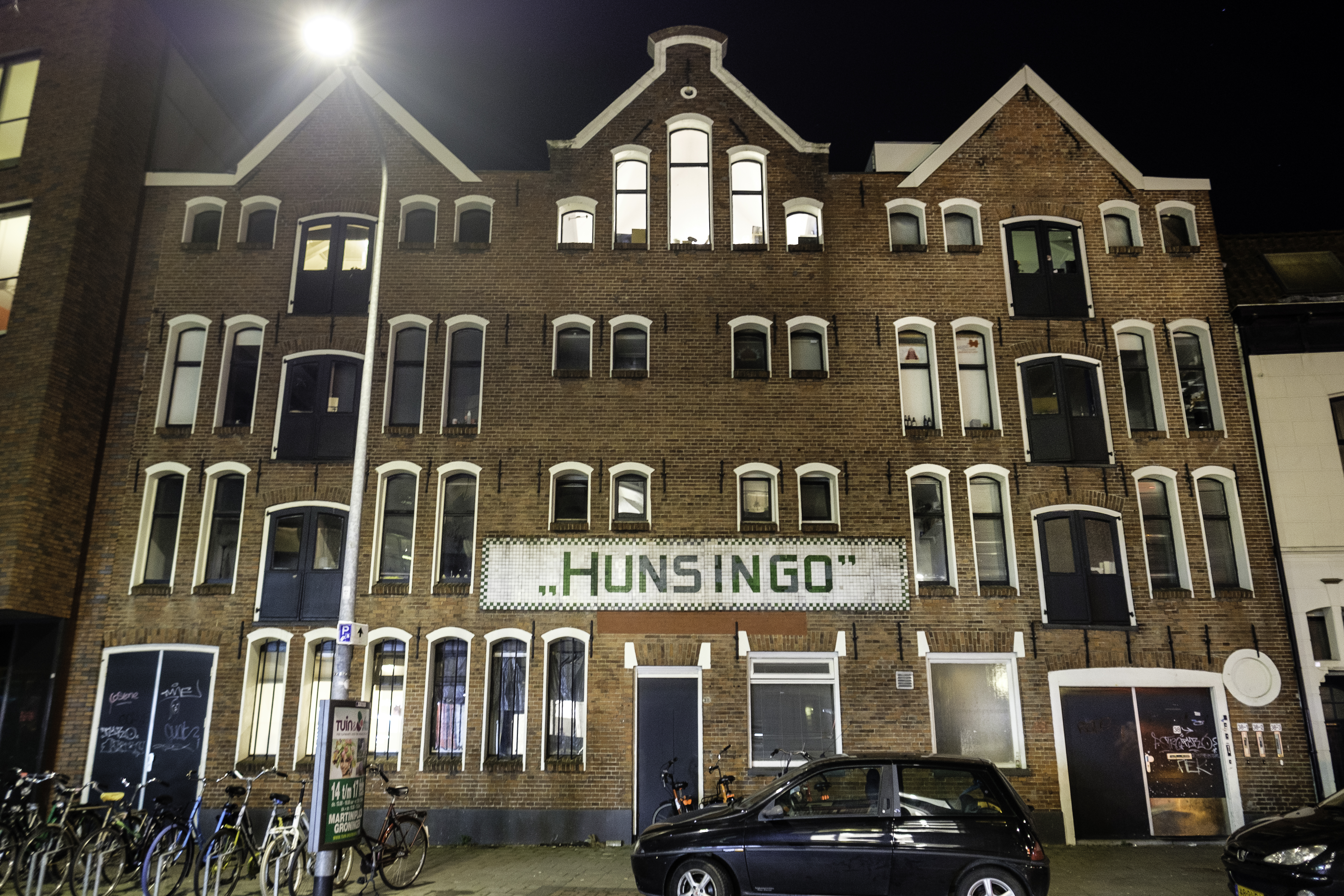
Warehouses along the Gedempte Boterdiep

From the 17th century until the beginning of the 20th century, the Boterdiep was a main inland canal, and was aligned on either side by towpaths. The canal used to begin at the Turfsingel in the centre of Groningen. In the early 20th century, the Van Starkenborgh Canal was dug, and in 1912, the Boterdiep was re-routed to the new canal.

The section in Groningen was filled up and was renamed Gedempte Boterdiep. In 1973, another 700 metres was filled up to allow for the construction of a road to Eemshaven. The canal did not agree and two months later, after heavy rain, had managed to return. The Boterdiep is nowadays mainly used for recreational boating and a 6 km/h speed limit applies. In 2020, the towpaths were reconstructed as a cycle and pedestrian tracks.
