= Zuidwolde, Groningen =

Zuidwolde
- Village
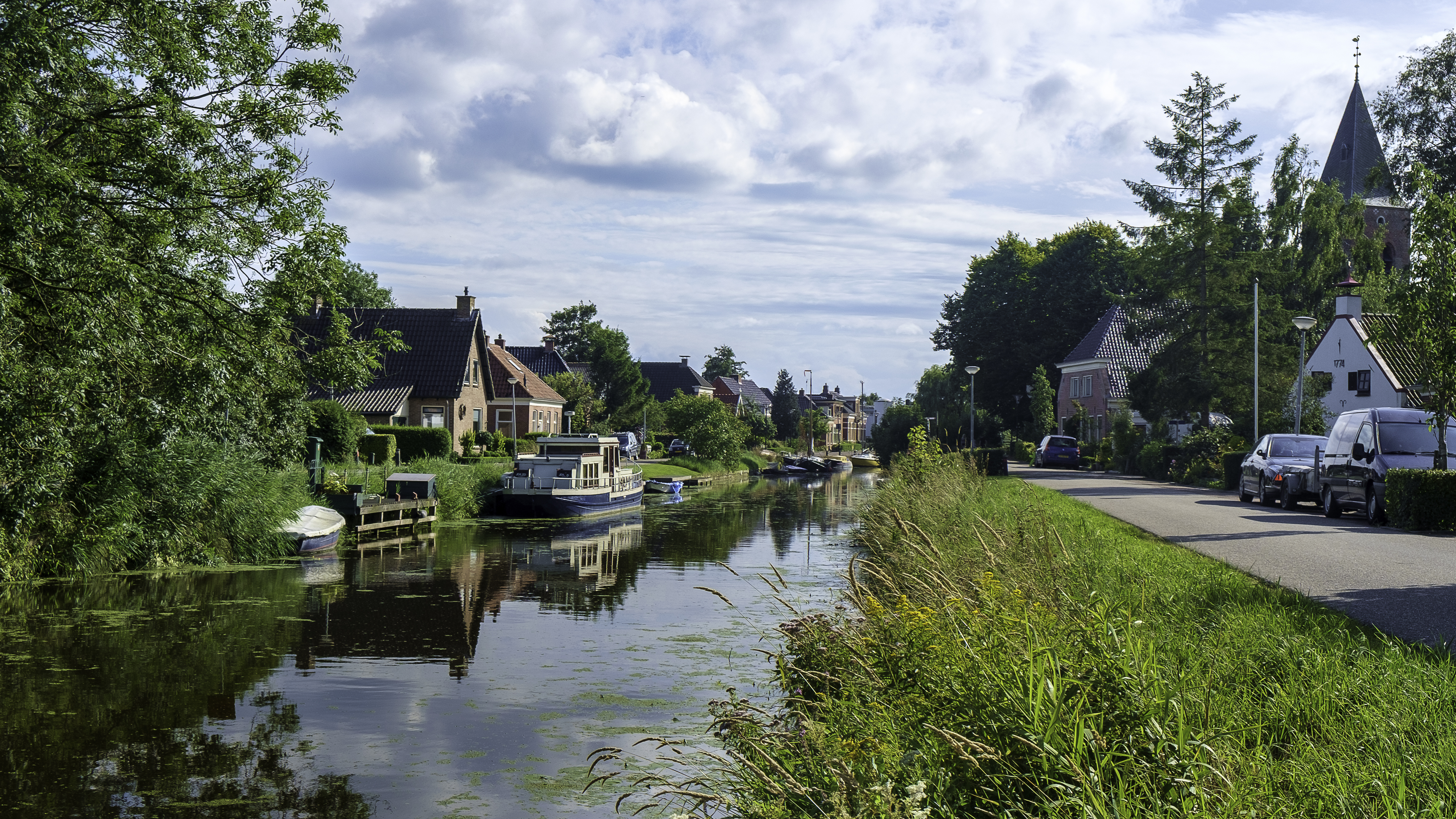
- Zuidwolde at Boterdiep

- Location in the province of Groningen in the Netherlands Zuidwolde (Netherlands)
- Country: Netherlands
- Province: Groningen
- Municipality: Het Hogeland

Area
  - Total: 7.73 km^{2} (2.98 sq mi)
- Elevation: −0.1 m (−0.33 ft)

Population (2021)
  - Total: 1,020
  - Density: 132/km^{2} (342/sq mi)
- Time zone: UTC+1 (CET)
  - Summer (DST): UTC+2 (CEST)
- Postal code: 9785
- Dialing code: 050

Zuidwolde (Dutch pronunciation: [zœytˈʋɔldə]; Gronings: Zuudwòl [zyːtˈʋɔːl]) is a village in Het Hogeland municipality in the province of Groningen, the Netherlands. It had a population of around 1,010 in January 2017.

== History ==
The village was first mentioned in 1399 as "up Zuytwolde", and means "southern woods". Zuidwolde developed in the middle ages in a forest rich moorland. It was initially build on small house terps (artificial living hills), but developed into a linear settlement with two churches: Zuidwolde and Noordwolde. In 1653, the Boterdiep was dug cutting the village into two parts.

The tower of the Dutch Reformed church dates from the 12th century and was enlarged around 1638. The church has 13th century elements, but was altered several times during its history. In 1854, it was shortened slightly in order to widen the road.

Zuidwolde was home to 425 people in 1840. During the 20th century, Zuidwolde became a commuter's village of the city of Groningen.

== Gallery ==
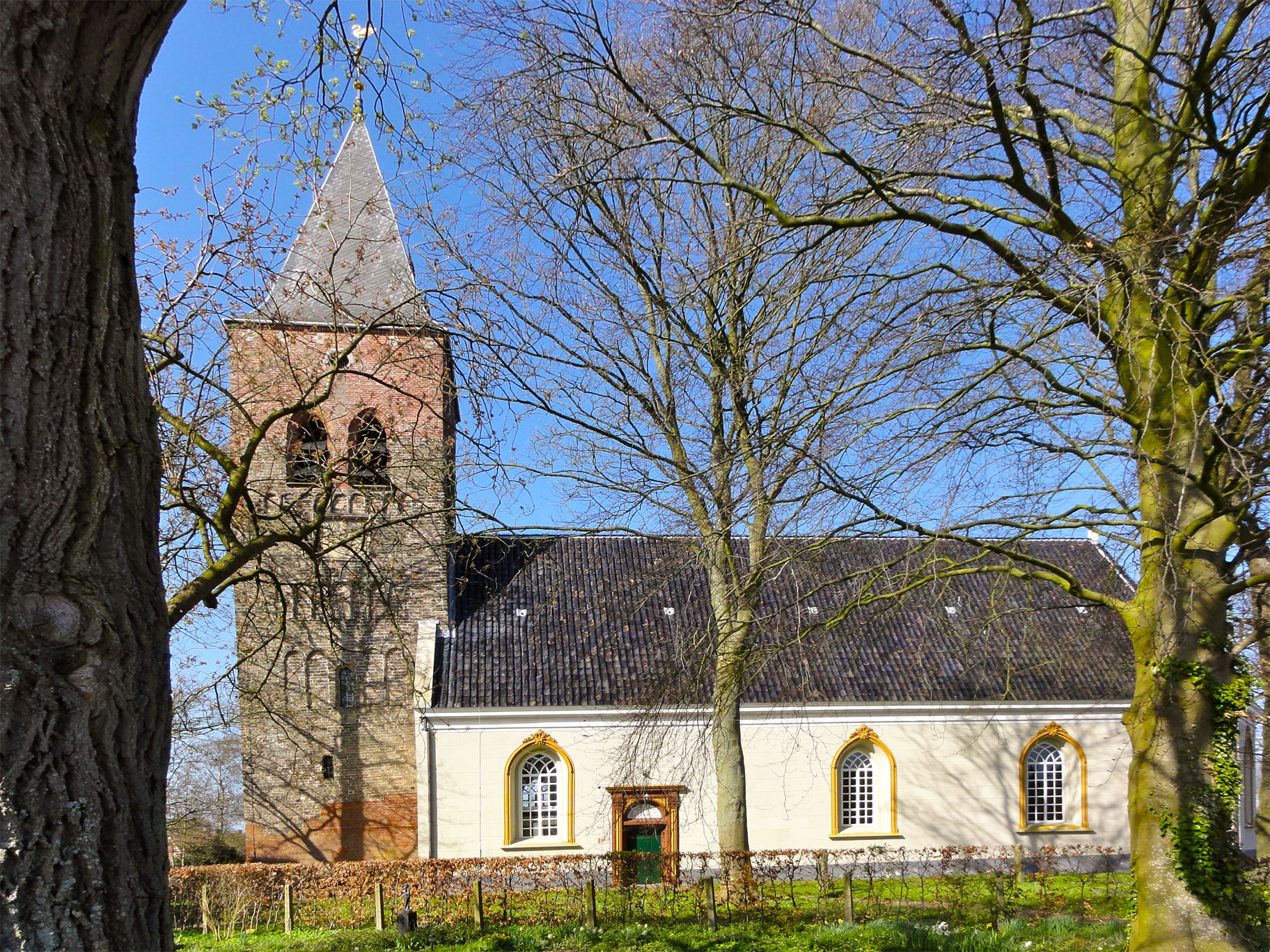
Church of Zuidwolde

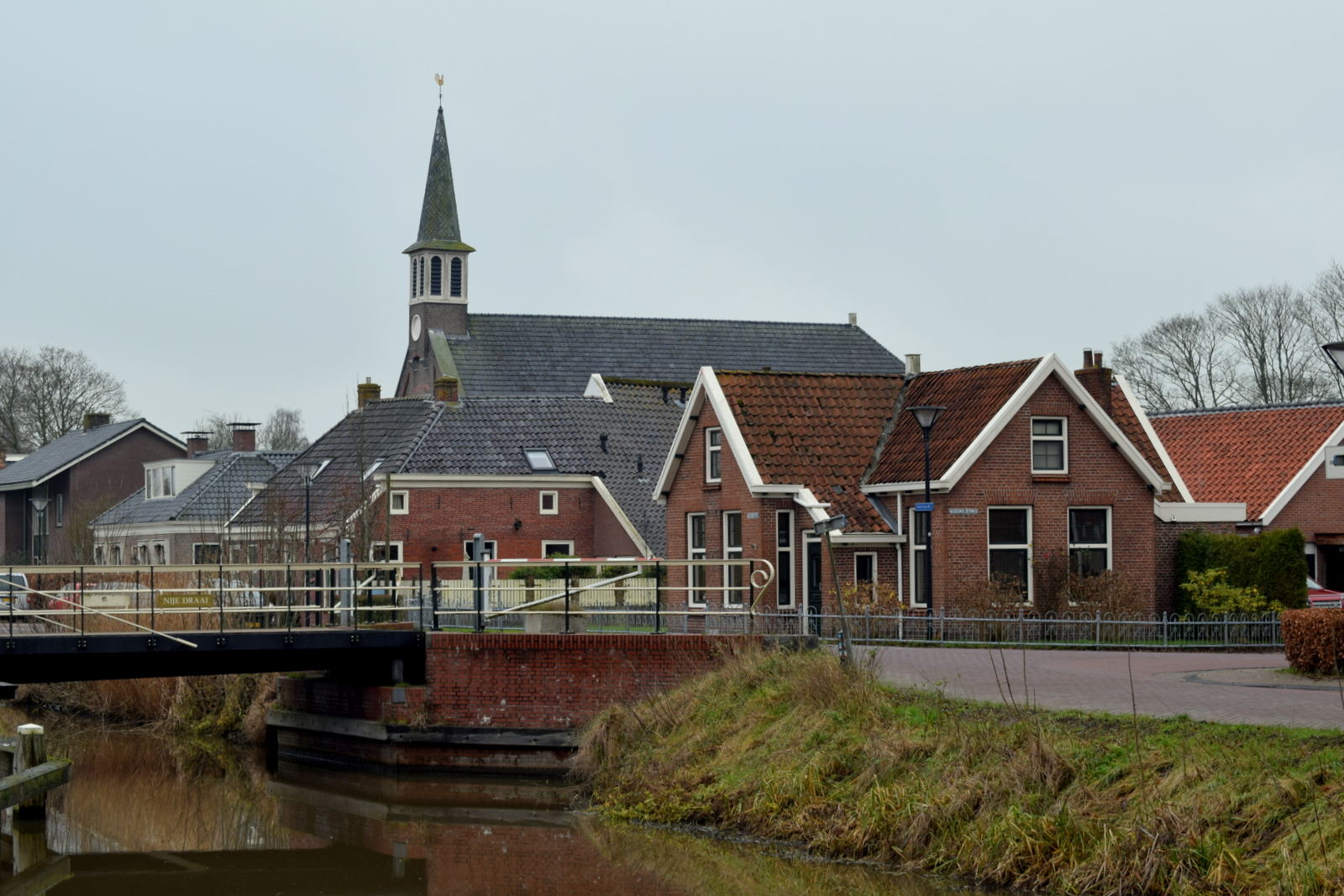
View on Zuidwolde

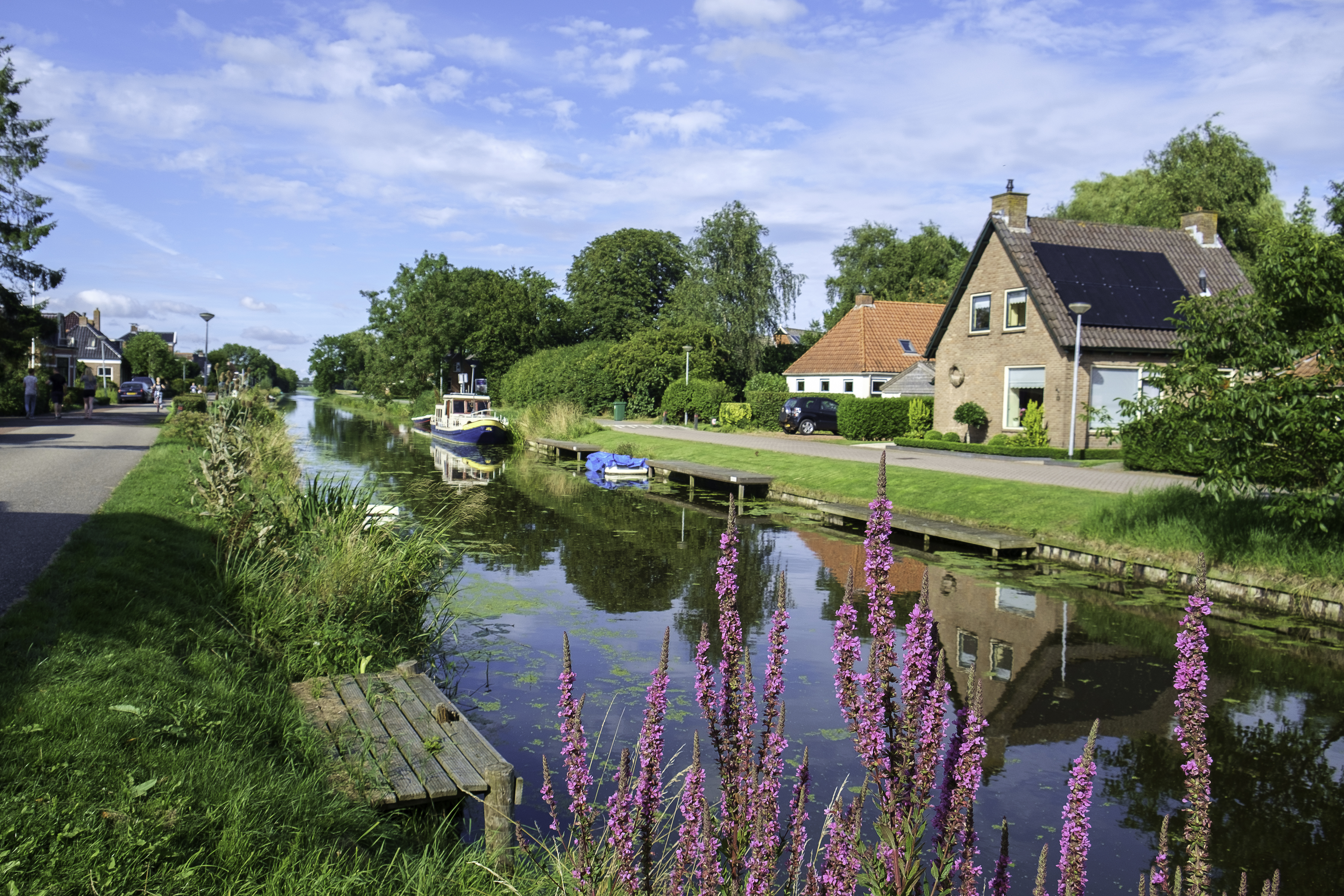
Boterdiep in Zuidwolde

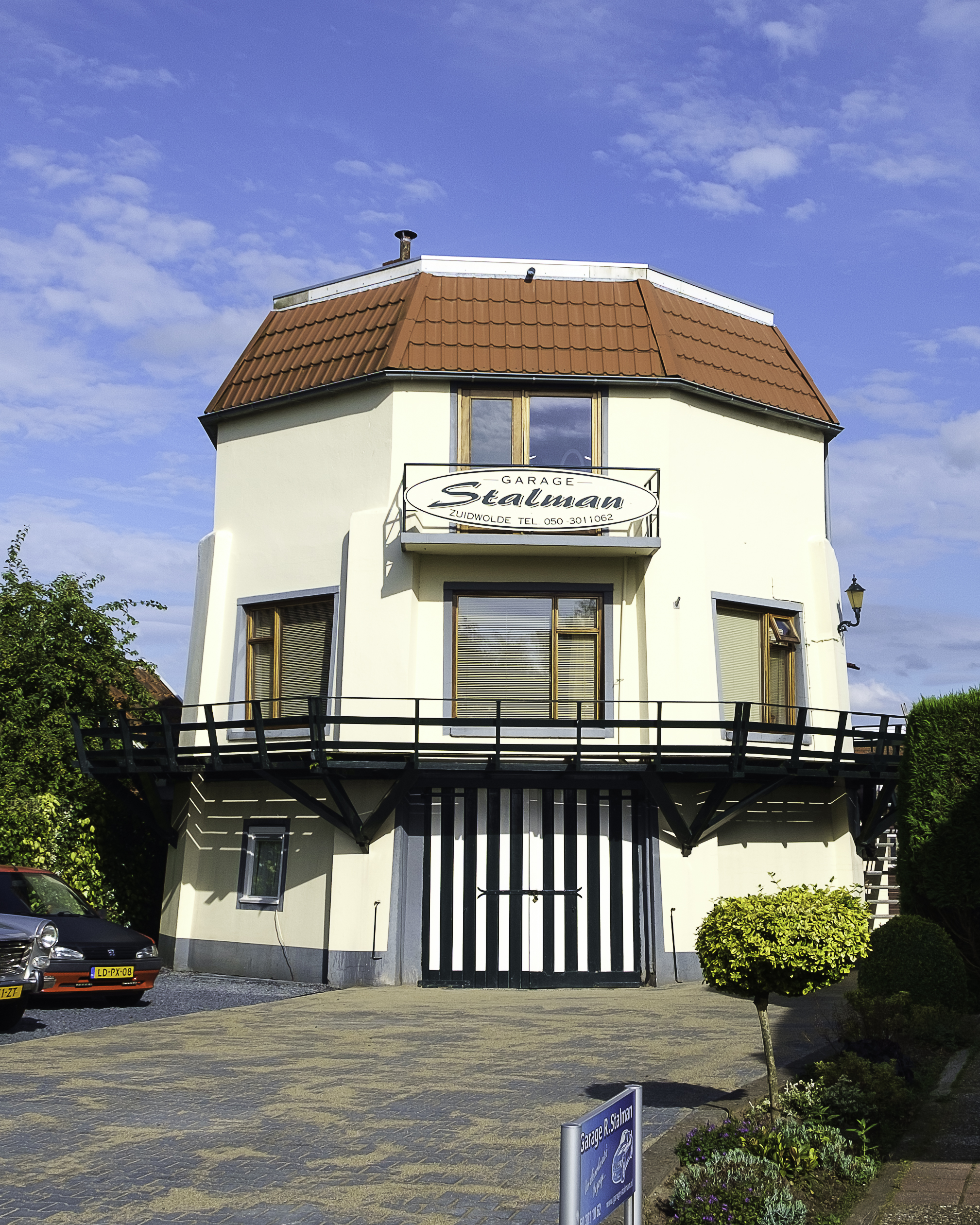
Former wind mill turned auto repair shop
