= Augustinusga =

Augustinusga Stynsgea (West Frisian)
- Village
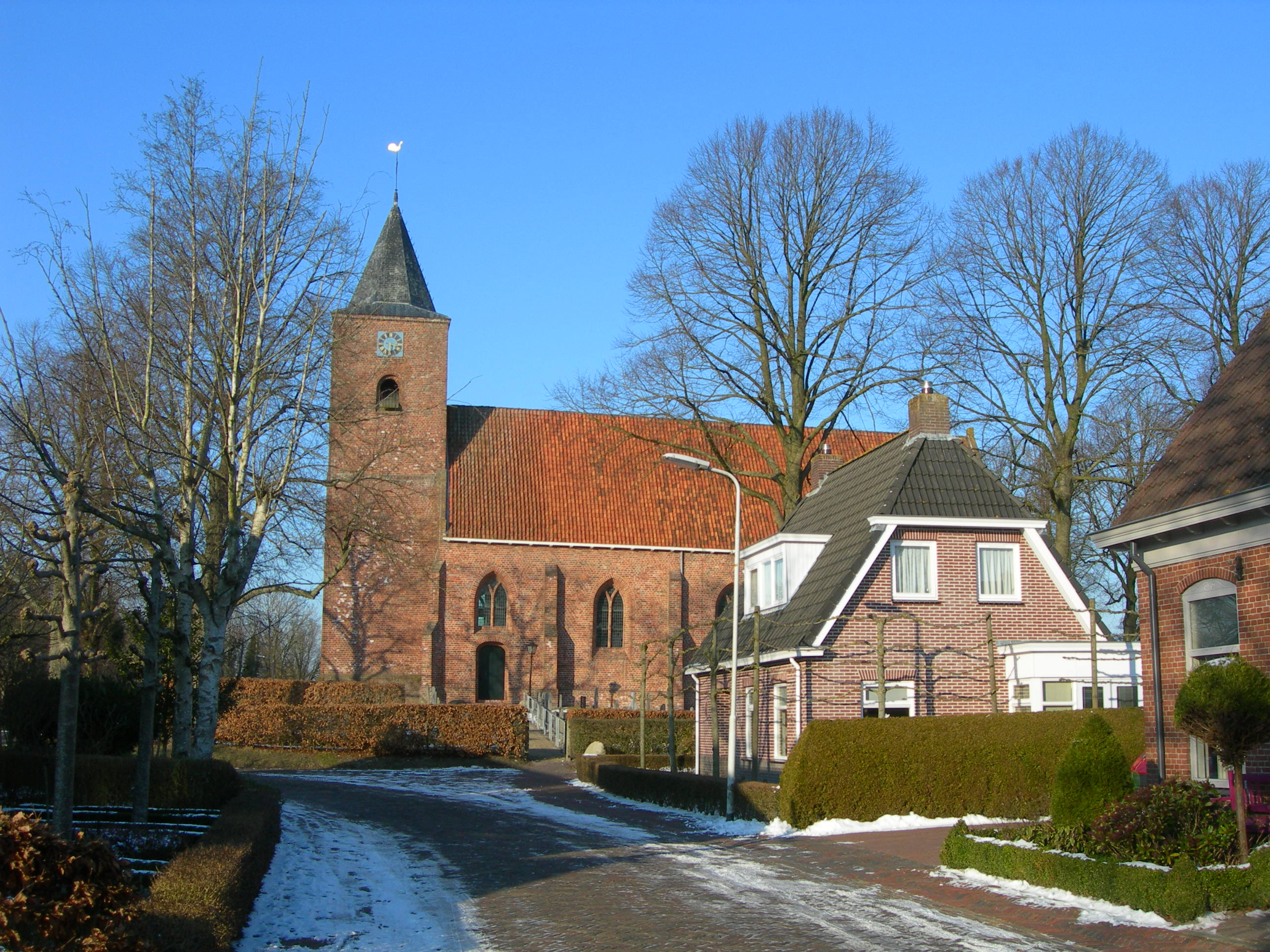
- Augustine Church

- Flag Coat of arms

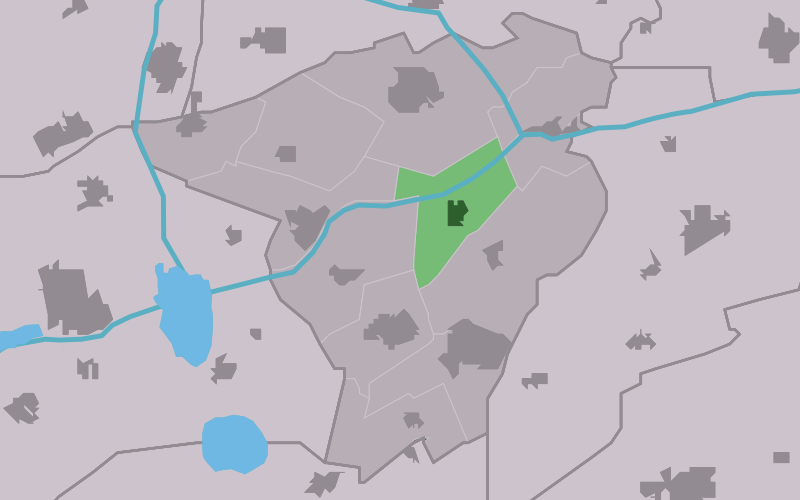
- Location in Achtkarspelen municipality

- Location in the Netherlands Augustinusga (Netherlands)
- Country: Netherlands
- Province: Friesland
- Municipality: Achtkarspelen

Area
  - Total: 7.51 km^{2} (2.90 sq mi)
- Elevation: 1 m (3.3 ft)

Population (2021)
  - Total: 1,200
  - Density: 160/km^{2} (410/sq mi)
- Time zone: UTC+1 (CET)
  - Summer (DST): UTC+2 (CEST)
- Postal code: 9284
- Dialing code: 0512

Augustinusga (West Frisian: Stynsgea) is a village in the municipality of Achtkarspelen, Friesland province, The Netherlands.

Augustinusga lies in the eastern part of the province of Friesland, 10 km north of Drachten. As of 2017, it had a population of 1233.

== History ==
The village was first mentioned around 1240 as "parrochia beati Augustini", and means "village of Augustine of Hippo". Augustinusga is a road village which developed on the intersection of the roads from Buitenpost to Drachten and Surhuizum. In 1240, Gerke Harkema from Augustinusga founded the village of Gerkesklooster. In 1242, Huwe Harkema, his brother, founded Buweklooster.

The Protestant church of Augustinusga was built in the 15th century and has a 13th-century tower which is slightly detached from the church. The poldermolen is a tjasker, simple pumping mill, which was originally located in Blessum and moved to Augustinusga in 1972. In 1840, it was home to 600 people. In 1897, a dairy factory was opened which resulted in further development. The factory closed in 1968.

== Notable buildings ==
- The Protestant church of Augustinusga

== Gallery ==
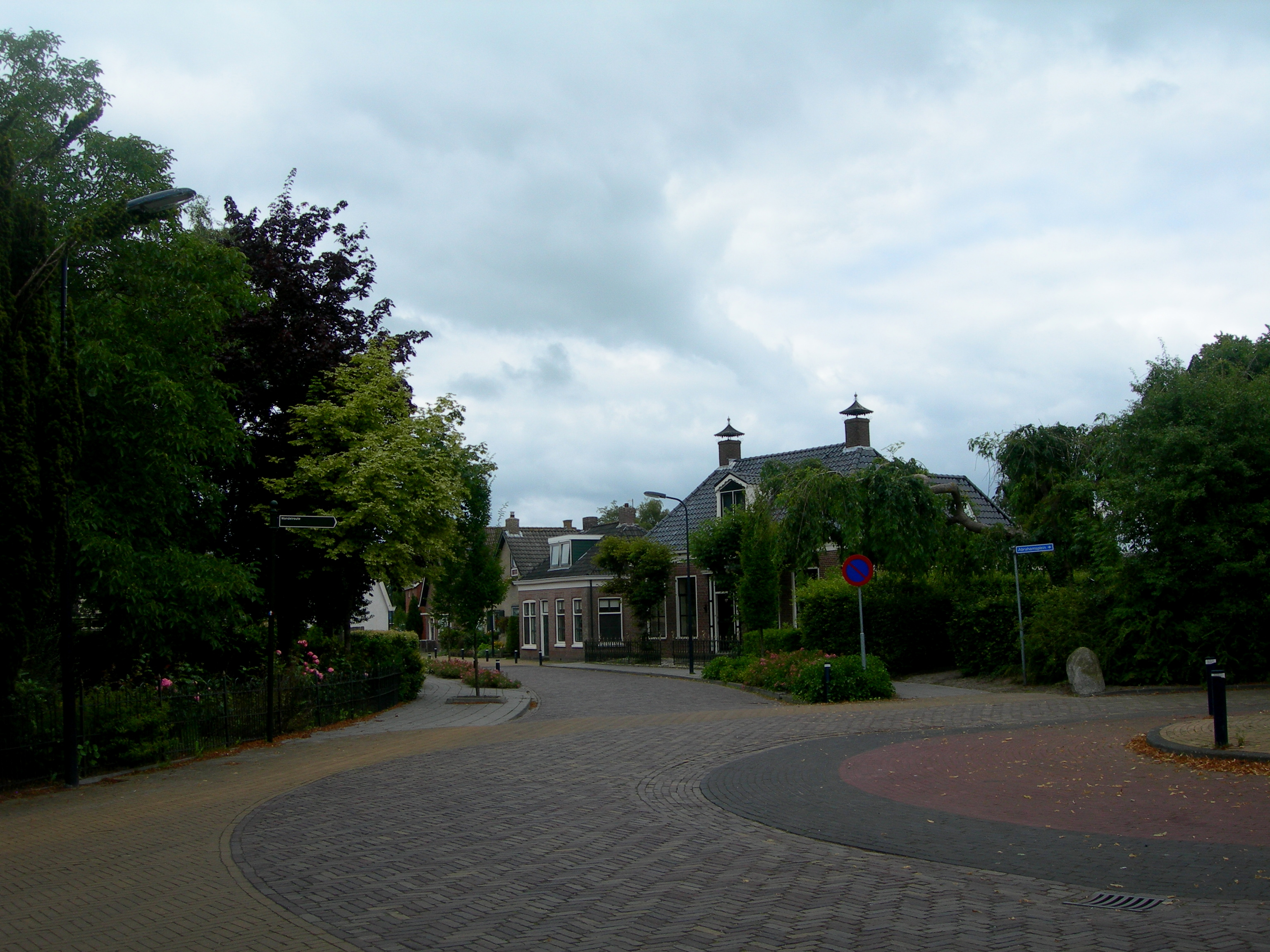
Abraham Square

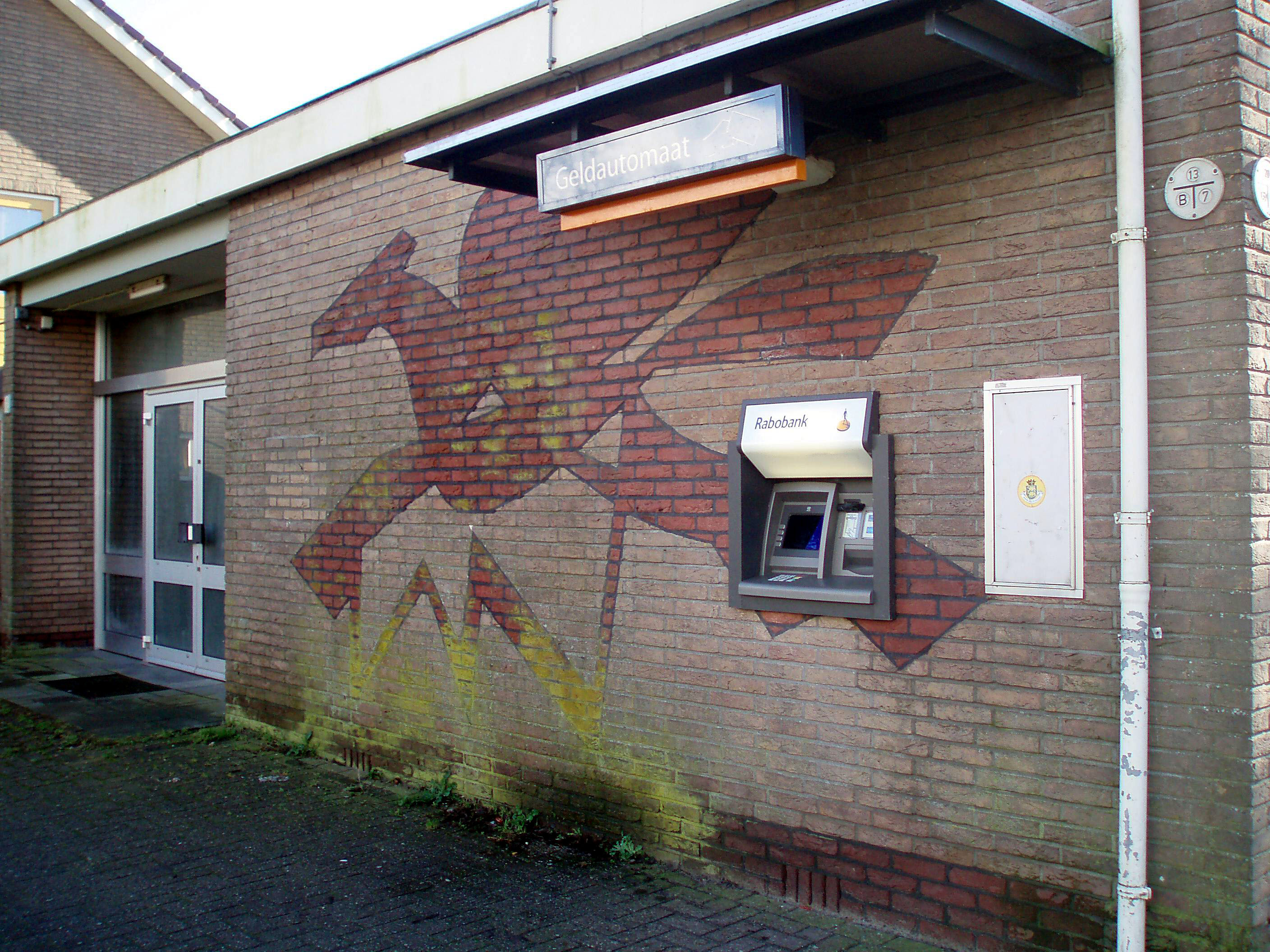
Wall art

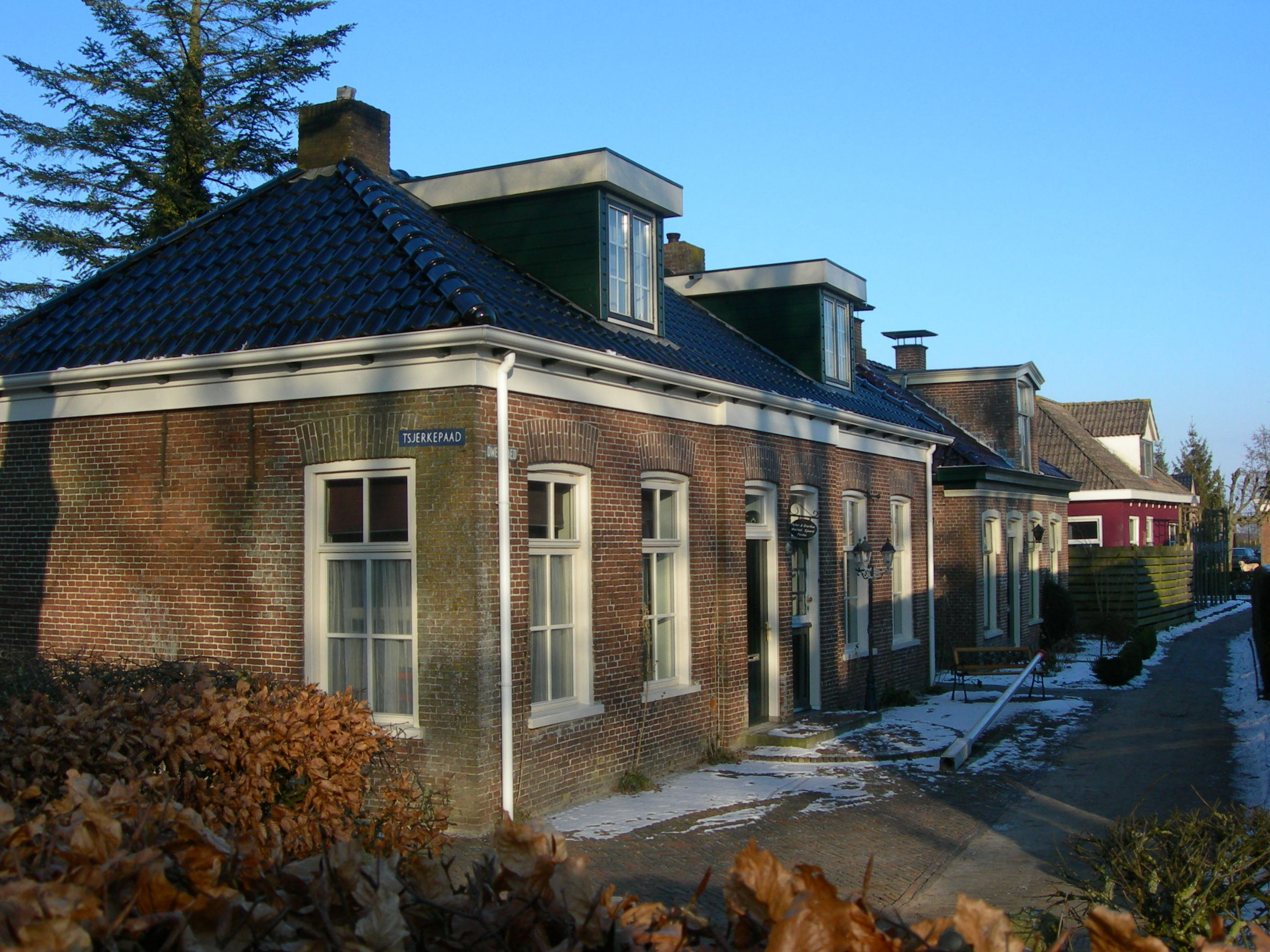
Village street

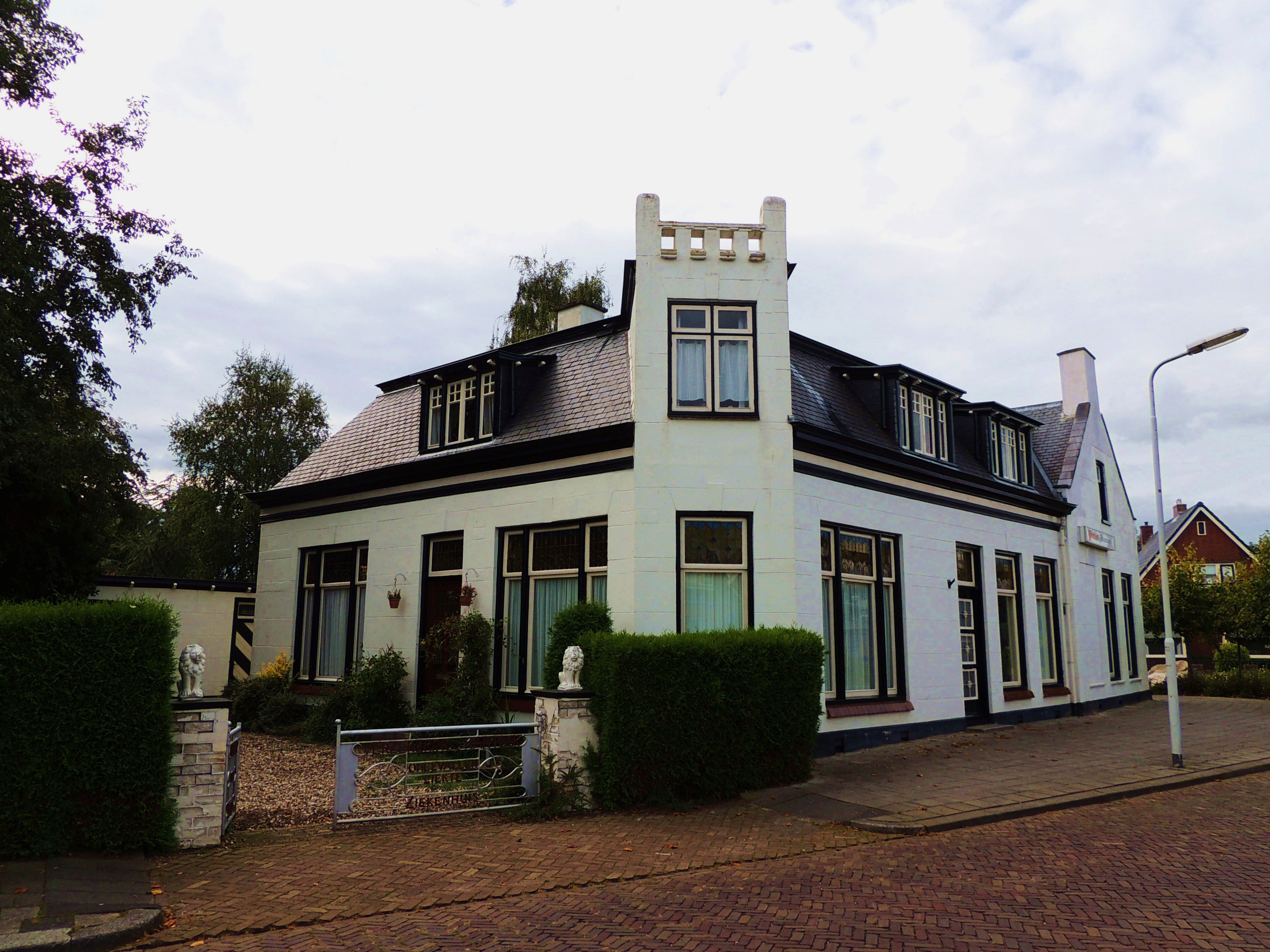
Former pub
