= Protestant church of Augustinusga =

Church in Augustinusga, Netherlands

Protestant church of Augustinusga Saint Augustine’s church
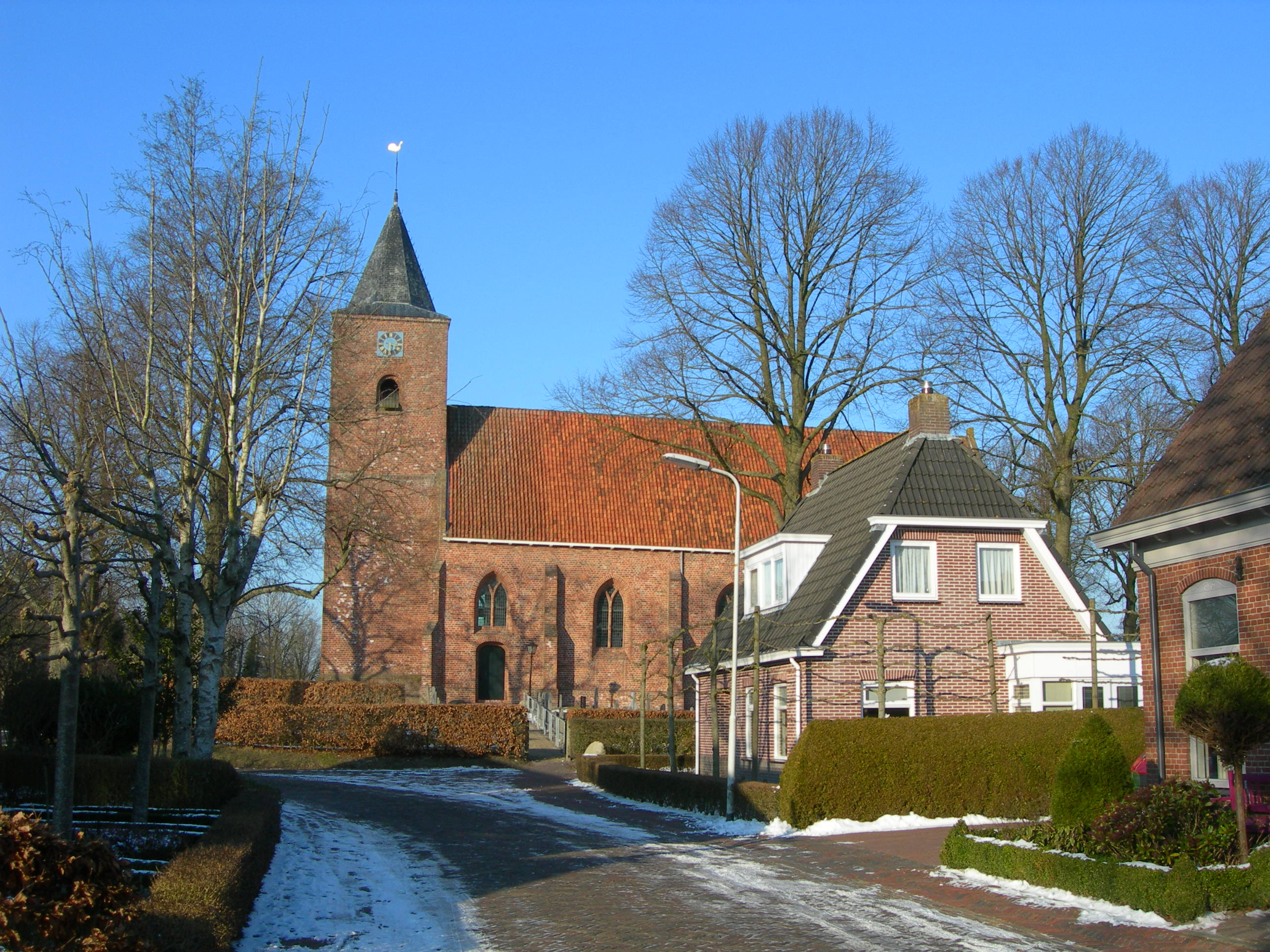
- Church of Augustinusga
- Protestant church of Augustinusga; Saint Augustine’s church
- 53.218°N 6.163°E

History
- Dedication: Before the Reformation, to Saint Augustine

Specifications
- Materials: Brick

The Protestant church of Augustinusga or Saint Augustine's church is a religious building in Augustinusga, Netherlands, one of the medieval churches in Friesland.

The church was built in the 15th century and has a tower that dates from the 13th century, built out of brick. The building was once a Roman Catholic church dedicated to Saint Augustine, becoming a Protestant church after the Protestant Reformation. It is listed as a Rijksmonument, number 7032. The building is located on the Geawei 15.
