= List of windmills in Friesland (D) =

List of windmills in Friesland, Netherlands

A list of windmills in the Dutch province of Friesland, locations starting D.

== Locations ==
Location	Name of mill	Type	Built	Notes	Photograph
Damwâld	De Mearmin; 53°17′35″N 6°00′43″E	Grondzeiler	2015		
Damwâld	De Welkomst; 53°17′22″N 5°59′22″E	Stellingmolen	1777	Burnt down 1911.	
Damwâld	Hoogfenne Polder; Waterschap de Fennen en de Hoogfenne; 53°17′11″N 5°57′14″E	Grondzeiler	1878	Demolished 1931.	
Damwâld	Korenmolen van Murmerwoude; 53°17′22″N 5°59′22″E	Standerdmolen	Before 1639	Demolished between 1762 and 1777.	
Damwâld	53°17′04″N 5°57′15″E		Before 1854	Demolished before 1874.	
Damwâld	Polder 26; 53°17′27″N 5°57′24″E		1850	Demolished c.1931.	
Damwâld	Polder 52; 53°17′06″N 5°58′09″E		Before 1854	Demolished before 1926.	
Dearsum	Korenmolen van Speers	Standerdmolen	Before 1481	Demolished before 1664.	
Dearsum	Molen van J. S. G. T. van Burmania Rengers; 53°05′08″N 5°42′27″E		Before 1832	Demolished 1833.	
Dearsum	Polder 208; 53°04′45″N 5°42′50″E		Before 1832	Demolished before 1929.	
Dearsum	Polder 209; 53°04′49″N 5°42′55″E		Before 1832	Demolished before 1929.	
Dearsum	Polder 210; 53°04′51″N 5°43′55″E		Before 1832	Demolished before 1929.	
Dearsum	Polder 211; 53°04′55″N 5°44′10″E		Before 1832	Demolished before 1850.	
Dearsum	Polder 212; 53°04′55″N 5°44′17″E		Before 1832	Demolished before 1929.	
Dearsum	Polder 213; 53°05′18″N 5°44′12″E		Before 1873	Demolished before 1928.	
Dearsum	Polder 214; 53°05′21″N 5°44′09″E		Before 1832	Demolished before 1850.	
Dearsum	Polder 215; 53°05′16″N 5°43′51″E		Before 1832	Demolished before 1929.	
Dearsum	Polder 216; 53°05′25″N 5°42′47″E		Before 1832	Demolished before 1929.	
Dearsum	Polder 217; 53°05′20″N 5°42′33″E		Before 1832	Demolished before 1929.	
Dearsum	Polder 218; 53°05′30″N 5°43′04″E		Before 1832	Demolished before 1929.	
Dearsum	Polder 219; 53°05′40″N 5°43′21″E		Before 1832	Demolished before 1929.	
De Blesse	De Mars; 52°50′35″N 6°02′20″E	Stellingmolen	1834	Demolished 1958.	
De Blesse	De Mars; 52°50′35″N 6°02′20″E	Stellingmolen	1997		
De Blesse	Polder 137; 52°50′46″N 6°02′07″E		1877	Demolished before 1924.	
De Blesse	52°51′02″N 6°01′39″E	Weidemolen	Before 1921		
De Blesse	52°51′05″N 6°02′02″E		Before 1926		
Dedgum	Arkumerpoldermolen; 53°01′32″N 5°29′26″E		Before 1832	Demolished before 1929.	
Dedgum	Dedgumerpoldermolen; 53°01′47″N 5°30′06″E	Spinnenkopmolen	Before 1832	Demolished post-1930.	
Dedgum	Polder 22; 53°01′29″N 5°29′44″E	Stellingmolen	Before 1932	Demolished post-1929.	
Dedgum	Polder 23; 53°01′20″N 5°29′35″E	Spinnenkopmolen	Before 1832	Demolished before 1929.	
De Falom	De Kleine Molen; 53°15′43″N 6°00′01″E	Grondzeiler	1875	Demolished 1954.	
De Falom	Molen van Cornelis Volkersma; 53°16′09″N 6°01′14″E		Before 1832	Demolished before 1850.	
De Falom	Molen van Jan Sikkema; 53°16′02″N 6°00′50″E		Before 1832	Demolished before 1850.	
De Falom	Molen van Lieuwe Halbesma; 53°16′08″N 6°00′37″E		Before 1832	Demolished before 1850.	
De Falom	Molen van Wijger Venema; 53.°N 6.°E		1832	Demolished post-1850.	
De Falom	Polder 171; 53°15′28″N 6°00′31″E		Before 1854	Demolished before 1926.	
De Falom	Polder 171a 53°15′35″N 6°00′30″E	Grondzeiler	Before 1854	Demolished before 1926.	
De Falom	Polder 172; 53°15′37″N 6°00′40″E		Before 1832	Demolished before 1850.	
De Hoeve	Paaltjasker	Tjasker	1996		
De Hoeve	Molen van Albert Bovenkamp; 52°53′18″N 6°04′09″E	Spinnenkopmolen	Before 1832	Demolished before 1850.	
De Hoeve	Molen van Albert Bovenkamp; 52°53′24″N 6°04′09″E	Spinnenkopmolen	Before 1832	Demolished before 1850.	
De Hoeve	Polder 5; 52°53′38″N 6°04′29″E		Before 1877	Demolished before 1922.	
De Hoeve	Polder 6; 52°54′14″N 6°05′41″E		Before 1877	Demolished before 1922.	
De Hoeve	Polder 7; 52°54′35″N 6°06′12″E		Before 1877	Demolished before 1922.	
De Hoeve	Polder 8; 52°52′59″N 6°04′28″E		Before 1877	Demolished before 1929.	
De Hoeve	52°53′42″N 6°05′15″E	Tjasker	1877	Demolished post-1929.	
De Hoeve	52°53′39″N 6°05′14″E	Tjasker	1877	Demolished post-1929.	
Deinum	Windmotor Van der Meer	Iron windpump	1936		
Deinum	Boktjasker van Hoogstins; 53°11′19″N 5°42′51″E	Boktjasker		Demolished post-1929.	
Deinum				Permission granted for erection in 1853. Possibly not built.	
Deinum	Molen van H. van der Meer. 53°11′39″N 5°43′13″E	Spinnenkopmolen	Before 1832	Demolished c.1952.	
Deinum	Molen van Ritzumazijl; 53°11′59″N 5°44′20″E	Standerdmolen	Before 1622	Demolished c.1832.	
Deinum	Polder 16; Polder De Jong; 53°11′59″N 5°43′10″E	Grondzeiler	Before 1873	Demolished post-1929.	
Deinum	Polder 71; 53°11′27″N 5°42′11″E		Before 1873	Demolished before 1929.	
Deinum	Polder 72; 53°11′13″N 5°42′36″E	Grondzeiler		Demolished before 1928.	
Deinum	Polder 73; 53°11′46″N 5°43′18″E	Grondzeiler	Before 1850	Demolished post-1928.	
Deinum	Ritsumapolder; Ritsumaburen; 53°12′07″N 5°44′51″E	Grondzeiler	1859	Burnt down 1965.	
De Knipe	Knijpster Molen; 52°58′08″N 5°58′11″E	Standerdmolen	Before 1625	Demolished 1811.	
De Knipe	Knijpster Molen; 52°58′08″N 5°58′11″E	Stellingmolen	1811	Moved to Hardenburg, Overijssel 1858.	
De Knipe	Molen van Bovenknijpe; 52°57′58″N 5°59′26″E	Standerdmolen	Before 1691	Demolished post-1788.	
De Knipe	Molen van Harmen Bosscher; 52°58′18″N 5°57′50″E		Before 1832	Demolished before 1850.	
De Knipe	Molen van Hendrik Nijenhuis; 52°58′09″N 5°57′18″E		Before 1832	Demolished before 1850.	
De Knipe	Polder 1; 52°57′49″N 5°57′39″E		Before 1877	Demolished before 1922.	
De Knipe	Nieuw Polder 2; 52°57′49″N 5°57′33″E	Spinnenkopmolen	Before 1877	Demolished post-1922.	
De Knipe	Oud Polder 2; 52°57′46″N 5°57′27″E		1832	Demolished before 1877.	
De Knipe	52°57′23″N 5°57′52″E				
De Knipe			Before 1649	Demolished post-1650.	
Delfstrahuizen	Molen van Jelle Meinez; 52°53′18″N 5°51′43″E		Before 1832	Demolished before 1850.	
Delfstrahuizen	Molen van Meine Klijnsma; 52°52′36″N 5°49′03″E	Spinnenkopmolen	Before 1832	Demolished post-1850.	
Delfstrahuizen	Molen van Reinder de Jong; 52°53′35″N 5°51′42″E		Before 1832	Demolished before 1850.	
Delfstrahuizen	Polder 16 't Groote Veld; 52°54′03″N 5°50′50″E	Grondzeiler	Before 1832	Demolished post-1930.	
Delfstrahuizen	Polder 17; 52°53′33″N 5°50′57″E	Spinnenkopmolen	Before 1832	Demolished before 1929.	
Delfstrahuizen	Polder 18; 52°53′17″N 5°50′43″E	Spinnenkopmolen	Before 1832	Demolished before 1929.	
Delfstrahuizen	Polder 19; 52°52′59″N 5°50′27″E	Spinnenkopmolen	Before 1832	Demolished before 1929.	
Delfstrahuizen	Polder 20; 52°52′53″N 5°49′51″E	Spinnenkopmolen	Before 1832	Demolished before 1929.	
Delfstrahuizen	Polder 21; 52°52′47″N 5°49′31″E	Spinnenkopmolen	Before 1832	Demolished before 1929.	
Delfstrahuizen	Polder 22; 52°52′39″N 5°49′19″E	Spinnenkopmolen	Before 1832	Demolished before 1929.	
Delfstrahuizen	Polder 23; 52°52′38″N 5°49′21″E	Spinnenkopmolen	Before 1832	Demolished before 1929.	
Delfstrahuizen	Polder 24; 52°52′31″N 5°49′07″E		Before 1877	Demolished before 1929.	
Delfstrahuizen	Polder 24a 52°52′17″N 5°49′48″E		Before 1877	Demolished before 1929.	
Delfstrahuizen	Polder 24b 52°51′56″N 5°50′49″E		Before 1877	Demolished before 1932.	
Delfstrahuizen	Polder 25; 52°52′09″N 5°51′10″E	Spinnenkopmolen	Before 1832	Demolished post-1930.	
Delfstrahuizen	Polder 25a 52°52′29″N 5°50′41″E		1877	Demolished before 1932.	
Delfstrahuizen	Polder 26; 52°52′35″N 5°51′35″E	Spinnenkopmolen	Before 1832	Demolished before 1929.	
Delfstrahuizen	Polder 26a 52°52′17″N 5°51′23″E	Spinnenkopmolen	1877	Demolished before 1932.	
Delfstrahuizen	Polder Het Zandhuizer Veld; 52°53′06″N 5°52′24″E	Grondzeiler	Between 1832 and 1850	Demolished before 1929.	
De Trieme	Polder De Hammen; 53°16′52″N 6°58′23″E	Grondzeiler	1907	Demolished 1966.	
De Trieme	53°16′37″N 6°04′29″E		Before 1916	Demolished before 1930.	
De Trieme	Tjasker aan de Drie Dollen; 53°16′55″N 6°04′56″E	Tjasker	Before 1916	Demolished post-1928.	
De Veenhoop	Molen van M. van Vierssen; 53°05′19″N 5°56′14″E	Spinnenkopmolen	Before 1832	Demolished between 1850 and 1876.	
De Veenhoop	Molen van Pieter Pel; 53°05′23″N 5°56′54″E	Spinnenkopmolen	Before 1832	Demolished before 1850.	
De Veenhoop	Molen van Sieger schuurmans 53°05′16″N 5°56′15″E	Spinnenkopmolen	Before 1832	Demolished between 1850 and 1876.	
De Veenhoop	Polder 218; De Hoop; 53°05′21″N 5°56′04″E	Grondzeiler	1837	Demolished 1924.	
De Veenhoop	Polder 219; 53°04′58″N 5°56′01″E	Spinnenkopmolen	Before 1832	Demplished post-1850.	
De Veenhoop	Polder 220; 53°05′40″N 5°56′55″E	Spinnenkopmolen	Before 1832	Demolished between 1850 and 1924.	
De Westereen	Molen van Douwe Halbesma; 53°15′38″N 6°01′31″E		Before 1832	Demolished before 1850.	
De Westereen	Molen van Gerben Hoekstra; 53°15′50″N 6°02′54″E		Before 1832	Demolished post-1850.	
De Westereen	Molen van Roemers		1859	Burnt down 1860.	
De Westereen	Molen van Roemers; 53°15′39″N 6°02′20″E		1860	Burnt down 1875.	
De Westereen	Molen van Roemers; 53°15′39″N 6°02′20″E	Stellingmolen	1875	Demolished 1936, base demolished 1965.	
De Westereen	Molen van Sikke Jonksma; 53°16′29″N 6°02′21″E	Spinnenkopmolen	Before 1832	Demolished before 1850.	
De Westereen	Molen van Van der Meulen; 53°15′39″N 6°02′02″E		1841	Demolished or moved between 1855 and 1860.	
De Westereen	Polder 172a 53°15′42″N 6°01′34″E	Grondzeiler	Before 1854	Demolished post-1926.	
De Westereen	Polder 173; 53°15′59″N 6°02′02″E		Before 1854	Demolished before 1926.	
De Westereen	Polder 174; 53°15′49″N 6°02′11″E		Before 1854	Demolished before 1926.	
De Westereen	Polder De Roos; 53.°N 6.°E		Before 1854	Demolished before 1926.	
De Westereen		Spinnenkopmolen		Dempolished post-1928.	
Dijken	Hoeksterpolder; Polder 198; 52°57′45″N 5°42′20″E	Spinnenkopmolen	Before 1832	Demolished c.1938.	
Dijken	Polder 194; 52°56′47″N 5°42′22″E		Before 1832	Demolished post-1909.	
Dijken	Polder Cnossen; Polder 195; 52°57′31″N 5°42′26″E		Before 1832	Demolished before 1929.	
Dijken	Polder 196; 52°57′35″N 5°42′25″E		Before 1832	Demolished before 1929.	
Dijken	Polder 197; 52°57′42″N 5°42′18″E		Before 1832	Burnt down 1914.	
Dijken	Vegelinspolder; 52°57′20″N 5°42′25″E	Stellingmolen	1730	Demolished 1927.	
Dokkum	De Grote Molen; 53°19′25″N 5°59′51″E	Standerdmolen	Before 1511	Moved within Dokkum between 1616 and 1664.	
Dokkum	De Grote Molen; 53°19′22″N 5°59′53″E	Standerdmolen	Between 1616 and 1644	Demolished 1840. De Hoop built on the site in 1849.	
Dokkum	De Hoop; 53°19′22″N 5°59′53″E	Stellingmolen	1849		
Dokkum	De Marmeerin; Geestermeer Molen; 53°18′53″N 5°58′34″E	Grondzeiler	1968	Dismantled in 2014 pending restoration and rebuilding at Damwâld.	
Dokkum	De Driepiepstermolen			Burnt down 1862. Zeldenrust built on the site in 1863. Molendatabase (in Dutch); De Hollandsche Molen (in Dutch)	
Dokkum	Zeldenrust; 53°19′28″N 5°59′40″E	Stellingmolen	1862		
Dokkum	De Bouwlust; Voor Koopenhandel en Zeevaart; 53°19′21″N 6°00′34″E	Stellingmolen	1820	Moved to Oudega 1925, base remains.	
Dokkum	Het Hert; 53°19′35″N 5°59′26″E	Stellingmolen	1756	Demolished 1881.	
Dokkum	Het Hert; De Reus; 53°19′35″N 5°59′26″E	Stellingmolen	1881	Demolished 1932.	
Dokkum	De Jonge Sytske; 53°19′37″N 5°59′10″E	Stellingmolen	1895	Demolished 1937.	
Dokkum	De Phenix; 53°19′15″N 5°58′34″E	Stellingmolen	1814	Demolished 1897.	
Dokkum	De Phenix; 53°19′30″N 5°59′17″E	Stellingmolen	1897	Demolished 1939.	
Dokkum	Bonifaciuspolder; 53°19′07″N 6°00′16″E		Before 1854	Deolished before 1927.	
Dokkum	Chicoriemolen van Wijtze de Boer; 53°19′28″N 5°59′35″E		Before 1820	Demolished between 1845 and 1850.	
Dokkum	De Bockm; De Bok; 53°19′31″N 6°00′33″E	Stellingmolen	Before 1739	Moved to Groningen 1837.	
Dokkum	De Goede Verwachting; Molen Edzes; 53°19′45″N 6°00′26″E	Stellingmolen	1718	Moved to Enumatil, Groningen 1907.	
Dokkum	De Herderin; 53°19′15″N 5°58′34″E		1809	Burnt down 1813.	
Dokkum	De Jong Ulbe; 53°19′37″N 5°59′10″E		Before 1713	Demolished 1895.	
Dokkum	Driepijpstermolen; 53°19′28″N 5°59′40″E	Standerdmolen	Before 1616	Demolished between 1753 and 1788.	
Dokkum	Driepijpstermolen; 53°19′28″N 5°59′40″E	Stellingmolen	Between 1753 and 1803	Burnt down 1860.	
Dokkum	Eben Haëzer; 53°20′04″N 6°00′03″E	Stellingmolen	Before 1750	Demolished 1927.	
Dokkum	Hanspoortermolen; 53°19′37″N 5°59′41″E	Standerdmolen	Before 1616	Demolished between 1771 and 1788.	
Dokkum	Hanspoortermolen; 53°19′37″N 5°59′41″E	Stellingmolen	Before 1753	Burnt down 1842.	
Dokkum	Hoedemakerspoldermolen; 53°19′27″N 5°59′23″E	Grondzeiler	1807	Demolished 1955.	
Dokkum	Jantjes Zeepoldermolen; 53°19′02″N 5°59′56″E	Grondzeiler	1865	Demolished before 1929.	
Dokkum	Leermolen buiten de Aalsumerpoort; 53°19′59″N 5°59′41″E		1648	Demolished c.1698.	
Dokkum	53°19′31″N 5°59′19″E	Stellingmolen	Before 1660	Burnt down 1894.	
Dokkum	Molen bij de Aalsumerpoort; 53°19′41″N 6°00′06″E	Standerdmolen	Before 1616	Demolished 1760.	
Dokkum	Molen op de Kloosterdwinger; 53°19′42″N 5°59′52″E	Standerdmolen	Before 1616	Demolished 1708.	
Dokkum	Molen van Pieter Hania; 53°19′02″N 5°58′40″E		Before 1832	Demolished before 1850.	
Dokkum	Oliemolen van Rintje van der Herberg; 53°19′28″N 6°00′02″E	Stellingmolen	1829	Demolished 1852.	
Dokkum	Oostermolen; 53°19′33″N 6°00′06″E	Standerdmolen	Before 1511	Demolished before 1585.	
Dokkum	Polder 47; 53°19′11″N 5°58′42″E	Grondzeiler	Before 1850	Demolished between 1952 and 1961.	
Dokkum	Polder 48; 53°19′17″N 5°59′05″E	Spinnenkopmolen	Between 1830 and 1847	Demolished 1913.	
Dokkum	Polder 49A; 53°19′28″N 5°58′45″E	Grondzeiler	Before 1850	Demolished between 1952 and 1961.	
Dokkum	Polder 50; Polder de Berg Sions; 53.32322°N 6.01862°E	Weidemolen	Before 1811	Demolished c. 1822.	
Dokkum	Polder 50; Polder de Berg Sions; 53°19′17″N 6°00′54″E	Grondzeiler	Before 1854	Collapsed 1949.	
Dokkum	Polder 51; 53°19′01″N 6°00′32″E		Before 1854	Demolished before 1927.	
Dokkum	53°19′11″N 5°59′45″E	Weidemolen	Between 1874 and 1916	Demolished before 1930.	
Dokkum	Sipma's Molen; 53°19′14″N 5°59′43″E	Stellingmolen	Between 1718 and 1739	Burnt down 1913.	
Dokkum	53.°N 5.°E	Standerdmolen	Before 1466	Demolished post-1466.	
Dokkum	53°19′36″N 5°59′45″E	Standerdmolen	Before 1511	Moved within Dokkum c.1582.	
Dokkum	53°19′31″N 5°59′43″E	Standerdmolen	Before 1511	Moved within Dokkum c.1582.	
Dokkum	53°18′40″N 6°00′42″E	Tjasker	1850	Demolished post-1930.	
Dokkum	name 53°18′34″N 6°00′42″E	Tjasker	1850	Demolished post-1930.	
Dokkum			Before 1739	Demolished post-1813.	
Dokkum	Weidemolen				
Dokkum			Before 1756	Demolished 1765.	
Dokkum	53°19′51″N 6°00′05″E		Before 1866	Demolished before 1930.	
Dokkum	53°19′51″N 6°00′05″E		Before 1866	Demolished before 1930.	
Dokkum			Before 1739	Demolished post-1834.	
Dongjum	Dongjumerpoldermolen; Molen 2; 53°12′28″N 5°30′52″E	Grondzeiler	Before 1832	Demolished 1931.	
Dongjum	Polder 30A; 53°12′56″N 5°33′24″E	Grondzeiler	Before 1832	Demolished post-1850.	
Dongjum	Polder 31; 53°12′50″N 5°33′10″E	Grondzeiler	Before 1832	Demolished post-1850.	
Dongjum	Polder 33; 53°12′11″N 5°33′13″E	Grondzeiler	Before 1832	Demolished post-1850.	
Doniaburen	name 52°59′54″N 5°25′37″E		1850	Demolished post-1932.	
Doniaga	Bouwhuispoldermolen; 52°54′26″N 5°45′43″E	Spinnenkopmolen	Before 1832	Burnt down c.1915.	
Doniaga	Landmanpoldermolen; 52°53′35″N 5°45′15″E	Spinnenkopmolen	1800	Demolished 1947.	
Doniaga	Molen van Fritske Hepkema; 52°54′42″N 5°44′16″E		Before 1832	Demolished post-1850.	
Doniaga	Polder Oenema; Brânslansmole; 52°53′59″N 5°45′00″E	Grondzeiler	1813	Demolished 1934.	
Donkerbroek	Donkerbroeckstermolen; 53°01′40″N 6°15′30″E	Standerdmolen	Before 1664	Demolished between 1739 and 1808.	
Donkerbroek	Molen van Foppe Klooster; 53°01′04″N 6°13′48″E	Spinnenkopmolen	Before 1832	Demolished post-1850.	
Donkerbroek	Molen van Teyema; 53°01′01″N 6°13′33″E	Grondzeiler		Moved to Beekbergen, Gelderland c.1900.	
Donkerbroek	Molen van Van den Wulp; 53°01′40″N 6°15′30″E	Beltmolen	1808	Demolished before 1922.	
Donkerbroek	Oud Polder 5; 53°01′10″N 6°13′32″E		1832	Demolished before 1877.	
Donkerbroek	Nieuw Polder 5; 53°01′01″N 6°13′25″E		Before 1877	Demolished before 1923.	
Donkerbroek	Polder 6; 53°00′55″N 6°13′24″E		Before 1877	Demolished before 1923.	
Donkerbroek	Polder 6a 53°00′55″N 6°13′35″E		Before 1877	Demolished before 1923.	
Donkerbroek	Polder 13; 53°02′27″N 6°15′32″E		Before 1877	Demolished before 1932.	
Donkerbroek	Polder 14; 53°02′27″N 6°16′00″E		Before 1877	Demolished before 1932.	
Donkerbroek	Polder 15; 53°01′23″N 6°13′56″E		Before 1877	Demolished before 1923.	
Donkerbroek	53°01′30″N 6°15′28″E	Standerdmolen	Before 1664	Demolished before 1718.	
Donkerbroek	Water en Korenmolen van H. en J. Hartholt; 53°01′01″N 6°13′33″E			Burnt down 1882.	
Drachten	De Nijverheid; 53°06′23″N 6°05′26″E	Stellingmolen	1854	Burnt down 1903, converted base remains.	
Drachten	Windmotor De Veenhoop; 53°06′08″N 5°58′15″E	Iron windpump	1926		
Drachten	De Duivenmatte; 53°06′26″N 6°06′32″E	Standerdmolen	Before 1718	Blown down 1723.	
Drachten	De Duivenmatte; 53°11′50″N 6°06′32″E	Stellingmolen	1723	Burnt down 1736.	
Drachten	De Duivenmatte; 53°06′26″N 6°06′32″E	Stellingmolen	1737	Burnt down 1769.	
Drachten	De Duivenmatte; 53°11′50″N 6°06′32″E	Stellingmolen	1769	Burnt down 1811.	
Drachten	De Molen Durkz	Standerdmolen	Before 1664	Moved within Drachten 1665.	
Drachten	Goet Vooruytsigt; 53°06′21″N 6°05′22″E	Stellingmolen	1717	Demolished 1921.	
Drachten	Het Hert; Eerste Molen van Durksz; 53°06′23″N 6°05′48″E	Stellingmolen	1716	Moved to Rosmalen, North Brabant in 1902.	
Drachten	Molen van Famille Durksz; 53°06′22″N 6°05′37″E	Stellingmolen	1837	Demolished 1939/40, base demolished 1949.	
Drachten	Molen van Van Beek; 53°06′22″N 6°06′45″E	Stellingmolen	1847	Demolished 1911.	
Drachten	Molen van Weis; 53°06′22″N 6°06′36″E	Stellingmolen	1846	Demolished 1928.	
Drachten	Polder 1; 53°06′12″N 6°05′12″E		Before 1850	Demolished before 1925.	
Drachten	Polder 226; 53°06′16″N 6°02′33″E		Before 1876		
Drachten	Polder 227; 53°06′11″N 6°04′17″E		Before 1876	Demolished post-1924.	
Drachten	Polder 228; 53°07′06″N 6°04′22″E		Before 1876	Demolished post-1924.	
Drachten	Polder 228a 53°07′15″N 6°04′43″E				
Drachten	53°06′07″N 6°05′17″E	Grondzeiler	Before 1875	Demolished before 1825.	
Driezum	Korenmolen van Driesum; 53°17′47″N 6°02′40″E	Standerdmolen	Before 1622	Demolished c.1832.	
Driezum	Polder 53; 53°17′27″N 6°03′07″E		Before 1832	Demolished post-1850.	
Driezum	Polder 53a 53°17′28″N 6°02′46″E		Before 1832	Demolished post-1850.	
Driezum	Polder 54; 53°17′35″N 6°03′20″E		Before 1832	Demolished post-1850.	
Driezum	Polder 55; 53°17′31″N 6°03′44″E		Before 1832	Demolished post-1850.	
Driezum	Polder 56; 53°17′38″N 6°03′59″E		Before 1832	Demolished post-1850.	
Drogeham	Korenmolen van Drogeham; 53°12′08″N 6°06′40″E	Standerdmolen	Before 1664	Demolished post-1739.	
Drogeham	Korenmolen van Drogeham; 53°12′09″N 6°06′56″E	Standerdmolen	Before 1832	Demolished 1859.	
Dronryp	De Poelen; De Puollen; 53°11′33″N 5°40′01″E	Grondzeiler	1850		
Dronryp	Kingmatille	Grondzeiler	1870	Moved 50m 1985.	
Dronryp	Kingmatille; 53°11′08″N 5°36′58″E	Grondzeiler	1985		
Dronryp		Spinnenkopmolen	1841	Demolished 1878, replaced by De Hatsumermolen. Molendatabase (in Dutch); De Hollandsche Molen (in Dutch)	
Dronryp	De Hatsumermolen; 53°10′46″N 5°43′47″E	Grondzeiler	1878		
Dronryp			1833	Moved to Menaldum in 1981; Molendatabase (in Dutch); De Hollandsche Molen (in Dutch)	
Dronryp	Dronrijpster Zuiderpoldermolen; 53°11′09″N 5°40′04″E	Grondzeiler	Before 1832	Demolished 1931.	
Dronryp	53°11′31″N 5°38′41″E	Stellingmolen	1700	Collapsed 1847.	
Dronryp	Molen van Kuiken; Hommeka-Statemolen; 53°11′31″N 5°38′41″E	Stellingmolen	1847	Moved to Bergumerdam 1905.	
Dronryp	Hooipoldermolen; 53°12′09″N 5°40′14″E		Before 1832	Demolished before 1929.	
Dronryp	De Keimptilsterpoldermolen; 53°11′06″N 5°37′02″E	Grondzeiler	1870	Demolished 1986, rebuilt within Dronryp 1987.	
Dronryp	Molen van Bernhardus Buma; 53°11′25″N 5°40′09″E	Spinnenkopmolen	Before 1832	Demolished post-1850.	
Dronryp	Molen van Dronrijp; 53°11′31″N 5°38′41″E	Standerdmolen	Before 1543	Demolished 1700.	
Dronryp	Molen van Epeus Huber; 53°12′02″N 5°38′04″E	Spinnenkopmolen	Before 1832	Demolished before 1850.	
Dronryp	Molen van Jr. Idzerd Æbinga van Humalda; 53°11′47″N 5°38′04″E		Before 1832	Demolished before 1850.	
Dronryp	Molen van Petrus van Beijma; 53°11′06″N 5°37′02″E	Spinnenkopmolen	Before 1832	Demolished 1870.	
Dronryp	Molen van Sake Tjepkema; 53°11′47″N 5°37′22″E		Before 1832	Demolished before 1850.	
Dronryp	Molen van Willem de Jong; 53°11′55″N 5°39′37″E	Spinnenkopmolen	Before 1832	Demolished post-1850.	
Dronryp	Noorderpoldermolen; 53°11′59″N 5°38′03″E	Grondzeiler	1833	Moved to Menaldum 1981.	
Dronryp		Stellingmolen	1854	Burnt down 1858.	
Dronryp	Oorbijterspoldermolen; 53°11′40″N 5°37′36″E	Spinnenkopmolen	Before 1832	Demolished before 1929.	
Dronryp	Polder 48; 53°10′38″N 5°37′10″E	Grondzeiler	Before 1832	Demolished before 1953.	
Dronryp	Polder 48a 53°10′20″N 5°37′54″E		Before 1832	Demolished between 1850 and 1873.	
Dronryp	Polder 51; 53°10′46″N 5°37′47″E	Spinnenkopmolen	Before 1832	Demolished 1877.	
Dronryp	Polder 52; 53°11′17″N 5°38′16″E	Spinnenkopmolen	Before 1832	Demolished before 1929.	
Dronryp	Polder 53; 53°11′29″N 5°38′14″E	Spinnenkopmolen	Before 1832	Demolished before 1929.	
Dronryp	Polder 54; 53°11′39″N 5°38′06″E		Before 1873	Demolished before 1929.	
Dronryp	Polder 55; 53°11′41″N 5°40′23″E	Spinnenkopmolen	Before 1832	Demolished before 1929.	
Dronryp	Polder 55A; 53°11′23″N 5°40′10″E		Before 1873	Demolished before 1929.	
Dronryp	Polder 56; 53°11′43″N 5°40′50″E	Spinnenkopmolen	Before 1832	Demolished before 1929.	
Dronryp	Polder 57; 53°11′11″N 5°40′55″E	Spinnenkopmolen	Before 1832	Demolished before 1929.	
Dronryp	Polder 58; 53°11′07″N 5°40′45″E		Before 1832	Demolished before 1929.	
Dronryp	Polder 59; 53°10′59″N 5°40′53″E		Before 1832	Demolished before 1929.	
Dronryp	Polder Hatsum; 53°10′28″N 5°37′49″E			Demolished post-1928.	
Dronryp	53°11′36″N 5°38′20″E	Weidemolen			
Dronryp	Westerpoldermolen; 53°11′37″N 5°37′09″E	Grondzeiler	Before 1873	Burnt down 1950.	
Dronryp	Zaagmolen van Sybolt Wytzes de Boer; 53°11′35″N 5°38′40″E	Stellingmolen	1900	Demolished c.1924.	
Duurswoude			1861		

== Notes ==
Mills still standing marked in bold. Known building dates are bold, otherwise the date is the earliest known date the mill was standing.
