= Protestant church of Deinum =

Protestant church of Deinum Saint John the Baptist church
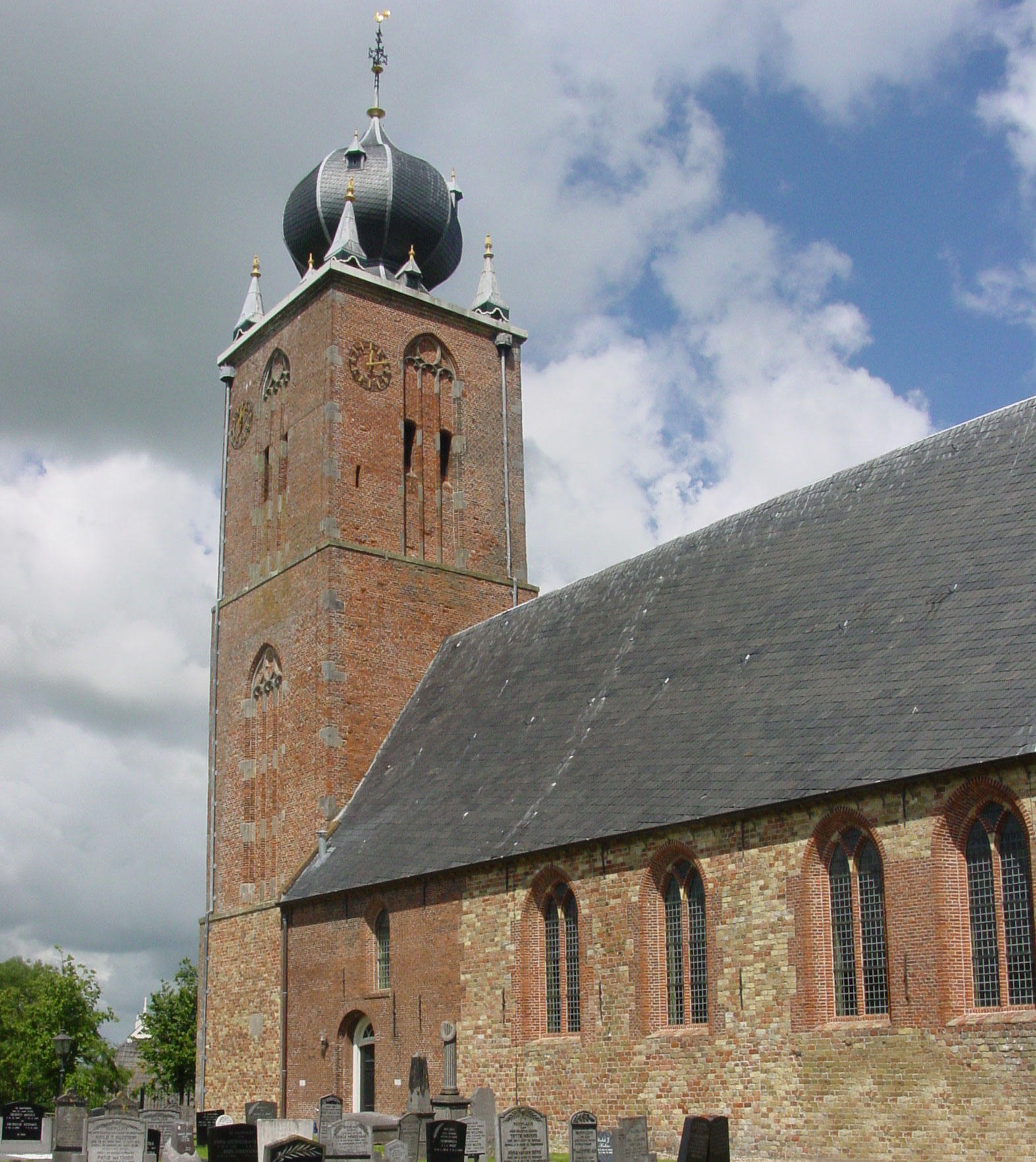
- Church of Deinum
- 53.1927°N 5.7226°E

History
- Dedication: before the reformation Saint John the Baptist

Specifications
- Materials: Brick

The Protestant church of Deinum or Saint John the Baptist church is a religious building in Deinum, Netherlands, one of the medieval churches in Friesland.

It is an early 13th-century building with a tower that dates from 1550-1567. The historic pipe organ was built in 1865 by Willem Hardorff from Leeuwarden. The church was originally a Roman Catholic church dedicated to Saint John the Baptist but became a Protestant church after the Protestant Reformation. It is listed as a Rijksmonument, number 28586.
