= Sije Visser =

Dutch football player

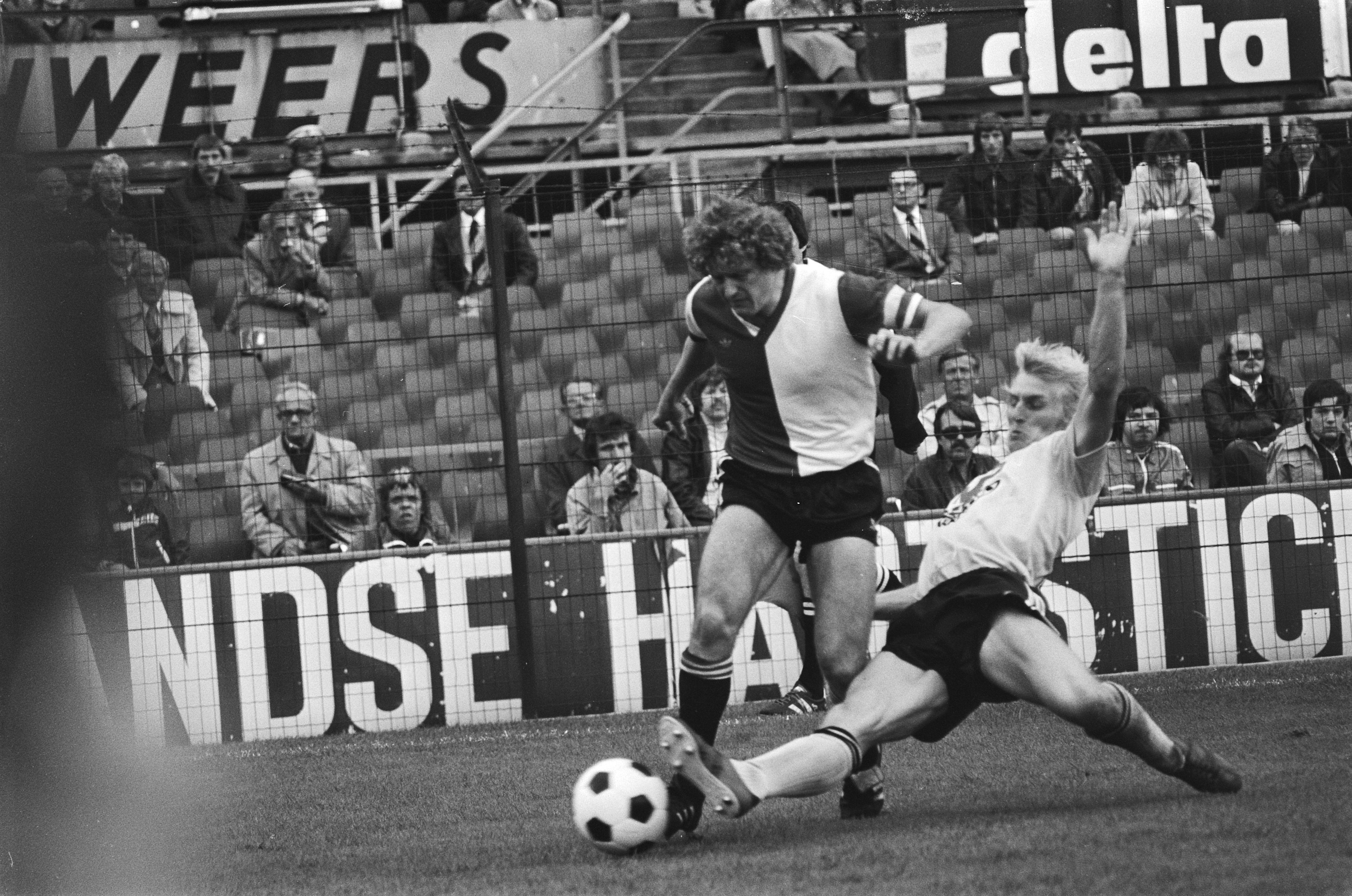
- Visser (right) tackling Wim Jansen (1978)

Personal information
- Full name: Sije Visser
- Date of birth: 27 August 1950 (age 76)
- Place of birth: Menaldum, Netherlands
- Position: Defender

Senior career*
Years	Team	Apps	(Gls)
1967–1971	Hermes DVS	69	(3)
1971–1986	NEC Nijmegen	440	(21)
Total		519	(24)
- * Club domestic league appearances and goals

Sije Visser (born 27 August 1950) is a Dutch former professional footballer and sports administrator. Known for his hard-working defensive play, he remains the record appearance holder at Eredivisie club NEC Nijmegen, playing 440 games over fifteen seasons.

== Career ==
Born in Menaldum, a village in Friesland, Visser started his career at semi-professional club Hermes DVS in Schiedam, where he played primarily as a left-back. In 1971, he signed his first professional contract at Eredivisie club NEC Nijmegen. He spent fifteen seasons with the club, becoming the all-time record appearance maker. After his retirement in 1986, he became a board member at the club, and also worked in the scouting department. He resigned from his position in 2014, in the wake of the club's relegation from the top flight.

After retirement he also worked as a tax adviser.

== After retirement ==
In April 2017 a documentary about Visser's career with NEC was broadcast by FOX Sports, called Een Leven Lang NEC (A lifetime of NEC). In September 2021, a crowdfunding campaign was set up by NEC supporters to erect a statue of Visser, as well as record goalscorer Frans Janssen, outside the Goffertstadion.

== Honours ==
NEC

- Eerste Divisie - 1974-75
