= De Kievit, Menaam =

Smock mill in Menaam, Friesland, Netherlands

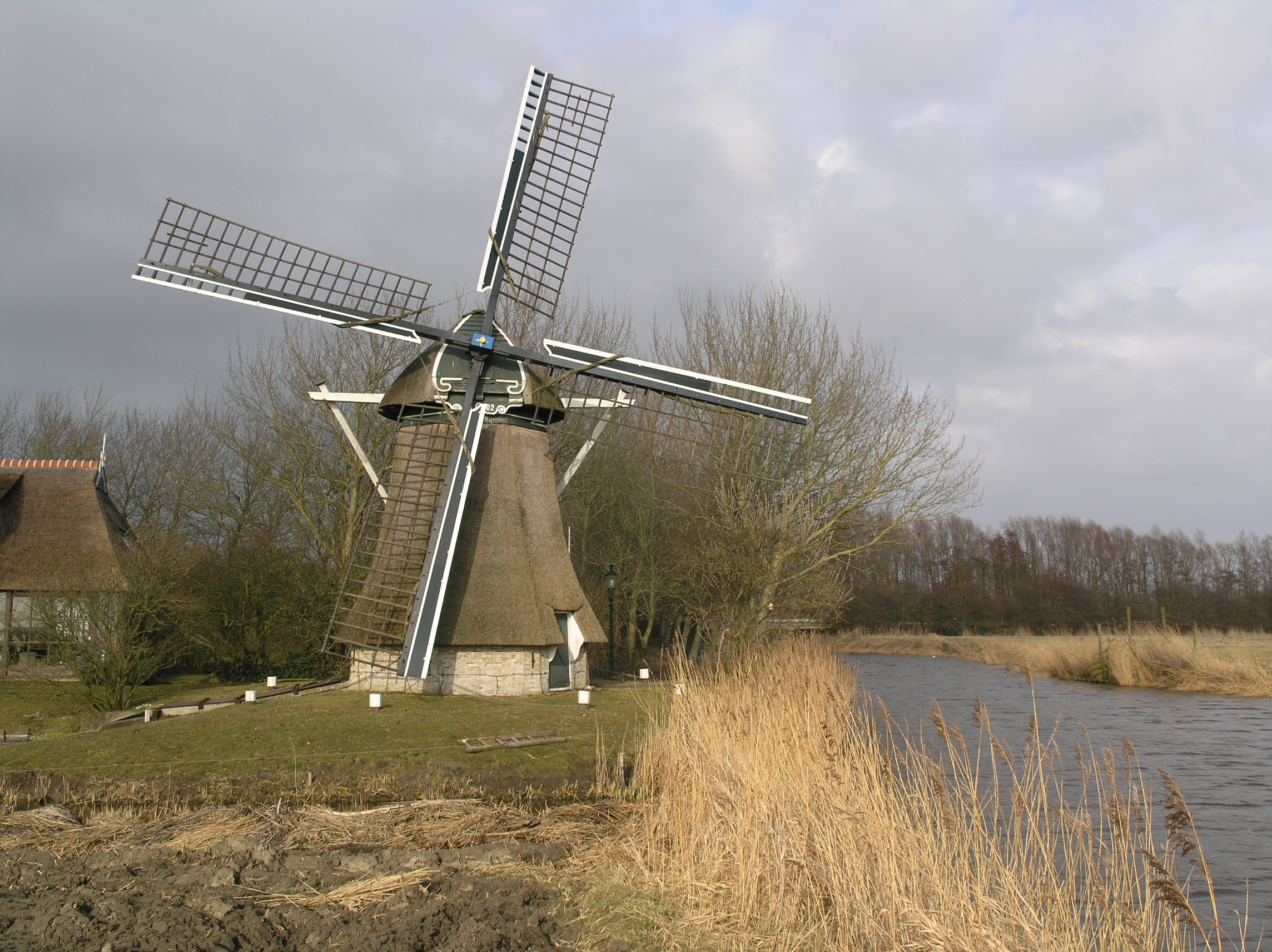
- De Kievit, March 2006.

Origin
- Mill name: De Kievit
- Mill location: Sânwei 21, 9036 VW Menaam
- Coordinates: 53°13′41″N 5°39′14″E
- Operator(s): Stichting Molens in Menameradiel
- Year built: 1802

Information
- Purpose: Drainage mill
- Type: Smock mill
- Storeys: Two storey smock
- Base storeys: Single storey base
- Smock sides: Eight sides
- No. of sails: Four sails
- Type of sails: Common sails
- Windshaft: Cast iron
- Winding: Tailpole and winch
- Type of pump: Archimedes screw

De Kievit (English: The Lapwing) is a smock mill in Menaam, Friesland, Netherlands which was built in 1802. The mill has been restored to working order. It is listed as a Rijksmonument.

== History ==
De Kievit was built in 1802 to drain or pump water into the 265-hectare (650-acre) Berikumerpolder as required. In 1986 it was sold to the Stichting Molens in Menaldumadeel. The mill was restored to working order between 1992 and 1995. It no longer drains the polder, but pumps water in a circuit for demonstration purposes. The mill is listed as a Rijksmonument, number 28578.

== Description ==
De Kievit is what the Dutch describe as a Grondzeiler. It is a two-storey smock mill on a single-storey base. There is no stage, the sails reaching almost to ground level. The mill is winded by tailpole and winch. The smock and cap are thatched. The sails are Common sails. They have a span of 14.70 metres (48 ft 3 in). The sails are carried on a cast-iron windshaft, which was cast by Gieterij Hardinxveld-Giessendam in 1987. The windshaft is 3.10 metres (10 ft 2 in) long. It also carries the brake wheel which has 44 cogs. This drives the wallower (25 cogs) at the top of the upright shaft. At the bottom of the upright shaft there are two crown wheels The upper crown wheel, which has 35 cogs drives an Archimedes' screw via a crown wheel. This screw was used to pump water into the polder. The lower crown wheel, which has 35 cogs, drives a gearwheel with 32 cogs on the axle of an Archimedes' screw, which was used to drain the polder. The axle of the screw is 29 centimetres (11 in) diameter and 5.25 metres (17 ft 3 in) long. The screw is 1.25 metres (4 ft 1 in) diameter. It is inclined at 10°. Each revolution of the screw lifts 610 litres (130 imp gal) of water.

== Public access ==
De Kievit is open to the public at any time it is working.
