= De Mars, De Blesse =

Windmill in De Blesse, Netherlands

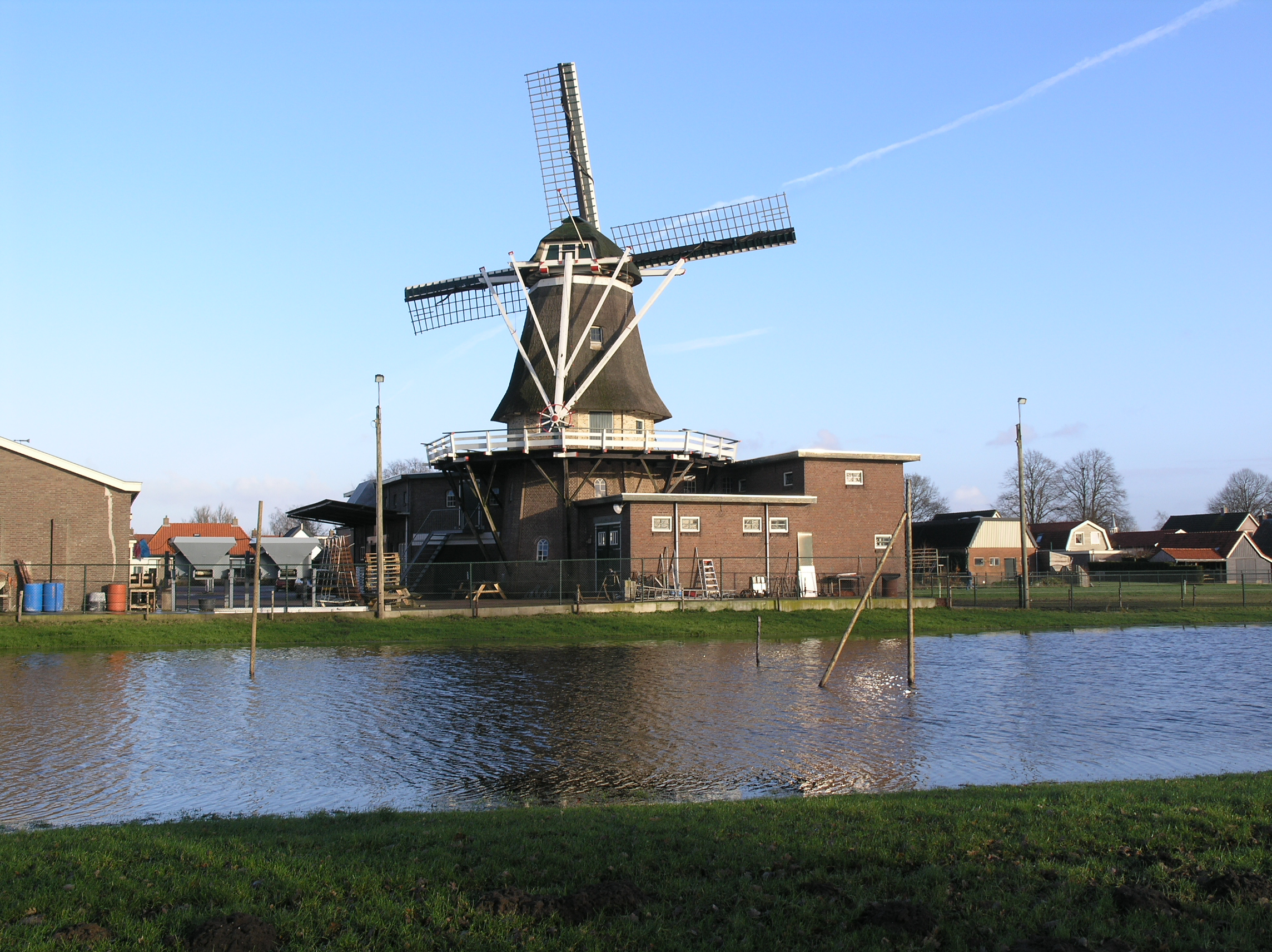
- De Mars

Origin
- Mill name: De Mars
- Mill location: Steenwijkerweg 50, 8397 LE, De Blesse
- Coordinates: 52°50′35″N 6°02′20″E
- Operator(s): Private
- Year built: 1997

Information
- Purpose: Corn mill
- Type: Smock mill
- Storeys: Three-storey smock
- Base storeys: Three-storey base
- Smock sides: Eight sides
- No. of sails: Four sails
- Type of sails: Common sails
- Windshaft: Cast iron
- Winding: Tailpole and winch
- No. of pairs of millstones: One pair
- Size of millstones: 1.30 metres (4 ft 3 in) diameter

De Mars is a smock mill in De Blesse, Friesland, Netherlands which was built in 1997 on the base of an earlier mill. The mill is listed as a Rijksmonument, number 527616.

== History ==
An unnamed smock mill was built here in 1834. It drove two pairs of 1.40 metres (4 ft 7 in) diameter millstones. The mill was probably built for Philips Schlecht. As built, it was a "grondzeiler", lacking the brick base it later stood on. The base was built in the late nineteenth century. An electric motor was used as auxiliary power from 1919. A sailstock broke c1925. The mill machinery was dismantled c1927. The mill was demolished c1958, leaving the base standing.

In 1985, the mill was bought by Mars, who decided to restore the mill back to working order. The drainage mill De Zwarte Haan, which stood by De Bildtse Polder, was purchased and dismantled in April 1997. In November 1997, the mill was re-erected at De Blesse. In June 1999, a new cap was placed on the mill. This had previously been on a mill at Neustadtgödens-Wedelfeld, Germany. The brake wheel from the windmill Olle Widde, Ten Post, Groningen was incorporated into the rebuild. The mill was officially opened on 8 September 2000 and named De Mars.

== Description ==
De Mars is what the Dutch describe as a "stellingmolen". It is a three-storey smock mill on a three-storey base. The stage is at third-floor level, 5.85 metres (19 ft 2 in) above ground level. The smock and cap are thatched. The mill is winded by tailpole and winch. The four Common sails, which have a span of 18.20 metres (59 ft 9 in), are carried in a cast-iron windshaft which was cast by Gieterij Hardinxveld in 1998. The mill drives a single pair of 1.30 metres (4 ft 3 in) diameter millstones.

== Millers ==
Reference :-

- Philips Schlecht (1834–65)
- Roelof Schlecht (1865-1948)

== Public access ==
De Mars is open on Fridays from 13.00 to 18.00, or when mill is turning and/or when the blue flag is out.
