= Menaam =

Menaldum Menaam
- Village
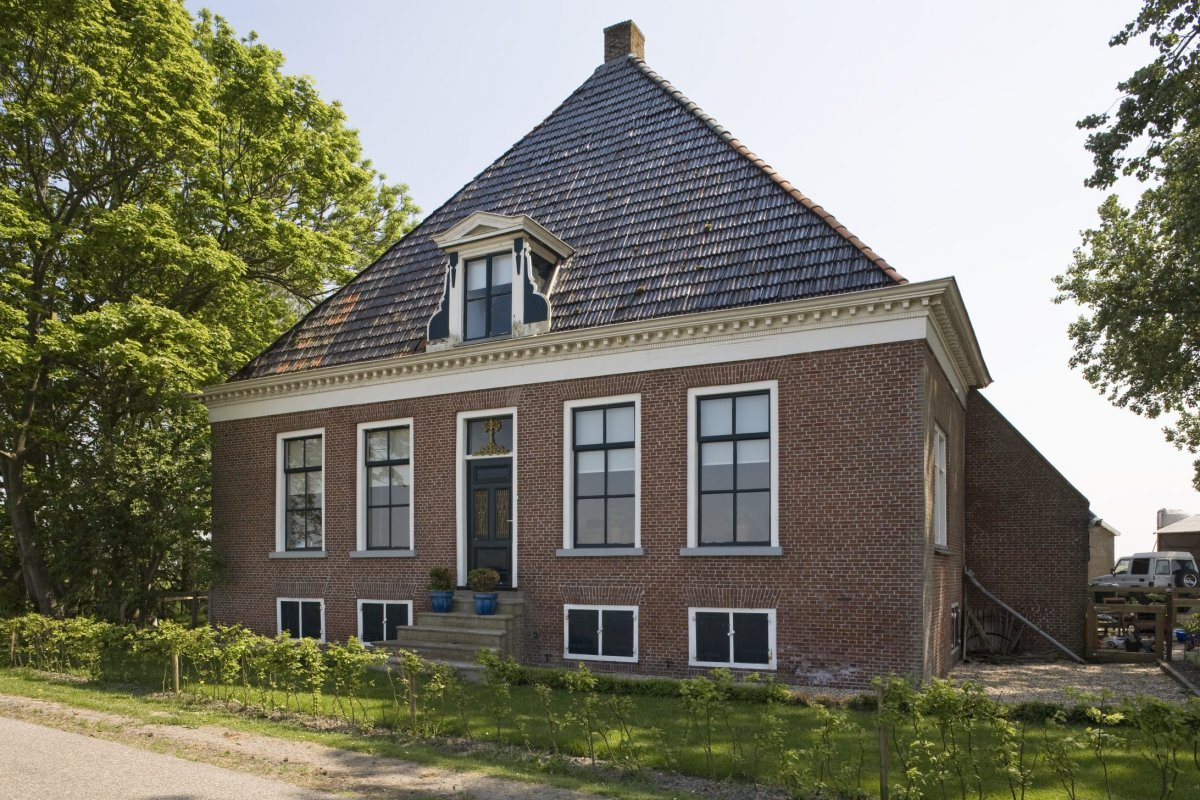

- Flag Coat of arms

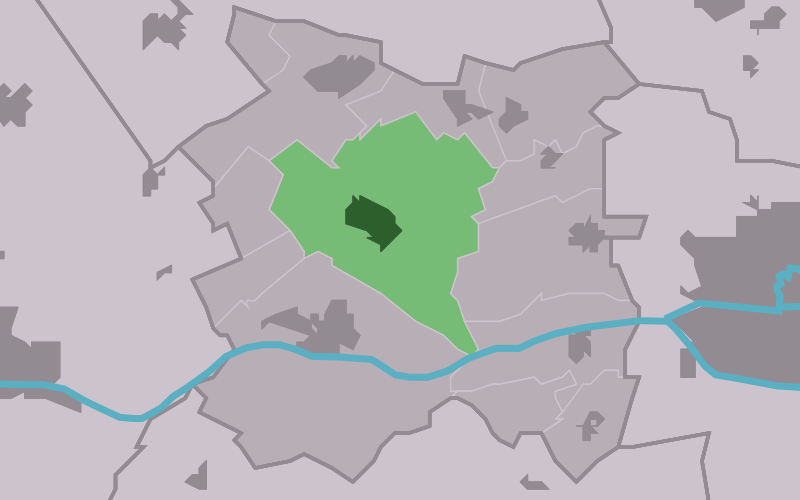
- Location in Menameradiel municipality

- Location in the Netherlands Menaldum (Netherlands)
- Country: Netherlands
- Province: Friesland
- Municipality: Waadhoeke

Area
  - Total: 13.58 km^{2} (5.24 sq mi)
- Elevation: 0.5 m (1.6 ft)

Population (2021)
  - Total: 2,665
  - Density: 196.2/km^{2} (508.3/sq mi)
- Time zone: UTC+1 (CET)
  - Summer (DST): UTC+2 (CEST)
- Postal code: 9036
- Dialing code: 0518
- Website: Official

Menaam (Dutch: Menaldum) is a village in Waadhoeke municipality in the province of Friesland, the Netherlands. It had a population of around 2,609 citizens in January 2017. Before 2018, the village was part of the Menameradiel municipality.

There are two windmills in the village, De Kievit and De Rentmeester.

== History ==
The village was first mentioned in the 13th century Menaldum, and means "settlement of Meynald (person)". Menaam is a terp (artificial living hill) village from several centuries before Christ. Menaam was the capital of the grietenij (forerunner of the municipality) Menaldumadeel.

The Dutch Reformed church is a successor of the medieval church which was built in stages using its predecessor. In 1855, the choir was rebuilt. The tower followed in 1866, and the nave was constructed in 1874.

The polder mill De Rentmeester was built in 1833 in Dronrijp. It had become obsolete and was moved to Menaam in 1981 to drain excess water from the Zuidoostpolder.

Menaam was home to 935 people in 1840. The town hall was built in 1843 as grietenij house in neoclassical style. At the end of the 19th century, large part of the terp were excavated. From the 1960s onwards, Menaam became a suburb of Leeuwarden. In 2018, the municipality Menameradiel was merged into Waadhoeke and Menaam ceased to be a capital.

== Notable people ==
- Sije Visser (born 1950), former professional footballer

== Gallery ==
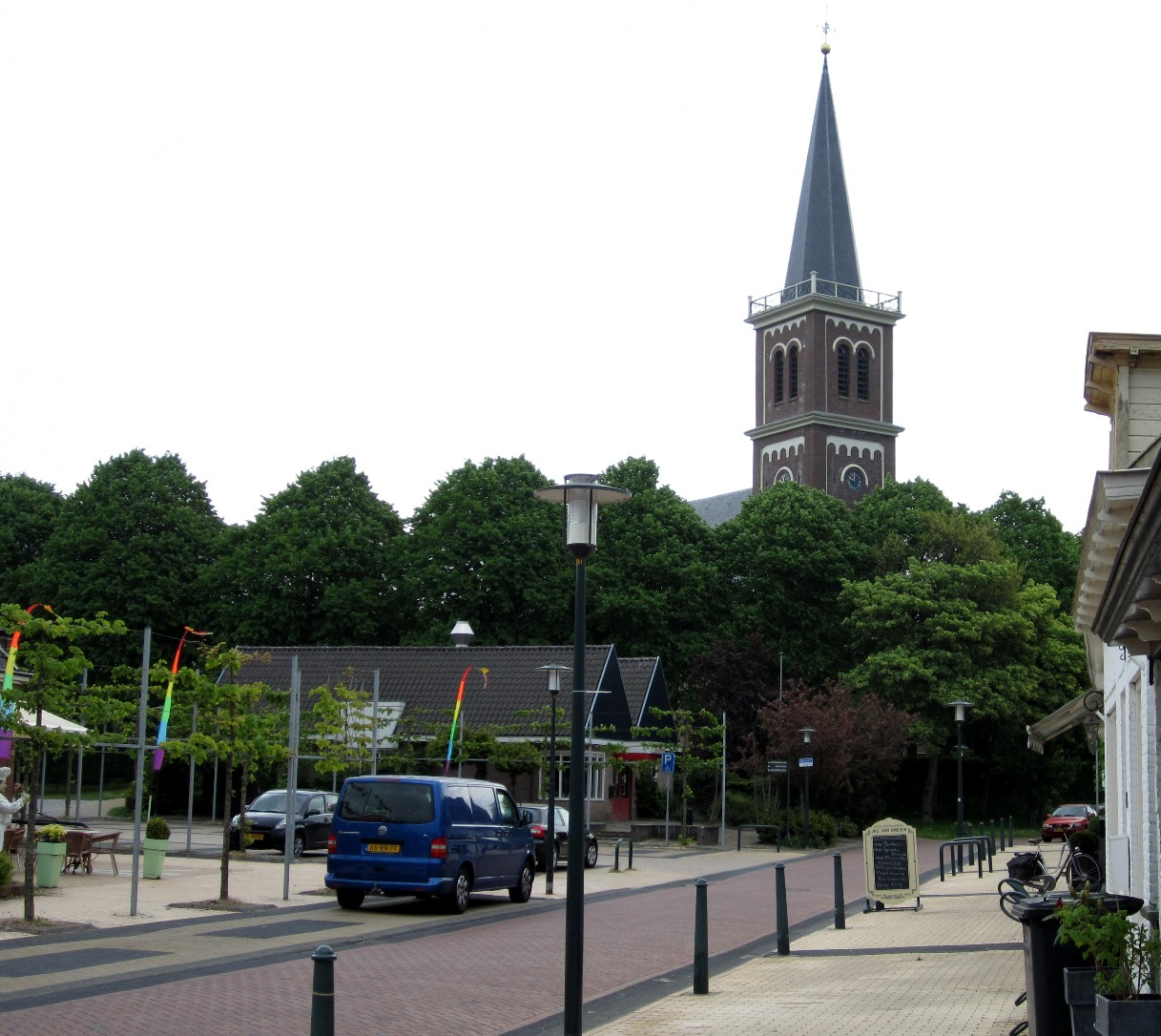
Street view

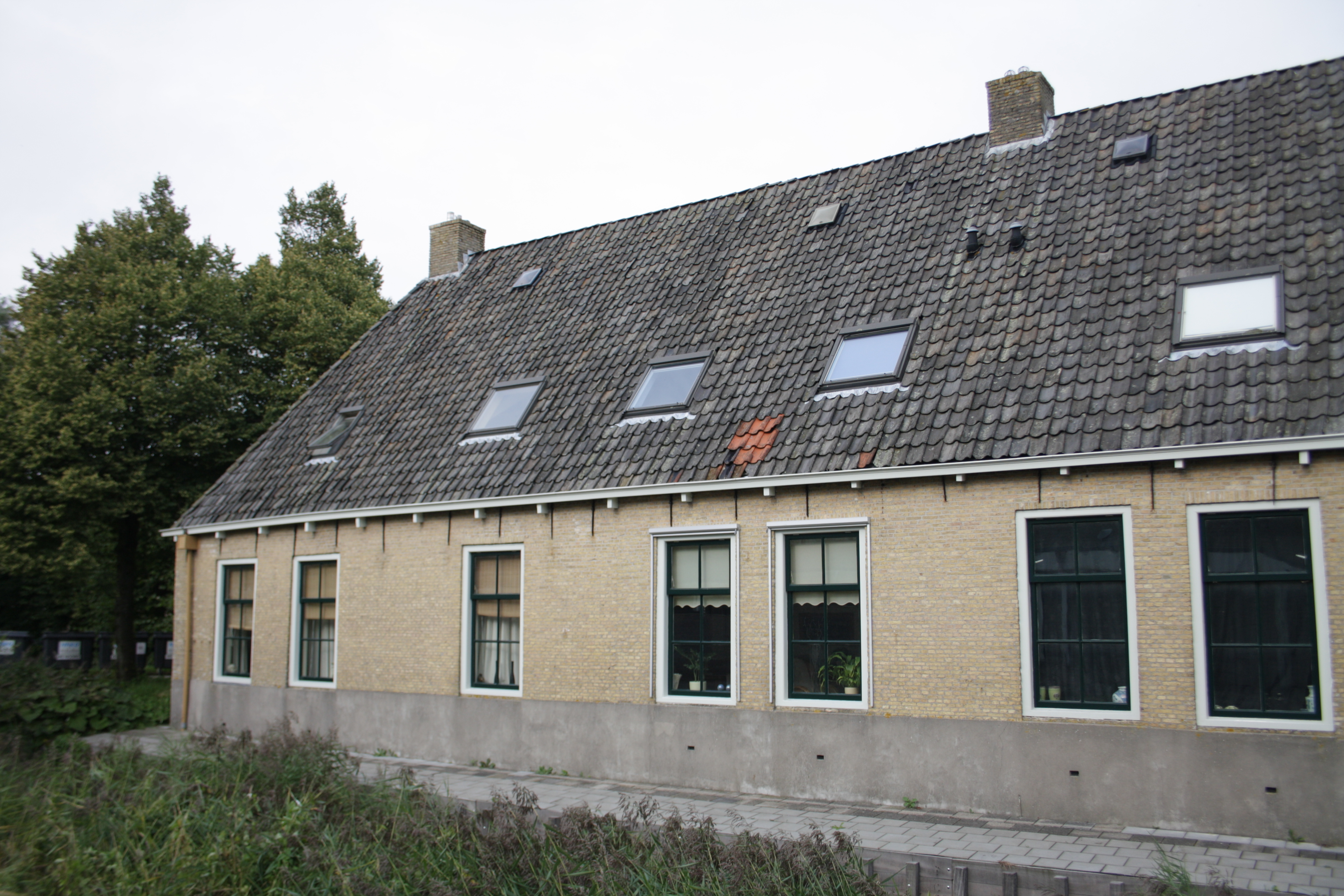
Former poorhouse

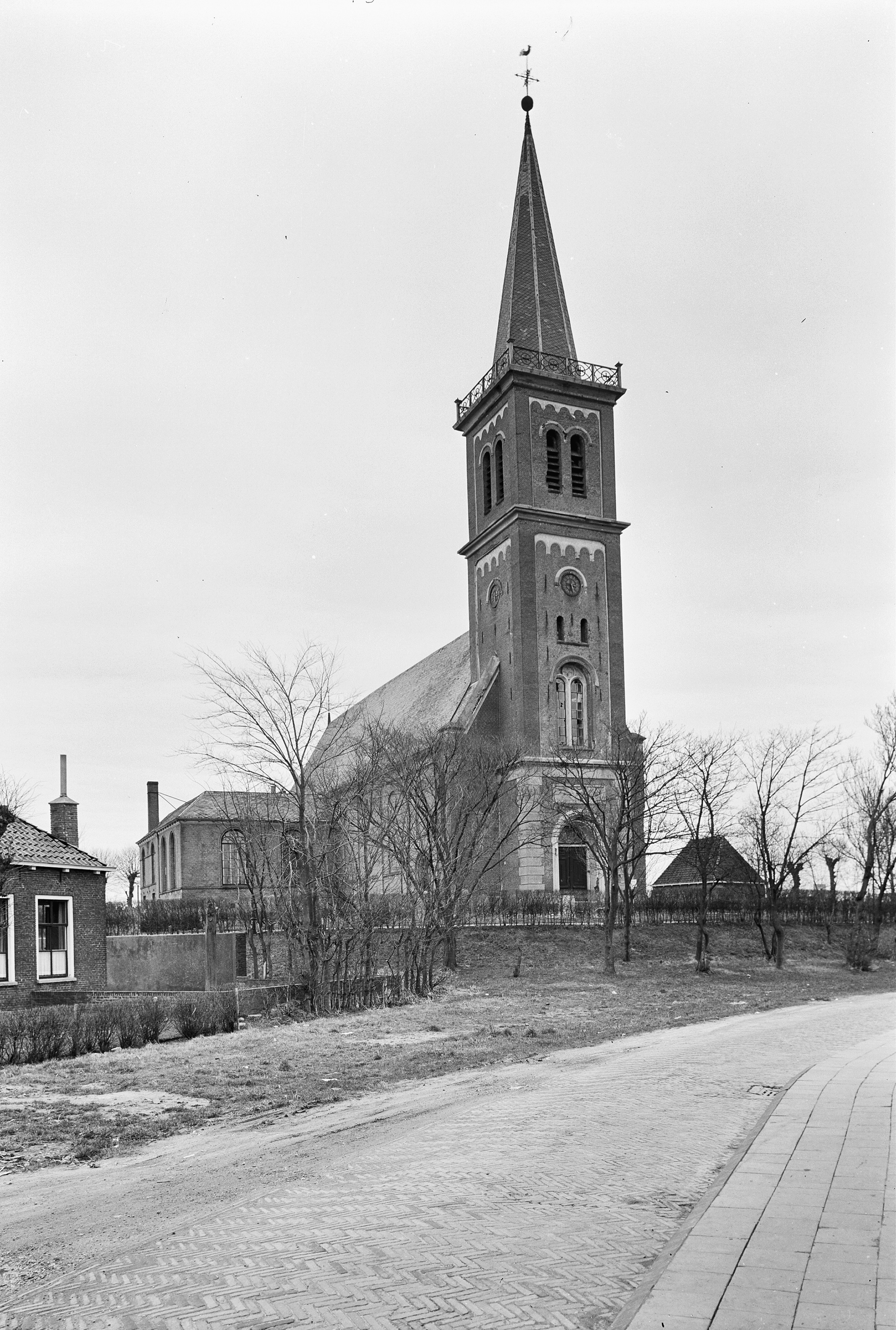
Church of Menaam

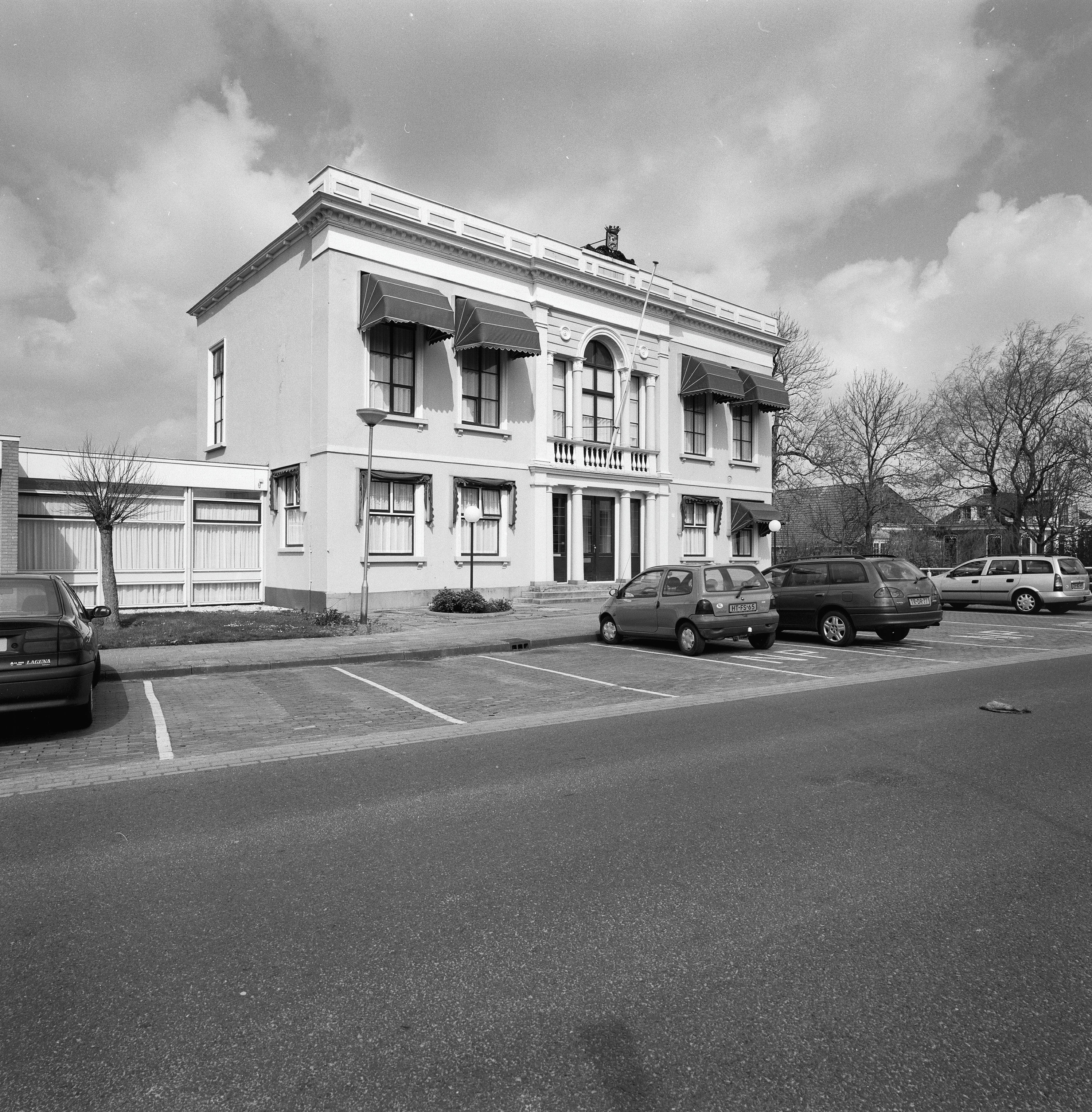
Former town hall
