= De Hoop, Dokkum =

Smock mill in Friesland, Netherlands

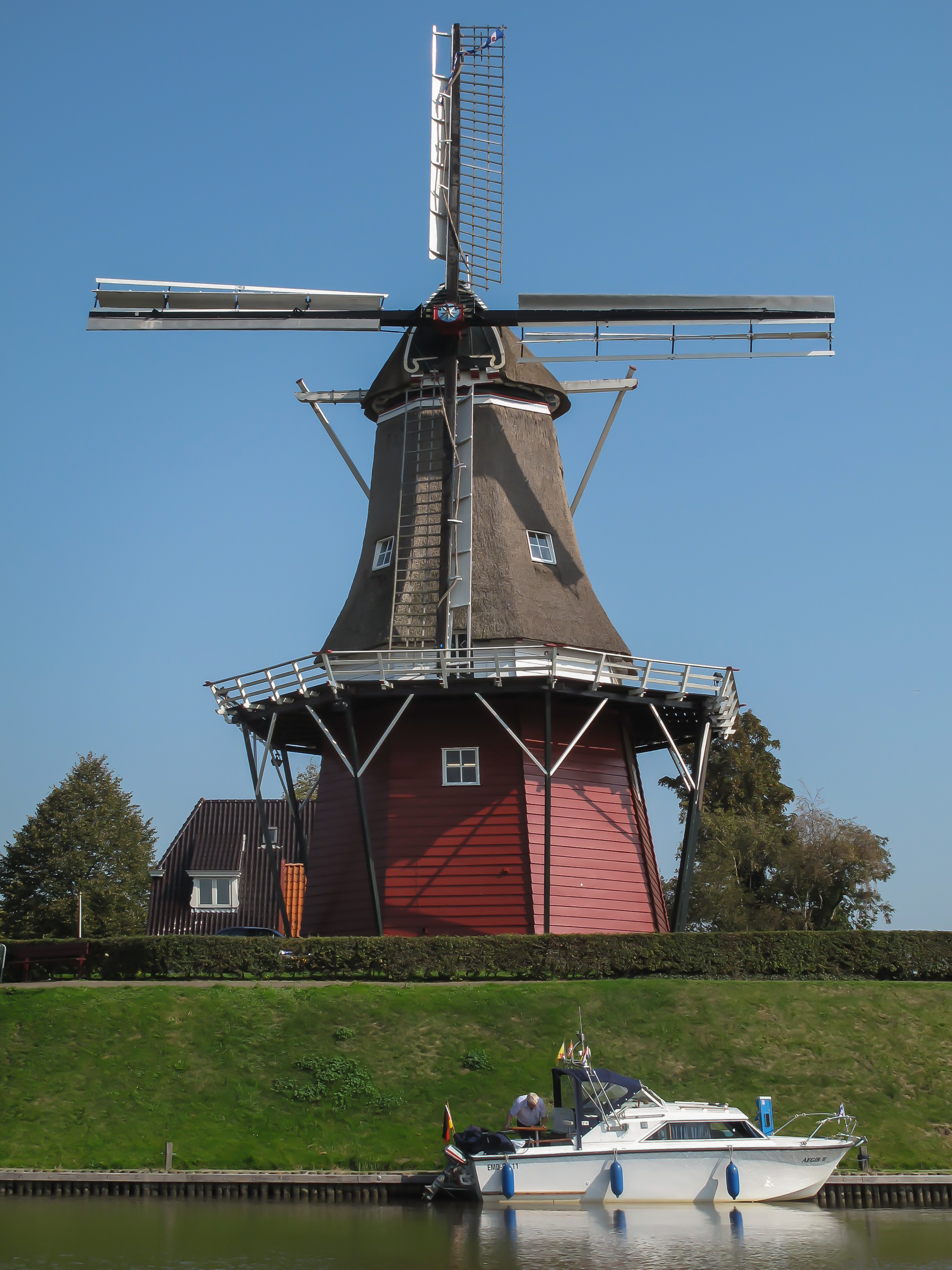
- De Hoop, September 2009

Origin
- Mill name: De Hoop; De Molen van Broekema
- Mill location: Zuiderbotwerk 2, 9101 NE, Dokkum
- Coordinates: 53°19′22″N 5°59′53″E
- Operator(s): Stichting Monumentenbehoud Dongeradeel
- Year built: 1849

Information
- Purpose: Corn mill, formerly also a barley mill
- Type: Smock mill
- Storeys: Three-storey smock
- Base storeys: Three-storey base
- Smock sides: Eight sides
- No. of sails: Four sails
- Type of sails: Two Common sails (Fok system on leading edges), two Ten Have sails, (Van Bussel system on leading edges).
- Windshaft: Cast iron
- Winding: Tailpole and winch
- No. of pairs of millstones: One pair
- Size of millstones: 1.40 metres (4 ft 7 in) diameter

De Hoop (English: The Hope) is a smock mill in Dokkum, Friesland, Netherlands which was built in 1849 and has been restored to working order. The mill is listed as a Rijksmonument, number 13186.

== History ==
De Hoop was built in 1849 On the site of the standerdmolen "De Grote Molen" (English The Great Mill), which had stood until 1840. The millwright was Gerrit P de Boer. The mill was a corn and barley mill. The successive owners of the mill were Dijkstra, Kint, Kiestra, Kloosterman and Banga. The mill was sold to Edo Broekema in 1924. Just after the end of the Second World War, the sails were made more efficient. One pair of Commons sails was fitted with streamlined leading edges. The other pair were replaced by Ten Have sails. In 1949, the winding mechanism from a corn mill in Uithoorn, North Holland was fitted. The mill was restored in 1965 by millwright Doornbosch of Adorp, Groningen. In 1967, the mill passed to Broekma's sons, Kor and Popke. Through this long ownership by the Broekema family, the mill was known locally as De molen van Broekema. In 1991, the mill was sold to the Gemeente Dongeradeel, who transferred it to the Stichting Monumentenbehoud Dongeradeel in 1994. In 1995, the cap and machinery were repaired by millwright Jellema of Birdaard in preparation for restoration to full working order, which was achieved in 1999.

== Description ==
De Hoop is what the Dutch describe as a "stellingmolen" . It is a three-storey smock mill on a three-storey base. The stage is at third-floor level, 7.44 metres (24 ft 5 in) above ground level. The smock and cap are feebly thatched. The mill is winded by tailpole and winch. The sails on the inner sailstock are Common sails, with leading edges streamlined on the Fok system. They have a span of 22.75 metres (74 ft 8 in). The sails on the outer sailstock are Ten Have sails, with leading edges fitted with aerofoils on the Van Bussel system. They have a span of 22.30 metres (73 ft 2 in). The sails are carried on a cast-iron windshaft, which was cast by A Sterkman en Zoon, The Hague. The windshaft also carries the brake wheel which has 63 cogs. This drives the wallower (32 cogs) at the top of the upright shaft. At the bottom of the upright shaft, the great spur wheel, which has 101 cogs, drives the lantern pinion stone nut, which has 25 staves. This drives the 1.40 metres (4 ft 7 in) diameter millstones.

== Millers ==
Reference :-

- Dijkstra
- Kwint
- Kiestra
- Kloosterman
- Banga ( -1924)
- Edo Broekema (1924–67)
- Kor Broekema (1967–91)
- Popke Broekeme (1967–91)

== Public access ==
De Hoop is open to the public by appointment.
