= Zeldenrust, Dokkum =

Windmill in Dokkum, Netherlands

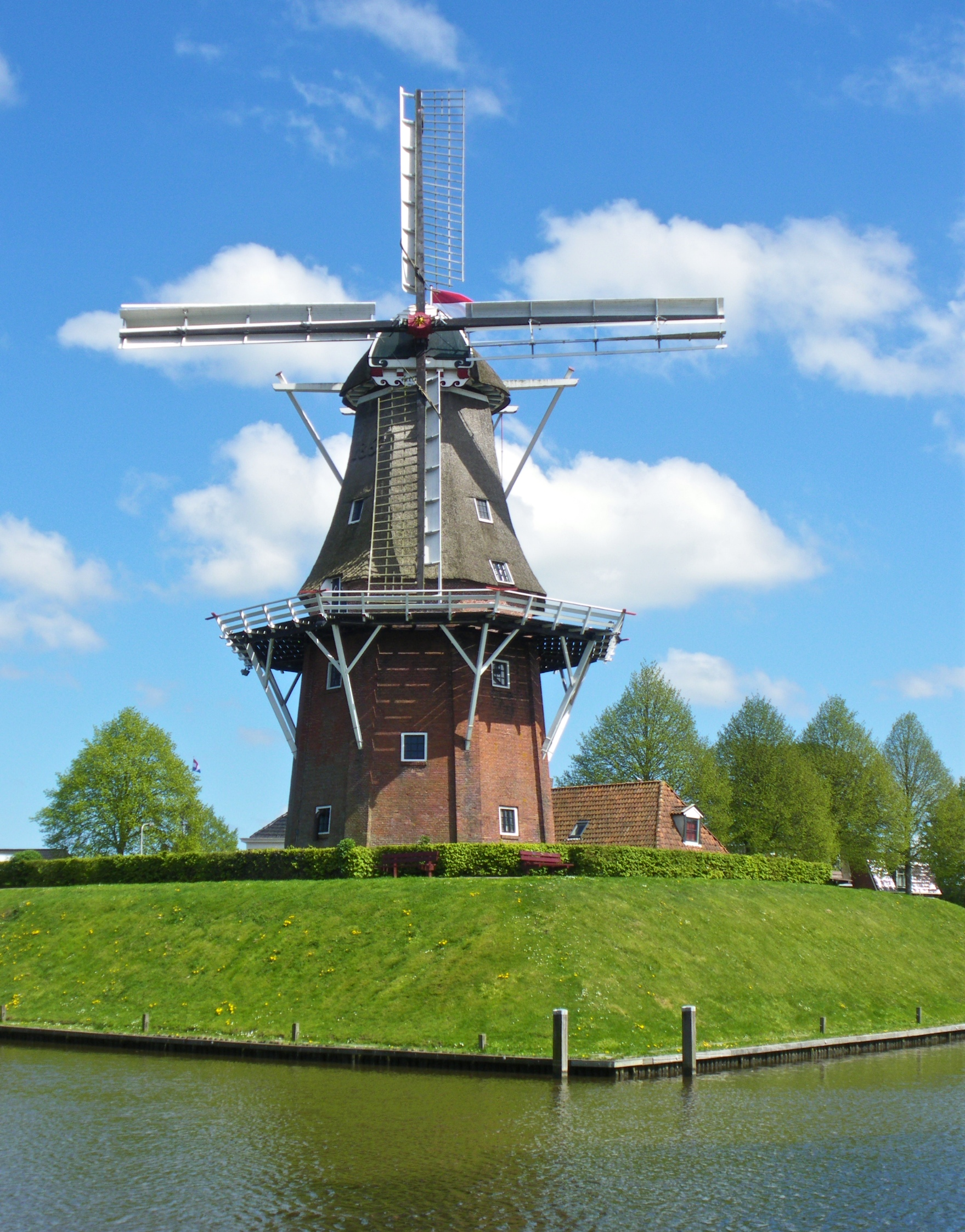
- Zeldenrust, May 2010

Origin
- Mill name: Zeldenrust
- Mill location: Baantjebolwerk 3, 9101 NH, Dokkum
- Coordinates: 53°19′28″N 5°59′40″E
- Operator(s): Stichting Monumentenbehoud Dongeradeel
- Year built: 1862

Information
- Purpose: Corn mill and barley mill
- Type: Smock mill
- Storeys: Three-storey smock
- Base storeys: Four-storey base
- Smock sides: Eight sides
- No. of sails: Four sails
- Type of sails: Two Common sails (Fok system on leading edges), two Ten Have sails, (Fok system on leading edges).
- Windshaft: Cast iron
- Winding: Tailpole and winch
- No. of pairs of millstones: Four pair
- Size of millstones: Wheat stones, both pairs 1.40 metres (4 ft 7 in) diameter Barley stones, one pair 1.62 metres (5 ft 4 in) diameter, one pair 1.64 metres (5 ft 5 in) diameter

Zeldenrust is a smock mill in Dokkum, Friesland, Netherlands which was built in 1862 and has been restored to working order. The mill is listed as a Rijksmonument, number 13097. The name translates as, "Seldom at rest."

== History ==
Zeldenrust was built in 1862 on the site of the Driepiepstermolen, which burnt down in 1861. The mill was built by millwright F van Delden of Olderker at a cost of ƒ9,400 for miller J M Bakker. In 1912, Bakker died at 81 and the business passed to his sons. In 1921, the mill was sold to Lukas Jan Graver, later passing to Jan Boomgaardt. In 1952, the mill was bought by Johan van Tilburg of Nieuw-Weerdinge, Drenthe. Tilburg fitted the mill with more efficient sails. He sold the mill in 1966 to the VVV at Dokkum. The mill was restored by millwright Doornbosch of Adorp, Groningen in 1968–69. A further restoration was carried out by millwright Jellema of Birdaard in 1995.

== Description ==
Zeldenrust is what the Dutch describe as a "stellingmolen" . It is a three-storey smock mill on a four-storey base. The stage is at third-floor level, 8.85 metres (29 ft 0 in) above ground level. The smock and cap are thatched. The mill is winded by tailpole and winch. The sails on the inner sailstock are Common sails, with leading edges streamlined on the Fok system. They have a span of 22.00 metres (72 ft 2 in). The sails on the outer sailstock are Ten Have sails, with leading edges fitted with aerofoils on the Fok system. They have a span of 22.00 metres (72 ft 2 in). The sails are carried on a cast-iron windshaft, which was cast by Prins van Oranje, The Hague in 1877. The windshaft also carries the brake wheel which has 63 cogs. This drives the wallower (32 cogs) at the top of the upright shaft. At the bottom of the upright shaft, the great spur wheel, which has 101 cogs. There are four pairs of millstones. One pair are French Burr stones, they are 1.40 metres (4 ft 7 in) diameter and are driven by a lantern pinion stone nut which has 27 staves. The second pair are Cullen stones, they are 1.40 metres (4 ft 7 in) diameter and are driven by a lantern pinion stone nut which has 28 staves. The third pair are used for producing pearl barley. They are 1.62 metres (5 ft 4 in) diameter and are driven by a lantern pinion stone nut which has 21 staves. The fourth pair are used for producing pearly barley. they are 1.64 metres (5 ft 5 in) diameter and are driven by a lantern pinion stone nut which has 23 staves.

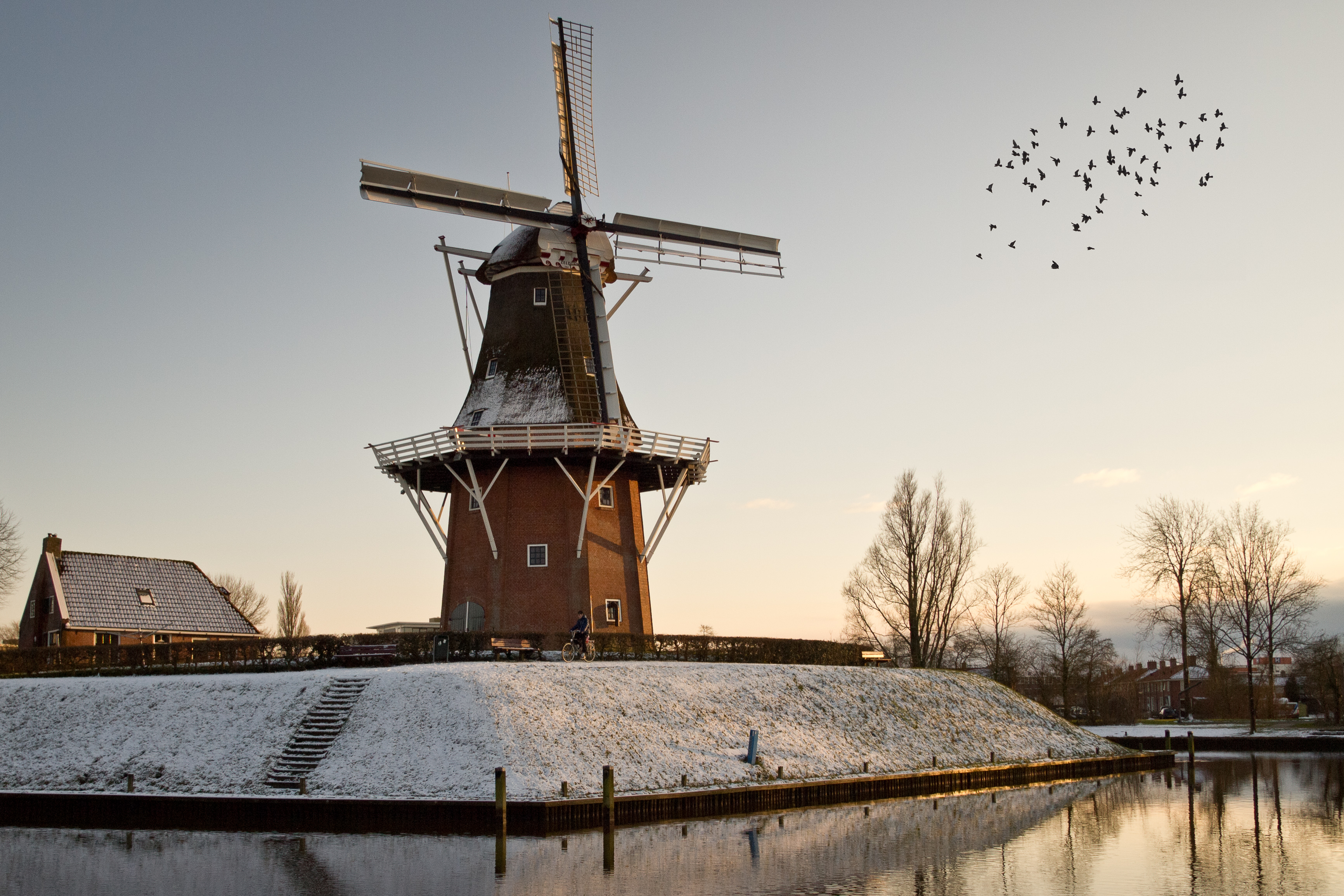
View on a winter afternoon

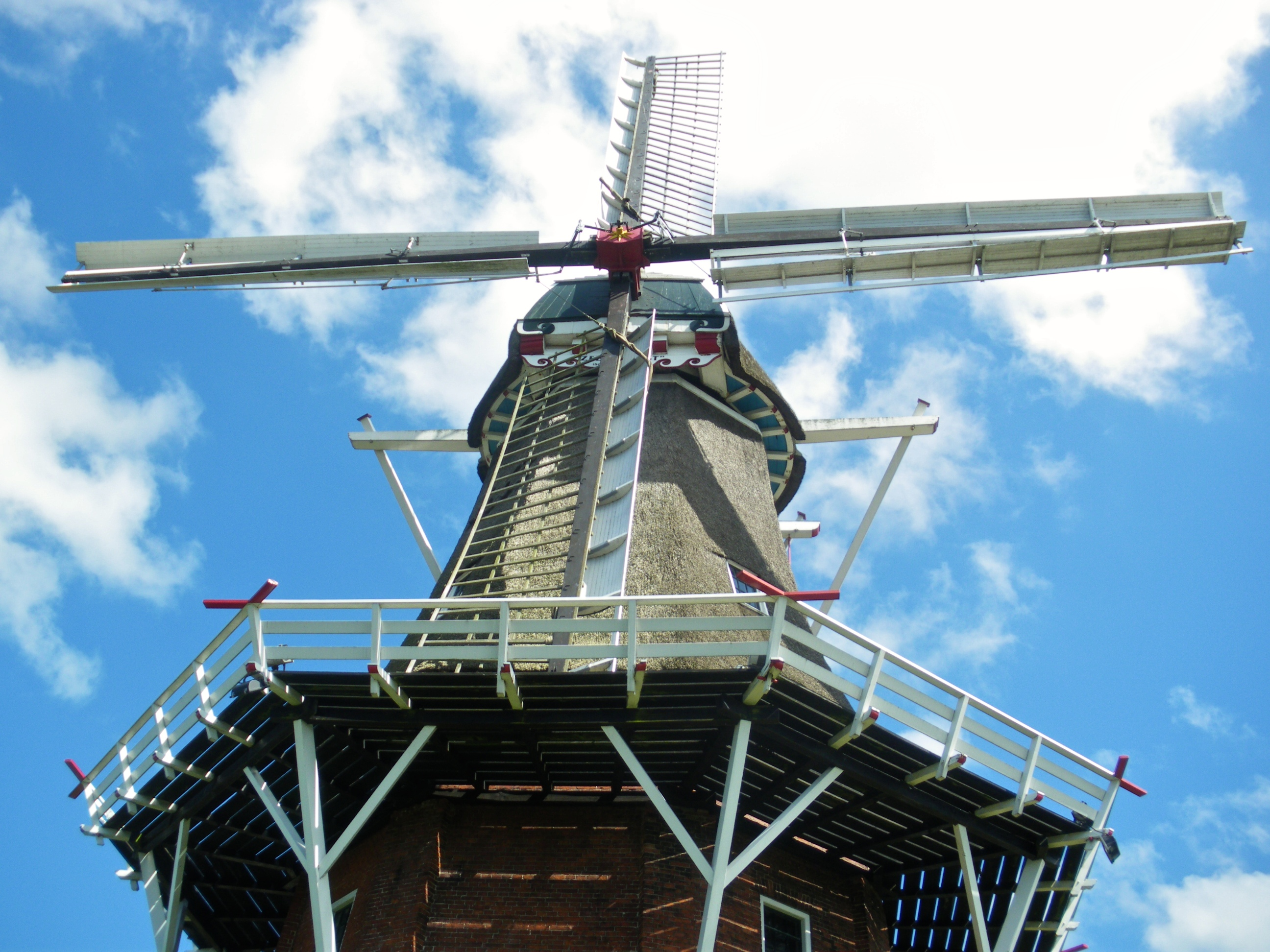
Sail close-up

== Millers ==
Reference :-

- J M Bakker (1862–1912)
- Bakker (1912–21)
- Lukas Jan Graver (1921– )
- Jan Boomgaardt ( –1952)
- Johan H A Tilburg (1952–66)

== Public access ==
Zeldenrust is open to the public by appointment.
