= Deinum =

- Village
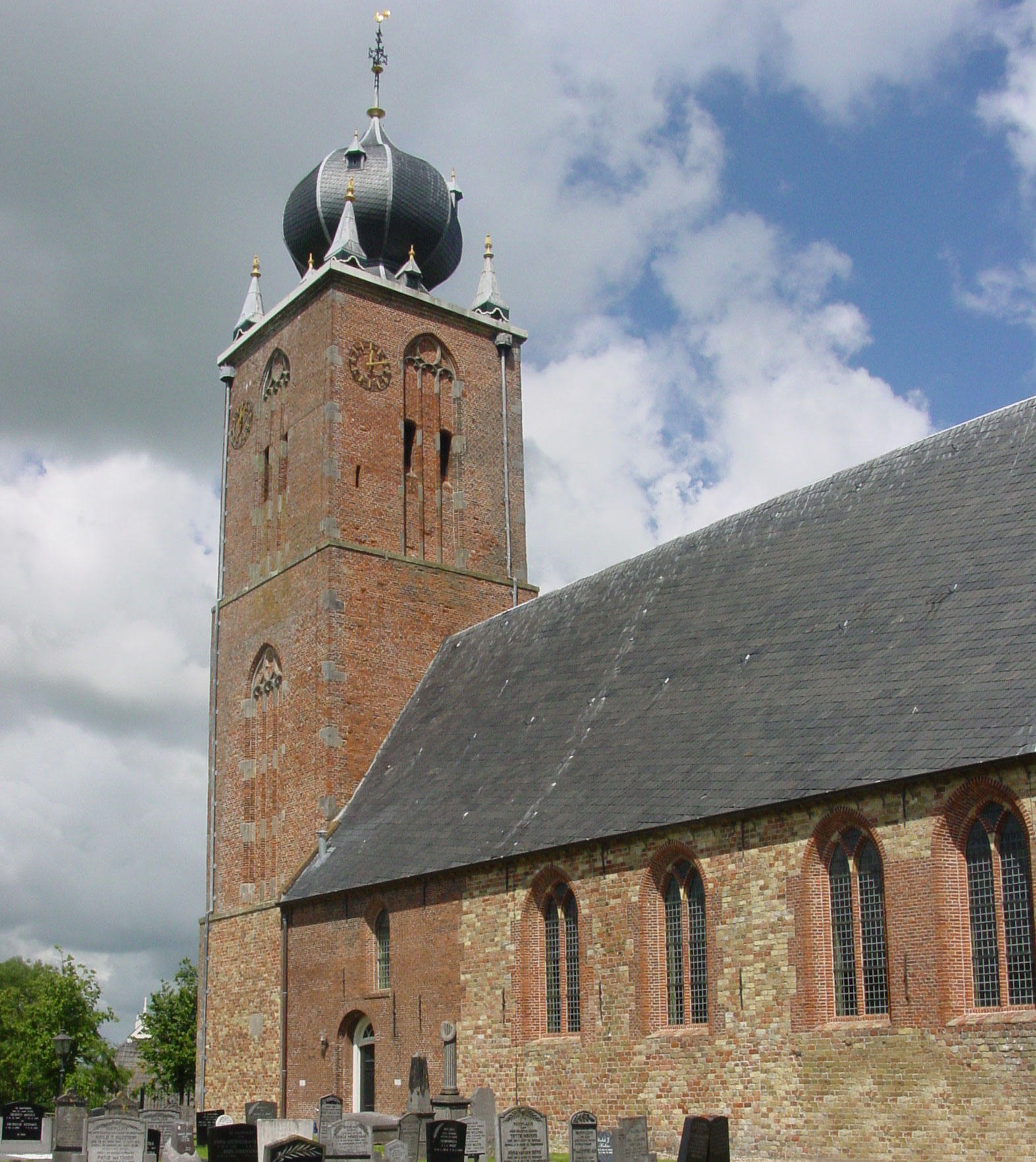
- Deinum church

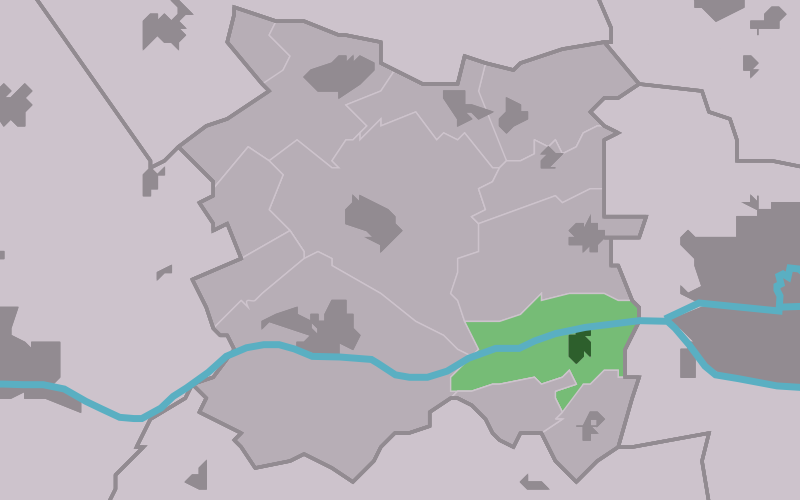
- Location in Menameradiel municipality

- Location in the Netherlands Deinum (Netherlands)
- Country: Netherlands
- Province: Friesland
- Municipality: Waadhoeke

Area
  - Total: 4.73 km^{2} (1.83 sq mi)
- Elevation: 0.7 m (2.3 ft)

Population (2021)
  - Total: 1,055
  - Density: 223/km^{2} (578/sq mi)
- Time zone: UTC+1 (CET)
  - Summer (DST): UTC+2 (CEST)
- Postal code: 9033
- Dialing code: 058
- Website: Official

Deinum (Dutch pronunciation: [ˈdɛinʏm]) is a village in Waadhoeke municipality in Friesland, The Netherlands. Before 2018, the village was part of the Menameradiel municipality.

== Population ==
In 2017 Deinum had a total of 915 residents, of which 508 male and 482 female. The amount of non-western immigrants was 1% or less.

=== Ages ===
The largest age group in Deinum was between 45 and 65 years old, taking up 33% of the total population.

Age group	Percentage
0-15	23%
15-25	11%
25-45	22%
45-65	33%
65+	11%

=== Households ===
Deinum had a total of 345 households, of which 46% had children and 54% had not. The average size of a household was 2.6 persons.

== Notable buildings ==
- The Protestant church of Deinum

== Transportation ==
- Deinum railway station
- Leeuwarden vrij-baan

== Gallery ==
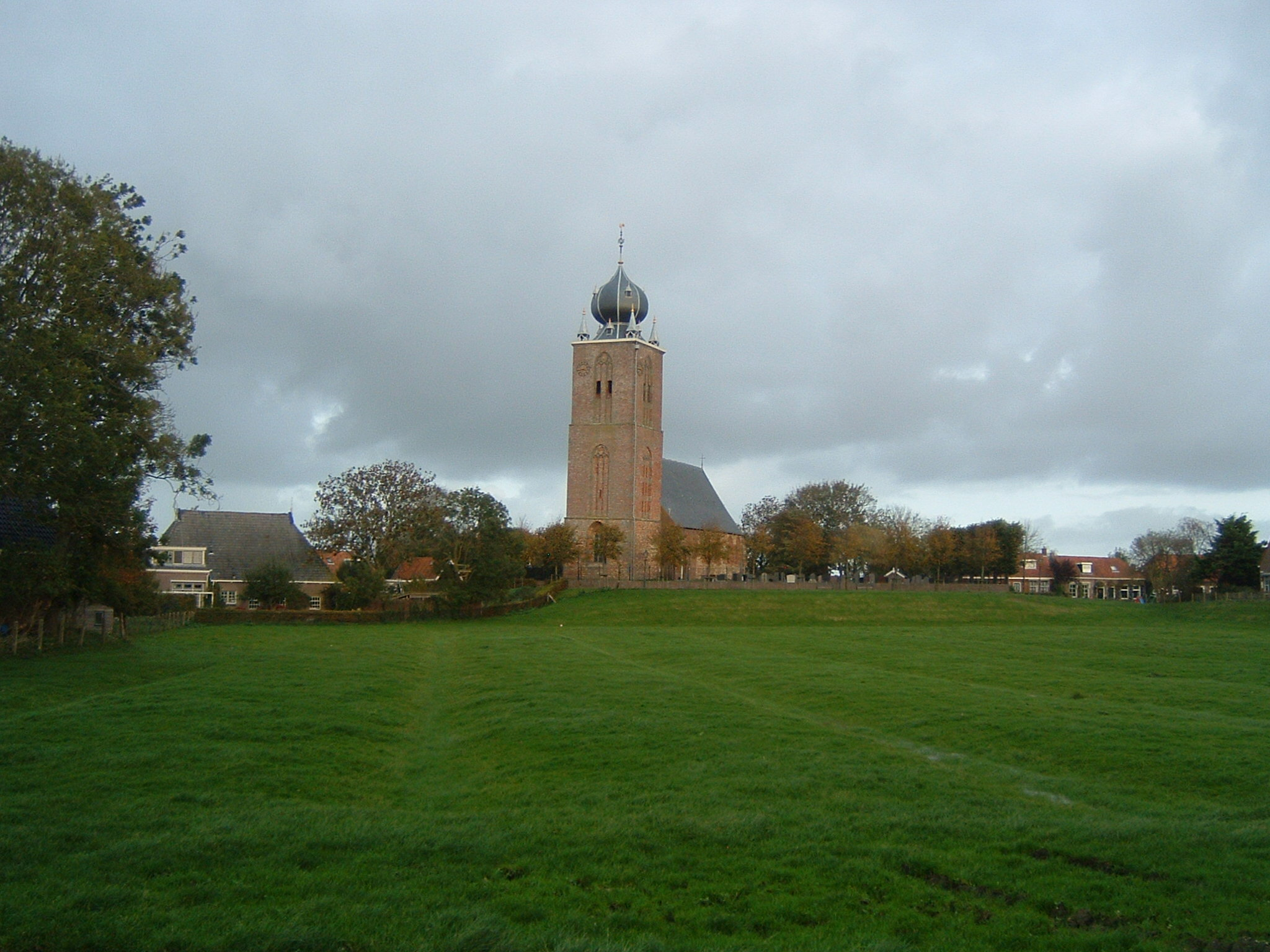
View on Deinum

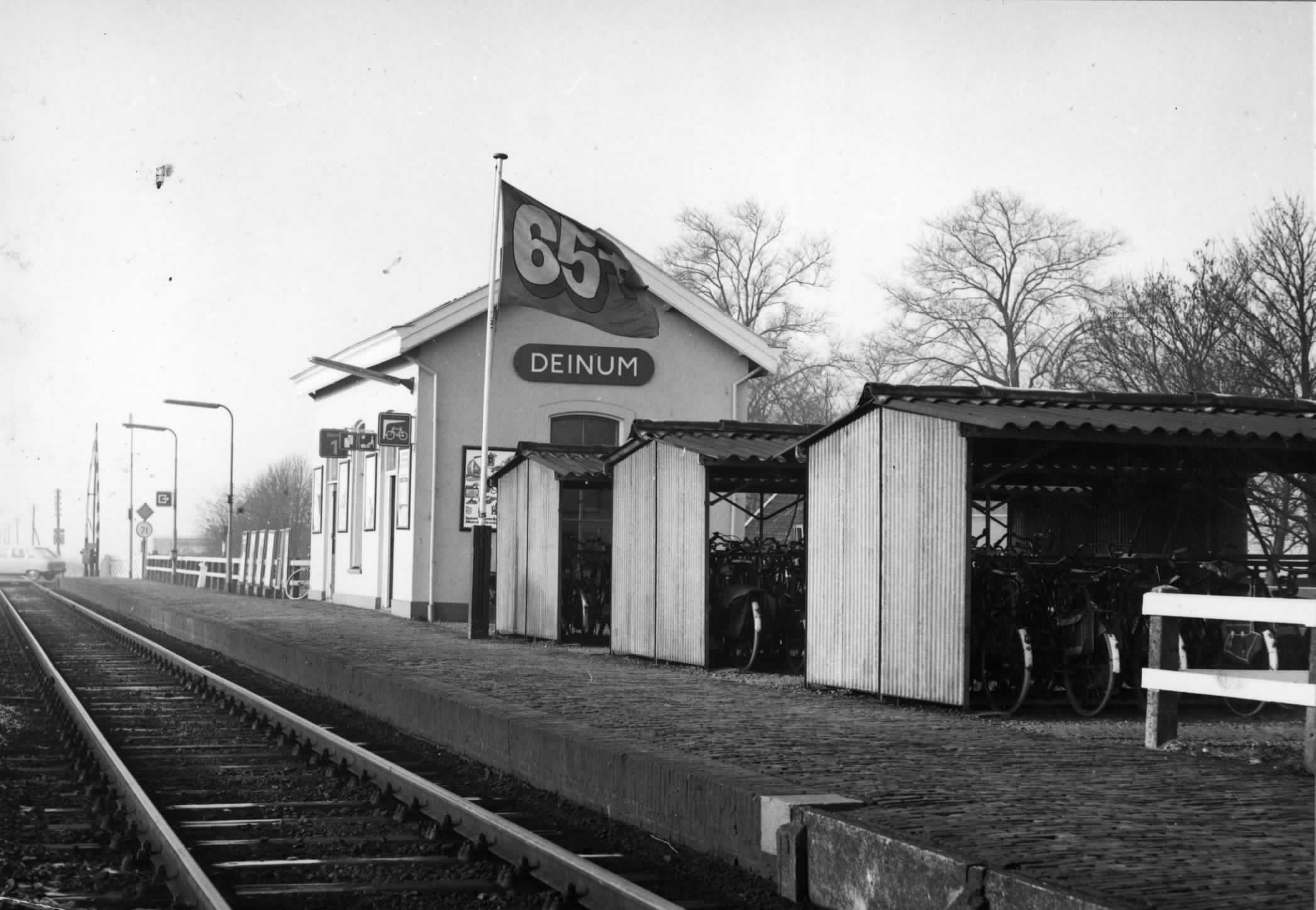
Former railway station building
