= De Mearmin =

Smock mill in Friesland, Netherlands

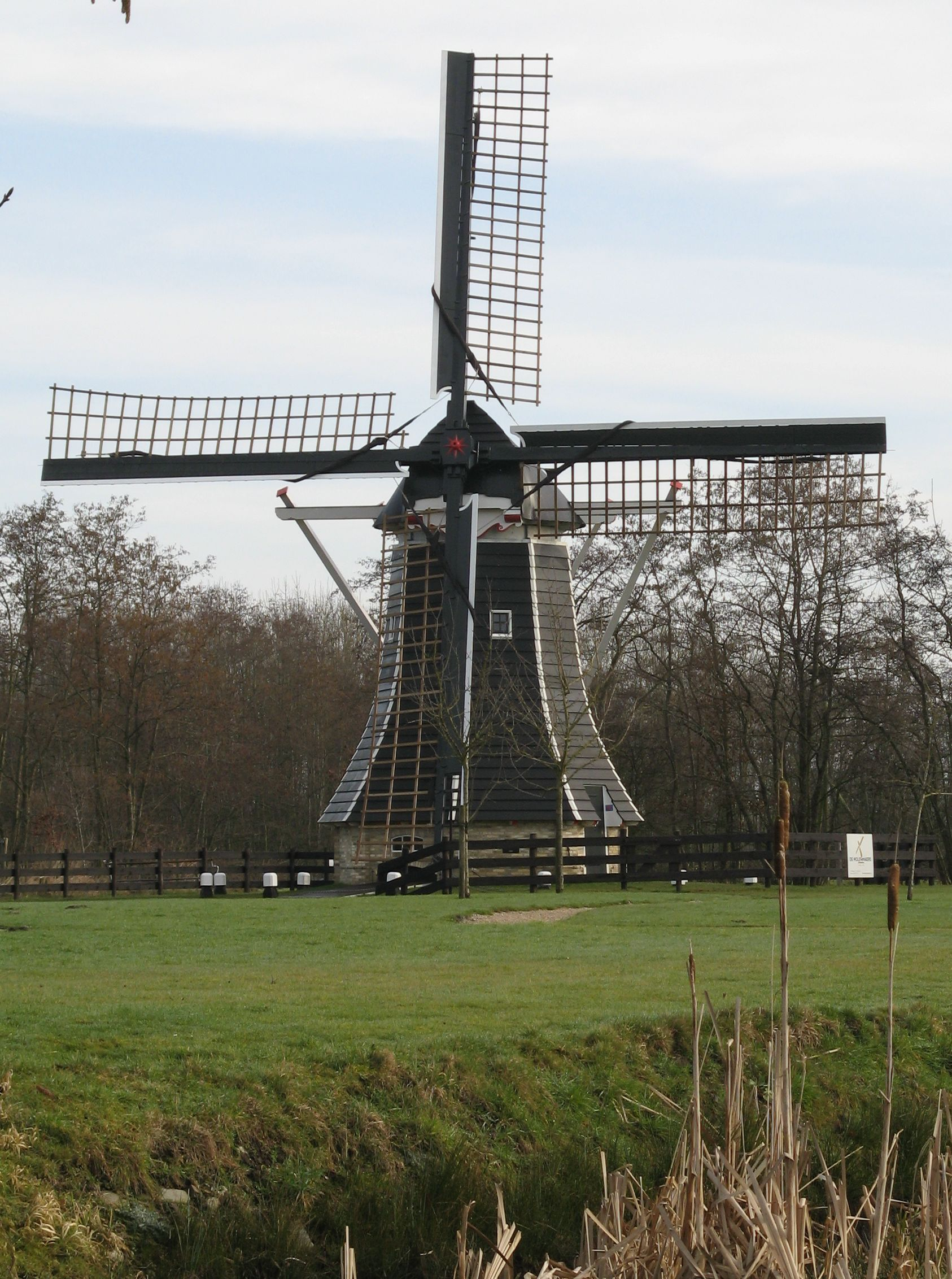
- De Mearmin, March 2017
- Interactive map of De Mearmin

Origin
- Mill name: De Mearmin
- Coordinates: 53°17′38″N 6°00′42″E
- Operator: Stichting De Sûkerei
- Year built: 2016

Information
- Purpose: Drainage mill
- Type: Smock mill
- Storeys: Two-storey smock
- Base storeys: One-storey base
- Smock sides: Eight sides
- No. of sails: Four sails
- Type of sails: Common sails
- Windshaft: Cast iron
- Winding: Tailpole and winch
- Type of pump: Archimedes' screw

De Mearmin, formerly also known as Geestermermeermolen, is a smock mill in Damwâld, Friesland, Netherlands, which was built in 1968 at Dokkum. The mill is listed as a Rijksmonument, number 467708. Between 2014 and 2016, the mill was dismantled, restored and moved to a new site in Damwâld.

== History ==
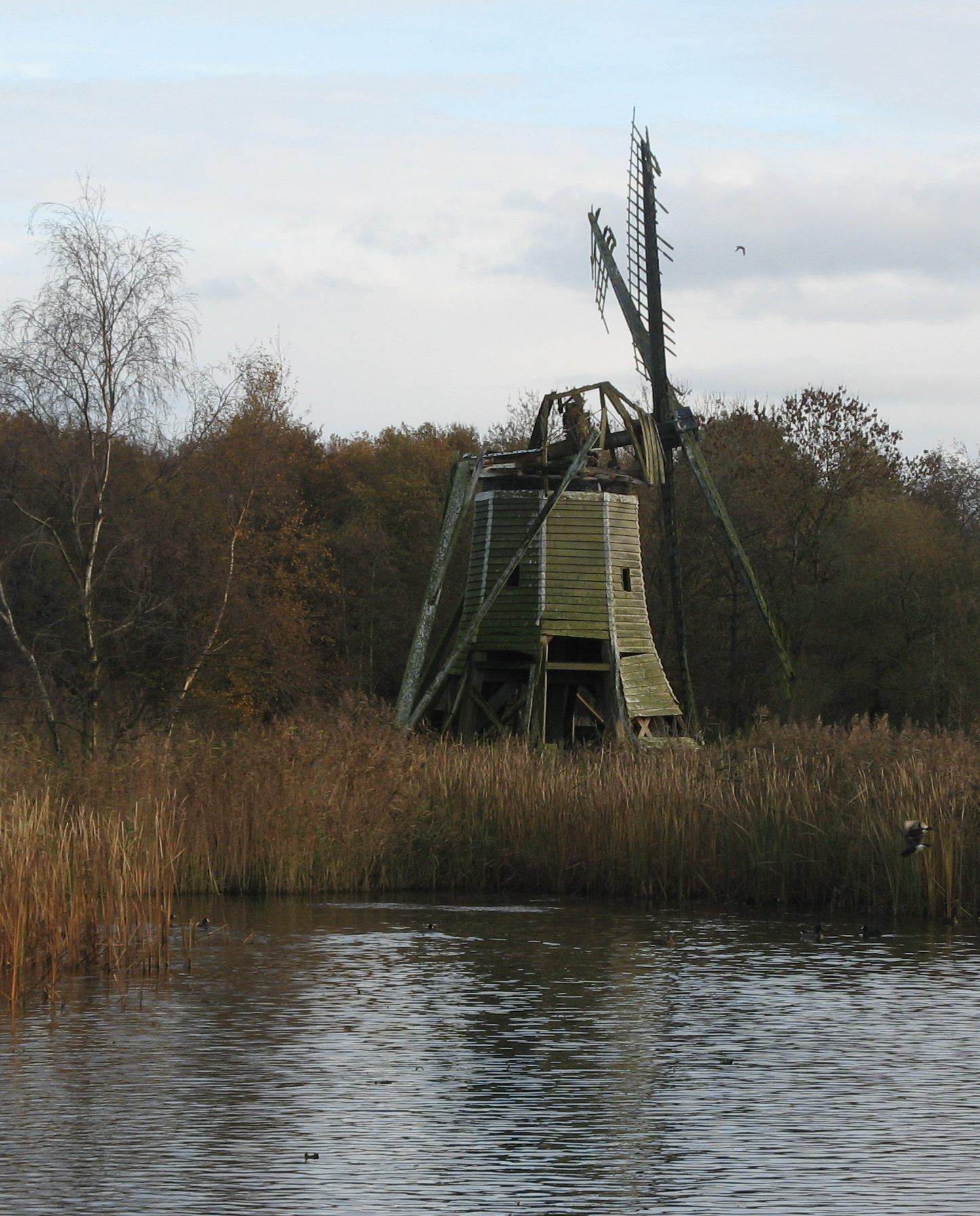
The windmill at its former site in 2010

The Mearmin was built between 1968 and 1970 by millwright Auke de Roos of Leeuwarden for the former owner Pier Prins in a privately owned little nature reserve called Geestmermeer. It incorporated parts of a drainage mill which stood at Readtsjerk, and also parts from various other demolished mills in Friesland. The windmill received monument status because of these historic parts in 1990, but only after a lengthy dispute. In later years, the windmill fell into disrepair. It was in a derelict condition by 2009 and under threat of disappearing completely. However, in March 2014 the mill was moved to the workshop of Hiemstra millwrights to be restored to working order. After restoration it was rebuilt at De Sûkerei open-air museum in Damwâld.

== Description ==
De Mearmin is what the Dutch describe as a "grondzeiler" . It is a two-storey smock mill on a single-storey base. There is no stage, the sail reaching almost to the ground. The smock and cap boarded. The mill is winded by tailpole and winch. The sails are Common sails. They have a span of 15.20 metres (49 ft 10 in). The sails are carried on a cast-iron windshaft, which was cast by Koning of Foxham, Groningen in 1903. The windshaft also carries the brake wheel which has 50 cogs. This drives the wallower (29 cogs) at the top of the upright shaft. At the bottom of the upright shaft, the crown wheel, which has 37 cogs drives a gearwheel with 34 cogs on the axle of the Archimedes' screw. The wooden screw has a 1.17 metres (3 ft 10 in) diameter.

== Public Access ==
The windmill is part of an open-air museum "De Sûkerei" and can be visited during opening hours of the museum.
