= De Rentmeester, Menaam =

Smock mill in Menaam, Friesland, Netherlands

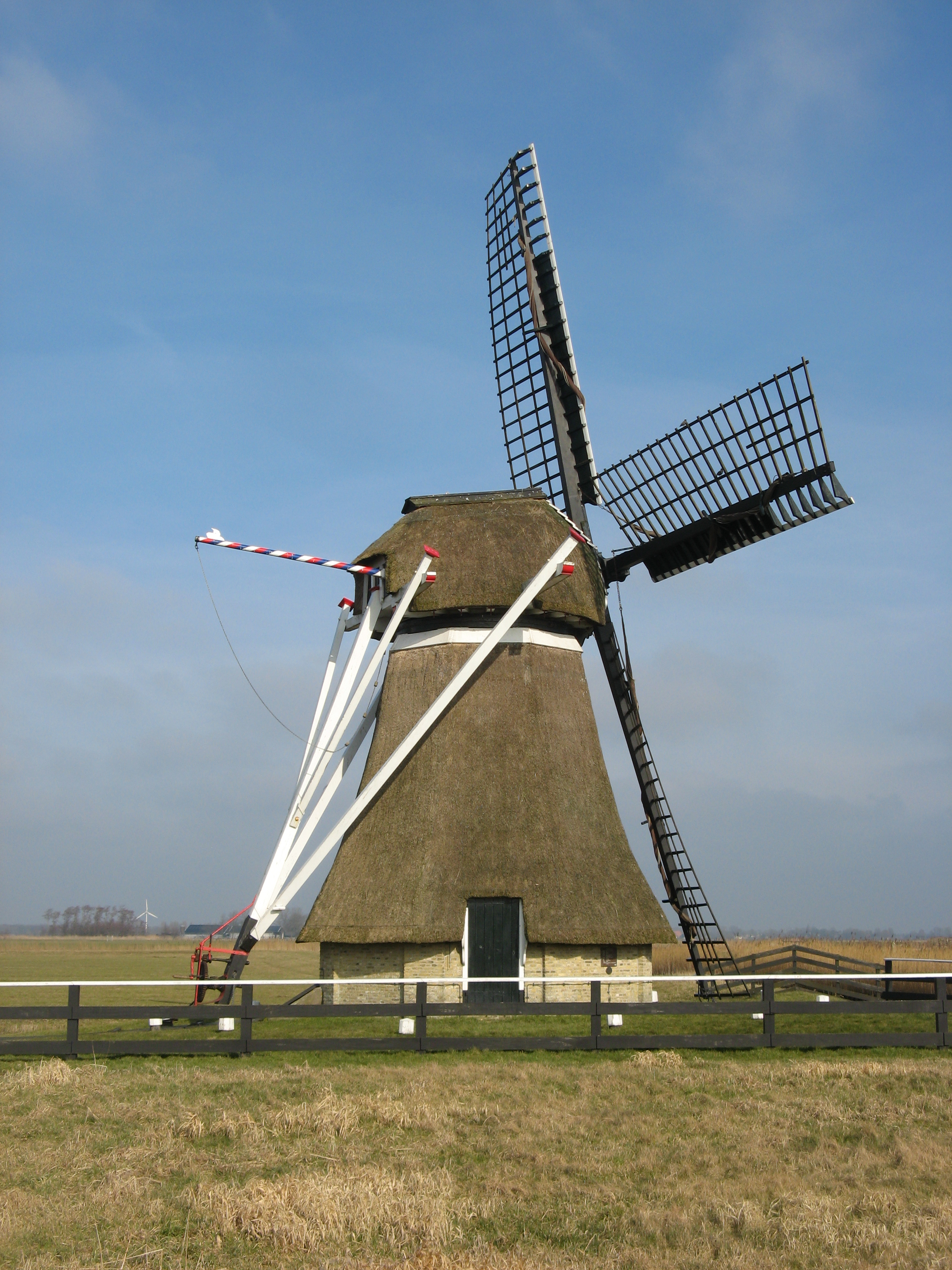
- De Rentmeester, February 2013.

Origin
- Mill name: De Rentmeester
- Mill location: Mieddyk 41, 9036 LC Menaam
- Coordinates: 53°12′33″N 5°40′37″E
- Operator(s): Stichting Molens in Menameradiel
- Year built: 1982

Information
- Purpose: Drainage mill
- Type: Smock mill
- Storeys: Two storey smock
- Base storeys: Single storey base
- Smock sides: Eight sides
- No. of sails: Four sails
- Type of sails: Common sails
- Windshaft: Cast iron
- Winding: Tailpole and winch
- Type of pump: Archimedes screw

De Rentmeester (English: The Steward) is a smock mill in Menaam, Friesland, Netherlands which was built in Dronryp in 1857 and moved to a new site at Menaldum in 1982, replacing a mill that had burnt down. The mill has been restored to working order. It is listed as a Rijksmonument.

== History ==
The mill was built in 1857 to drain the 135-hectare (330-acre) Noorderpolder at Dronryp. A mill had previously been built on that site in 1833. For many years, a diesel engine located in the mill had worked the Archimedes' screw. In later years, the mill stood derelict.

The original mill on the site now occupied by De Rentmeester was De Kooi (English: The Cow). It was built in 1833 to drain the 365-hectare (900-acre) Zuidoosterderpolder. The mill burnt down on 25 March 1969. The mill was moved here in 1981 by millwright Tacoma of Stiens. The mill's restoration was celebrated with an official opening ceremony on 29 October 1982. A further restoration took place in 1995. The name De Rentmeester was given to the mill at its new location. A new Archimedes' screw was fitted on 1 May 2012. On 23 February 2013, a bolt in the brake broke, and the mill was nearly set on fire by friction between the brake and brake wheel.

The mill is owned by the Stichting Molens in Menaldumadeel. The mill is listed as a Rijksmonument, number 28611.

== Description ==
De Rentmeester is what the Dutch describe as a grondzeiler. It is a two-storey smock mill on a single-storey brick base. There is no stage, the sails reaching almost to ground level. The mill is winded by a tailpole and a winch. The smock and cap are thatched. The sails are common sails. They have a span of 15.00 metres (49 ft 3 in). The sails are carried on a cast-iron windshaft, which was cast by Gietijzer H. J. Koning of Foxham, Groningen in 1907. It also carries the brake wheel, which has 47 cogs. This drives the wallower (24 cogs) at the top of the upright shaft. At the bottom of the upright shaft, there are two crown wheels The upper crown wheel, which has 31 cogs, drives an Archimedes' screw via a crown wheel. The lower crown wheel, which has 32 cogs, is carried on the axle of an Archimedes' screw, which was used to drain the polder. The axle of the screw is 30 centimetres (1 ft 0 in) diameter and 5.25 metres (17 ft 3 in) long. The screw is 1.27 metres (4 ft 2 in) in diameter. It is inclined at 26°. Each revolution of the screw lifts 424 litres (93 imp gal) of water.

== Public access ==
De Rentmeester is open to the public by appointment.
