= De Blesse =

- Village
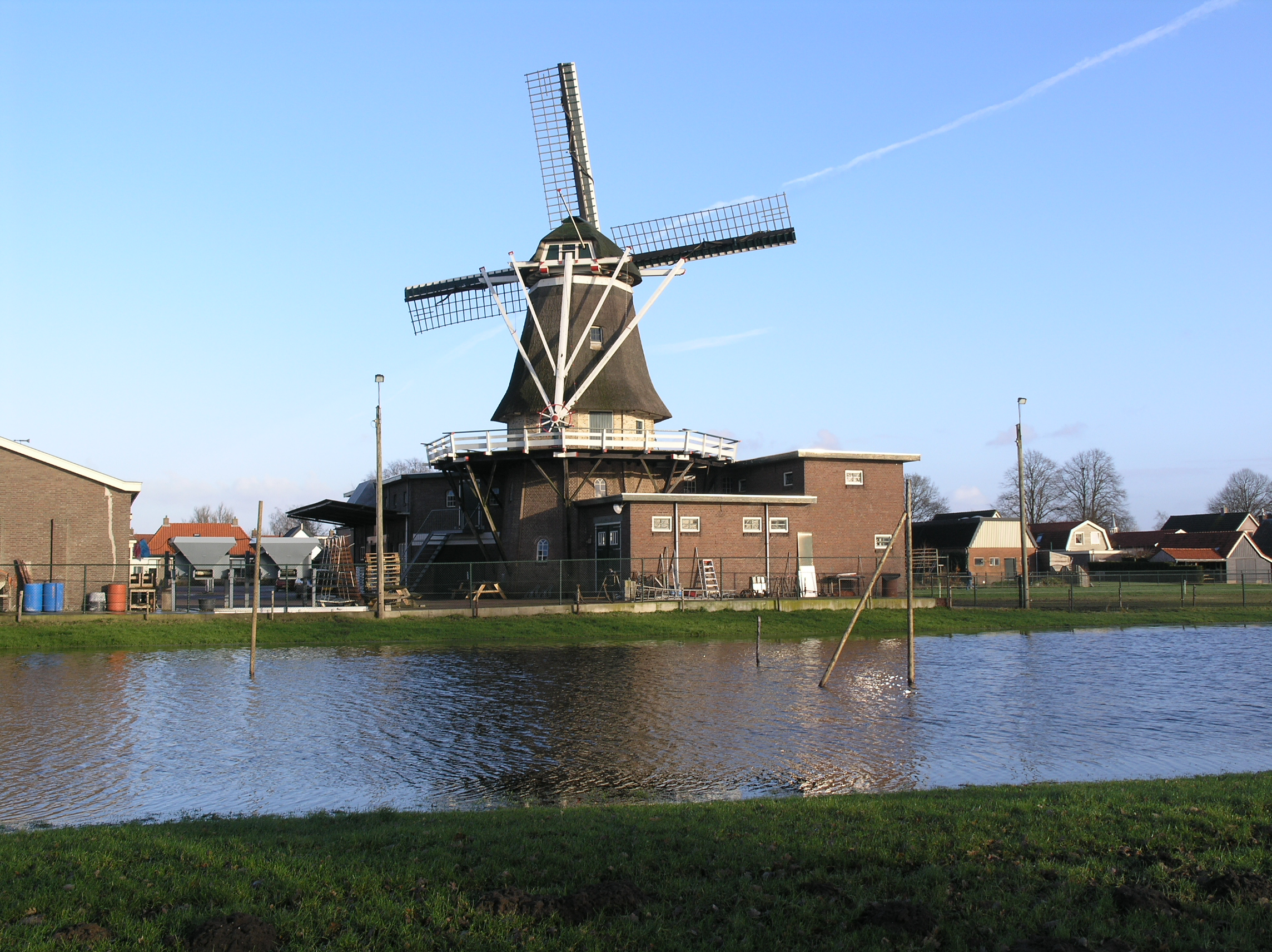
- De Mars Windmill

- Flag

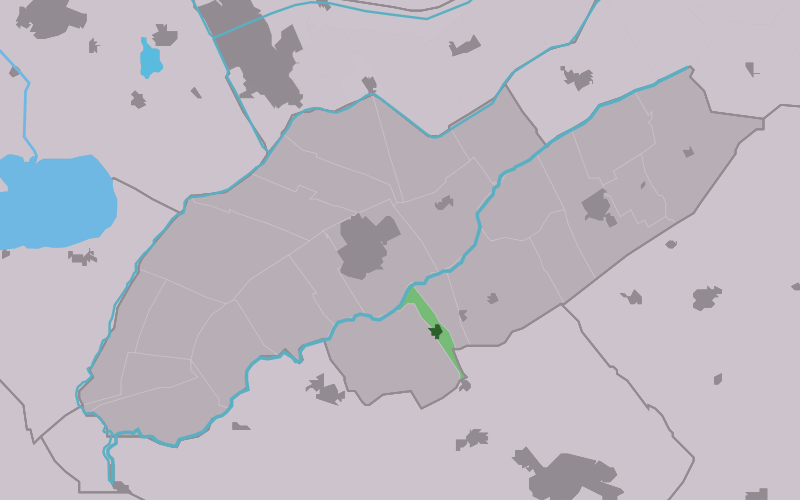
- Location in Weststellingwerf municipality

- Location in the Netherlands De Blesse (Netherlands)
- Country: Netherlands
- Province: Friesland
- Municipality: Weststellingwerf

Area
  - Total: 2.25 km^{2} (0.87 sq mi)
- Elevation: 7 m (23 ft)

Population (2021)
  - Total: 815
  - Density: 362/km^{2} (938/sq mi)
- Time zone: UTC+1 (CET)
  - Summer (DST): UTC+2 (CEST)
- Postal code: 8397
- Dialing code: 0561

De Blesse (or Blesse) is a village in Weststellingwerf in the province of Friesland, the Netherlands. It had a population of around 800 in 2017. Its windmill, De Mars, was rebuilt in 1997. Before 1956, the village was called Blesse.

== History ==
The village was first mentioned in 1439 as ter Blesse, and means "bare spot".

The Blesbroggeschaans is a sconce built in 1583 along the main road of Friesland to Overijssel. In 1672 and 1673, it was besieged by Christoph Bernhard von Galen, the Prince-bishop of Münster, but did not get taken. The Dutch Reformed chapel dates from 1880.

The grist mill De Mars was built in 1834. In the 1910s, an electro motor was installed and in 1958, the top of the windmill was demolished. In 1999, De Mars was restored and is frequently in commission. De Blesse was home to 160 people in 1840.

== Gallery ==
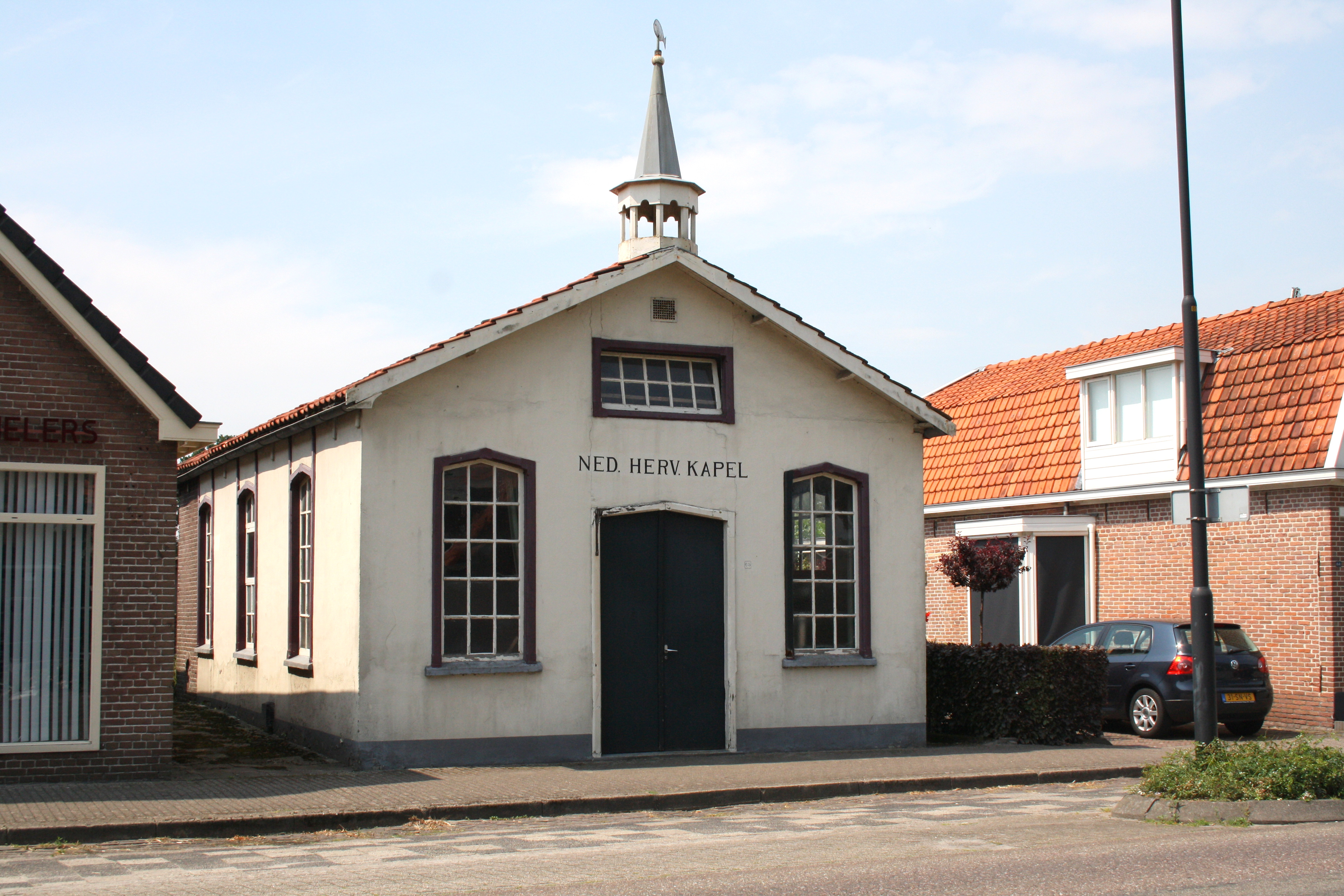
Chapel in De Blesse

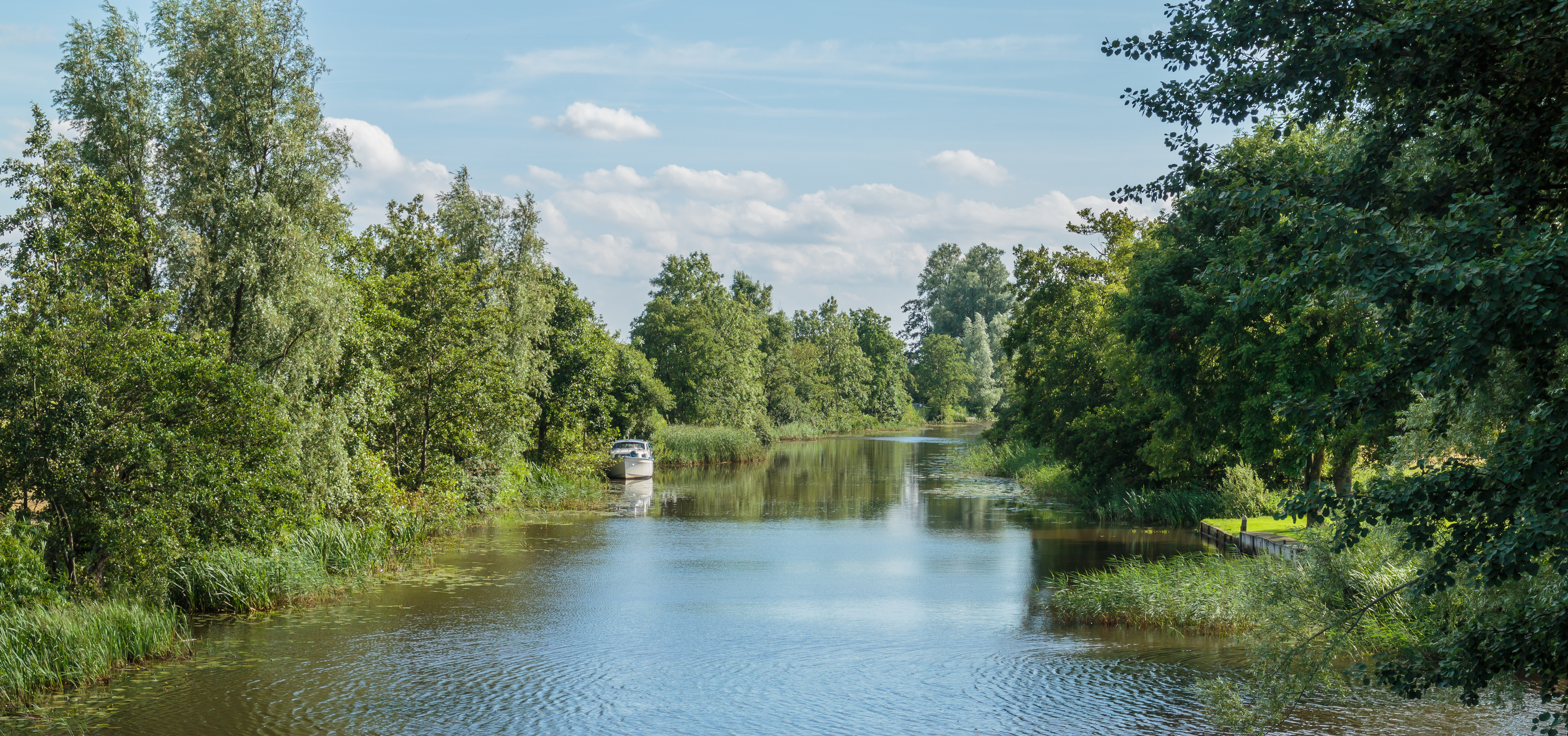
Linde canal

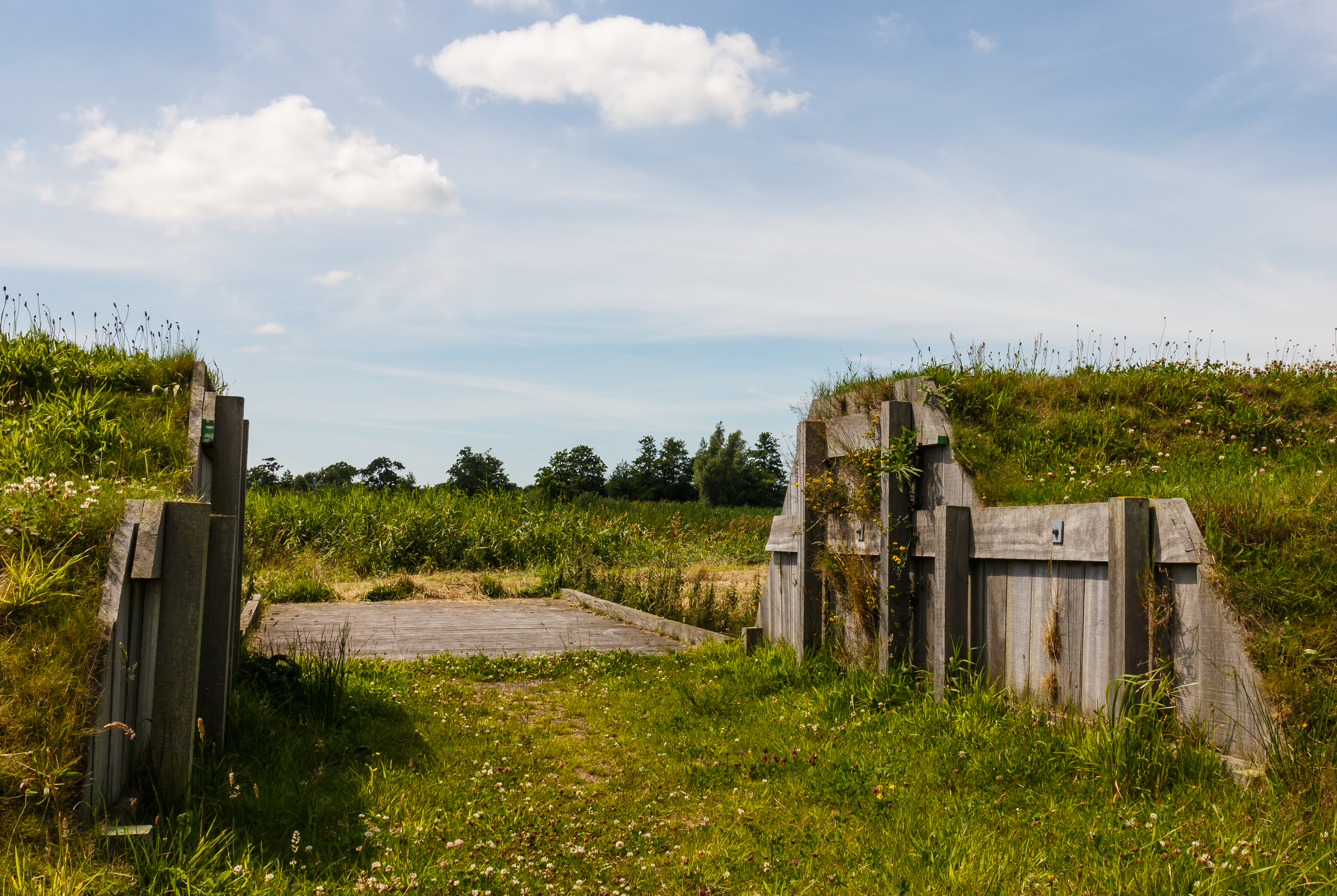
Blesbroggeschaans
