= List of windmills in Friesland (L–M) =

List of windmills in Friesland, Netherlands

A list of windmills in the Dutch province of Friesland, locations beginning L–M.

== L ==
Location	Name of mill	Type	Built	Notes	Photograph
Laaxum	Polder 24; 52°51′27″N 5°24′54″E	Grondzeiler	Before 1850	Demolished before 1930.	
Laaxum	Polder 25; 52°51′27″N 5°25′02″E	Grondzeiler	Before 1832	Demolished before 1929.	
Laaxum	Polder 26; 52°51′31″N 5°26′10″E		Before 1873	Demolished before 1908.	
Laaxum	Polder 26a 52°51′15″N 5°25′57″E		Before 1832	Demolished between 1850 and 1873.	
Langelille	Grote Veenpolder; Molen Nr. 2; 52°51′55″N 5°51′33″E	Grondzeiler	1855	Demolished between 1929 and 1933.	
Langelille	Grote Veenpolder; Molen Nr. 3; 52°49′07″N 5°49′12″E	Grondzeiler	1858	Demolished 1951.	
Langelille	Grote Veenpolder; Molen Nr. 4; 52°51′07″N 5°50′43″E	Grondzeiler	Before 1877	Demolished c.1940.	
Langelille	Grote Veenpolder; Molen Nr. 6; 52°50′36″N 5°50′31″E	Grondzeiler	1879	Demolished 1929.	
Langelille	Grote Veenpolder; 52°51′45″N 5°51′38″E		1877	Demolished before 1932.	
Langelille	Grote Veenpolder; 52°49′04″N 5°49′27″E		Before 1832	Demolished between 1850 and 1929.	
Langelille	Grote Veenpolder; 52°51′34″N 5°51′06″E		1877	Demolished before 1932.	
Langelille	Grote Veenpolder; 52°51′28″N 5°51′13″E		1877	Demolished before 1932.	
Langelille	Grote Veenpolder; 52°51′15″N 5°51′03″E	Spinnenkopmolen	Before 1832	Demolished before 1932.	
Langelille	Grote Veenpolder; 52°51′06″N 5°50′52″E		1877	Demolished before 1932.	
Langelille	Grote Veenpolder; 52°50′39″N 5°50′54″E		1877	Demolished before 1932.	
Langelille	Grote Veenpolder; 52°49′09″N 5°49′19″E	Weidemolen		Demolished before 1929.	
Langelille	Molen van de Armvoogdij; 52°50′22″N 5°50′26″E		Before 1832	Demolished before 1850.	
Langelille	Molen van de Kerk; 52°51′52″N 5°51′36″E		Before 1832	Demolishe post-1850.	
Langelille	Molen van Dominicus Hartkamp; 52°51′50″N 5°51′47″E		Before 1832	Demolished before 1850.	
Langelille	Molen van Jan Koopmans; 52°51′34″N 5°51′04″E	Spinnenkopmolen	Before 1832	Demolished before 1850.	
Langelille	Molen van Johannes Edema; 52°50′56″N 5°50′33″E	Spinnenkopmolen	Before 1832	Demolished post-1850.	
Langelille	Molen van Pieter Hofstee; 52°49′32″N 5°49′30″E	Spinnenkopmolen	Before 1832	Demolished post-1850.	
Langelille	Molen van Roelof de Haan; 52°50′57″N 5°50′39″E	Spinnenkopmolen	Before 1832	Demolished post-1850.	
Langelille	Molen van Romke de Vries; 52°51′24″N 5°50′56″E	Spinnenkopmolen	Before 1832	Demolished between 1850 and 1932.	
Langelille	Molen van Sjoerd Perreboom; 52°49′14″N 5°49′09″E		Before 1832	Demolished c.1850.	
Langelille	Molen van Tijman Hofstee; 52°50′05″N 5°49′53″E	Spinnenkopmolen	Before 1832	Demolished post-1850.	
Langelille	Polder 57; 52°50′11″N 5°50′45″E		Before 1877	Demolished before 1929.	
Langelille	Polder 62; 52°50′37″N 5°51′20″E		Before 1877	Demolished before 1929.	
Langelille	Polder 63; 52°51′04″N 5°51′04″E		Before 1877	Demolished before 1932.	
Langelille	Polder 64; 52°50′53″N 5°51′44″E		Before 1877	Demolished before 1929.	
Langelille	Polder 73a 52°51′47″N 5°52′30″E	Spinnenkopmolen	1877	Demolished before 1929.	
Langelille	52°50′53″N 5°51′14″E	Grondzeiler	1890	Demolished before 1937.	
Langesloot		Spinnenkopmolen	18th century	Moved to Snikzwaag in 1921. Molendatabase (in Dutch); De Hollandsche Molen (in Dutch)	
Langezwaag	52°59′18″N 6°00′14″E		1784/85	Demolished 1805.	
Langezwaag	Molen van Æble Minkema; 52°58′17″N 5°58′20″E		Before 1832	Demolished post-1850.	
Langezwaag	Molen van Gerrit de Jongh; 52°58′49″N 5°58′20″E		Before 1832	Demolished post-1850.	
Langezwaag	Molen van Gerrit de Jongh; 52°59′23″N 6°00′05″E		Before 1832	Demolished post-1850.	
Langezwaag	Molen van Jochem Wijnstra; 52°58′26″N 5°59′50″E	Spinnenkopmolen	Before 1832	Demolished before 1850.	
Langezwaag	Molen van Johannes Westerveen; 53°00′06″N 6°00′46″E		Before 1832	Demolished before 1850.	
Langezwaag	Molen van Sijtze Schoppen; 52°58′30″N 5°58′23″E		Before 1832	Demolished post-1850.	
Langezwaag	Rog Molen; 52°59′18″N 6°00′14″E	Standerdmolen	Before 1660	Demolished 1784.	
Langweer	De Sweachmermolen; 52°57′37″N 5°43′55″E	Stellingmolen	1782		
Langweer	Boornzwaagsterpolder; 52°57′35″N 5°43′58″E	Grondzeiler	1735	Demolished c.1782.	
Langweer	Koevorderhuis-poldermolen; De Aurora; 52°58′30″N 5°41′58″E	Grondzeiler	1879	Demolished 1932.	
Langweer	Molen van Hendrik Oneides; 52°59′19″N 5°43′01″E	Spinnenkopmolen	Before 1832		
Langweer	Molen van Koevorderhuis; 52°58′27″N 5°41′27″E	Stellingmolen	1850	Demolished 1908.	
Langweer	Polder 162; 52°59′36″N 5°42′54″E	Spinnenkopmolen	Before 1832	Demolished post-1930.	
Langweer	Polder 163; 52°59′20″N 5°42′48″E		Before 1832	Demolished before 1929.	
Langweer	Polder 164; 52°59′24″N 5°44′04″E	Spinnenkopmolen	Before 1832	Demolished post-1930.	
Langweer	Polder 164a 52°59′39″N 5°46′56″E		Before 1832	Demolished before 1929.	
Langweer	Polder 165; 52°59′36″N 5°43′11″E	Spinnenkopmolen	Before 1832	Demolished before 1929.	
Langweer	Polder 185; 52°58′09″N 5°44′06″E	Grondzeiler	Before 1873	Demolished post-1930.	
Langweer	Polder 199; 52°57′51″N 5°42′58″E		Between 1832 and 1850	Demolished before 1929.	
Langweer	Polder 200; 52°58′15″N 5°41′34″E		Before 1823	Demolished between 1855 and 1873.	
Langweer	52°57′15″N 5°42′59″E	Spinnenkopmolen	Before 1932	Demolished before 1955.	
Langweer	52°57′16″N 5°43′33″E	Weidemolen	Between 1914 and 1918	Dismantled 1960.	
Langweer	52°57′08″N 5°43′52″E	Weidemolen	Before 1932	Demolished post-1955.	
Langweer		Weidemolen			
Langweer	52°57′02″N 5°44′15″E	Weidemolen	Before 1932	Demolished post-1955.	
Langweer	52°57′26″N 5°43′40″E	Spinnenkopmolen		Demolished c.1735.	
Langweer	52°57′27″N 5°43′51″E	Spinnenkopmolen		Demolished c.1735.	
Langweer	52°57′30″N 5°43′54″E	Spinnenkopmolen		Demolished c.1735.	
Langweer	52°57′31″N 5°43′58″E	Spinnenkopmolen		Demolished c.1735.	
Langweer	Westerzijpen; 52°57′09″N 5°44′23″E	Grondzeiler	1883	Demolished post-1909.	
Langweer	52°57′37″N 5°43′29″E	Stellingmolen	Between 1800 and 1808	Moved to Blokzijl, Overijssel 1823.	
Leeuwarden	De Zwettemolen	Grondzeiler	1896	Moved within Leeuwarden (Frôskepolemolen) 1962. Molendatabase (in Dutch); De Hollandsche Molen (in Dutch)	
Leeuwarden	Froskepôlemolen; 53°11′21″N 5°51′10″E	Grondzeiler	1962		
Leeuwarden	De Haan; 53°12′08″N 5°49′01″E	Stellingmolen	Before 1685	Demolished post-1878, house converted base remains.	
Leeuwarden	De Eendracht	Stellingmolen	1786	Moved to Anjum in 1888, base remains. Molendatabase (in Dutch); De Hollandsche Molen (in Dutch)	
Leeuwarden		Achtkantmolen	1731	1786, Moved to Heerenveen by 1805. Molendatabase (in Dutch); De Hollandsche Molen (in Dutch)	
Leeuwarden	Cammingha-Buurstermolen; 53°12′40″N 5°49′40″E	Grondzeiler	1850	Burnt out 1994, demolished in 2000.	
Leeuwarden	De Visser; 53°12′44″N 5°48′09″E	Stellingmolen	1662	Burnt down 1964.	
Leeuwarden	Chicoriemolen van de familie M. A. Bokma de Boer; 53°12′43″N 5°48′05″E	Spinnenkop stellingmolen	1856	Demolished 1869.	
Leeuwarden	53°12′06″N 5°47′16″E	Standerdmolen	1621	Demolished before 1760.	
Leeuwarden	De Arend; 53°12′06″N 5°47′16″E	Stellingmolen	Before 1760	Demolished 1901.	
Leeuwarden	De Basuin; 53°11′45″N 5°47′39″E	Stellingmolen	1849	Demolished 1913, base demolished 1981.	
Leeuwarden	De Drie Goude Kronen; 53°13′17″N 5°48′29″E	Stellingmolen	1770	Demolished 1892.	
Leeuwarden	De Eendragt; 53°11′54″N 5°45′53″E	Stellingmolen	1763	Burnt down 1878.	
Leeuwarden	De Eendracht; 53°11′54″N 5°45′53″E	Stellingmolen	1883	Demolished 1919.	
Leeuwarden	De Eendracht; De Eendragt; 53°12′39″N 5°47′59″E	Stellingmolen	Before 1786	Burnt down 1820.	
Leeuwarden	De Eendracht; De Eendragt; 53°12′39″N 5°47′59″E	Stellingmolen	c.1820	Demolished 1888, base remains.	
Leeuwarden	De Eenhorn; 53°11′47″N 5°47′51″E	Standerdmolen	Before 1496	Demolished c.1837.	
Leeuwarden	53°11′54″N 5°47′47″E	Standerdmolen	Between 1580 and 1603	Demolished 1760.	
Leeuwarden	De Fortuin; 53°11′54″N 5°47′47″E	Stellingmolen	1760	Moved within Leeuwarden 1873.	
Leeuwarden	De Herderin; De Blauwe Molen; 53°12′20″N 5°48′41″E	Stellingmolen	1829	Moved to Minnertsga c.1892.	
Leeuwarden	De Hersteller; 53°11′51″N 5°46′04″E	Stellingmolen	1819	Demolished 1903.	
Leeuwarden	's Princen Weitmolen; 53°11′58″N 5°47′21″E	Standerdmolen	1614	Demolished 1700.	
Leeuwarden	De Hoop; Groote Weijdmolen 's Prencenweitmolen; 53°11′58″N 5°47′21″E	Stellingmolen	1700	Demolished 1885/86.	
Leeuwarden	Deinumerpoldermolen; 53°11′36″N 5°46′01″E	Grondzeiler	1775	Demolished 1918.	
Leeuwarden	De Jonge; 53°11′51″N 5°47′10″E	Stellingmolen	1871	Moved to Marle bij Wijhe, Overijssel 1887.	
Leeuwarden	53°12′09″N 5°48′43″E		1642	Burnt down 1751.	
Leeuwarden	De Jonge Fenix; De Stenen Molen; 53°12′09″N 5°48′43″E	Stellingmolen	1752	Demolished 1904.	
Leeuwarden	53°11′51″N 5°47′00″E		1699	Rebuilt 1738.	
Leeuwarden	De Kat; 53°11′51″N 5°47′00″E	Stellingmolen	1738	Demolished 1903.	
Leeuwarden	De Kroon; 53°12′05″N 5°49′42″E	Stellingmolen	1760	Demolished 1914.	
Leeuwarden	De Kroon; De Steenbikmolen; 53°11′47″N 5°47′45″E	Stellingmolen	Between 1884 and 1887	Demolished between 1896 and 1940.	
Leeuwarden	53°12′14″N 5°47′19″E	Standerdmolen	1622	Burnt down 1689.	
Leeuwarden	De Leeuw; 53°12′14″N 5°47′19″E	Stellingmolen	1690	Demolished 1882.	
Leeuwarden	De Morgenster; 53°12′07″N 5°48′38″E		1842	Moved to Duurswoude 1861.	
Leeuwarden	De Phenix; De Phoenix; 53°12′08″N 5°48′55″E	Stellingmolen	1848	Moved to Marrum 1917. Base demolished post-1937.	
Leeuwarden	Poltrok| De Palktrik; 53°11′53″N 5°46′02″E	Paltrokmolen	Between 1718 and 1735	Demolished 1812.	
Leeuwarden	53°11′48″N 5°47′47″E	Standerdmolen	Before 1664	Demolishe d1750.	
Leeuwarden	De Rooseboom; 53°11′48″N 5°47′47″E	Stellingmolen	1751	Moved to Hantumhuzen 1863.	
Leeuwarden	De Vrijheid; De Boer; De Herstelling; 53°12′08″N 5°48′55″E	Stellingmolen	1672	Burnt down 1848.	
Leeuwarden	De Vrijheid; De Hoop; Het Haantje; 53°12′10″N 5°49′04″E	Stellingmolen	1672	Burnt down 1884.	
Leeuwarden	Eekmolen van het Gild der Groote Looijers; 53°12′10″N 5°48′55″E		Before 1664	Demolished before 1718.	
Leeuwarden	Het Fortuin; 53°11′51″N 5°47′05″E	Stellingmolen	1873	Burnt down 1886.	
Leeuwarden	Het Fortuin; Oude Molem; 53°12′09″N 5°49′34″E	Stellingmolen	Before 1685	Demolished post-1895.	
Leeuwarden	53°12′23″N 5°48′07″E	Standerdmolen	1595	Demolished 1791.	
Leeuwarden	Het Lam; 53°12′23″N 5°48′07″E	Stellingmolen	1791	Moved within Leeuwarden 1830.	
Leeuwarden	Het Lam; 53°12′08″N 5°47′10″E	Stellingmolen	1830	Demolished 1919, base demolished 1988.	
Leeuwarden	Huzumer en Goutumer Nieuwland; 53°11′15″N 5°46′00″E	Grondzeiler	1896	Moved within Leeuwarden 1962.	
Leeuwarden	Kleijne Weijdmolen; 53°12′16″N 5°48′17″E	Standerdmolen	1621	Demolished 1752.	
Leeuwarden	Koorn Molen; 53°12′09″N 5°48′31″E	Standerdmolen	Before 1542	Demolished post-1790.	
Leeuwarden	53°12′24″N 5°47′52″E	Standerdmolen	Before 1542	Demolished between 1718 and 1786.	
Leeuwarden	53°12′25″N 5°48′01″E	Standerdmolen	Before 1560	Demolished before 1786.	
Leeuwarden	53°12′04″N 5°48′09″E	Standerdmolen	Between 1560 and 1603	Demolished before 1622.	
Leeuwarden	Korenmolen aan het Vliet; 53.°N 5.°E	Standerdmolen	Before 1560	Moved within Leeuwarden 1621.	
Leeuwarden	Korenmolen van het Leeuwarder Blokhuis; 53°12′01″N 5°48′08″E		1547	Demolished between 1603 and 1622.	
Leeuwarden	53°12′08″N 5°49′15″E	Stellingmolen	Before 1685	Demolished c.1841.	
Leeuwarden	Leermolen van Claas Feddes; 53°12′11″N 5°49′13″E		Before 1685	Demolished c.1843.	
Leeuwarden	Molen Hoogland; 53°10′15″N 5°45′53″E	Spinnenkopmolen	1995	Burnt down 1999.	
Leeuwarden	Molen op het Groot Schavernek; 53°12′03″N 5°47′22″E	Standerdmolen	Before 1560	Moved within Leeuwarden 1614.	
Leeuwarden	Molentje op de Wirdumerpoortsdwinger; 53°11′57″N 5°47′45″E	Standerdmolen	1580	Demolished before 1622.	
Leeuwarden	Molen van Baron S. G. J. Rengers; 53°12′34″N 5°49′43″E	Spinnenkopmolen	Before 1832	Demolished befopre 1850.	
Leeuwarden	Molen van Bruin Bruinsma; 53°09′55″N 5°46′33″E		Before 1832	Demolished before 1850.	
Leeuwarden	Molen van Cornelis Westra; 53°12′16″N 5°49′00″E	Spinnenkopmolen	Before 1832	Demolished before 1850.	
Leeuwarden	Molen van Cornelis Westra; 53°12′17″N 5°49′12″E	Spinnenkopmolen	Before 1832	Demolished before 1850.	
Leeuwarden	Polder 10; 53°13′31″N 5°47′33″E	Spinnenkopmolen	Before 1832	Demolished before 1926.	
Leeuwarden	Polder 11; 53°13′27″N 5°48′15″E	Spinnenkopmolen	Before 1832	Demolished 1949.	
Leeuwarden	Polder 12; 53°13′06″N 5°47′50″E	Spinnenkopmolen	Before 1832	Demolished before 1943.	
Leeuwarden	Polder 12; 53°13′00″N 5°48′43″E	Weidemolen	Before 1854	Demolished before 1926.	
Leeuwarden	Polder 12a 53°13′09″N 5°48′11″E		Before 1854	Demolished before 1926.	
Leeuwarden	Polder 13; 53°13′00″N 5°49′05″E		Before 1850	Demolished post-1926.	
Leeuwarden	Polder 14; 53°12′55″N 5°49′10″E	Spinnenkopmolen	Before 1832	Demolished post-1926.	
Leeuwarden	Polder 15; 53°12′52″N 5°49′25″E	Spinnenkopmolen	Before 1832	Demolished before 1928.	
Leeuwarden	Polder 16; 53°12′30″N 5°49′16″E	Spinnenkopmolen	Before 1832	Demolished 1933.	
Leeuwarden	Polder 16a 53°12′29″N 5°49′22″E	Spinnenkopmolen	Before 1832	Demolished between 1854 and 1874.	
Leeuwarden	Polder 17; 53°12′23″N 5°48′57″E	Spinnenkopmolen	Before 1832	Demolished between 1896 and 1905.	
Leeuwarden	Polder 18; 53°12′18″N 5°49′23″E	Spinnenkopmolen	Before 1832	Burnt down 1938.	
Leeuwarden	Polder 19; 53°12′23″N 5°49′42″E	Spinnenkopmolen	Before 1832	Demolished post-1928.	
Leeuwarden	Polder 19a 53°12′28″N 5°49′31″E		before 1832	Demolished before 1926.	
Leeuwarden	Polder 20 bis Molen van Dirk Jonker; 53°12′11″N 5°49′53″E	Spinnenkopmolen	Before 1832	Demolished before 1850.	
Leeuwarden	Polder 20; 53°12′16″N 5°50′09″E	Spinnenkopmolen	Before 1832	Demolished before 1945.	
Leeuwarden	Polder 21; 53°12′03″N 5°49′21″E		Before 1832	Demolished 1894.	
Leeuwarden	Polder 21; 53°12′02″N 5°49′25″E	Spinnenkopmolen	1894	Demolished between 1915 and 1918.	
Leeuwarden	Polder 21a 53°11′59″N 5°48′56″E	Spinnenkopmolen	Before 1832	Demolished 1894.	
Leeuwarden	Polder 21b 53°11′49″N 5°49′12″E	Spinnenkopmolen	Before 1832	Demolished 1929.	
Leeuwarden	Polder 22; Polder Verkouteren; 53°12′08″N 5°49′57″E	Spinnenkopmolen	Before 1832	Destroyed 1949.	
Leeuwarden	Polder 23; 53°11′55″N 5°50′05″E		Before 1832	Demolished before 1926.	
Leeuwarden	Polder 24; 53°11′52″N 5°50′55″E		Before 1832	Demolished before 1926.	
Leeuwarden	Polder 25; 53°11′43″N 5°49′31″E	Spinnenkopmolen	Before 1832	Demolished before 1926.	
Leeuwarden	Polder 26; 53°11′39″N 5°50′19″E	Spinnenkopmolen	Before 1832	Demolished c.1929.	
Leeuwarden	Polder 27; Boonstra's Polder; 53°11′32″N 5°49′28″E	Grondzeiler	Before 1832	Demolished before 1918.	
Leeuwarden	Polder 27a Polder Krol; 53°11′38″N 5°49′57″E	Spinnenkopmolen	Before 1832	Demolished 1926, base demolished c.1971.	
Leeuwarden	Polder 28; 53°11′29″N 5°50′10″E	Spinnenkopmolen	Before 1832	Blown down 1915.	
Leeuwarden	Polder 29; Polder van Dam; 53°11′36″N 5°50′32″E	Spinnenkopmolen	Before 1800	Demolished 1951/52.	
Leeuwarden	Polder 30; 53°11′21″N 5°50′36″E		Before 1832	Demolished before 1926.	
Leeuwarden	Polder 30a 53°11′16″N 5°50′31″E		Before 1832	Demolished before 1926.	
Leeuwarden	Polder 31; Old Feitsmanpolder; 53°11′12″N 5°49′41″E	Spinnenkopmolen	Before 1832	Demolished 1940.	
Leeuwarden	Poolder 32; 53°11′09″N 5°49′11″E		Before 1832	Demolished before 1926.	
Leeuwarden	Polder 33; 53°10′57″N 5°50′15″E		Before 1832	Demolished before 1929.	
Leeuwarden	Polder 34; Teernserpoldermolen; 53°10′56″N 5°50′07″E	Grondzeiler	1880	Demolished 1975.	
Leeuwarden	Polder 35; 53°10′53″N 5°48′53″E	Grondzeiler	1850	Blown down c. 1915.	
Leeuwarden	Polder 36; 53°10′51″N 5°48′43″E	Spinnenkopmolen	Before 1832	Demolished 1928/29.	
Leeuwarden	Polder 37; 53°10′45″N 5°49′06″E		Before 1832	Demolished before 1926.	
Leeuwarden	Polder 38; 53°10′58″N 5°50′28″E		Before 1832	Demolished before 1926.	
Leeuwarden	Polder 39; 53°10′50″N 5°50′14″E	Grondzeiler	Before 1832	Demolished post-1952.	
Leeuwarden	Polder 40; 53°10′30″N 5°48′57″E	Spinnenkopmolen	Before 1832	Demolished post-1929.	
Leeuwarden	Polder 40a 53°10′31″N 5°48′38″E	Spinnenkopmolen	Before 1832	Demolished post-1929.	
Leeuwarden	Polder 41; 53°10′47″N 5°49′43″E	Spinnenkopmolen	Before 1832	Demolished 1928, base demolished c.1999.	
Leeuwarden	Polder 42; 53°10′44″N 5°50′15″E	Spinnenkopmolen	Before 1832	Demolished before 1926.	
Leeuwarden	Polder 43; 53°10′44″N 5°50′53″E		Before 1932	Demolished before 1926.	
Leeuwarden	Polder 44; 53°10′14″N 5°50′31″E	Spinnenkopmolen	Before 1832	Demolished before 1928.	
Leeuwarden	Polder 44a 53°10′34″N 5°50′24″E		Before 1832	Demolished before 1926.	
Leeuwarden	Polder 45; 53°10′27″N 5°50′17″E		Before 1820	Demolished before 1887.	
Leeuwarden	Polder 46; 53°10′13″N 5°50′33″E	Spinnenkopmolen	Before 1832	Demolished before 1928.	
Leeuwarden	Polder 48; 53°10′05″N 5°49′18″E	Spinnenkopmolen	Before 1832	Demolished post-1929.	
Leeuwarden	Polder 49; 53°10′11″N 5°49′03″E		Between 1832 and 1850	Demolished c.1928.	
Leeuwarden	Polder 50; 53°10′05″N 5°48′51″E	Spinnenkopmolen	1850	Demolished post-1929.	
Leeuwarden	Polder 50a 53°09′40″N 5°48′29″E		Between 1832 and 1850	Demolished before 1929.	
Leeuwarden	Polder 50b 53°09′44″N 5°49′07″E	Spinnenkopmolen	1850	Demolished post-1930.	
Leeuwarden	Polder 85; Himrikspoldermolen; De Himriksmolen; Hemriksmolen; Himriksmone; 53°11′42″N 5°50′59″E	Spinnenkopmolen	1830	Moved to Ryptsjerk 1952.	
Leeuwarden	Molen van Douwe van der Kooi; 53°10′53″N 5°48′53″E		Before 1832	Demolished c.1850.	
Leeuwarden	Molen van Klaas Tigler; 53°11′55″N 5°50′03″E		Before 1832	Demolished before 1850.	
Leeuwarden	Molen van Paulus Mebius; 53°13′05″N 5°44′38″E		Before 1832	Demolished before 1850.	
Leeuwarden	Molen van Pieter Cats; 53°12′48″N 5°49′34″E	Spinnenkopmolen	Before 1832	Demolished before 1850.	
Leeuwarden	Molen van Tiete Tromp; 53°13′05″N 5°49′22″E	Spinnenkopmolen	Before 1832	Demolished before 1850.	
Leeuwarden	Molen van Tjeerd Kaastra; 53°11′15″N 5°48′37″E		Before 1832	Demolished before 1850.	
Leeuwarden	Molen van Trijntje IJpma; 53°10′56″N 5°50′07″E		Before 1832	Demolished 1880.	
Leeuwarden	Oliemolen op de Wirdumerpoortsdwinger; 53°11′57″N 5°47′44″E		1638	Moved within Leeuwarden 1642.	
Leeuwarden	53°12′10″N 5°49′37″E	Stellingmolen	1732	Moved to Heerenveen 1805.	
Leeuwarden	Pelmolen van Gerrit Gorter; 53°12′54″N 5°48′21″E		Between 1685 and 1718	Demolished c.1885.	
Leeuwarden	Pelmolen van Jentje Wijbrandt; 53°12′56″N 5°48′20″E	Wip stellingmolen	Between 1685 and 1718	Demolished 1882.	
Leeuwarden	Pelmolen van Tiede Dijkstra; 53°13′00″N 5°48′26″E		1742	Burnt down 1889,	
Leeuwarden	Polder Her Wirdumer Nieuwland; 53°09′44″N 5°46′48″E	Grondzeiler	Between 1850 and 1873	Demolished post-1929.	
Leeuwarden	53°13′05″N 5°47′30″E	Spinnenkopmolen	1840	Demolished 1937, base demolished post-1937.	
Leeuwarden	53°12′54″N 5°47′28″E	Spinnenkopmolen	1850	Demolished post-1928.	
Leeuwarden	53°11′40″N 5°48′49″E		Before 1928		
Leeuwarden	53°10′31″N 5°50′00″E		Before 1887	Demolished before 1928.	
Leeuwarden	Polder Nieuw Barrahuis; Polder Kramer; Molen Kramer; 53°09′21″N 5°46′39″E	Spinnenkopmolen	1800	Moved to Goutum 1995.	
Leeuwarden	Poldr Oud-Barrahuis; Polder Hokwerda; Molen Hoogland; 53°10′02″N 5°46′39″E	Spinnenkopmolen	1800	Moved to Goutum 1995.	
Leeuwarden	53°12′04″N 5°47′21″E	Standerdmolen	Before 1511	Demolished before 1680.	
Leeuwarden	53°12′05″N 5°49′21″E	Tjasker	1894		
Leeuwarden	53°12′58″N 5°48′19″E		Before 1718	Demolished before 1832.	
Leeuwarden	53°12′57″N 5°48′25″E		Before 1718	Demolished before 1832.	
Leeuwarden	Zaagmolen van Jildert Romein; 53°12′33″N 5°47′52″E	Stellingmolen	1840	Burnt down 1858.	
Legemeer	Molen van Anne Holtrop; 52°56′34″N 5°43′25″E		Before 1832	Demolished post-1909.	
Legemeer	Polder 190; 52°56′36″N 5°45′31″E		Before 1873	Demolished before 1930.	
Legemeer	Polder naast Polder 190; 52°56′48″N 5°45′20″E	Grondzeiler	Between 1850 and 1873	Demolished before 1930.	
Legemeer	Polder 191; 52°56′42″N 5°44′53″E		Before 1832	Demolished post-1909.	
Legemeer	52°56′37″N 5°43′25″E	Weidemolen	Before 1909	Demolished c..	
Lekkum	De Bullemolen; 53°13′24″N 5°50′36″E	Grondzeiler	1825		
Lekkum	Polder 104; Polder de Luts; Litspoldermolen; 53°13′46″N 5°49′39″E	Grondzeiler	1840	Demolished 1950.	
Lemmer	De Hoop; 52°50′48″N 5°42′06″E		Before 1832	Burnt down 1857.	
Lemmer	Molen van Jan Olij; De Hoop; 52°50′48″N 5°42′06″E		1857	Burnt down 1867.	
Lemmer	De Hoop; 52°50′48″N 5°42′06″E	Stellingmolen	1868	Demolishe 1927.	
Lemmer	Polder 38; 52°51′02″N 5°41′07″E	Spinnenkopmolen	Before 1873	Demolishedn1918.	
Lemmer	Polder 38a 52°50′47″N 5°41′50″E	Grondzeiler	Before 1873	Demolished c.1950.	
Lemmer	Polder 38b 52°50′43″N 5°42′07″E	Spinnenkopmolen	Before 1832	Demolished before 1930.	
Lemmer	Polder 39; 52°52′54″N 5°39′32″E	Spinnenkopmolen	Before 1832	Demolished post-1930.	
Lemmer	Polder 40; 52°53′01″N 5°39′46″E	Spinnenkopmolen	Before 1832	Demolished post-1930.	
Lemmer	Polder 40? 52°53′06″N 5°39′57″E	Spinnenkopmolen	Before 1832	Demolished post-1850.	
Lemmer	Polder 41; Graverij de Kooi; 52°52′56″N 5°40′24″E	Spinnenkopmolen	Before 1873	Demolished 1901.	
Lemmer	Polder 42; 52°50′49″N 5°40′42″E	Spinnenkopmolen	Before 1832	Demolished before 1929.	
Lemmer	Korenmolen van Lemmer; 52°50′44″N 5°42′12″E		Before 1718	Demolished before 1832.	
Lemmer	Lemsterpolder; 52°50′44″N 5°43′03″E		Before 1873	Demolished before 1930.	
Lemmer	Lemsterpolder; Lemsterpoldermolen; 52°50′47″N 5°43′13″E	Grondzeiler	Before 1832	Demolished 1882.	
Lemmer	Molen van de Zeven Grietenijen en Sloten; 52°50′44″N 5°41′23″E	Spinnenkopmolen	Before 1832	Demolished before 1850.	
Lemmer	Molen van Douariere R. L. de Kampenaar; 52°50′41″N 5°42′21″E		Before 1832	Demolished before 1850.	
Lemmer	Polder De Grens; 52°52′13″N 5°38′58″E	Grondzeiler	1873	Demolished post-1933.	
Lemmer	Polder De Kikkert; Brekkenpoldermolen; 52°51′55″N 5°40′31″E	Grondzeiler	1904	Demolished 1926.	
Lemmer	Polder de Mudsert; 52°51′14″N 5°41′07″E	Spinnenkopmolen	1868	Demolished 1929.	
Lemmer	Polder Kleine Brekkum; 52°51′35″N 5°41′59″E		Before 1873	Demolished before 1922.	
Lemmer	Polder Palsma; 52°53′00″N 5°40′00″E		Before 1908	Demolished before 1930.	
Lemmer	Wiel tussen Rien en Dijk; 52°50′43″N 5°43′06″E	Grondzeiler	Before 1832	Demolished before 1929.	
Lemmer	Zaagmolen van Buwalda; 52°50′46″N 5°42′02″E	Stellingmolen	1716	Burnt down 1811.	
Lemmer	Zaagmolen van Sleeswijk; 52°50′39″N 5°43′01″E	Stellingmolen	1795	Demolished post-1907.	
Leons	Molen van Jr. S. F. Schwartzenburg; 53°08′54″N 5°40′50″E		Before 1820	Demolished 1885.	
Leons	Polder Groot Lions; De Lyonserpoldermolen; 53°08′54″N 5°40′50″E	Grondzeiler	1885	Demolished 1934.	
Leons	Polder 112; Polder Hensensermeer; 53°09′26″N 5°41′27″E	Grondzeiler	1850	Demolished post-1930.	
Lichtaard	Lichtaarderpoldermolen; 53°19′48″N 5°54′57″E	Grondzeiler	Before 1850	Demolished before 1926.	
Lichtaard	Molen van Amelia van Schepper; 53°19′32″N 5°55′18″E	Spinnenkopmolen	Before 1832	Demolished before 1850.	
Lichtaard	Molen van Christoffel Kuipers; 53°19′45″N 5°54′57″E	Spinnenkopmolen	Before 1832	Demolished before 1850.	
Lichtaard	Molen van de Pastorij; 53°19′25″N 5°54′40″E	Spinnenkopmolen	Before 1832	Demolished before 1850.	
Lichtaard	Polder 39; 53°18′58″N 5°55′39″E	Spinnenkopmolen	Before 1832	Demolished before 1926.	
Lichtaard	Polder 40; 53°19′31″N 5°55′13″E	Grondzeiler	Before 1832	Demolished before 1926.	
Lichtaard	53°19′20″N 5°55′10″E		Before 1854	Demolished before 1918.	
Lippenhuizen	53°01′25″N 6°04′52″E	Standerdmolen	Before 1624	Demolished post-1664.	
Lippenhuizen	53°02′04″N 6°04′23″E			Demolished post-1876.	
Lippenhuizen	Polder P 53°02′16″N 6°04′01″E			Demolished post-1876.	
Lippenhuizen	Rog Molen; 53°01′25″N 6°04′52″E	Standerdmolen	Between 1637 and 1680	Demolished post-1836.	
Lippenhuizen	Zaagmolen van Klazinga; 53°00′45″N 6°05′54″E		1858	Burnt down 1864.	
Ljussens	Korenmolen van Lioessens; 53°22′50″N 6°05′02″E	Standerdmolen	Before 1511	Demolished 1763.	
Ljussens	Korenmolen van Lioessens; 53°22′50″N 6°05′02″E		1763	Burnt down 1831.	
Ljussens	Korenmolen van Lioessens; 53°22′50″N 6°05′02″E	Stellingmolen	1835	Demolished post-1840.	
Lollum	Meerswal; 53°08′09″N 5°31′30″E	Grondzeiler	1903		
Lollum	Arumer Miedpoldermolen; Triolum; 53°06′47″N 5°31′09″E	Grondzeiler	1841	Demolished 1990.	
Lollum	Arumerpoldermolen; Grote Achlumer Polder; 53°08′09″N 5°31′30″E	Grondzeiler	1818	Burnt down 1902.	
Lollum	Molen van Abel Lijklama à Nijeholt; 53°07′24″N 5°31′20″E	Spinnenkopmolen	Before 1832	Demolished before 1850.	
Lollum	Molen van Diaconij Ruigelollum; 53°07′11″N 5°31′45″E	Spinnenkopmolen	Before 1832	Demolished before 1850.	
Lollum	Molen van de Stad Franeker; 53°06′56″N 5°30′47″E		Before 1832	Demolished before 1850.	
Lollum	Molen van Foeke Wijnia; 53°07′25″N 5°32′04″E	Spinnenkopmolen	Before 1832	Demolished before 1850.	
Lollum	Molen van Hendrikus van Altena; 53°07′38″N 5°32′35″E		Before 1832	Dempolished before 1850.	
Lollum	Molen van Jacob Terpstra; 53°07′20″N 5°30′55″E		Before 1832	Demolished before 1850.	
Lollum	Molen van Johannes van der Velde; 53°06′55″N 5°30′51″E	Spinnenkopmolen	Before 1832	Demolished before 1850.	
Lollum	Molen van Sicco Popta; 53°07′00″N 5°30′40″E	Spinnenkopmolen	Before 1832	Demolished before 1850.	
Lollum	Moloen van Sipke Basseleur; 53°06′47″N 5°31′09″E	Spinnenkopmolen	Before 1832	Demolished 1841.	
Lollum	Polder 3; 53°08′23″N 5°31′32″E	Spinnenkopmolen	Before 1832	Demolished post-1850.	
Lollum	Polder 4; 53°08′31″N 5°32′03″E		Before 1832	Demolished post-1850.	
Lollum	Polder 5; 53°07′47″N 5°32′22″E		Before 1832	Demolished post-1850.	
Lollum	Polder 6; 53°07′39″N 5°31′18″E	Spinnenkopmolen	Before 1832	Demolished post-1850.	
Lollum	Polder 7; 53°07′44″N 5°32′06″E	Spinnenkopmolen	Before 1832	Demolished post-1850.	
Lollum	Polder 8; 53°07′27″N 5°32′30″E		Before 1832	Demolished before 1850.	
Lollum	Polder 10; 53°07′45″N 5°32′44″E	Spinnenkopmolen	Before 1832	Demolished post-1850.	
Longerhouw	Polder 28; 53°04′02″N 5°28′31″E	Spinnenkopmolen	Before 1832	Demolished before 1929.	
Luinjeberd	Tjasker bij De Deelen; 53°01′24″N 5°55′05″E	Paaltjasker	1973		
Luinjeberd	Polder 15; 52°59′11″N 5°55′43″E		Before 1832	Demolished between 1850 and 1877.	
Luinjeberd	Vierde en Vijfde Veendistrict; De Pijlmolen; 53°00′40″N 5°55′08″E	Grondzeiler	1857	Move to Akmarijp 1897.	
Luinjeberd	52°59′30″N 5°55′45″E	Weidemolen	Before 1920		
Luinjeberd	52°59′34″N 5°54′26″E	Weidemolen	1908	Dempolished post-1930.	
Luxwoude	Molen van Albert Wijnstra; 52°59′28″N 5°58′35″E		Before 1832	Demolished before 1850.	
Luxwoude	Molen van Dirk Minkema; 53°01′06″N 5°59′20″E		Before 1832	Demolished before 1850.	
Luxwoude	Molen van Hendrik van Dam; 53°01′12″N 5°59′45″E		Before 1832	Demolished before 1850.	
Luxwoude	Molen van Hendrik van Dam; 52°01′13″N 5°59′22″E		Before 1832	Demolished post-1850.	
Luxwoude	Molen van Jan Luxwolde; 53°00′43″N 5°59′12″E		Before 1832	Demolished before 1850.	
Luxwoude	Molen van Tjeerd Wijnstra; 52°59′07″N 5°58′06″E		Before 1832	Demoplished before 1850.	
Lytsewierum	Waterschap Scharnegoutum; Groote Wierumerpolder; Greate Wierum; 53°04′45″N 5°39′49″E	Iron windpump	1922		
Lytsewierum	De Zwarte Molen; 53°05′15″N 5°40′18″E	Spinnenkopmolen	Before 1832	Demolished post-1864.	
Lytsewierum	Korenmolen van Lutkewierum		Before 1660	Demolished before 1832.	
Lytsewierum	Molen van Theodorus Looxma; 53°04′59″N 5°40′49″E	Spinnenkopmolen	Before 1832	Demolished before 1850.	
Lytsewierum	Polder 248; 53°05′34″N 5°40′06″E		Before 1832	Demolished before 1850.	
Lytsewierum	Polder 251; 53°05′16″N 5°40′01″E	Spinnenkopmolen	Before 1832	Demolished before 1928.	
Lytsewierum	Polder 252; 53°04′52″N 5°40′42″E	Spinnenkopmolen	Before 1832	Demolished 1922.	
Lytsewierum	Polder 262; 53°04′49″N 5°39′51″E	Spinnenkopmolen	Before 1832	Demolished 1922.	
Lytsewierum	Polder 263; 53°05′16″N 5°39′43″E	Spinnenkopmolen	Before 1750	Demolished before 1950.	
Lytsewierum	Polder 264; 53°05′22″N 5°39′30″E	Spinnenkopmolen	Before 1832	Demolished before 1950.	
Lytsewierum	Polder 275; 53°04′27″N 5°39′12″E	Spinnenkopmolen	Before 1832	Demolished 1922.	
Lytsewierum	Polder 276; 53°04′34″N 5°39′24″E	Spinnenkopmolen	Before 1832	Demolished 1922.	
Lytsewierum	Polder 277; 53°04′27″N 5°39′43″E	Spinnenkopmolen	Before 1832	Demolished 1922.	
Lytsewierum	Polder 277a 53°04′44″N 5°39′48″E	Spinnenkopmolen	Before 1832	Demolshed 1922.	

== M ==
Location	Name of mill	Type	Built	Notes	Photograph
Makkinga	De Weyert; 52°58′14″N 6°11′32″E	Stellingmolen	1913	Moved within Makkinga 1925.	
Makkinga	De Weyert; 52°58′56″N 6°13′01″E	Stellingmolen	1925		
Makkinga	Korenmolen van Makkinga; 52°58′56″N 6°13′01″E	Standerdmolen	Before 1528	Demolished before 1718.	
Makkinga	Korenmolen van Twijtel; 52°58′20″N 6°11′28″E	Standerdmolen	Before 1685	Blown down 1869.	
Makkinga	Molen van Barteids; 52°58′55″N 6°13′06″E		Before 1718	Demolished between 1832 and 1849.	
Makkinga	Molen van Zeephat; 52°58′20″N 6°11′28″E	Grondzeiler	1870	Burnt down 1912.	
Makkinga	Polder 7; 52°59′29″N 6°12′26″E		Before 1877	Demolished before 1922.	
Makkinga	Polder 9; 52°58′55″N 6°11′45″E		Before 1877	Demolished before 1922.	
Makkinga	Polder 9; 52°58′56″N 6°11′36″E		Before 1877	Demolished before 1922.	
Makkinga	Polder 10; 52°59′32″N 6°12′35″E	Spinnenkopmolen	Before 1832	Demolished between 1850 and 1922.	
Makkinga	Polder 11; 52°59′44″N 6°14′09″E		Before 1877	Demolished before 1923.	
Makkinga	Polder A 52°59′29″N 6°12′31″E	Weidemolen	1877	Demolished before 1922.	
Makkinga	Polder B 52°59′14″N 6°13′13″E	Weidemolen	1877	Demolished before 1922.	
Makkum	Waterschap De Weeren; De Weeren; 53°03′46″N 5°24′53″E	Grondzeiler	1921	Demolished 1951.	
Makkum	Cementmolen van Kingma; 53°03′18″N 5°24′22″E	Stellingmolen	1849	Demolished 1917.	
Makkum	De Eendracht; Molen van Alta; 53°02′59″N 5°24′30″E	Stellingmolen	1777	Demolished 1917.	
Makkum	Het Springend Hert; 53°02′59″N 5°24′36″E	Stellingmolen	1768	Demolished 1911.	
Makkum			1823	Demolished post-1830.	
Makkum	Lorenmolen van L. J. Sluiter; Windlust; 53°03′30″N 5°24′06″E	Stellingmolen	1843	Demolished between 1899 and 1928.	
Makkum	Korenmolen van Makkum; 53°03′30″N 5°23′58″E	Standerdmolen	Before 1623	Demolished between 1820 and 1832.	
Makkum	Molen van Anne Buma; 53°03′00″N 5°24′49″E		Before 1832	Demolished before 1850.	
Makkum	Molen van de Doopsgezinde Gemeente; 53°03′58″N 5°25′09″E		Before 1832	Demolished before 1850.	
Makkum			Before 1718	Demolished post-1776.	
Makkum	Polder 18. 53°04′14″N 5°23′58″E	Spinnenkopmolen	Before 1832	Demolished post-1850.	
Makkum	Polder 19; 53°03′55″N 5°23′59″E	Grondzeiler	Before 1832	Demolished before 1928.	
Makkum	Polder 19a 53°03′30″N 5°24′29″E		Between 1850 and 1873	Demolished before 1930.	
Makkum	Polder 19b 53°03′34″N 5°24′50″E		Before 1850	Demolished before 1930.	
Makkum	Polder 20; 53°03′01″N 5°24′24″E	Spinnenkopmolen	Before 1832	Demolished 1826.	
Makkum	Polder 21; 53°03′05″N 5°24′59″E		1832	Burnt down 1864.	
Makkum	Polder 21; 53°03′05″N 5°24′59″E	Grondzeiler	1864	Demolished before 1930.	
Makkum	Polder 22; 53°03′17″N 5°25′31″E	Grondzeiler	Before 1873	Demolished before 1928.	
Makkum	Polder 23; 53°03′56″N 5°26′10″E	Spinnenkop stellingmolen	Before 1832	Demolished before 1929.	
Makkum	't Fortuin uit Zee; 53°03′04″N 5°24′24″E	Stellingmolen	1764	Demolished 1933/34.	
Makkum	53°03′08″N 5°24′22″E	Wip stellingmolen	1718	Demolished before 1776.	
Makkum	Molen van Alta; 53°03′08″N 5°24′22″E	Stellingmolen	1776	Partly demolished 1923, rest demolished 1981.	
Makkum		Wip stellingmolen	Before 1776	Demolished post 1815.	
Mantgum	Waterschap De Oosterwierumer Oudvaart; Mantgumermolen; 53°07′23″N 5°44′38″E	Iron windpump	1902		
Mantgum	Kleine Mantgumerpoldermolen; 53°07′45″N 5°44′33″E		Before 1873	Demolished before 1929.	
Mantgum	Molen van de Gereformeerde Kerkvoogdij; 53°07′56″N 5°42′14″E		Before 1832	Demolished c.1827.	
Mantgum	Molen van Gerardus van Wageningen; 53°07′20″N 5°41′59″E		Before 1832	Demolished post-1850.	
Mantgum	Molen van Pieter Bosma; 53°07′30″N 5°41′39″E		Before 1832	Demolished before 1850.	
Mantgum	Molen van Sijbren Hogenbrug; 53°07′49″N 5°41′18″E		Before 1832	Demolished post-1850.	
Mantgum	Molen van Thomas Martijn; 53°07′50″N 5°41′48″E		Before 1832	Demolished before 1850.	
Mantgum	Polder 101; 53°07′29″N 5°41′22″E		Before 1832	Demolished before 1929.	
Mantgum	Polder 104; 53°07′09″N 5°42′34″E		Before 1832	Demolished before 1924.	
Mantgum	Polder 106; 53°07′21″N 5°43′11″E	Spinnenkopmolen	Before 1832	Demolished before 1929.	
Mantgum	Polder 107; 53°07′14″N 5°42′17″E	Spinnenkopmolen	Before 1832	Demolished before 1929.	
Mantgum	Polder 108; 53°07′34″N 5°42′14″E		Before 1832	Demolished before 1929.	
Mantgum	Polder 109; 53°07′58″N 5°41′17″E		Before 1832	Demolished before 1929.	
Mantgum	Polder Groot-Mantgum; 53°07′40″N 5°45′06″E		1823	Demolished before 1929.	
Mantgum	Tjeintgumerpoldermolen; 53°08′06″N 5°42′11″E		1827	Burnt down 1828.	
Mantgum	Tjeintgumerpoldermolen; 53°08′06″N 5°42′11″E		1828	Demolished 1921.	
Mantgum	name 53°08′00″N 5°43′31″E	Weidemolen	Before 1932	Demolished before 1961.	
Marrum	De Grote Molen; 53°19′06″N 5°47′48″E	Grondzeiler	1845		
Marrum	De Kleilânsmole; 53°19′22″N 5°46′41″E	Grondzeiler	1865	Demolished 2010, to be rebuilt at Ferwerd.	
Marrum	De Phenix; 53°19′15″N 5°49′10″E	Achtkantmolen	1845	Burnt down 1916.	
Marrum	De Phenix; 53°19′15″N 5°49′10″E	Grondzeiler	1917		
Marrum	Molen van Jacob van der Mei; 53°19′17″N 5°49′44″E		Before 1832	Demolished before 1850.	
Marssum	De Marssumermolen; 53°12′45″N 5°43′09″E	Grondzeiler	1903		
Marssum	Terpzigt; 53°12′15″N 5°43′28″E	Spinnenkop	1888		
Marssum	Molen van Everhardus van Scheltinga; 53°12′08″N 5°43′20″E		Before 1832	Demolished before 1877.	
Marssum	Molen van het St. Anthonie Gasthuis; 53°12′56″N 5°44′38″E		Before 1832	Demolished before 1850.	
Marssum	Polder 15; 53°12′43″N 5°42′59″E		Before 1873	Demolished before 1929.	
Marssum	Polder 15a 53°12′45″N 5°43′22″E		1873	Demolished before 1929.	
Marssum	Polder 15b 53°12′59″N 5°44′28″E		Before 1873	Demolished before 1929.	
Marssum	Polder 15c 53°12′48″N 5°44′37″E		Before 1832	Demolished post-1850.	
Marssum	Polder 17; Polder Talsma; 53°12′15″N 5°43′28″E	Spinnenkopmolen	Before 1832	Demolished 1887.	
Menaam	De Kievit; 53°13′40″N 5°39′14″E	Grondzeiler	1802		
Menaam	Zuidoosterpoldermolen; Kooimolen; 53°12′32″N 5°40′37″E	Grondzeiler	1857	Burnt down 1969.	
Menaam	De Rentmeester; 53°12′32″N 5°40′37″E	Grondzeiler	1981		
Menaam	Andringapoldermolen; 53°12′57″N 5°37′57″E		Before 1873	Demolished before 1929.	
Menaam	Hoeksterpoldermolen; De Hoekstermone; 53°12′39″N 5°38′40″E	Grondzeiler	1783	Demolished 1969.	
Menaam	Korenmolen van Meersma; 53°12′40″N 5°40′20″E	Stellingmolen	1863	Moved to Leur, North Brabant 1915, base demolished 1917.	
Menaam	Korenmolen van Menaldum; 53°13′02″N 5°39′32″E	Standerdmolen	Before 1664	Demolished before 1718.	
Menaam	Molen van Bouwe van der Meulen; 53°13′42″N 5°56′38″E		Before 1832	Demolished before 1850.	
Menaam	Molen van Jan Brouwer; 53°13′12″N 5°38′50″E		Before 1832	Demolished before 1850.	
Menaam	Molen van Neno Viëntor; 53°12′17″N 5°39′46″E		Before 1832	Demolished post-1850.	
Menaam	Molen van Rutger Fopma; 53°12′49″N 5°40′23″E		Before 1832	Demolished before 1850.	
Menaam	Polder 18; 53°13′09″N 5°40′21″E		Before 1832	Demolished before 1928.	
Menaam	Polder 25; 53°13′05″N 5°38′46″E		Before 1873	Demolished before 1929.	
Menaam	Polder 25a 53°13′17″N 5°38′54″E		Before 1873	Demolished before 1929.	
Menaam	Ringpoldermolen; 53°13′37″N 5°38′17″E		Before 1850	Demolished before 1929.	
Menaam	Sijboutpoldermolen; 53°13′12″N 5°38′55″E		Before 1832	Demolished before 1929.	
Menaam	Verhuisterpoldermolen; 53°13′17″N 5°40′50″E	Grondzeiler	Before 1832	Demolished before 1928.	
Menaam	Westerwirderpoldermolen; 53°13′27″N 5°41′26″E	Grondzeiler	Before 1832	Demolished post-1850.	
Metslawier	De Ropta; 53°22′09″N 6°04′13″E	Stellingmolen	1836		
Miedum	Groote Miedumerpoldermolen; 53°14′19″N 5°49′48″E	Grondzeiler	1822	Demolished 1947.	
Miedum	Polder 105; Miedumer Hoeksterpoldermolen; 53°14′12″N 5°50′57″E	Spinnenkopmolen	1853	Demolished 1939.	
Miedum	Miedumerpoldermolen; 53°13′57″N 5°49′39″E	Grondzeiler	Before 1832	Burnt down 1937.	
Miedum	Molen van Geradus van Wageningen; 53°14′03″N 5°50′36″E		Before 1832	Demolished between 1839 and 1847.	
Miedum	Molen van Pieter Cats; 53°13′47″N 5°49′41″E	Spinnenkopmolen	Before 1832	Demolished post-1850.	
Mildam	De Tjongermolen; 52°55′55″N 5°59′38″E	Grondzeiler	1983		
Mildam	Korenmolen van Mildam; 52°56′09″N 5°59′59″E	Standerdmolen	1506	Demolished between 1797 and 1819.	
Mildam	Polder 111a 52°55′44″N 6°04′07″E		Before 1877	Demolished before 1922.	
Mildam	Polder 123c 52°55′16″N 6°02′39″E		Before 1877	Demolished before 1922.	
Mildam	Polder 123e 52°55′07″N 6°02′22″E		Before 1877	Demolished before 1922.	
Mildam	Polder 125; 52°55′43″N 6°03′47″E		Before 1877	Demolished before 1922.	
Mildam	Polder 152; 52°56′10″N 6°00′24″E		Before 1877	Demolished before 1922.	
Mildam	Polder 153; 52°56′09″N 6°00′20″E		Before 1877	Demolished before 1922.	
Minnertsga	Korenmolen van Minnertsga; 53°15′07″N 5°35′13″E	Standerdmolen	Before 1718	Demolished c.1830.	
Minnertsga	De Welkomst; 53°15′07″N 5°35′13″E	Stellingmolen	1810	Burnt down 1888.	
Minnertsga	De Welkomst; 53°15′07″N 5°35′13″E	Stellingmolen	Between 1890 and 1892	Demolished 1947.	
Minnertsga	Minnertsgaaster Zuidermiedpoldermolen; 53°13′48″N 5°35′14″E	Grondzeiler	1837	Demolished c. 1947.	
Minnertsga	Molen van C. E. E. d'Escury; 53°14′43″N 5°34′22″E		Before 1832	Demolished before 1850.	
Minnertsga	Molen van Klaas Sipma; 53°14′47″N 5°35′06″E		Before 1832	Demolished before 1850.	
Minnertsga	Polder 20; 53°14′25″N 5°36′57″E	Grondzeiler	Before 1832	Demolished 1888.	
Minnertsga	Polder 21; 53°14′21″N 5°36′36″E	Grondzeiler	Before 1832	Demolished post-1930.	
Mirns	De Zeven Grietenijen van de Stat Sloten; De Mokkebank; 52°51′19″N 5°27′10″E	Iron windpump	1932		
Mirns	Polder de Zuiderfennen; 52°51′00″N 5°30′03″E		1873	Demolished before 1930.	
Mirns	52°51′35″N 5°26′09″E		1850	Demolished post-1908.	
Mirns	Wielpoldermolen; 52°51′22″N 5°26′59″E		Before 1718	Demolished between 1832 and 1850.	
Mirns	Wielpoldermolen; 52°51′32″N 5°26′17″E	Grondzeiler	Between 1873 and 1908	demolished c. 1929.	
Molkwerum	Windmotor Molkwerum; 52°54′10″N 5°26′14″E	Iron windpump	1925		
Molkwerum	Molen van Durk Feenstra; 52°53′48″N 5°24′23″E	Spinnenkopmolen	Before 1832	Demolished post-1850.	
Molkwerum	Molen van Johannes Althuizen; 52°53′53″N 5°24′28″E	Spinnenkopmolen	Before 1832	Demolished before 1850.	
Molkwerum	Molen van Lysbert van der Veer; 52°54′04″N 5°24′18″E	Spinnenkopmolen	Before 1832	Demolished before 1850.	
Molkwerum	Molen van Reider Glasma; 52°54′15″N 5°23′53″E		Before 1832	Demolished before 1850.	
Molkwerum	Molen van Sytzes Hollander; 52°54′07″N 5°24′22″E	Spinnenkopmolen	Before 1832	Demolished before 1850.	
Molkwerum	Noordgepoldermolen; 52°54′16″N 5°24′37″E	Grondzeiler	1843	Demolished post-1873.	
Molkwerum	Noordgepoldermolen; 52°54′25″N 5°24′46″E		Between 1850 and 1873	Demolished before 1928.	
Molkwerum	Polder 14; 52°54′07″N 5°23′35″E	Spinnenkopmolen	Before 1832	Demolished before 1908.	
Molkwerum	Polder 14a 52°54′16″N 5°23′49″E	Tjasker	Before 1850	Demolished post-1930.	
Molkwerum	Polder 15; 52.°N 5.°E	Spinnenkopmolen	Before 1832	Demolished post-1930.	
Molkwerum	Polder 15a 52°53′52″N 5°24′00″E		Before 1850	Demolished before 1928.	
Molkwerum	Polder 16; 52°53′53″N 5°22′59″E	Spinnenkopmolen	Before 1832	Demolished before 1850.	
Molkwerum	Polder 16a 52°53′44″N 5°24′04″E	Spinnenkopmolen	Before 1832	Demolished before 1928.	
Molkwerum	Polder Diekstra; 52°54′00″N 5°23′32″E		Before 1908	Demolished before 1948.	
Mûnein	Roodkerkstermolen; 53°15′09″N 5°55′17″E	Standerdmolen	Before 1712	Demolished 1764.	
Mûnein	53°15′09″N 5°55′17″E	Grondzeiler	1864		
Mûnein	53°15′09″N 5°55′17″E	Stellingmolen		Demolished c.1900.	
Mûnein	Molen van Piebe van der Meulen; 53°15′04″N 5°55′28″E	Tjasker	Before 1832	Demolished before 1850.	
Munnekeburen	Grote Veenpolder part g 52°51′36″N 5°53′11″E		1877	Demolished before 1932.	
Munnekeburen	Groote Veenpoder part h 52°51′24″N 5°53′47″E		1877	Demolished before 1932.	
Munnekeburen	Groote Veenpolder part i 52°51′09″N 5°54′01″E	Spinnenkopmolen	Before 1832	Demolished before 1932.	
Munnekeburen	Groote Veenpolder part j 52°51′10″N 5°52′02″E		1877	Demolished before 1932.	
Munnekeburen	Groote Veenpolder part k 52°51′03″N 5°53′13″E		1877	Demolished before 1932.	
Munnekeburen	Groote Veenpolder part l 52°50′53″N 5°53′26″E	Spinnenkopmolen	Before 1832	Demolished before 1932.	
Munnekeburen	Groote Veenpolder part m 52°50′37″N 5°53′12″E		1877	Demolished before 1932.	
Munnekeburen	Korenmolen vna Munnekeburen	Standerdmolen	Before 1543	Demolished post-1664.	
Munnekeburen	Molen van Josep Koopmans; 52°50′54″N 5°53′07″E		Before 1832	Demolished before 1850.	
Munnekeburen	Polder 57b 52°50′22″N 5°51′29″E	Spinnenkopmolen	Before 1908	Demolished before 1934.	
Munnekeburen	Polder 65; 52°50′44″N 5°51′40″E	Grondzeiler	Between 1850 and 1874	Demolished between 1930 and 1932.	
Munnekeburen	Polder 65a 52°50′34″N 5°51′35″E	Spinnenkopmolen	1877	Demolished before 1932.	
Munnekeburen	Polder 66; 52°50′53″N 5°52′15″E	Spinnenkopmolen	Before 1877	Demolishe post-1929.	
Munnekeburen	Polder 67; 52°50′57″N 5°52′18″E		Before 1877	Demolished before 1929.	
Munnekeburen	Polder 68; 52°50′57″N 5°53′00″E		Before 1877	Demolished before 1929.	
Munnekeburen	Polder 69; 52°50′39″N 5°53′28″E		Before 1877	Demolished before 1929.	
Munnekeburen	Polder 70; 52°50′44″N 5°53′23″E		Before 1877	Demolished before 1929.	
Munnekeburen	Polder 72; 52°51′17″N 5°53′24″E		Before 1877	Demolished before 1929.	
Munnekeburen	Polder 73; 52°51′24″N 5°53′15″E	Spinnenkopmolen	Before 1877	Demolished before 1929.	
Munnekeburen	Polder 74; 52°51′22″N 5°54′13″E	Spinnenkopmolen	Before 1877	Demolished before 1929.	
Munnekezijl	Munnekezijlstermolen; Rust Roest; 53°18′15″N 6°16′27″E	Stellingmolen	1856		
Munnekezijl	Bokkemolen; Molen van Bok; 53°18′09″N 6°16′36″E	Stellingmolen	1850	Demolished c.1920.	
Munnekezijl	Korenmolen van Munnekzijl; 53°18′05″N 6°16′29″E	Standerdmolen	Before 1622	Demolished 1742.	
Munnekezijl	Polder 13; 53°18′25″N 6°16′08″E		1874	Demolished before 1929.	
Munnekezijl	Polder Ooster Nieuwkruisland; De Oostermolen; 53°18′00″N 6°14′37″E	Grondzeiler	1845	Moved to Westergeast 1937.	

== Notes ==
Mills still standing marked in bold. Known building dates are bold, otherwise the date is the earliest known date the mill was standing.
