= List of English football transfers winter 2005–06 =

This is a list of English football transfers for the 2005–06 season. Only moves featuring at least one Premier League or Championship club are listed.

The winter transfer window opened on 1 January 2006, although a few transfers took place prior to that date. Players without a club could join one at any time, either during or in between transfer windows. Clubs below Premier League level could also sign players on loan at any time. If need be, clubs could sign a goalkeeper on an emergency loan, if all others were unavailable. The window re-opened in May 2006.

== Post-window deals ==
Date	Name	Nat	Moving from	Moving to	Fee
28 October 2005	Jemal Johnson	(United States)	Blackburn Rovers	Preston North End	Loan

== January transfers ==
Date	Name	Moving from	Moving to	Fee
1 January 2006	Tony Warner	Cardiff City	Fulham	Nominal (making a previous loan deal permanent)
1 January 2006	Mikel John Obi	Lyn	Chelsea	Undisclosed
3 January 2006	Yaniv Katan	Maccabi Haifa	West Ham United	£100k
4 January 2006	Josemi	Liverpool	Villarreal	Swap (Kromkamp deal)
4 January 2006	Jan Kromkamp	Villarreal	Liverpool	Swap (Part of Josemi deal)
4 January 2006	Laurent Robert	Portsmouth	Newcastle United	loan cancelled
4 January 2006	Laurent Robert	Newcastle United	Benfica	free
4 January 2006	Maniche	Dynamo Moscow	Chelsea	six-month loan
4 January 2006	Emmanuel Olisadebe	Panathinaikos	Portsmouth	six-month loan
5 January 2006	Chris Sutton	Celtic	Birmingham City	free
5 January 2006	Nemanja Vidić	Spartak Moscow	Manchester United	£7m
5 January 2006	Albert Riera	Espanyol	Manchester City	six-month loan
6 January 2006	Simon Elliott	Major League Soccer (Columbus Crew)	Fulham	free
6 January 2006	Ali Al Habsi	Lyn	Bolton Wanderers	Undisclosed
6 January 2006	Benjani Mwaruwari	Auxerre	Portsmouth	£4.1m
9 January 2006	David Bellion	Manchester United	Nice	six-month loan
9 January 2006	Paul Scharner	Brann	Wigan Athletic	£2.5m
10 January 2006	Patrice Evra	AS Monaco	Manchester United	£5.5m
10 January 2006	Antti Niemi	Southampton	Fulham	£1m
12 January 2006	Sean Davis	Tottenham Hotspur	Portsmouth	Undisclosed
12 January 2006	Pedro Mendes	Tottenham Hotspur	Portsmouth	Undisclosed
12 January 2006	Noe Pamarot	Tottenham Hotspur	Portsmouth	Undisclosed
12 January 2006	Daniel Agger	Brøndby	Liverpool	£5.8m
12 January 2006	Abou Diaby	Auxerre	Arsenal	£2m
12 January 2006	Walter Pandiani	Birmingham City	Espanyol	£1m
13 January 2006	Garry Flitcroft	Blackburn Rovers	Sheffield United	free
13 January 2006	Emmanuel Adebayor	AS Monaco	Arsenal	Undisclosed
17 January 2006	Marcus Bent	Everton	Charlton Athletic	£2m
17 January 2006	Riccardo Scimeca	West Bromwich Albion	Cardiff City	free
19 January 2006	Neil Mellor	Liverpool	Wigan Athletic	six-month loan
19 January 2006	David Thompson	Blackburn Rovers	Wigan Athletic	free
19 January 2006	Wayne Bridge	Chelsea	Fulham	six-month loan
20 January 2006	Alan Stubbs	Sunderland	Everton	free
20 January 2006	Theo Walcott	Southampton	Arsenal	Initially £5m (Final price £9.1m)
23 January 2006	Dean Ashton	Norwich City	West Ham	£7.25m
23 January 2006	Mart Poom	Sunderland	Arsenal	Undisclosed (making a loan deal permanent)
24 January 2006	Alexey Smertin	Chelsea	Dynamo Moscow	£1m
25 January 2006	Tomasz Frankowski	Elche	Wolves	£1.4m
25 January 2006	Dean Kiely	Charlton Athletic	Portsmouth	undisclosed fee
25 January 2006	Szilárd Németh	Middlesbrough	Strasbourg	six-month loan
26 January 2006	Ade Akinbiyi	Burnley	Sheffield United	£1.75m
27 January 2006	Robbie Fowler	Manchester City	Liverpool	free
30 January 2006	Georgios Samaras	Heerenveen	Manchester City	£6m
31 January 2006	David Bentley	Arsenal	Blackburn Rovers	Undisclosed
31 January 2006	Andrés d'Alessandro	Wolfsburg	Portsmouth	six-month loan
31 January 2006	Rory Delap	Southampton	Sunderland	free
31 January 2006	Robert Earnshaw	West Brom	Norwich City	£3.5m
31 January 2006	Hossam Ghaly	Feyenoord	Tottenham Hotspur	Undisclosed
31 January 2006	Danny Murphy	Charlton Athletic	Tottenham Hotspur	£2m
31 January 2006	Quincy Owusu-Abeyie	Arsenal	Spartak Moscow	Undisclosed
31 January 2006	Nigel Quashie	Southampton	West Brom	£1.2m
31 January 2006	Andy Welsh	Sunderland	Leicester City	three-month loan
31 January 2006	Zesh Rehman	Fulham	Norwich City	six-month loan
31 January 2006	Lionel Scaloni	Deportivo de La Coruña	West Ham United	six-month loan
31 January 2006	Florent Sinama Pongolle	Liverpool	Blackburn Rovers	six-month loan
31 January 2006	Matty Fryatt	Walsall	Leicester City	Undisclosed
31 January 2006	Joey Guðjónsson	Leicester City	AZ Alkmaar	free
