= Great Mill =

Great Mill, or its Dutch equivalent, Grote Molen, may refer to:

== Great Mill ==
- Great Mill, Appledore, a windmill in Kent
- Great Mill, Attleborough, a windmill in Norfolk
- Great Mill, Deal, a windmill in Kent
- Great Mill, Frindsbury, a windmill in Kent
- Great Mill, Haddenham, a windmill in Cambridgeshire
- Great Mill, Middleton, a windmill in Norfolk
- Great Mill, Sheerness, a windmill in Kent
- Great Mill, Southwold, a windmill in Suffolk
- Great Mill, Thorpe le Soken, a windmill in Essex
- Great Mill, Wickhambrook, a windmill in Suffolk
- Great Mill, Williton, a windmill in Somerset
- Great Mill, Woodham Mortimer, a windmill in Essex

== De Grote Molen ==
- De Grote Molen, Dokkum, a windmill in Friesland that was demolished in 1840
- De Grote Molen, Marrum, a windmill in Friesland
- De Grote Molen, Schellinkhout, a windmill in North Holland

== Grote Molen ==
- Grote Molen, Stalhille, a windmill in West Flanders, Belgium
- Grote Molen, Zoeterwoude-Rijndijk, a windmill in South Holland

== Grutte Mûne ==
- Grutte Mûne, Broeksterwâld, a windmill in Friesland

== See also ==
- Great Mills (disambiguation)
