= De Phenix, Marrum =

Smock mill in Marrum, Friesland, Netherlands

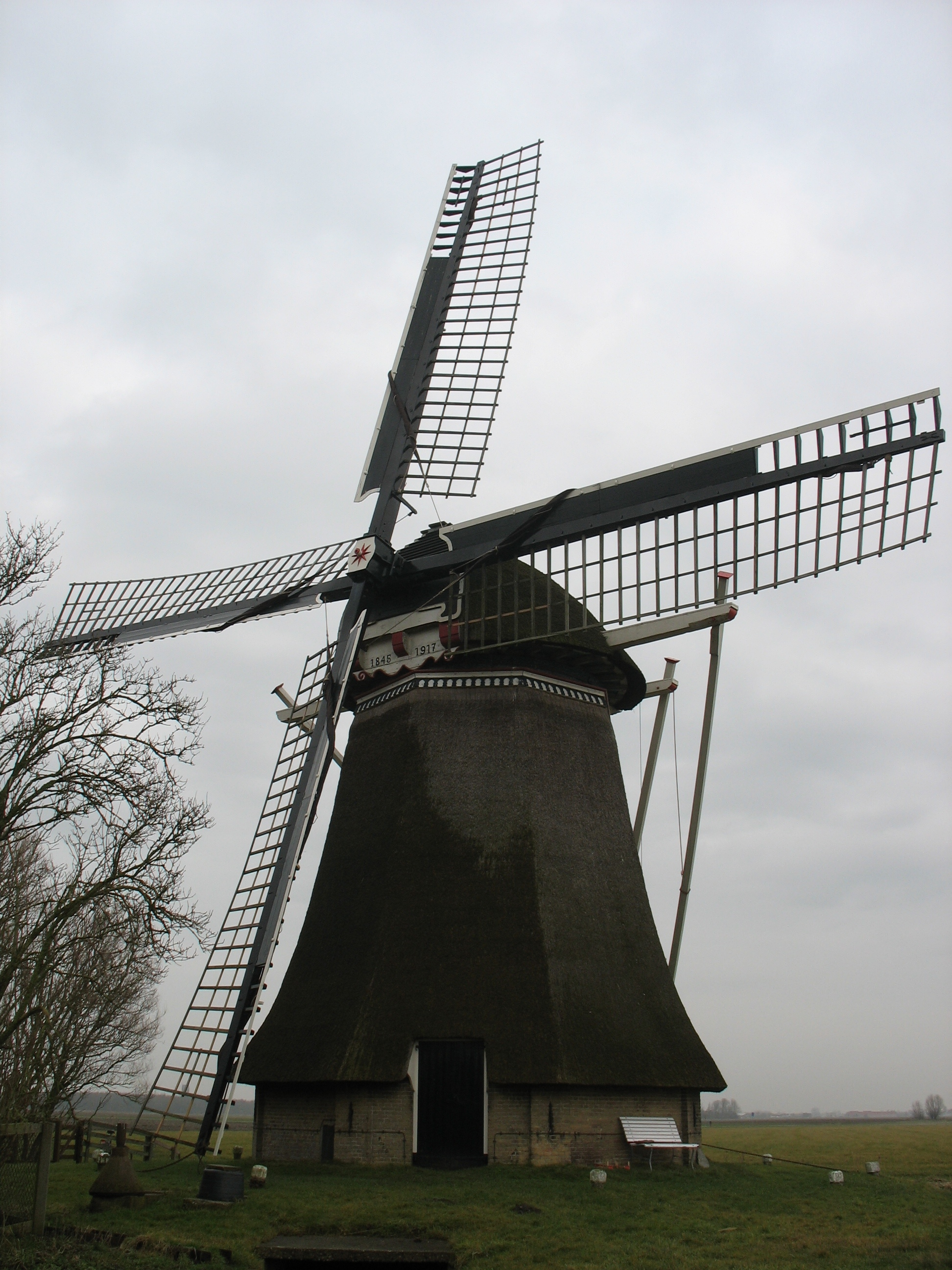
- De Phenix, February 2009.

Origin
- Mill name: De Phenix
- Mill location: Nieuweweg 3, 9073 GN Marrum
- Coordinates: 53.3208°N 5.8192°E
- Operator(s): Stichting De Fryske Mole
- Year built: 1917

Information
- Purpose: Drainage mill
- Type: Smock mill
- Storeys: Two-storey smock
- Base storeys: Single-storey base
- No. of sails: Four sails
- Type of sails: Common sails
- Windshaft: Cast iron
- Winding: Tailpole and winch
- Auxiliary power: Diesel engine
- Type of pump: Archimedes' screw

De Phenix (English: The Phoenix) is a smock mill in Marrum, Friesland, Netherlands which was built in 1917. The mill has been restored to working order and is used to train millers. It is listed as a Rijksmonument, number 15602.

== History ==
The first mill on this site was built by millwright J T Kingma of Ternaard in 1845. It drained the Ferwerd polder. In August 1916, it was struck by lightning and burnt down. To replace it, the sawmill De Phenix was moved from Leeuwarden. At one time, the mill was fitted with Patent sails. Auxiliary power was originally by a portable engine, later replaced by a Petter Mc Larren diesel engine. On 4 May 1976, the mill was sold to Stichting De Fryske Mole (English: Frisian Mills Foundation). New sails were fitted in 1977 and a new Archimedes' screw was fitted in 1983. Since 1977, the mill has been used as a training mill where millers can learn their craft. Further restoration work was carried out in 1997.

== Description ==
De Phenix is what the Dutch describe as a Grondzeiler. It is a two-storey smock mill on a single-storey base. There is no stage, the sails reaching almost to ground level. The mill is winded by tailpole and winch. The smock and cap are thatched. The sails are Common sails. They have a span of 21.50 metres (70 ft 6 in). The sails are carried on a cast-iron windshaft. which was cast by Prins van Oranje, The Hague, South Holland in 1888. The windshaft also carries the brake wheel which has 60 cogs. This drives the wallower (33 cogs) at the top of the upright shaft. At the bottom of the upright shaft the crown wheel, which has 39 cogs drives a gearwheel with 32 cogs on the axle of the Archimedes' screw. The axle of the Archimedes' screw is 480 millimetres (1 ft 7 in) diameter. The screw is 1.60 metres (5 ft 3 in) diameter and 5.30 metres (17 ft 5 in) long. It is inclined at 17°. Each revolution of the screw lifts 1,272 litres (280 imp gal) of water.

== Public access ==
De Phenix is open to the public by appointment.
