= Great Mills =

Great Mills may refer to:

- Great Mills (DIY), a large DIY chain in the United Kingdom bought by Focus in 2000
- Great Mills, Maryland, an unincorporated community in St. Mary's County, Maryland, United States
- Great Mills High School, a comprehensive public high school in Great Mills, Maryland

== See also ==
- Great Mill (disambiguation)
