= De Grote Molen, Marrum =

Windmill in Marrum, Netherlands

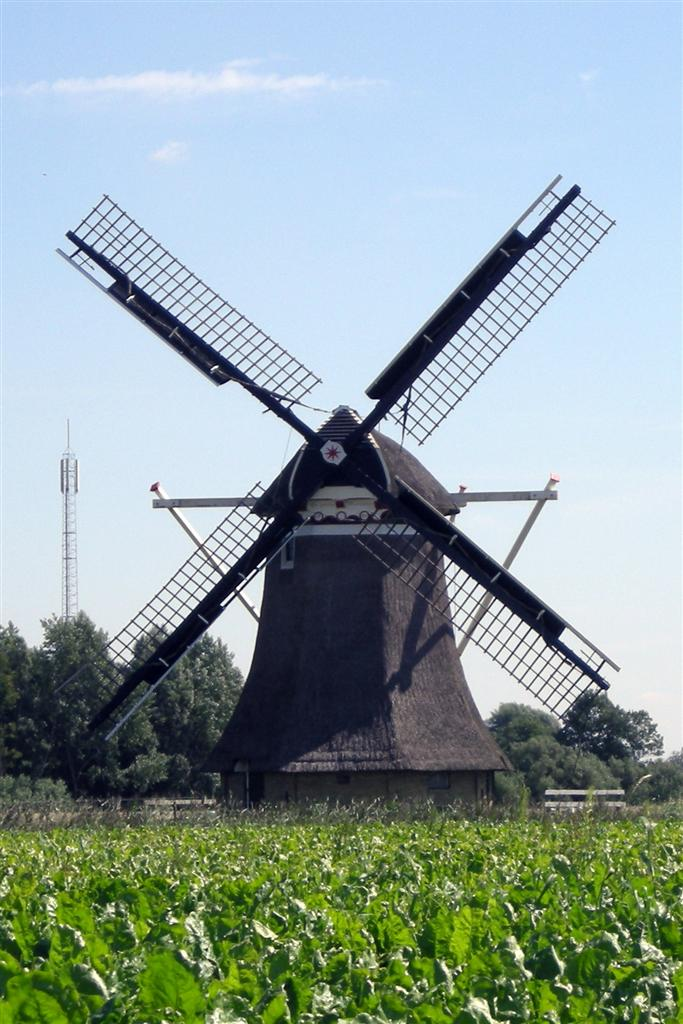
- De Grote Molen, August 2007.
- Interactive map of De Grote Molen, Marrum

Origin
- Mill name: De Grote Molen
- Mill location: Ljouwerterdyk 1, 9073 LP Marrum
- Coordinates: 53.3183°N 5.7967°E
- Operator: Stichting De Fryske Mole
- Year built: 1845

Information
- Purpose: Drainage mill
- Type: Smock mill
- Storeys: Two-storey smock
- Base storeys: Single-storey base
- No. of sails: Four sails
- Type of sails: Common sails, leading edges on the Fok System
- Windshaft: Cast iron
- Winding: Tailpole and winch
- Auxiliary power: Electric motor
- Type of pump: Archimedes' screw

De Grote Molen (English: The Great Mill) is a smock mill in Marrum, Friesland, Netherlands which was built in 1845. The mill has been restored to working order. It is listed as a Rijksmonument, number 15637.

== History ==
De Grote Molen was built by millwright J T Kingma of Ternaard in 1845 to drain the 2,100 pondemaat (770 ha; 1,900 acres) Marrum-Westernijtjerk polder. As built, the mill was fitted with Patent sails. Later, Common sails fitted with streamlined leading edges on the Dekker System were fitted. These were later replaced by Common sails with leading edges on the Fok system.

The mill was restored in 1957-58, 1965, and again in 1968. On 4 May 1976, the mill was sold to Stichting De Fryske Mole (English: Frisian Mills Foundation). A further restoration was undertaken in 1978-78. Auxiliary power is from an EMF Dordt electric motor.

== Description ==
De Grote Molen is what the Dutch describe as a Grondzeiler. It is a two-storey smock mill on a single-storey base. There is no stage, the sails reaching almost to ground level. The mill is winded by tailpole and winch. The smock and cap are thatched. The sails are Common sails, fitted with leading edges on the Fok system. They have a span of 22.80 metres (74 ft 10 in). The sails are carried on a cast-iron windshaft. which was cast by Prins van Oranje, The Hague, South Holland in 1868. The windshaft also carries the brake wheel which has 65 cogs. This drives the wallower (33 cogs) at the top of the upright shaft. At the bottom of the upright shaft the crown wheel, which has 49 cogs drives a gearwheel with 45 cogs on the axle of the Archimedes' screw. The axle of the Archimedes' screw is 655 millimetres (2 ft 2 in) diameter. The screw is 1.72 metres (5 ft 8 in) diameter and 2.02 metres (6 ft 8 in) long. It is inclined at 19°. Each revolution of the screw lifts 1,744 litres (384 imp gal) of water.

== Public access ==
De Grote Molen is open to the public by appointment.
