= De Kleilânsmole, Marrum =

Windmill in Marrum, Netherlands

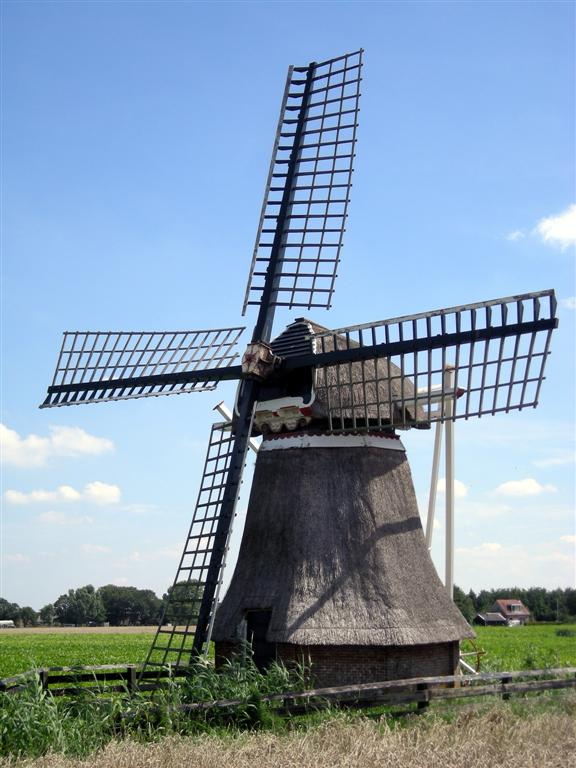
- De Kleilânsmole, August 2007.
- Interactive map of De Kleilânsmole, Marrum

Origin
- Mill name: De Kleilânsmole
- Mill location: Hoge Herenweg nabij nr. 14, 9073 TT Marrum
- Coordinates: 53.3228°N 5.7781°E
- Operator: Stichting De Fryske Mole
- Year built: 1865

Information
- Purpose: Drainage mill
- Type: Smock mill
- Storeys: Two-storey smock
- Base storeys: Single-storey base
- No. of sails: Four sails
- Type of sails: Common sails
- Windshaft: Cast iron
- Winding: Tailpole and winch
- Auxiliary power: Electric motor
- Type of pump: Archimedes' screw
- Year lost: 2010

De Kleilânsmole was a smock mill which formerly stood in Marrum, Friesland, Netherlands and which was built in 1865 and dismantled in 2010. The mill had been restored as a landmark. The mill was listed as a Rijksmonument, number 15597.

== History ==
De Kleilânsmole was built in 1865 to drain the 2,100 pondemaat (770 ha; 1,900 acres) De Traan polder. Until 1947, there were two Archimedes' screw, enabling the mill to drain and fill its polder. These were replaced by an electrically driven pump. The mill was restored in 1974 and on 4 May 1976, the mill was sold to Stichting De Fryske Mole (English: Frisian Mills Society). It is planned to move De Kleilânsmole to Ferwerd to replace De Non (English: The Nun), which burnt down in 1990. At Ferwerd, the mill will be restored to full working order. In 2010, the mill was dismantled by Bouwbedrijf Kolthof, Marrum and is currently at the millwright's workshop where it is being restored.

== Description ==
Kleilânsmole was what the Dutch describe as a Grondzeiler. It was a two-storey smock mill on a single-storey base. There was no stage, the sails reaching almost to ground level. The mill was winded by tailpole and winch. The smock and cap were thatched. The sails were Common sails. They had a span of 12.70 metres (41 ft 8 in). The sails were carried on a cast-iron windshaft. which was cast by H J Koning, Foxham, Groningen in 1908. The mill was latterly devoid of machinery. The Archimedes' screw formerly fitted to the mill lifted 542 litres (119 imp gal) of water per revolution.
