= Makkinga =

Makkinga Makkingea
- Village
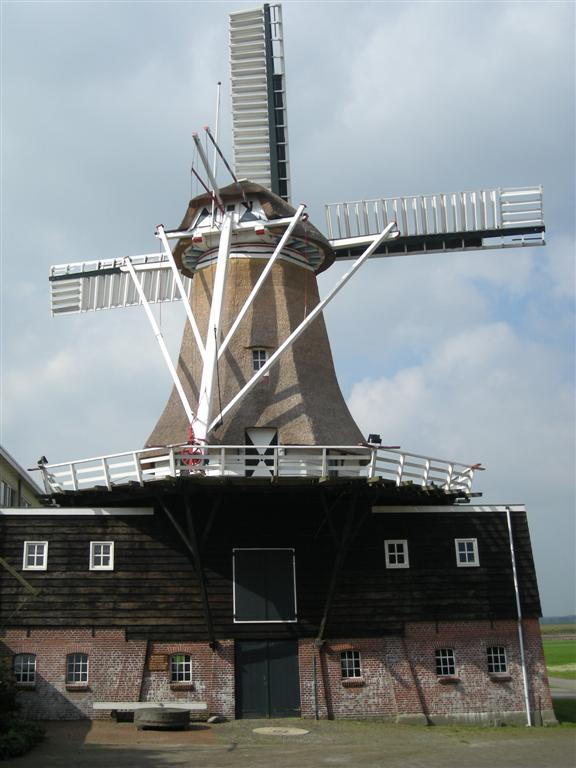
- Windmill De Weyert

- Flag

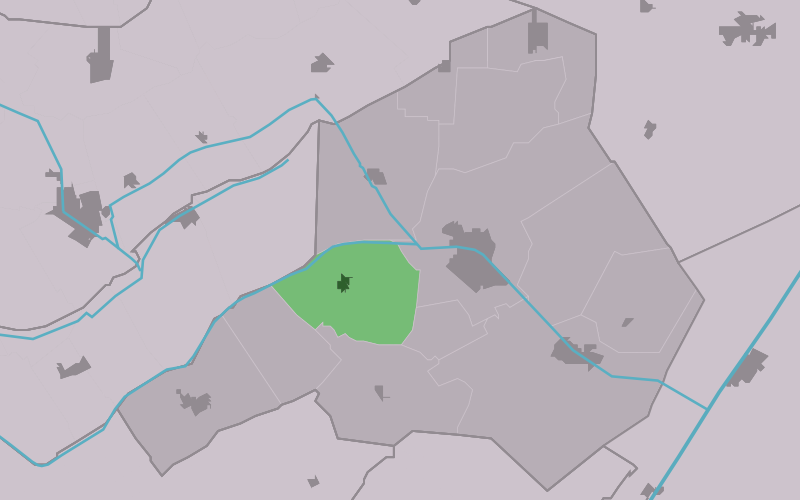
- Location in Ooststellingwerf municipality

- Location in the Netherlands Makkinga (Netherlands)
- Country: Netherlands
- Province: Friesland
- Municipality: Ooststellingwerf

Area
  - Total: 16.59 km^{2} (6.41 sq mi)
- Elevation: 5 m (16 ft)

Population (2021)
  - Total: 1,020
  - Density: 61.5/km^{2} (159/sq mi)
- Time zone: UTC+1 (CET)
  - Summer (DST): UTC+2 (CEST)
- Postal code: 8423
- Dialing code: 0516

Makkinga (West Frisian: Makkingea) is a village in the Dutch municipality of Ooststellingwerf in the province of Friesland. On 1 January 2017, it had 1,040 inhabitants.

Makkinga is known among transportation planners and engineers as the first community to introduce the concept of shared space, which means the removal of traffic controls in the high street to encourage safer interaction between vehicles and pedestrians.

== History ==
The village was first mentioned in 1527 Mackinge(n) and means "settlement of the people of Makke (person)". Makkinga is a peat excavation village with a similar shape as an esdorp but without a communal pasture. It started to developed from the 15th century onwards. The Dutch Reformed church dates from 1777 and is a replacement of an earlier church.

Makkinga was home to 294 people in 1840. Between 1848 until 1886, it was the capital of the Ooststellingwerf municipality.

== Attractions ==
In Makkinga, the Old Ark museum is devoted to old tools. There is a restored windmill, De Weyert, in the village. It was originally built in 1868 as a sawmill in Gorredijk. In 1925, it was moved to Makkinga and converted to a gristmill. On the last Saturday of the month from March to October, a large flea market is organized in the village.

== Gallery ==
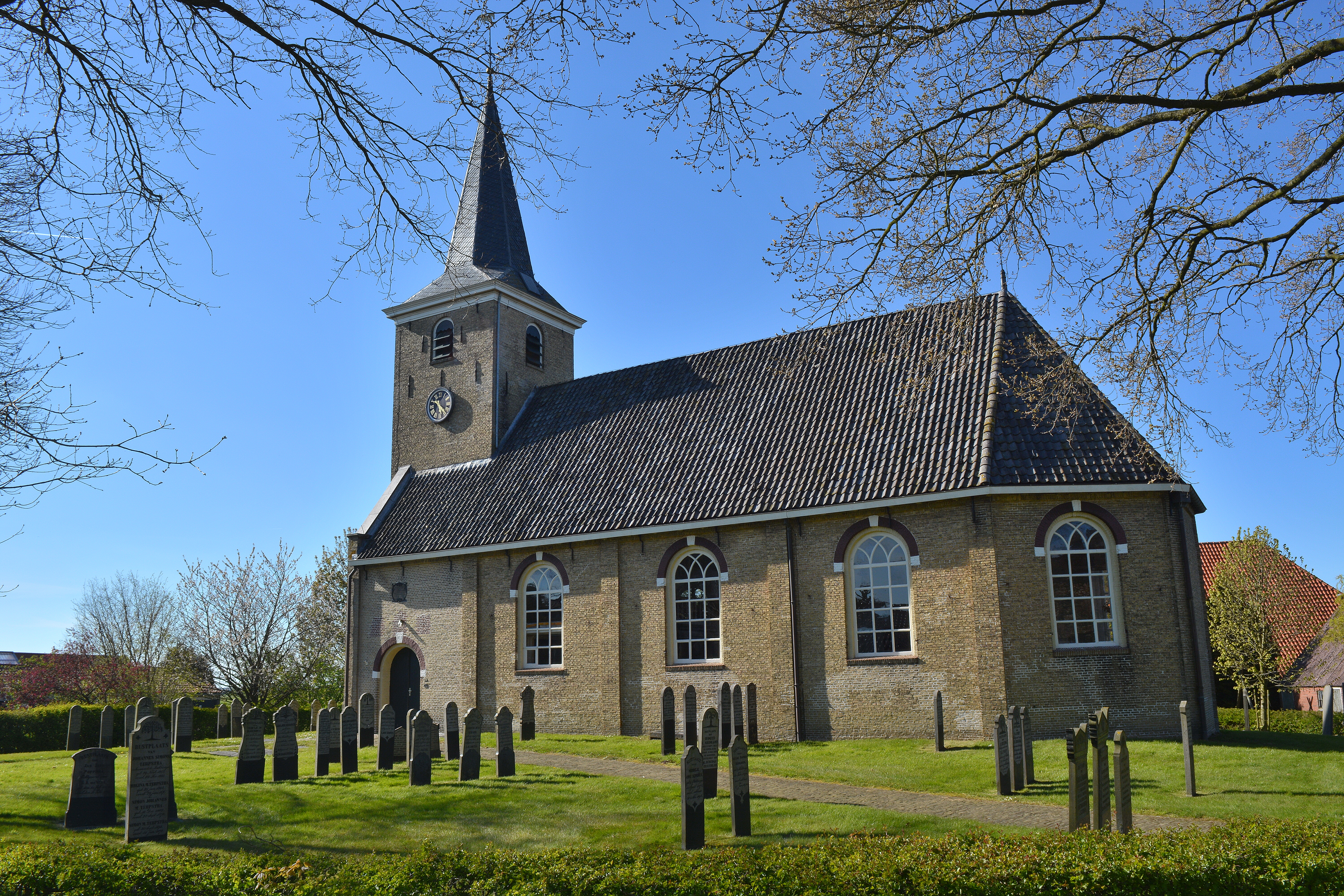
Church of Makkinga

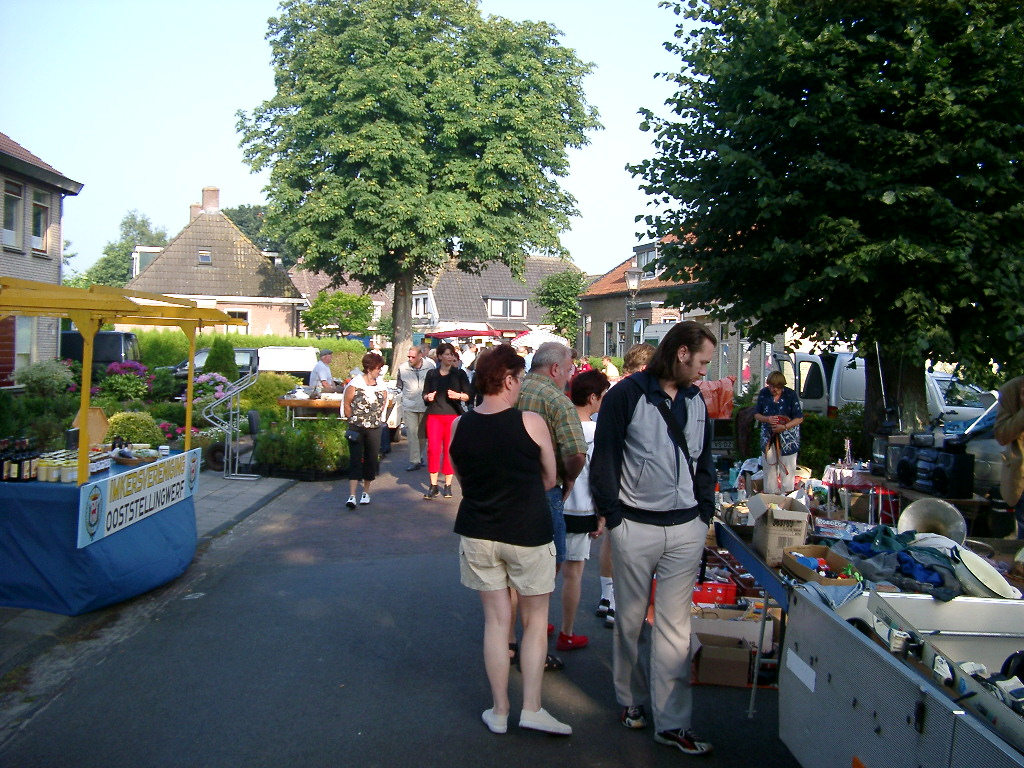
Flea market

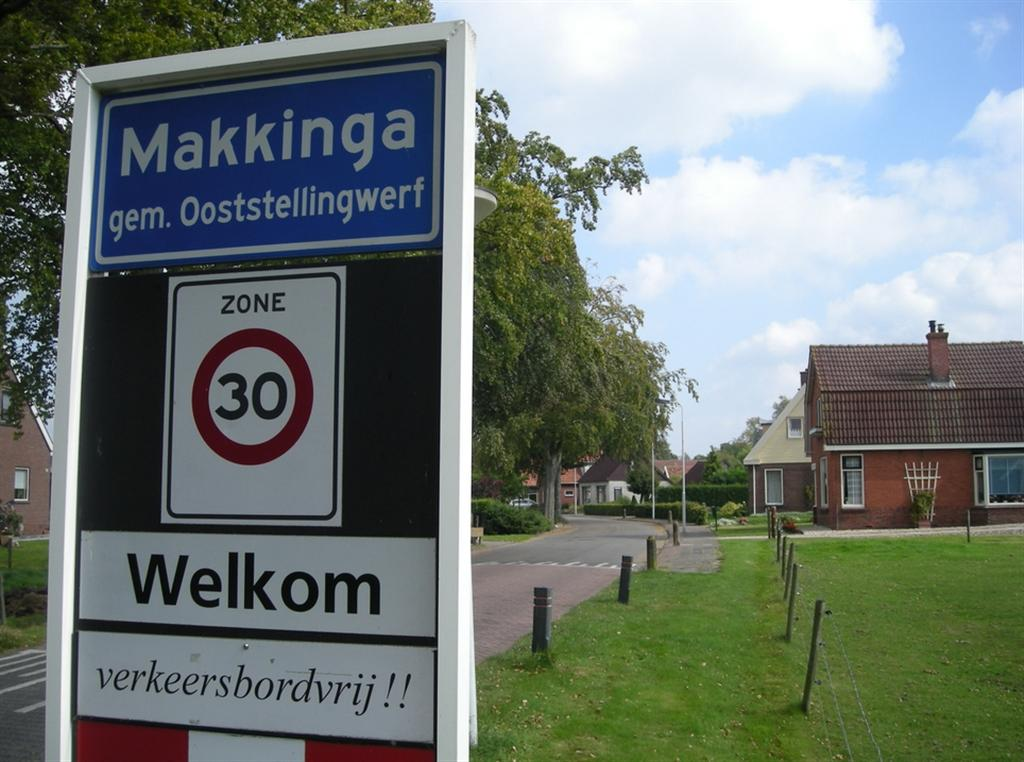
Welcome to Makkinga

== Notable residents ==
- Jan Kromkamp (born 1980), footballer
