= Froskepôlemolen =

Smock mill in the Netherlands

Froskepôlemolen, Leeuwarden
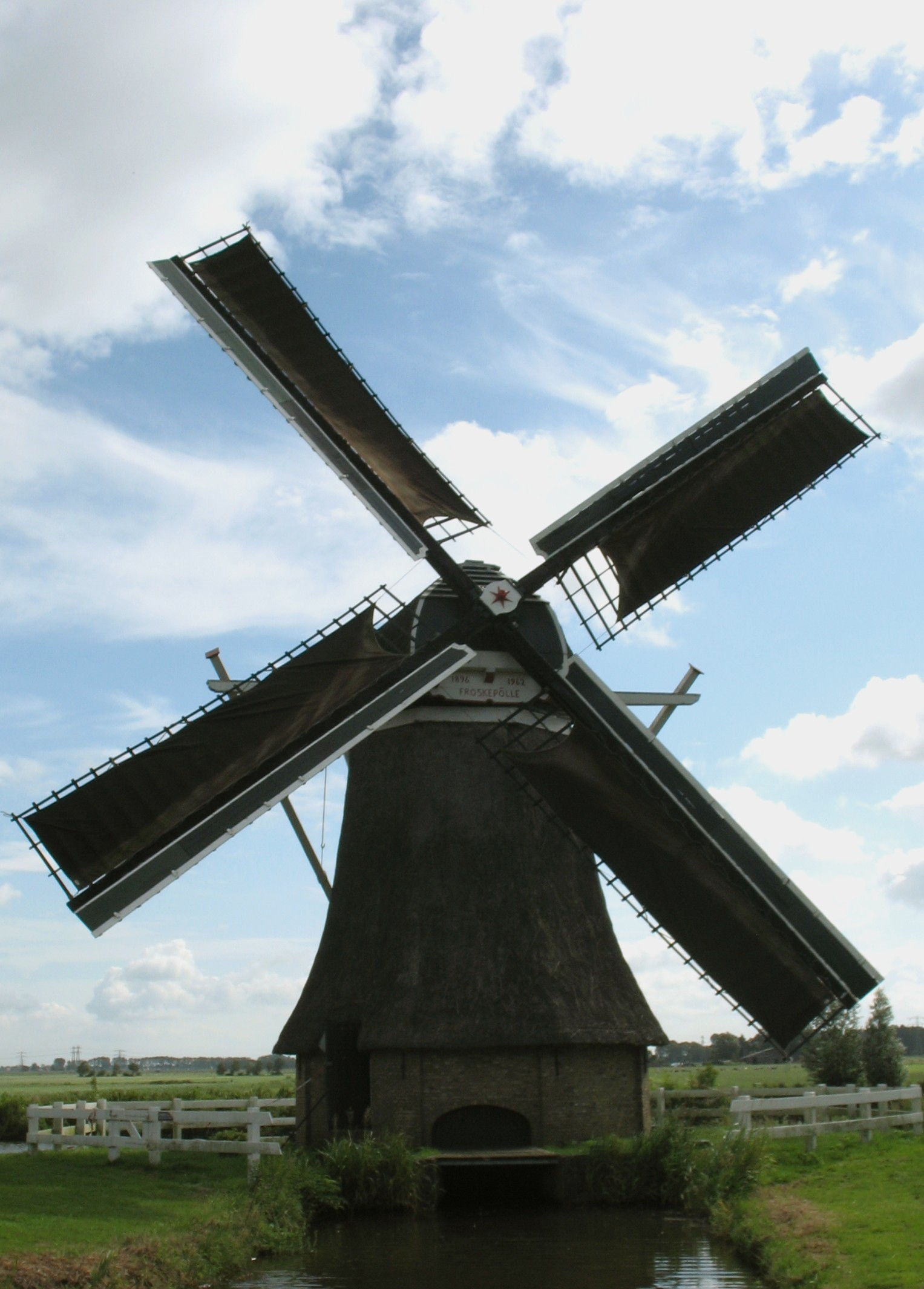
- Froskepôlemolen, August 2008.

Origin
- Mill name: Froskepôlemolen
- Mill location: De Froskepôle, Leeuwarden
- Coordinates: 53°11′22″N 5°51′10″E
- Operator(s): Gemeente Leeuwarden
- Year built: 1962

Information
- Purpose: Drainage mill
- Type: Smock mill
- Storeys: Three-storey smock
- Base storeys: Single-storey base
- No. of sails: Four sails
- Type of sails: Common sails
- Windshaft: Cast iron
- Winding: Tailpole and winch
- Auxiliary power: electric motor
- Type of pump: Archimedes' screw
- Other information: Name often misspelled as "Froskepôllemolen"

Froskepôlemolen is a smock mill in Leeuwarden, Friesland, Netherlands which dates from 1896 but was rebuilt on its present site in 1962. The mill has been restored to working order and is listed as a Rijksmonument, number 24507.

== History ==
Froskepôlemolen was originally built in 1896 on the De Zwette waterway, where it was known as De Zwettemolen. It drained the Het Huizumer and the Goutumer Nieuwland polders, which had an area of 350 hectares (860 acres) between them. The mill had patent sails on both stocks, but by 1940 was working on one pair of sails. By 1962, the mill had been surrounded by industrial buildings and it was moved to a new position within Leeuwarden. This was done by loading the mill body onto two barges and transporting it along the Van Harinxmakanaal. The cost of the move was estimated at ƒ42.000; the work was done by millwright A de Roos. The restoration of the mill was complete in 1966, and a further restoration was undertaken in 1982-83; the thatch on the mill was renewed in October 2009. The mill is owned by the Gemeente (municipality) of Leeuwarden.

== Description ==
Froskepôlemolen is what the Dutch describe as a Grondzeiler. It is a three-storey smock mill on a single-storey base. There is no stage, the sails reaching almost to ground level. The mill is winded by tailpole and winch. The smock and cap are thatched. The sails are Common sails. They have a span of 17.80 metres (58 ft 5 in). The sails are carried on a cast-iron windshaft. The windshaft also carries the brake wheel which has 45 cogs. This drives the wallower (24 cogs) at the top of the upright shaft. At the bottom of the upright shaft the crown wheel, which has 33 cogs drives a gearwheel with 28 cogs on the axle of the Archimedes' screw. The axle of the Archimedes' screw is 360 millimetres (1 ft 2 in) diameter. The screw is 1.50 metres (4 ft 11 in) diameter. It is inclined at 26°. Each revolution of the screw lifts 753 litres (166 imp gal) of water.

== Public access ==
Froskepôlemolen is open to the public by appointment.
