= Jan Kromkamp =

Dutch football manager (born 1980)

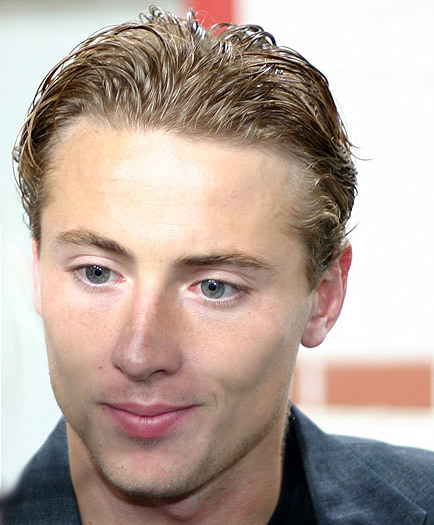

Personal information
- Full name: Jan Kromkamp
- Date of birth: 17 August 1980 (age 46)
- Place of birth: Makkinga, Netherlands
- Height: 1.84 m (6 ft 0 in)
- Position: Right-back

Team information
- Current team: CSV Apeldoorn (manager)

Youth career
- AGOVV

Senior career*
Years	Team	Apps	(Gls)
1998–2000	Go Ahead Eagles	61	(5)
2000–2005	AZ	133	(7)
2005–2006	Villarreal	6	(0)
2006	Liverpool	14	(0)
2006–2011	PSV	68	(2)
2011–2013	Go Ahead Eagles	34	(0)
Total		316	(14)

International career
2004–2006	Netherlands	11	(0)

Managerial career
- 2020–: CSV Apeldoorn
- * Club domestic league appearances and goals

Jan Kromkamp (born 17 August 1980) is a Dutch former professional footballer who played as a right-back. He currently manages CSV Apeldoorn.

Kromkamp played a total of 201 games in the Eredivisie and scored eight goals in nine seasons, playing for both AZ and PSV. He also played in England and Spain, and started and finished his career at Go Ahead Eagles.

Kromkamp was included in the Netherlands squad for the 2006 World Cup.

== Club career ==
=== Early years, AZ ===
Born in Makkinga, Friesland, Kromkamp made his professional debut for Go Ahead Eagles in Eerste Divisie, his first appearance in the competition being on 12 September 1998 in a 3–0 home win against FC Top Oss. He played two full seasons with the team, scoring four goals in 33 games in his second.

Kromkamp moved to the Eredivisie with AZ for the 2000–01 campaign, being a regular first-team starter right away. In his fourth year he appeared in 34 league matches as the Alkmaar side finished fourth, thus qualifying for the UEFA Cup and reaching the semifinals in the continental competition.

=== Villarreal, Liverpool ===
At the start of the 2005–06 season, Kromkamp signed with Villarreal of Spain. On 29 December 2005, however, the La Liga club agreed on an exchange deal with Liverpool, with Josemi going in the opposite direction.

Kromkamp made his debut for the Reds on 7 January 2006, in a 5–3 win over Luton Town in the third round of the FA Cup. During his stint at Anfield, however, he was unable to dislodge Irish international Steve Finnan from the starting lineup, but did make a number of appearances from the bench, most notably in the domestic cup final; he was described as being a fair crosser of the ball with a lack of pace, who had difficulty in stopping opposition wingers getting crosses in.

=== PSV, later career ===
Kromkamp played one league game for Liverpool in the 2006–07 season. On 31 August 2006, he was sold to PSV Eindhoven, taking over the number 2 jersey from André Ooijer who left for Blackburn Rovers. He appeared in 54 league games in his first two seasons combined, both ending in League championship wins, and also faced former club Liverpool in two UEFA Champions League matches, PSV managing only one draw in four games.

From 2008 to 2010, Kromkamp played rarely due to injuries. On 22 February 2011, he rejoined his first professional team, Go Ahead Eagles – effective as of July – again in the second division.

On 23 June 2013, aged 33, Kromkamp announced his retirement from professional football due to chronic knee problems.

== International career ==
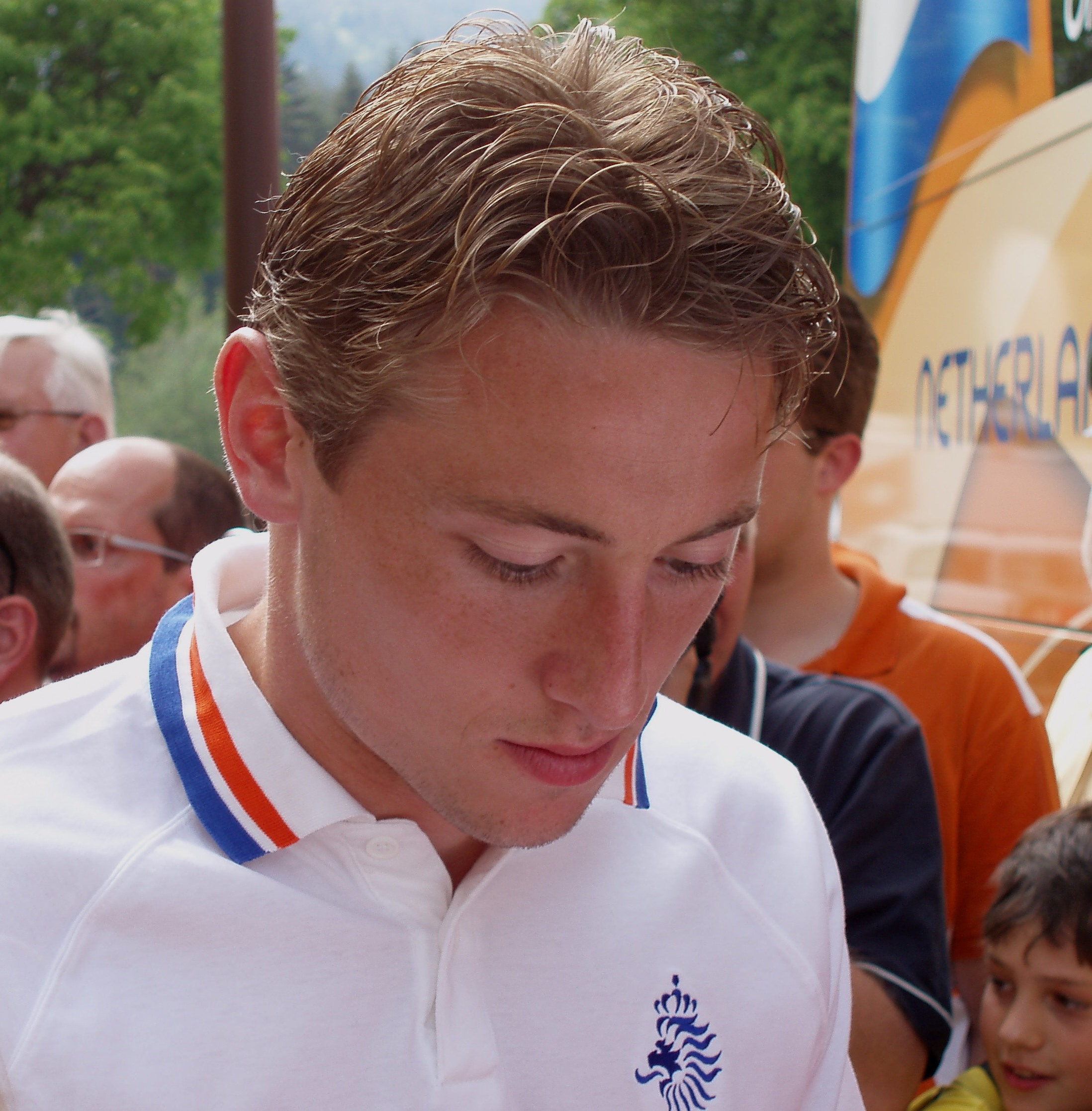
Kromkamp in 2006

Kromkamp was first called up by the Dutch national team under coach Marco van Basten. He won his first cap on 18 August 2004 in a 2–2 draw in a friendly against Sweden and in the following year he established himself as the first-choice right-back.

Shortly after Kromkamp's move to Liverpool, however, van Basten admitted that he would rather see the player appear more regularly for his club – labelling the transfer as a bad move. Kromkamp hit back at this criticism by saying that he was very pleased to have joined Liverpool and that he would work hard to make it into van Basten's 2006 FIFA World Cup squad; in May 2006 the manager announced his final list of 23, which included Kromkamp, although he was not used during the tournament itself.

== Career statistics ==
=== Club ===
Appearances and goals by club, season and competition
Club	Season	League			National cup (Note: Includes KNVB Cup, FA Cup)		Europe		Other		Total	
Club	Season	Division	Apps	Goals	Apps	Goals	Apps	Goals	Apps	Goals	Apps	Goals
Go Ahead Eagles	1998–99	Eerste Divisie	28	1	0	0	—		—		28	1
Go Ahead Eagles	1999–2000	Eerste Divisie	33	4	0	0	—		—		33	4
Go Ahead Eagles	Total		61	5	0	0	—		—		61	5
AZ Alkmaar	2000–01	Eredivisie	25	2	4	0	—		—		29	2
AZ Alkmaar	2001–02	Eredivisie	22	1	3	1	—		—		25	2
AZ Alkmaar	2002–03	Eredivisie	25	2	2	0	—		—		27	2
AZ Alkmaar	2003–04	Eredivisie	34	0	2	0	—		—		36	0
AZ Alkmaar	2004–05	Eredivisie	27	1	1	0	12 (Note: Appearances in UEFA Cup)	0	—		40	1
AZ Alkmaar	Total		133	6	12	1	12	0	—		157	7
Villarreal	2005–06	La Liga	6	0	0	0	5 (Note: Appearances in UEFA Champions League)	0	—		11	0
Liverpool	2005–06	Premier League	13	0	4	0	0	0	—		17	0
Liverpool	2006–07	Premier League	1	0	0	0	0	0	—		1	0
Liverpool	Total		14	0	4	0	0	0	—		18	0
PSV	2006–07	Eredivisie	28	0	3	0	8	1	0	0	39	1
PSV	2007–08	Eredivisie	26	1	1	0	9 (Note: Four appearances in UEFA Champions League, five appearances in UEFA Cup)	0	1 (Note: Appearance in Johan Cruyff Shield)	0	37	1
PSV	2008–09	Eredivisie	12	0	2	0	2	0	0	0	16	0
PSV	2009–10	Eredivisie	2	0	0	0	2 (Note: Appearances in UEFA Europa League)	0	—		4	0
PSV	2010–11	Eredivisie	0	0	0	0	0	0	—		0	0
PSV	Total		68	1	6	0	21	1	1	0	96	2
Go Ahead Eagles	2011–12	Eerste Divisie	26	0	3	0	—		0	0	29	0
Go Ahead Eagles	2012–13	Eerste Divisie	8	0	2	0	—		4 (Note: Appearances in Eerste Divisie promotion play-offs)	0	14	0
Go Ahead Eagles	Total		34	0	5	0	—		4	0	43	0
Career total			316	12	27	1	38	1	5	0	386	14

=== International ===
Appearances and goals by national team and year
National team	Year	Apps	Goals
Netherlands	2004	1	0
Netherlands	2005	7	0
Netherlands	2006	3	0
Total		11	0

== Honours ==
Liverpool

- FA Cup: 2005–06

PSV

- Eredivisie: 2006–07, 2007–08
