= Marrum =

- Village
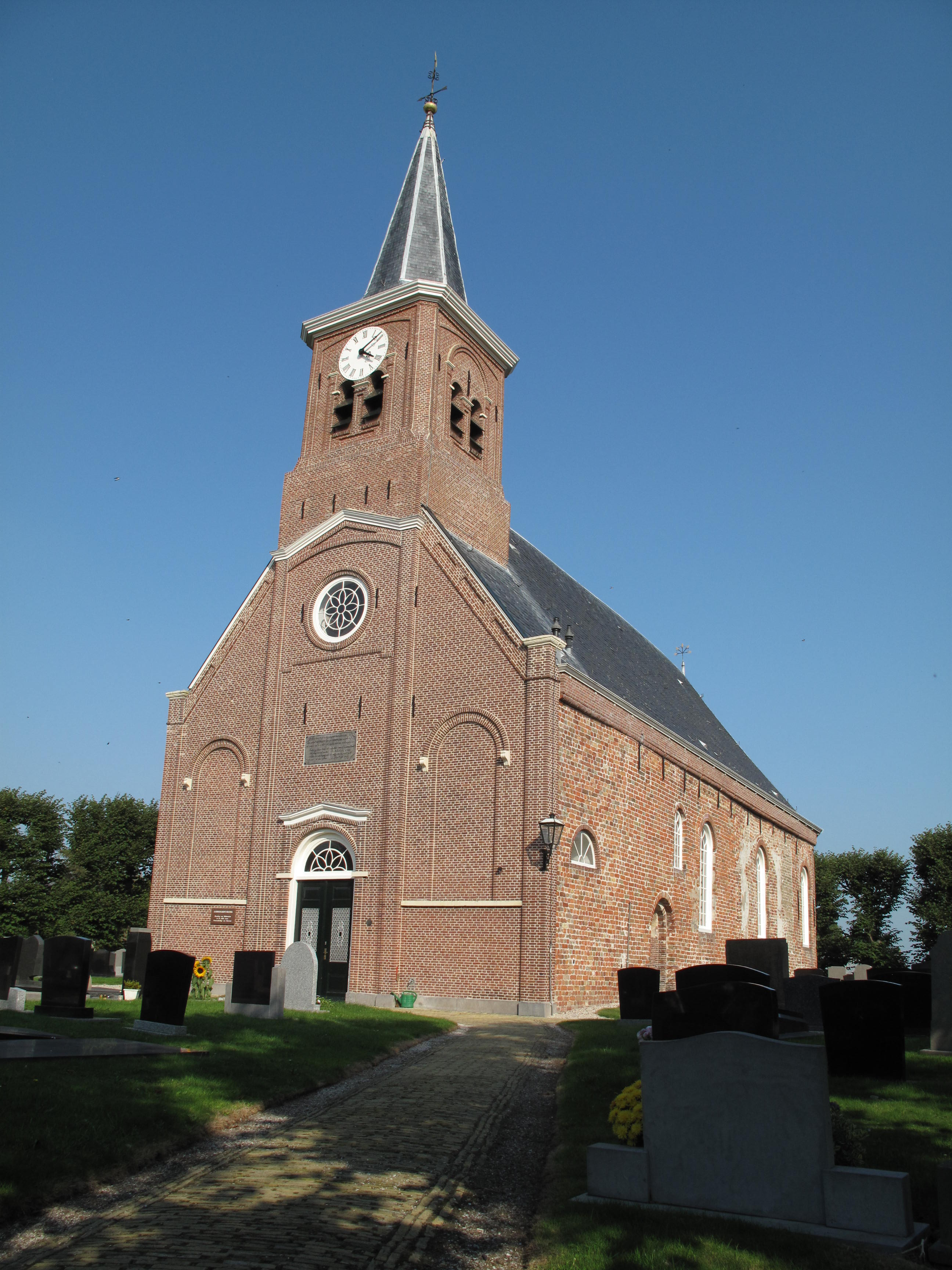
- Marrum church

- Flag Coat of arms

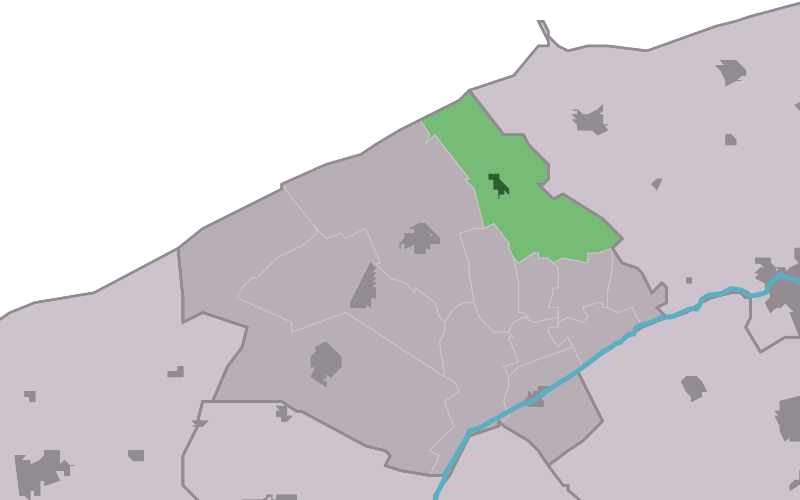
- Location in the former Ferwerderadiel municipality

- Location in the Netherlands Marrum (Netherlands)
- Country: Netherlands
- Province: Friesland
- Municipality: Noardeast-Fryslân

Population (2017)
  - Total: 1,462
- Time zone: UTC+1 (CET)
  - Summer (DST): UTC+2 (CEST)
- Postal code: 9073
- Telephone area: 0518
- Website: Official

Marrum is a village in Noardeast-Fryslân municipality in the province of Friesland, the Netherlands. It had a population of around 1,462 in January 2017. Before 2019, the village was part of the Ferwerderadiel municipality.

== 2006 horse rescue operation ==
In 2006, following a storm, nearly 100 horses were stranded on a small mud island. Eventually, they were rescued after seven women equestrians organised by Norma Miedema through an internet forum rode out through the water and then rode back leading the horses to safety (Susan Fransen riding Blizzard, Micky Nijboer riding Berber, Antje Dijkstra riding Humphrey, Hinke Lap riding Guinever, Christina Stormer riding Perfeft, and Fardow de Rueter riding King). A memorial was subsequently erected to mark the bravery and ingenuity of these women.

== Windmills ==
There are two windmills in Marrum, De Grote Molen and De Phenix. A third mill, De Kleilânsmole, was dismantled in 2010 for restoration and rebuilding at Ferwert.

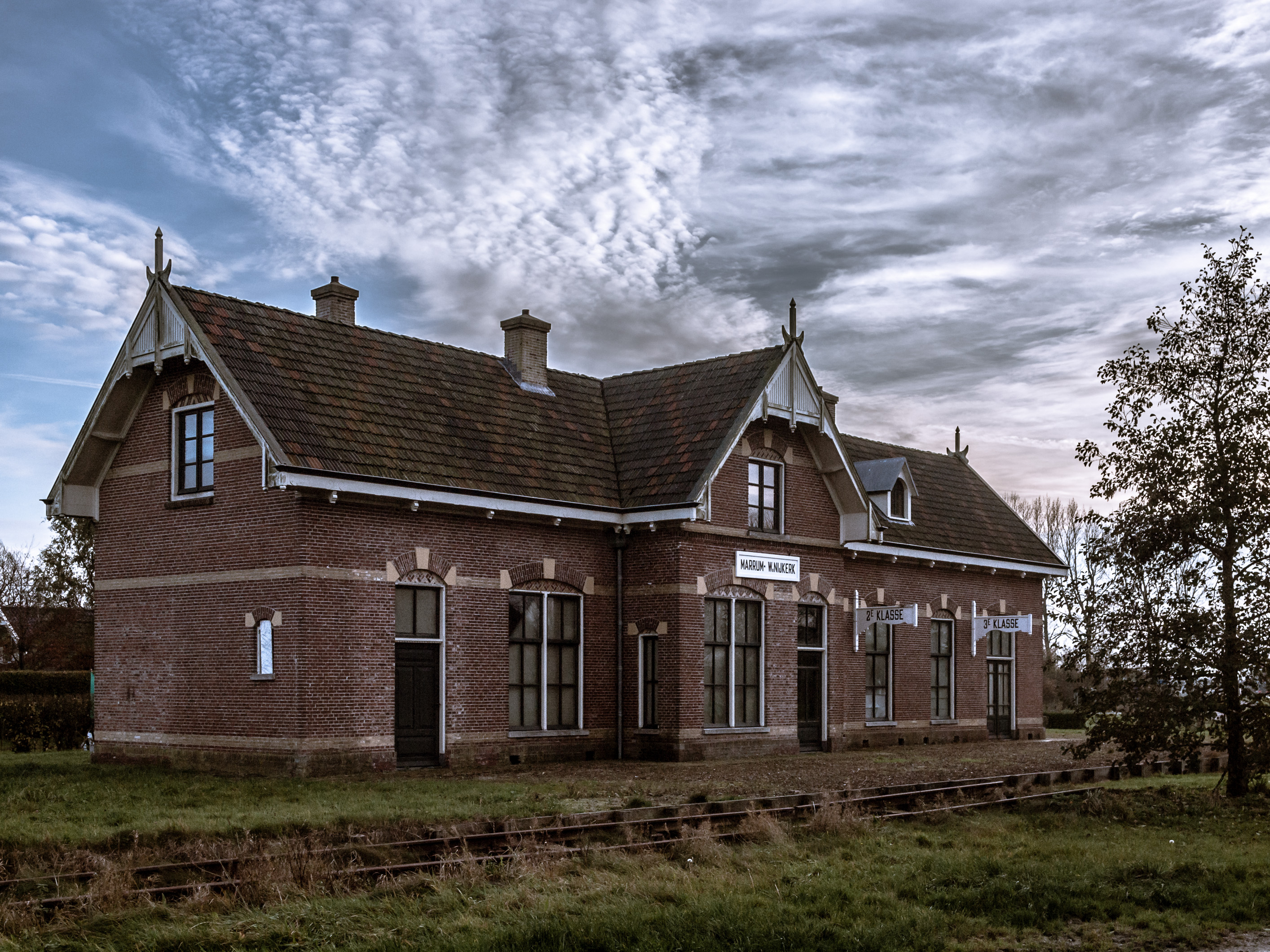
Former railwaystation

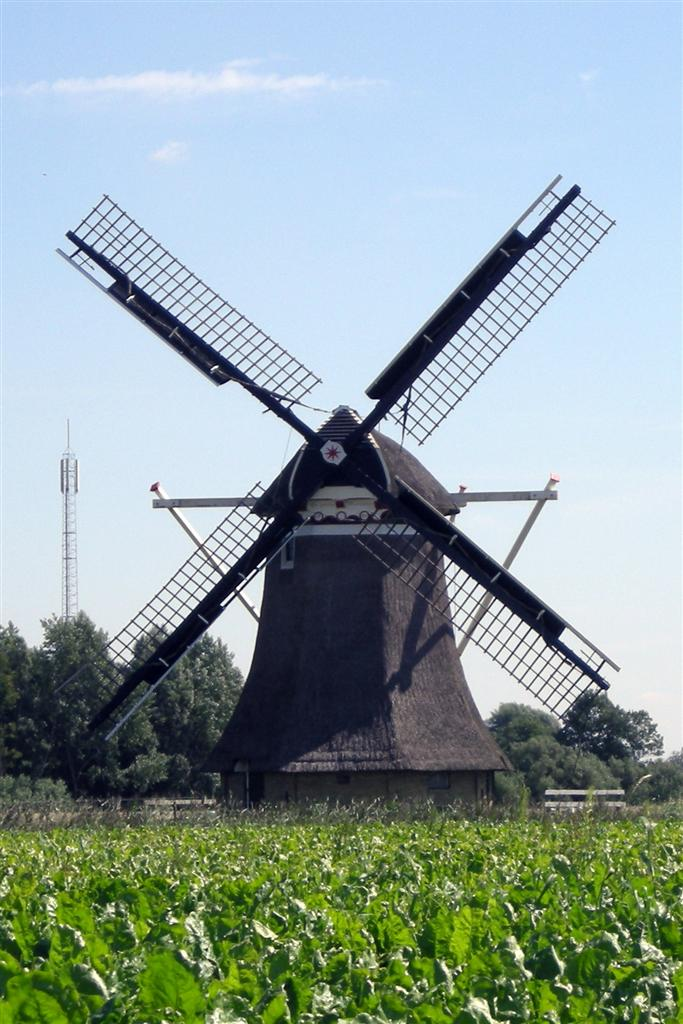
De Grote molen

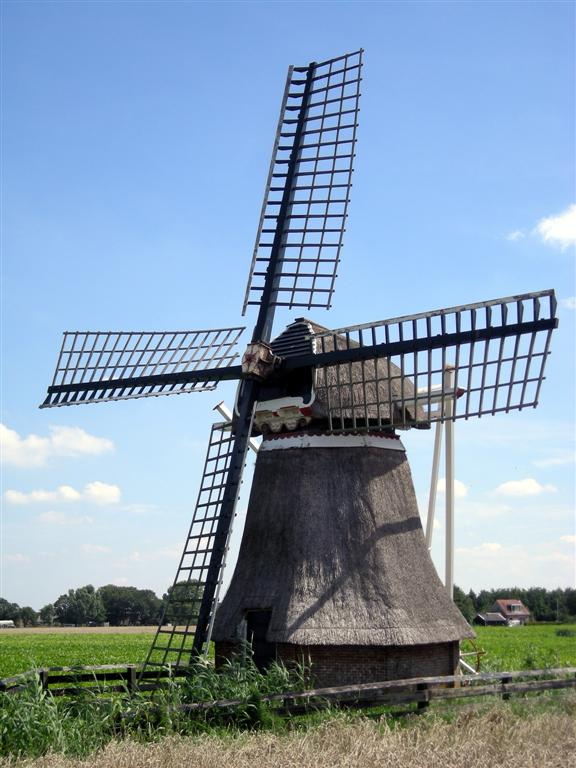
De Kleilânsmole

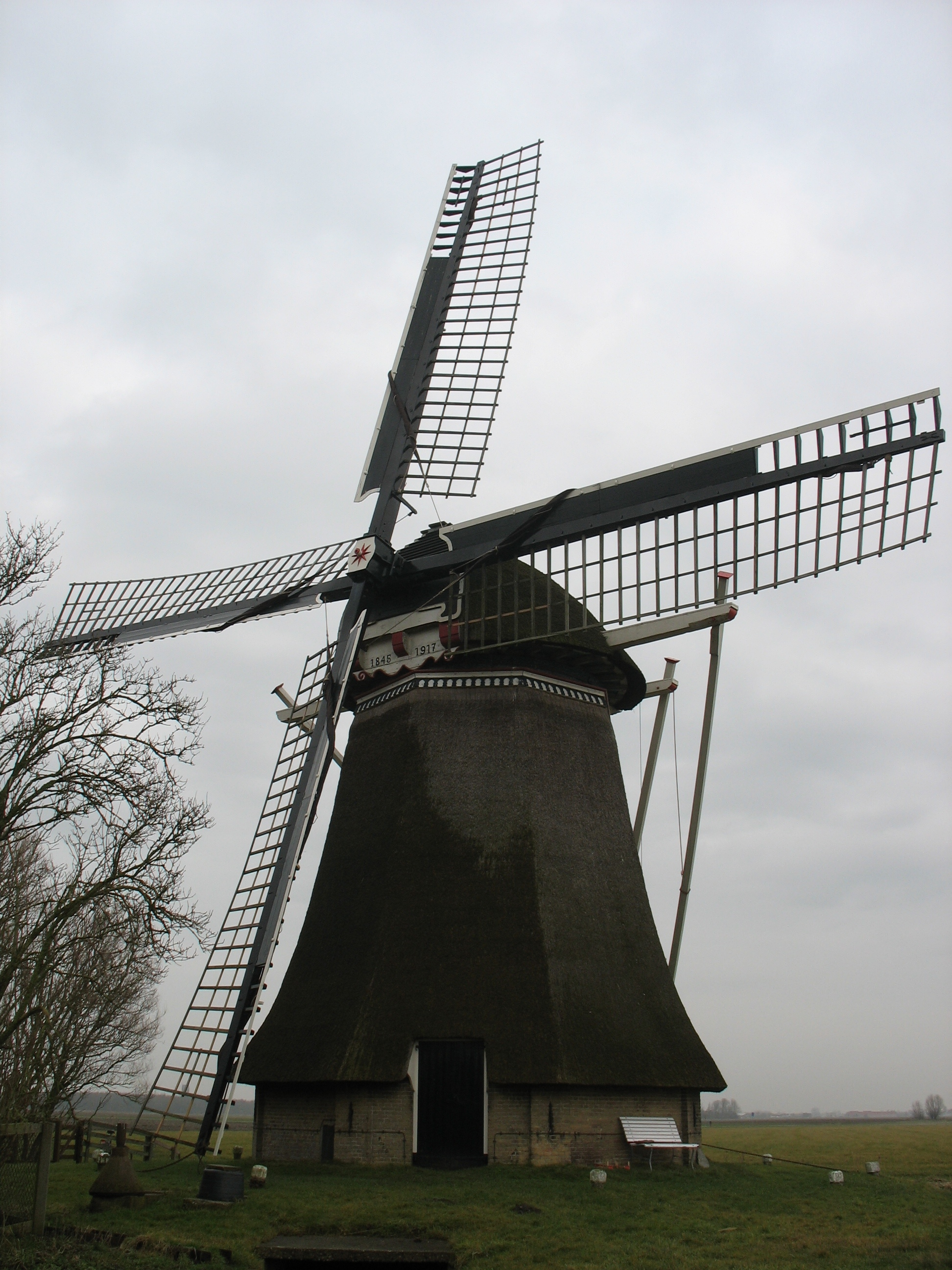
De Phenix
