= Ternaard =

- Village
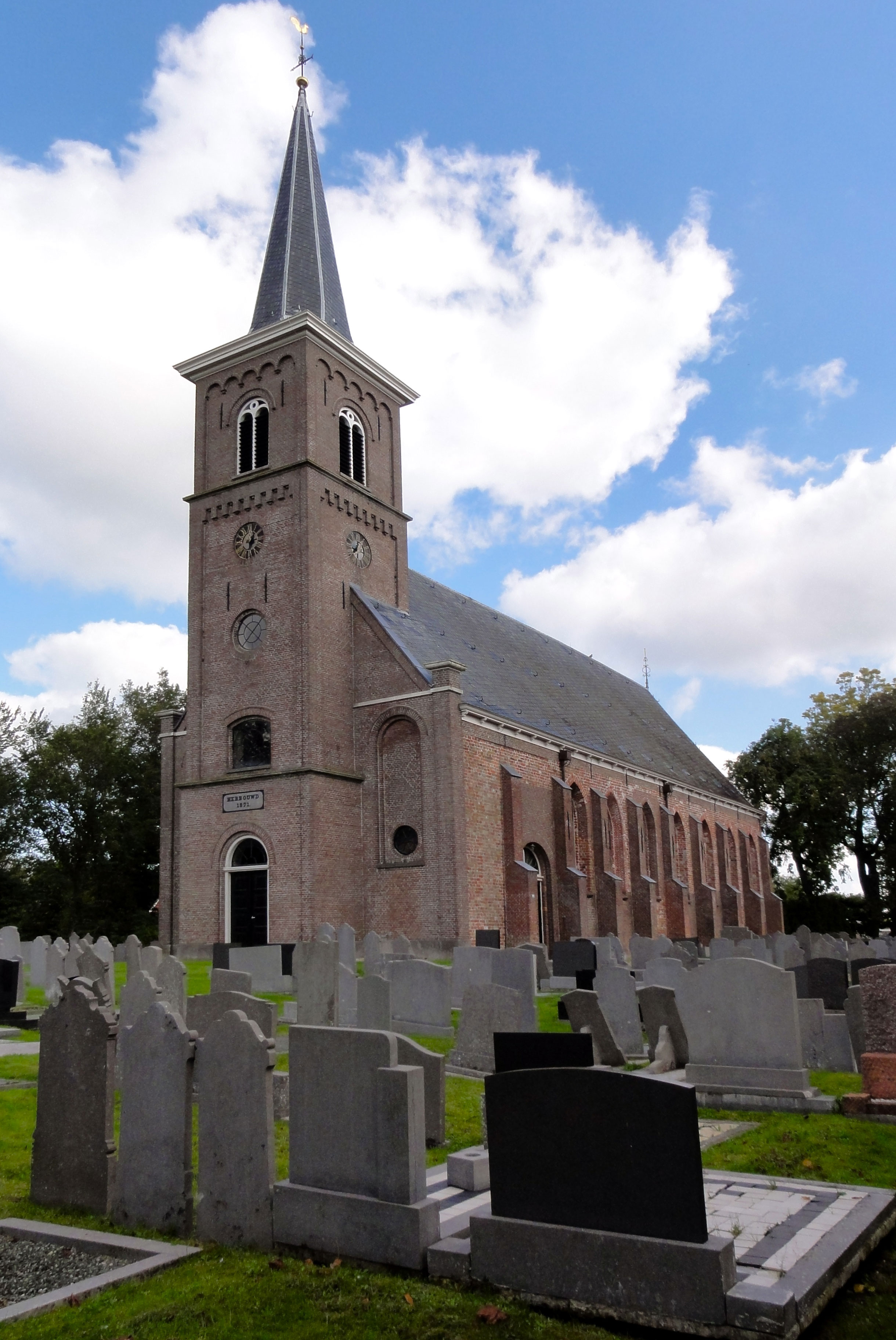
- Ternaard church

- Flag Coat of arms

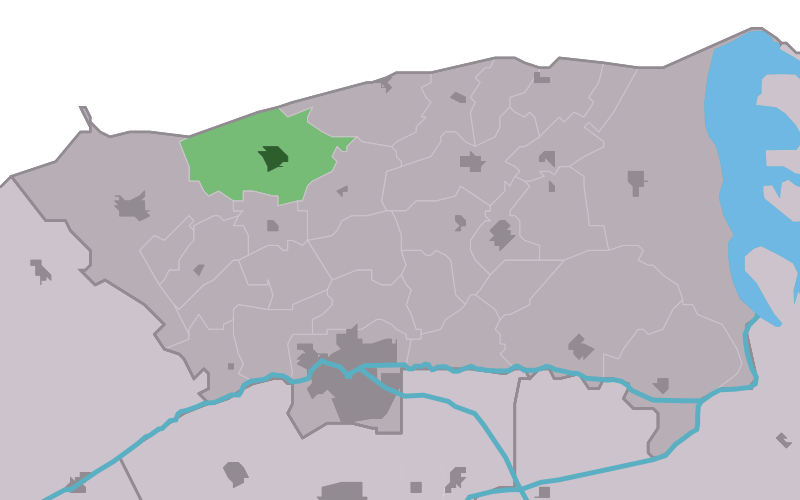
- Location in the former Dongeradeel municipality

- Location in the Netherlands Ternaard (Netherlands)
- Country: Netherlands
- Province: Friesland
- Municipality: Noardeast-Fryslân

Population (2017)
  - Total: 1,380
- Time zone: UTC+1 (CET)
  - Summer (DST): UTC+2 (CEST)
- Postal code: 9145
- Telephone area: 0519
- Website: Official

Ternaard is a village in the municipality Noardeast-Fryslân located in the northeast of the province of Friesland between Dokkum and the Wadden Sea. It is the third most populous village in the municipality and had a population of 1,380 in January 2017.

== History ==
Between 819 and c. 825 Ternaard was first mentioned. It was called "Tununfurt" . Later also the names Tunawert, Thunewerd, Tonauwer, Tijnnawerdt, Tennaard were used. The words "Furt", "Wert" and "werdt" were synonyms for "wierde", a manmade hill. What Tunun means is unknown.

Ternaard previously belonged to the municipality Westdongeradeel. The mayor of the municipality lived in Ternaard. In the municipal reorganization of the province of Friesland (1984), the municipality Dongeradeel West merged with the municipality Oostdongeradeel and the city of Dokkum into the new Dongeradeel. In 2019 part of the new municipality Noardeast-Fryslân.

== Services ==
Ternaard offers a supermarket, butchers, a kindergarten, an elementary school, a health center, a homeopathic practice and a retirement home. There is also a bus service to Dokkum and Leeuwarden.

== Sports ==
Ternaard in sport has a billiard club, a football club, a tennis club a bounce, a bocce and volleyball.

== Churches ==
- The (late Gothic) Grote Kerk dates from the 16th century. This church has a fine 17th-century interior.
- Ternaard the Mennonite church has merged with the Mennonite church-Holwerd Blija in the new town-Holwerd Blija and Ternaard. In October 2007, the last service held in the Baptist church Ternaard. This church building has been sold.
- The Reformed Church in 1921 was designed by Ane Nauta.

== Climate ==
Ternaard features an oceanic climate (Köppen Cfb).

Climate data for Ternaard (2009-2015)
Month	Jan	Feb	Mar	Apr	May	Jun	Jul	Aug	Sep	Oct	Nov	Dec	Year
Record high °C (°F)	12.3 (54.1)	11.3 (52.3)	20.4 (68.7)	26.3 (79.3)	28.3 (82.9)	31.4 (88.5)	35.3 (95.5)	33.2 (91.8)	30.1 (86.2)	24.0 (75.2)	17.1 (62.8)	13.2 (55.8)	35.3 (95.5)
Mean daily maximum °C (°F)	4.4 (39.9)	4.5 (40.1)	8.4 (47.1)	12.3 (54.1)	15.7 (60.3)	18.0 (64.4)	21.4 (70.5)	21.0 (69.8)	17.8 (64.0)	13.9 (57.0)	8.9 (48.0)	6.0 (42.8)	12.7 (54.8)
Daily mean °C (°F)	2.6 (36.7)	2.2 (36.0)	5.2 (41.4)	8.6 (47.5)	12.0 (53.6)	14.6 (58.3)	17.7 (63.9)	17.1 (62.8)	14.5 (58.1)	10.9 (51.6)	6.9 (44.4)	4.1 (39.4)	9.7 (49.5)
Mean daily minimum °C (°F)	0.5 (32.9)	0.2 (32.4)	2.3 (36.1)	5.4 (41.7)	8.5 (47.3)	11.4 (52.5)	14.2 (57.6)	13.3 (55.9)	11.4 (52.5)	8.2 (46.8)	4.7 (40.5)	2.0 (35.6)	6.8 (44.3)
Record low °C (°F)	−14.3 (6.3)	−14.3 (6.3)	−6.1 (21.0)	−3.1 (26.4)	0.3 (32.5)	6.0 (42.8)	8.9 (48.0)	8.2 (46.8)	4.5 (40.1)	1.0 (33.8)	−4.7 (23.5)	−10.1 (13.8)	−14.3 (6.3)
Average precipitation mm (inches)	54.1 (2.13)	43.6 (1.72)	30.2 (1.19)	26.1 (1.03)	29.8 (1.17)	52.1 (2.05)	60.2 (2.37)	84.8 (3.34)	71.6 (2.82)	77.2 (3.04)	61.7 (2.43)	74.7 (2.94)	666.1 (26.23)
Source: http://www.weerstation-ternaard.nl/index.php?option=com_content&view=article&id=9&Itemid=31
