= Hatsum =

Hatsum Hatzum
- Hamlet
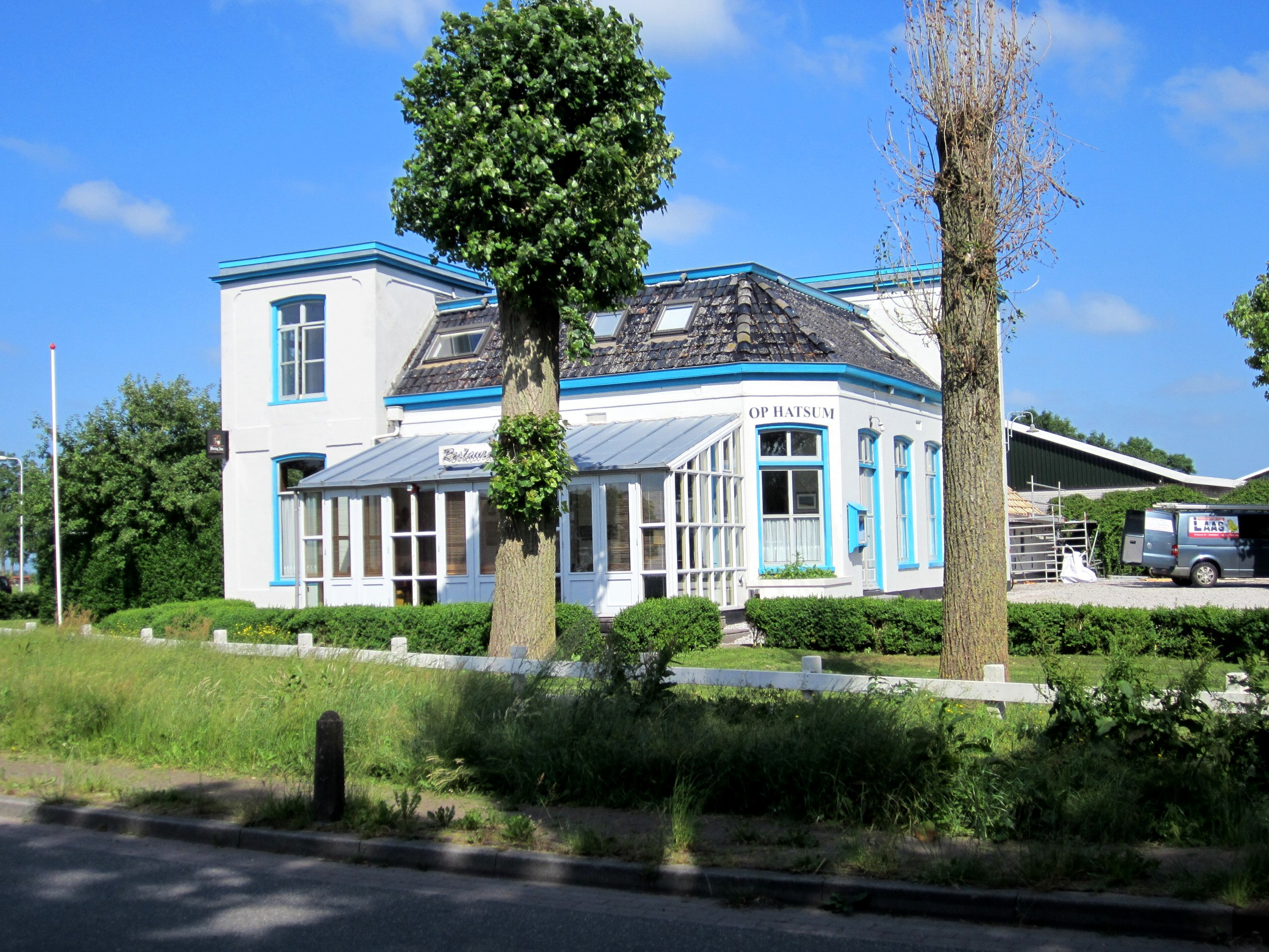
- Restaurant Op Hatsum in Hatsum

- Location in the province of Friesland in the Netherlands Hatsum (Netherlands)
- Coordinates: 53.17812°N 5.63400°E
- Country: Netherlands
- Province: Friesland
- Municipality: Waadhoeke
- Village: Dronryp
- Elevation: 1.0 m (3.3 ft)

Population
  - Total: c. 45
- Time zone: UTC+1 (CET)
  - Summer (DST): UTC+2 (CEST)
- Postcode: 9035
- Area code: 0517

Hatsum or Hatzum (Dutch pronunciation: [ˈɦɑt.sʏm]) is a hamlet in the Dutch municipality of Waadhoeke in the province of Friesland. It is located north of Baaium and south of Dronryp, of which it is a part administratively.

The mainly dispersed residences of the hamlet are located on the roads Longbuorren, Hatzum, Keimptilsterdyk and a part of Rewertdyk (up to the Molensloot). The residences on the Dykshoek on the Van Harinxma Canal are also included in the hamlet, even though it actually belongs to the Kingmatille hamlet. The Hatsumer Opfeart also flows through the hamlet.

Built on a terp, the hamlet was first mentioned in 1511 as Hastzen, in 1531 as Hatsem and in 1543 as Hatzum. On the southeastern side of Baaium was also a place of the same name, which was mentioned in 1511 as Hastzen as well. It was a large farm that was referred to as Lamkema in the 17th century, later found as a field name as Hatsem. Given the proximity, it may be directly connected. It is assumed that the place name refers to the fact that it is a place of residence (-heem/-um) of or founded by the person Hette.

A double train track also runs through the hamlet and it therefore has a train station, Dronryp railway station. There is also a restaurant, currently called Op Hatsum. On the Hatsumeropvaart near Kingmatille is a windmill of the same name, Kingmatille which has been on that spot since 1987, and near the railway is the Hatsumermolen.

== Gallery ==
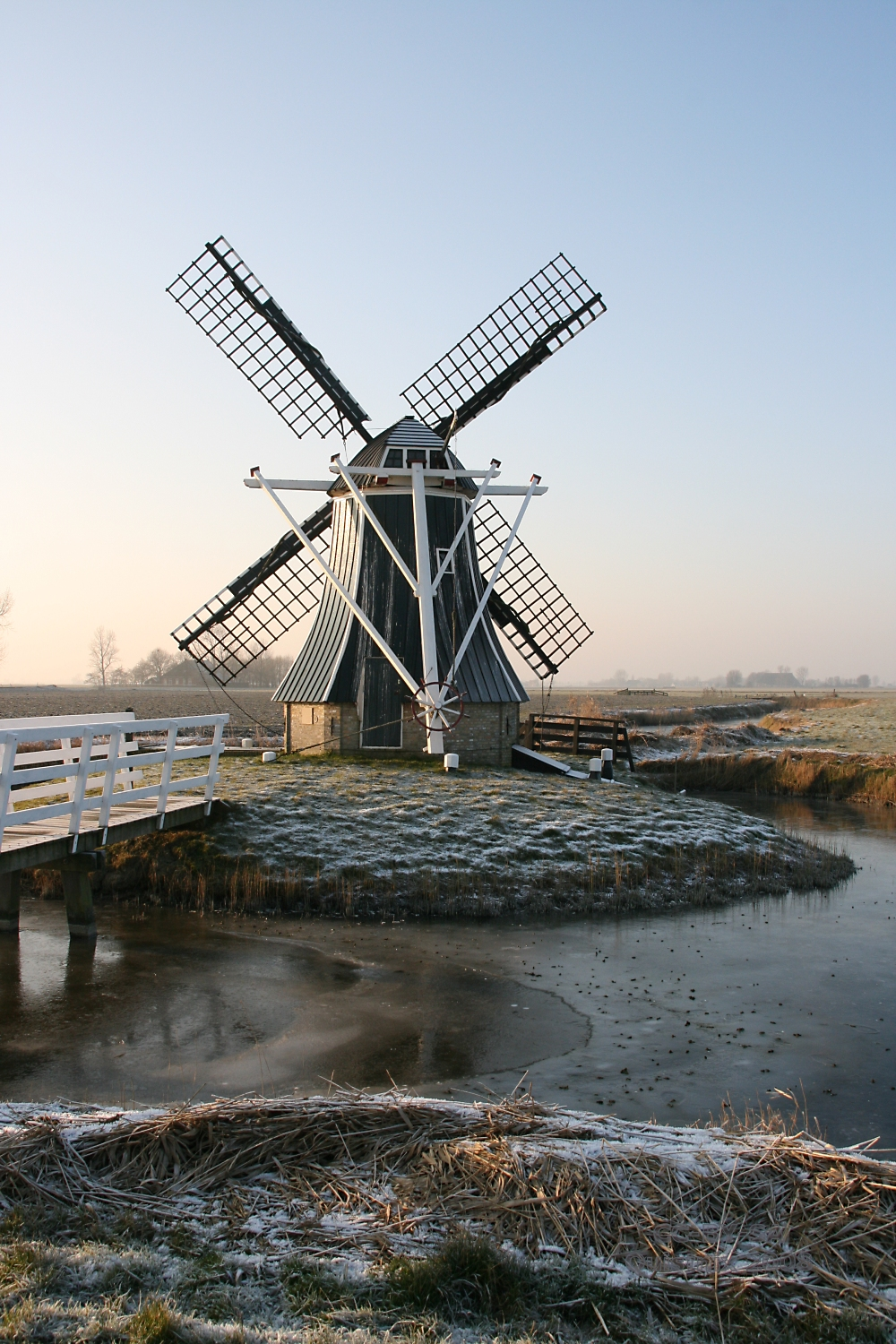
Hatsumermolen

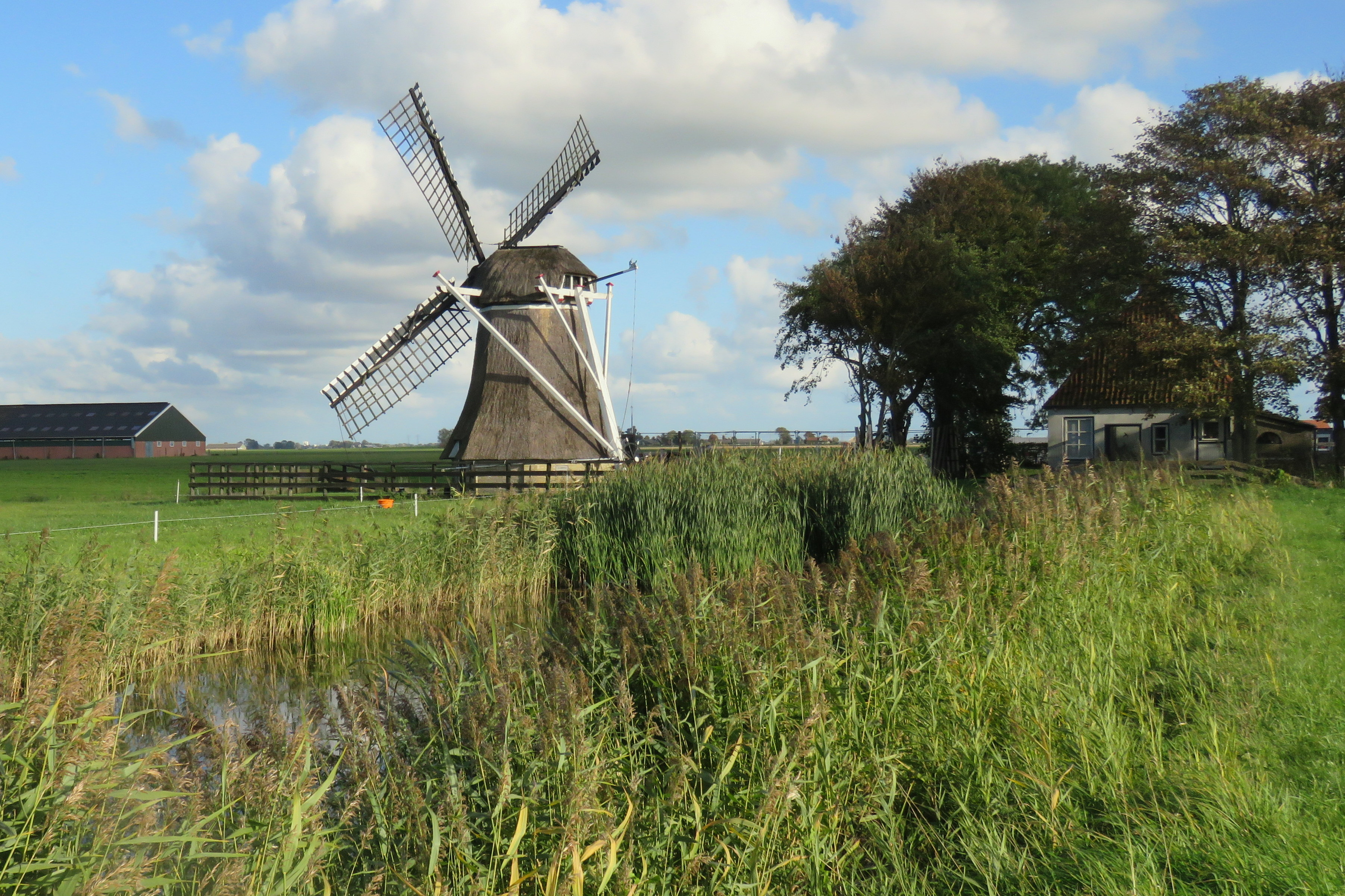
Kingmatille

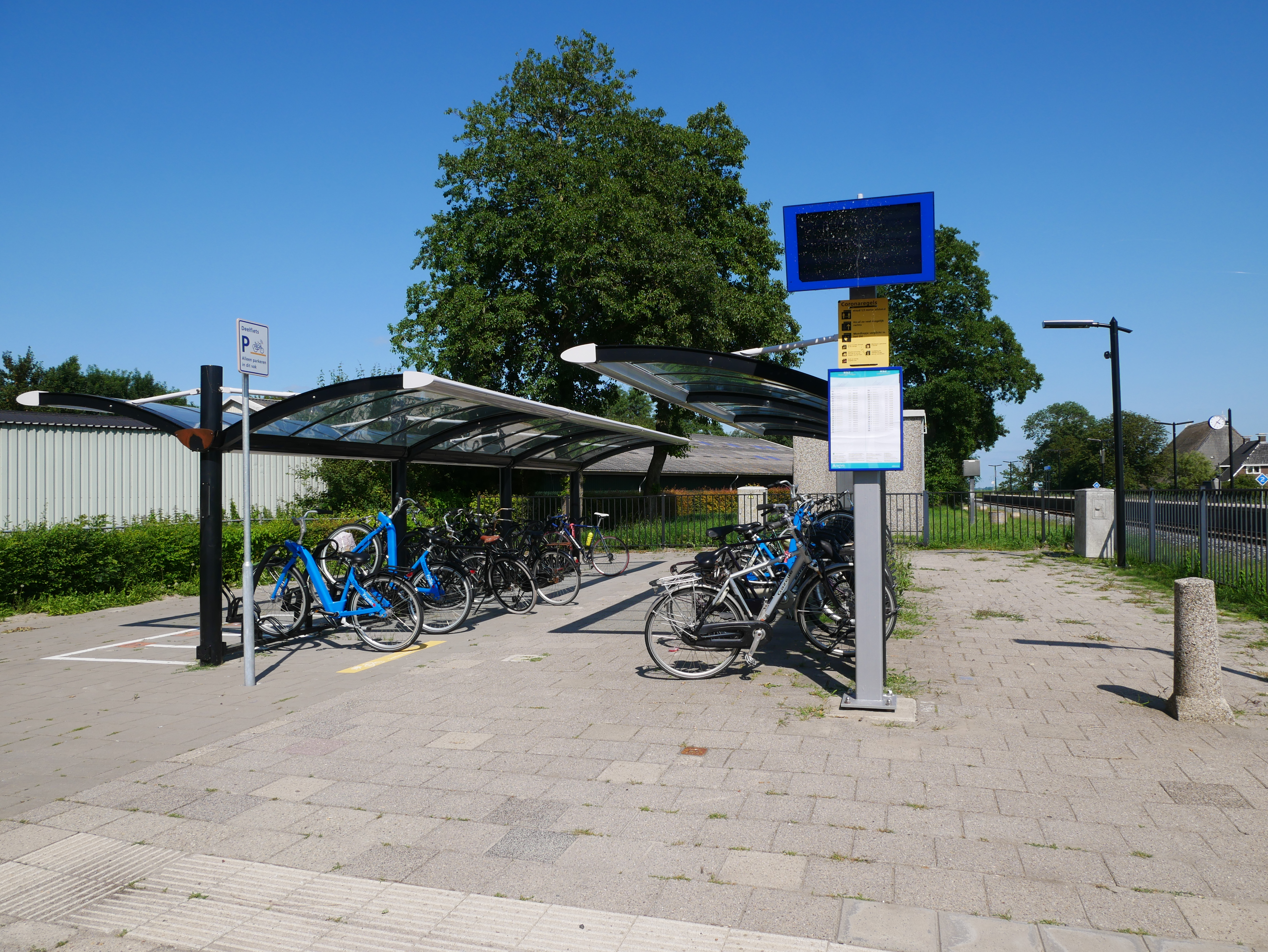
Dronryp railway station

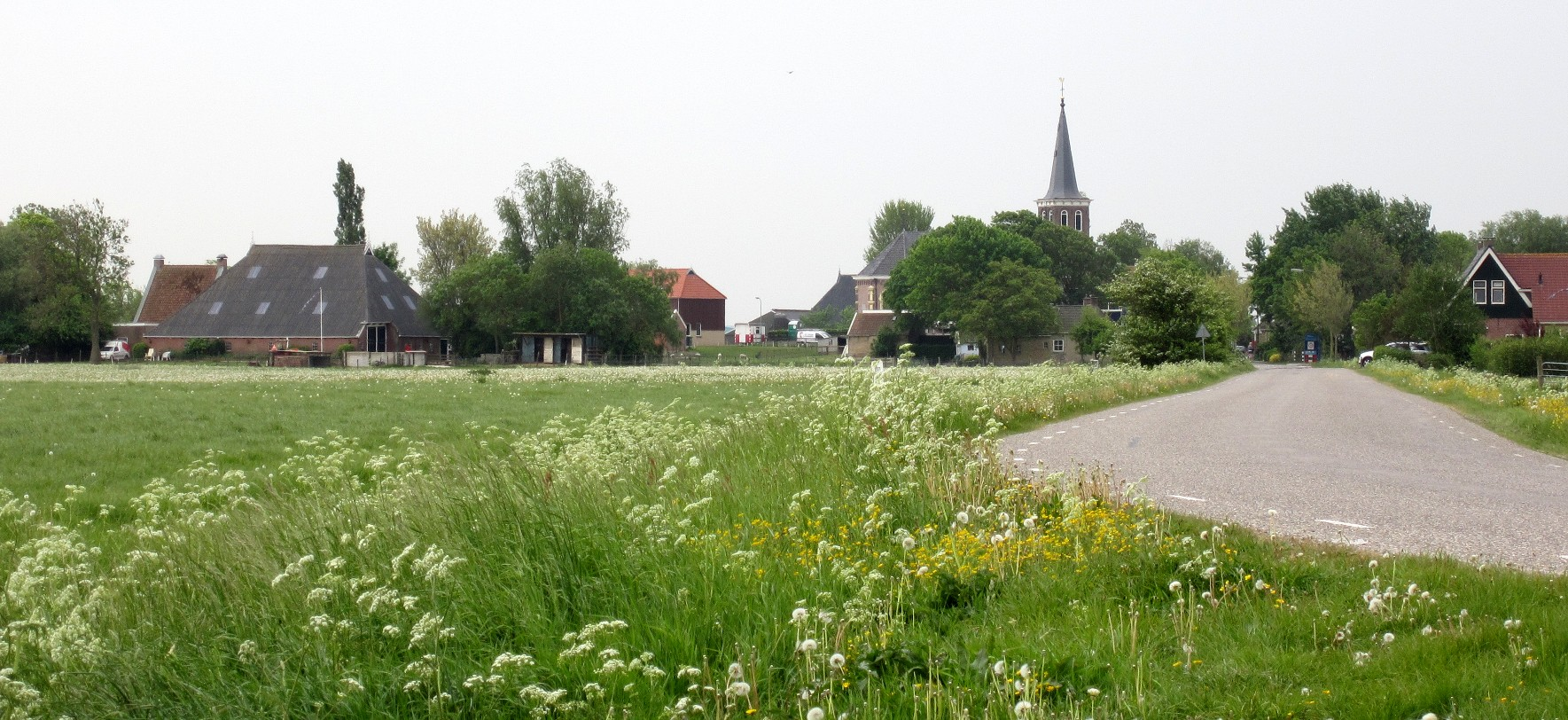
View from Hatsum on Baaium
