= Kingmatille =

Kingmatille Keimpetille (West Frisian)
- Hamlet
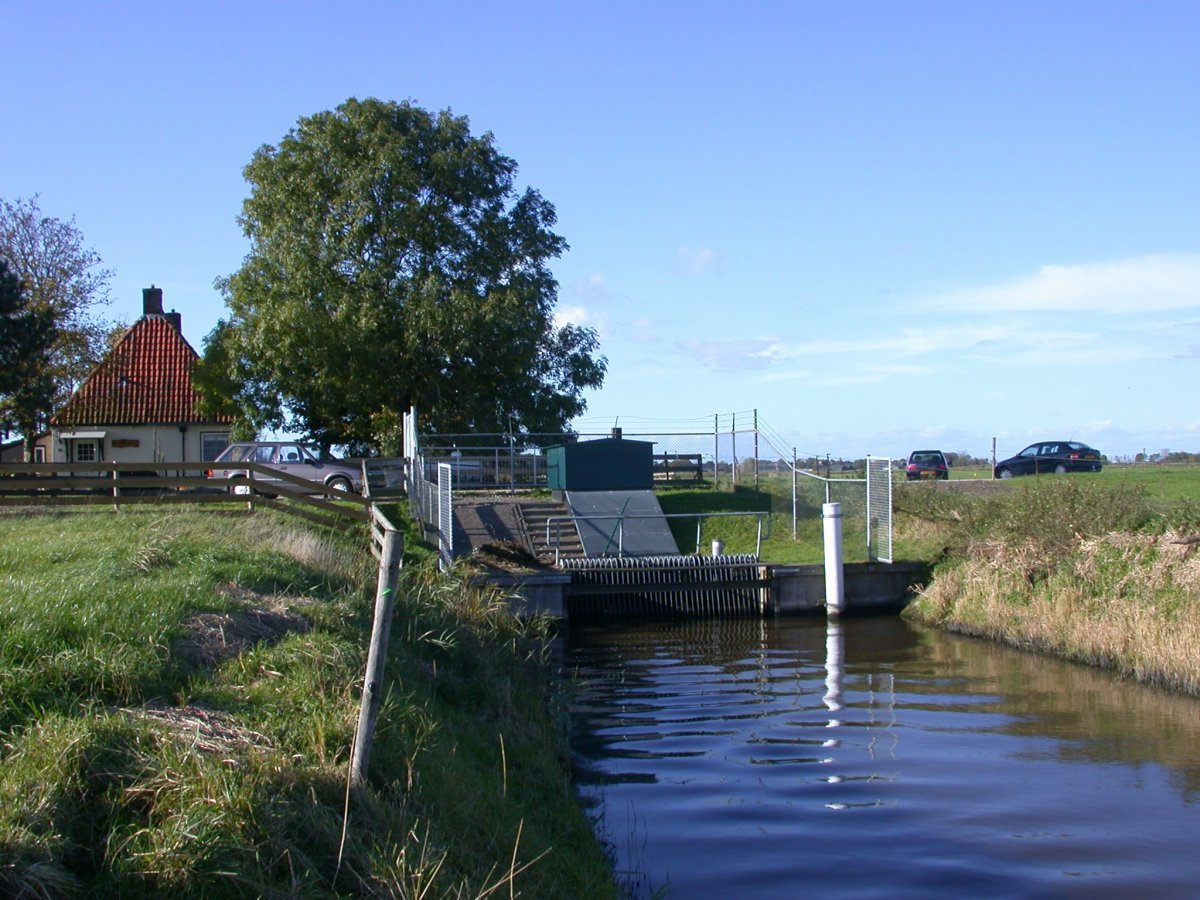
- View of a house in Kingmatille

- Location in the province of Friesland in the Netherlands Kingmatille (Netherlands)
- Coordinates: 53.18401°N 5.60366°E
- Country: Netherlands
- Province: Friesland
- Municipality: Waadhoeke
- Villages: Dronryp; Wjelsryp; Zweins
- Elevation: 0.4 m (1.3 ft)

Population
  - Total: c. 50
- Time zone: UTC+1 (CET)
  - Summer (DST): UTC+2 (CEST)
- Postcode: 8814; 8842; 9035
- Area code: 0517

Kingmatille (Dutch: [ˈkɪŋmaːˌtɪlə]; West Frisian: Keimpetille) is a hamlet in the Dutch municipality of Waadhoeke in the province of Friesland. It is located east of the city of Franeker, and southwest of the villages of Zweins and Dronryp. Most of the residents of the hamlet are located on the road of the same name north of the Van Harinxma Canal.

The hamlet originated at a bridge (West Frisian: tille) over the Harlinger Trekvaart on the territory of the since-disappeared stins of the Kingma family. In 1718 it was referred to as Kingma Tille. Due to the widening of this canal to the current Van Harinxma Canal, this bridge was replaced by a ferry in 1947. This ferry was taken out of service in 1963 due to excessive costs. In the summer of 2011, the Keimpetille bicycle and pedestrian ferry (with the name Jacob Petrus, running on solar energy) was put into use.

The settlement of the hamlet is located on both sides of the Van Harinxma Canal. On the southern side of the water, the number of houses has reduced to just two, which are located on the Dykshoek. There were more until the mid-20th century. The settlement on the Dykshoek is no longer always included in Kingmatille, but in Hatsum, which is a part of Dronryp, and Tjeppenboer, which is part of Wjelsryp. The rest of the residences are administratively a part of Zweins.

To the north of the hamlet is the eponymous windmill, Kingmatille.

== Gallery ==
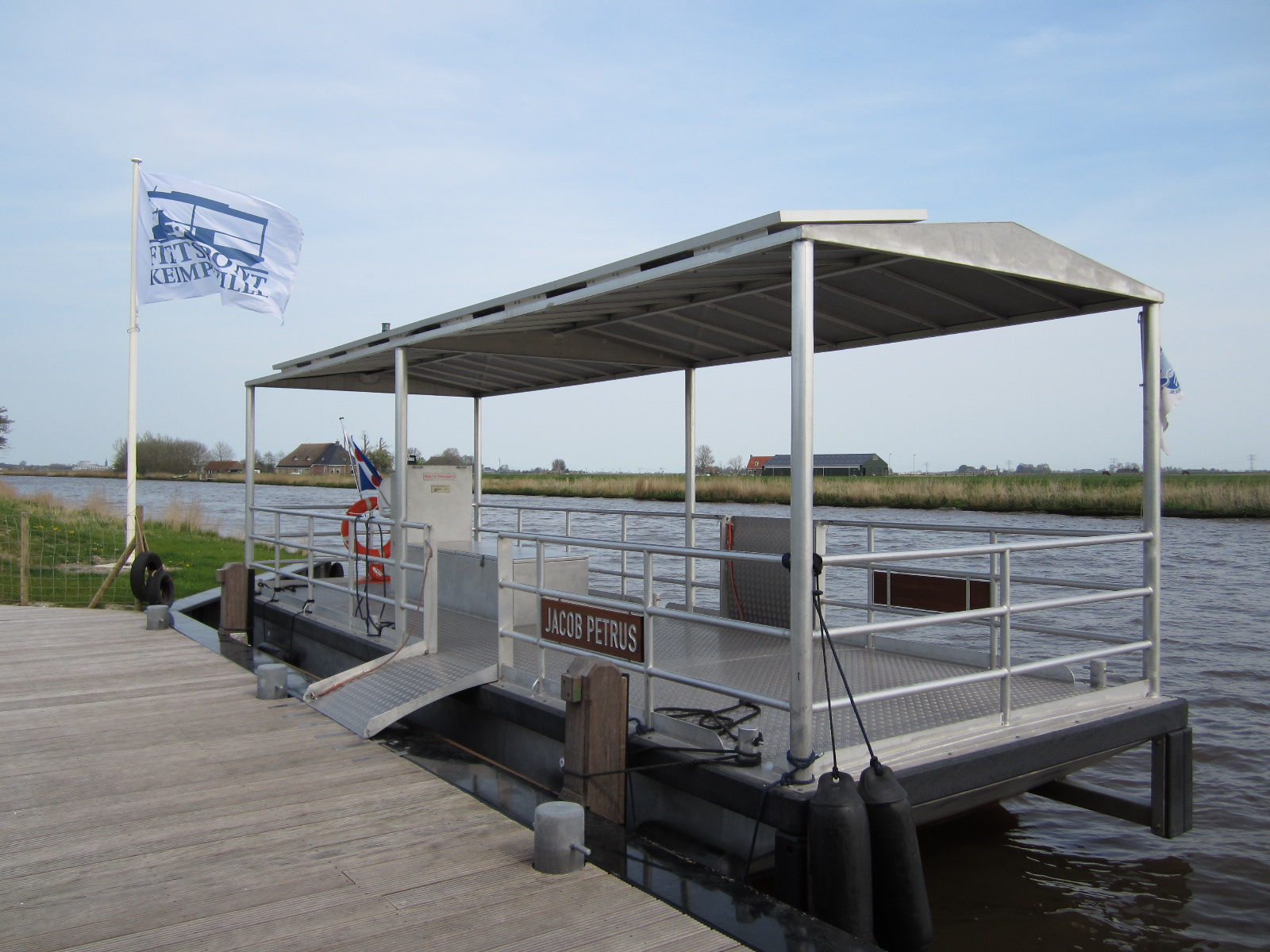
Keimpetille ferry

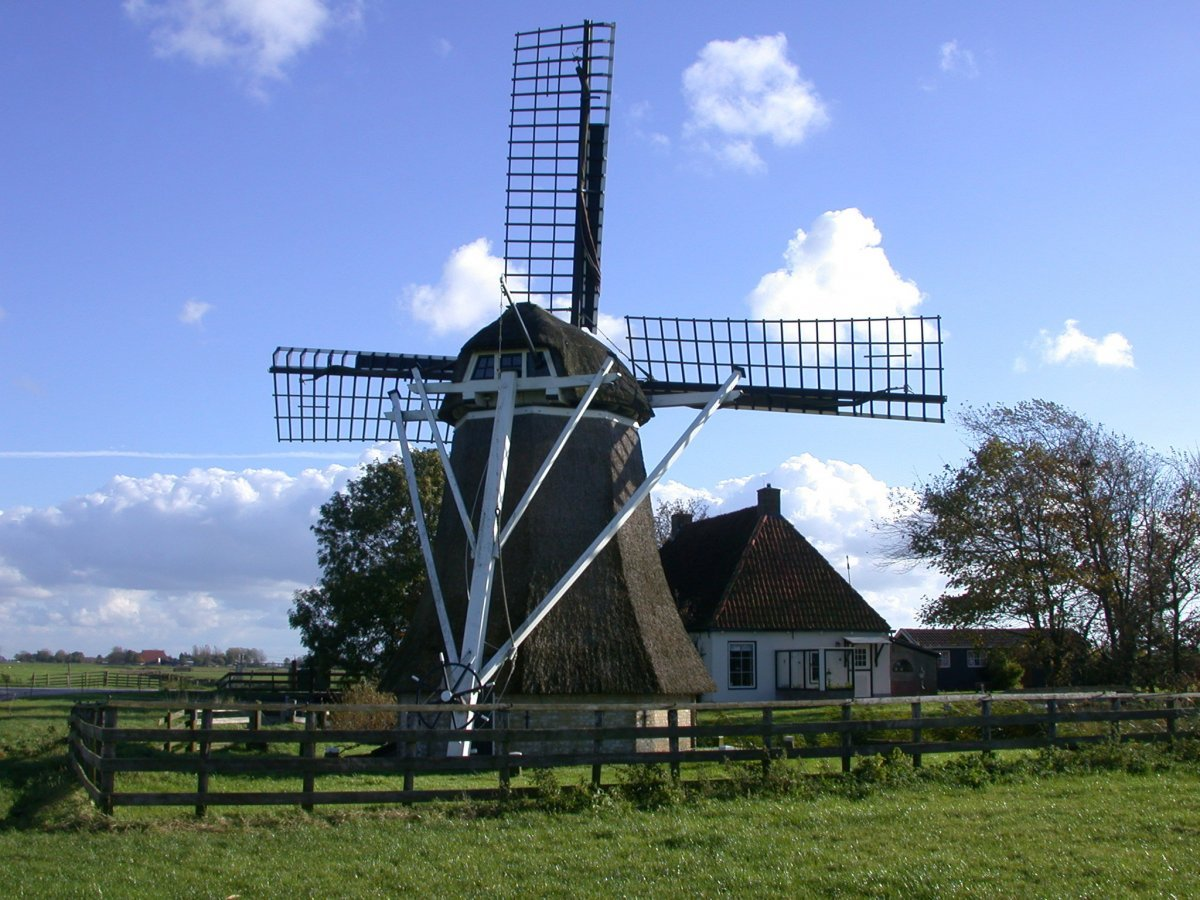
Kingmatille windmill

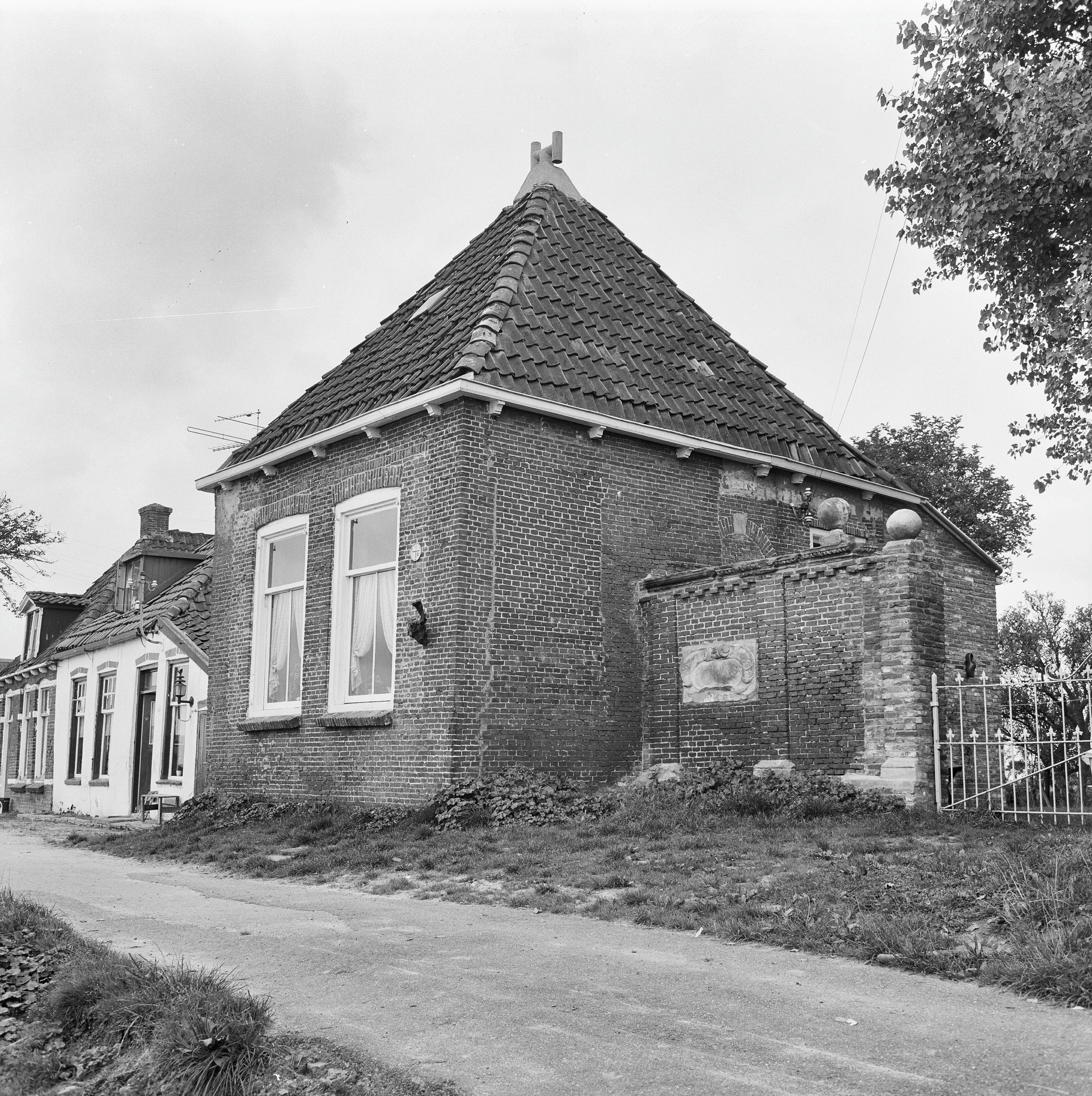
Monumental building in Kingmatille, 1969
