= De Puollen =

De Puollen De Poelen (Dutch)
- Hamlet
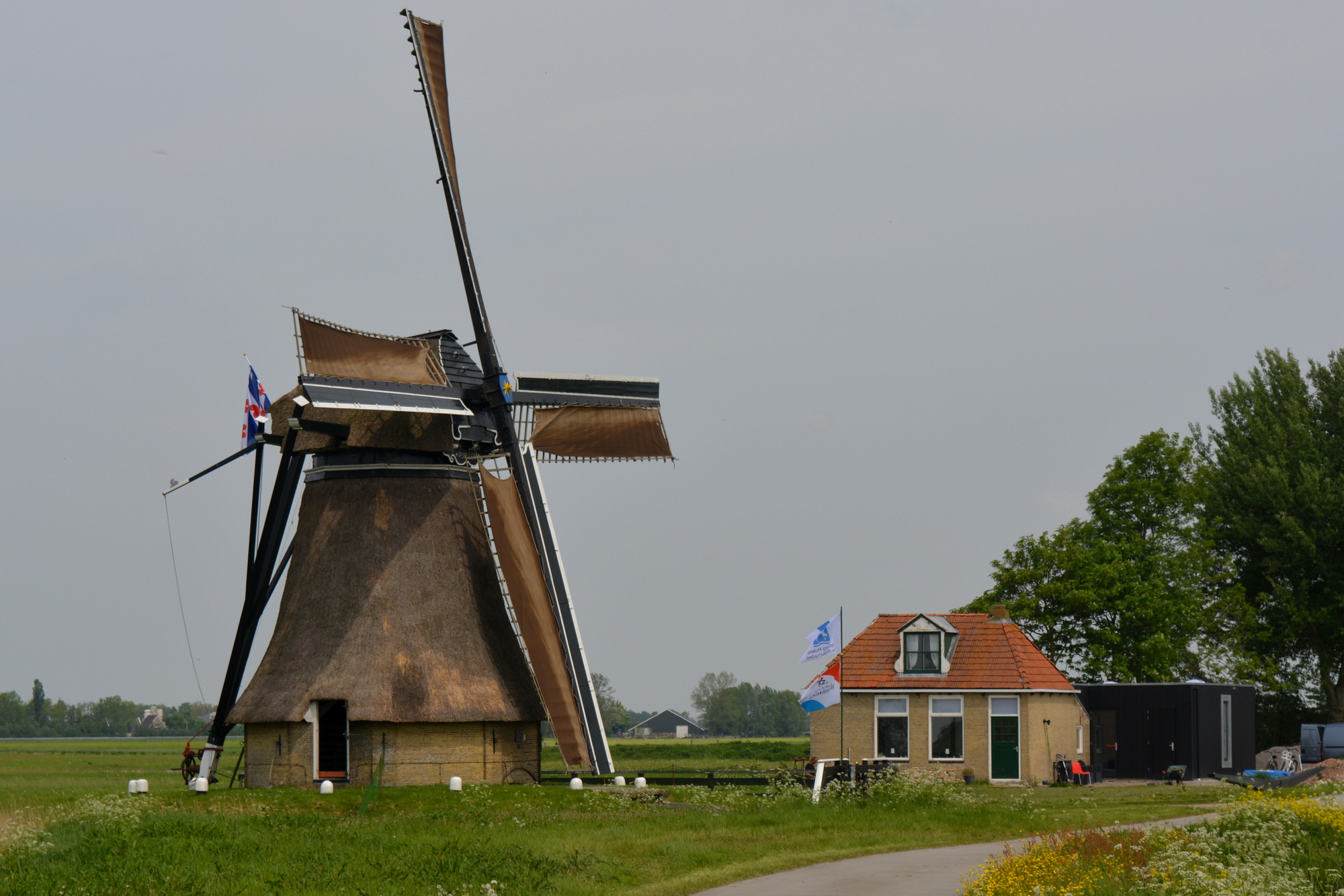
- Eponymous windmill De Poelen near the hamlet

- Location in the province of Friesland in the Netherlands De Puollen (Netherlands)
- Coordinates: 53.18975°N 5.67085°E
- Country: Netherlands
- Province: Friesland
- Municipality: Waadhoeke
- Village: Dronryp
- Elevation: 0.5 m (1.6 ft)
- Time zone: UTC+1 (CET)
  - Summer (DST): UTC+2 (CEST)
- Postcode: 9035
- Area code: 0517

De Puollen (Dutch: De Poelen [də ˈpulə(n)]) is a hamlet in the Dutch municipality of Waadhoeke in the province of Friesland. It is located to the south of Deinum and on the east side of Dronryp, of which it is a part administratively. The Puolfeart (Dutch: Poelvaart) flows through the hamlet and its surrounding polder. This canal forms the heart of the hamlet, which consists of scattered residences on the Puoldyk.

The polder was called Oosterpolder for a while, but later received the name of the hamlet. The polder was drained by the De Poelen polder mill. The area of De Puollen was described in Latin in 1450 as terra situata in da Polum. In 1483 people speak of someone who lived in Poland. In the sixteenth century there was a real hamlet and it was mentioned as Puelen and Poelen. A century later people speak of De Poelen. The place name could also refer to the fact that it was a watery area (a 'pool').

Currently located in the municipality of Waadhoeke, De Puollen belonged to Menameradiel until the municipal reorganization of 2018. Having been part of Menameradiel, the hamlet's official name is in West Frisian since 2010, as opposed to the Dutch variant.
