= Deinum railway station =

Railway station in the Netherlands

Deinum

General information
- Location: Spoorstraat, 9033WJ Deinum, Friesland; Netherlands
- Coordinates: 53°11′19″N 5°43′40″E
- Line: Harlingen–Nieuweschans railway

History
- Opened: 27 October 1863

Services
Preceding station	Arriva Netherlands	Following station
Dronryp towards Harlingen Haven	Stoptrein 37200	Leeuwarden Terminus
Location
- Location within Netherlands

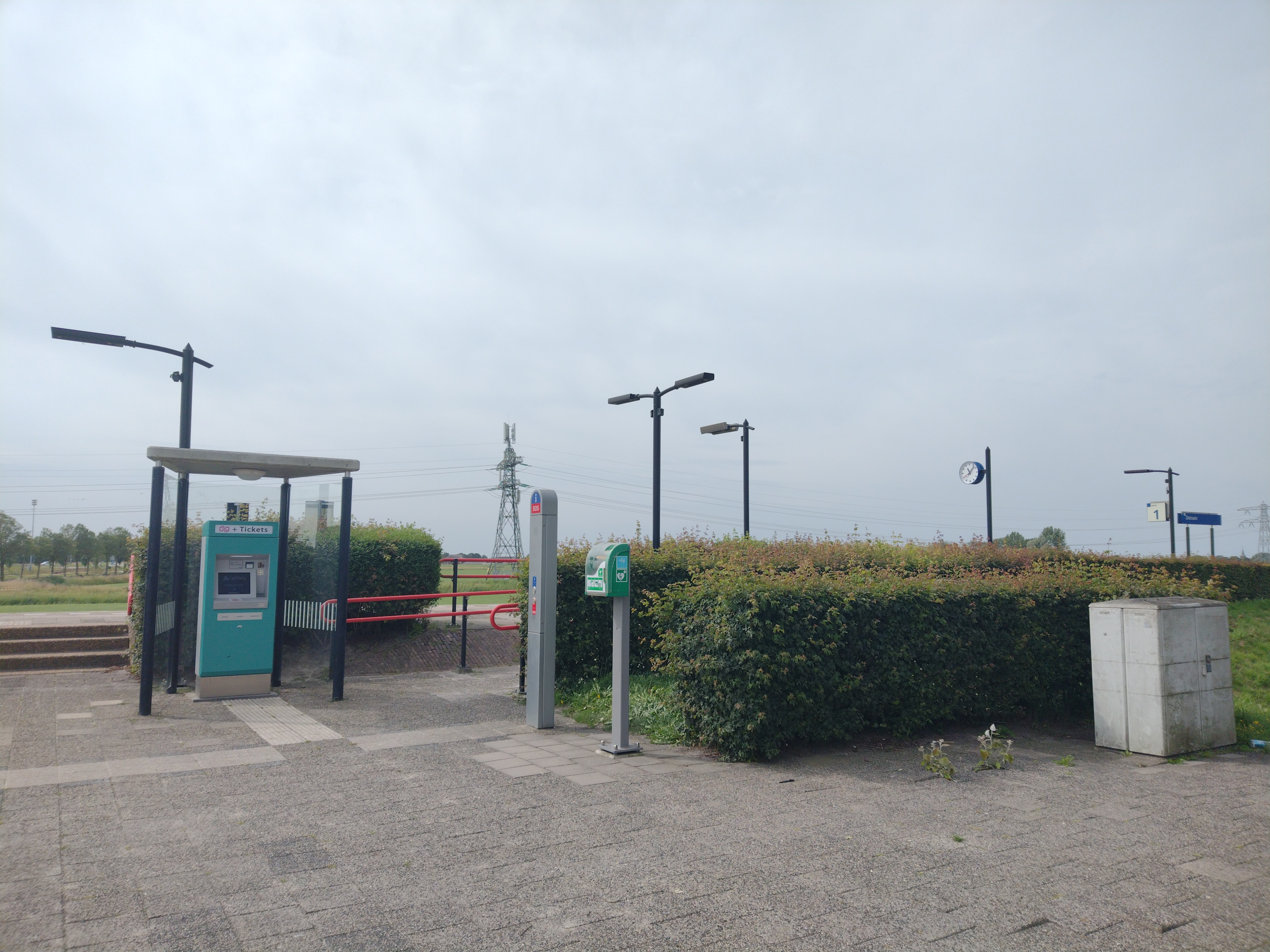
Deinum Train Station

Deinum is a railway station located in Deinum, Netherlands. The station was opened on 27 October 1863 and is located on the Harlingen–Nieuweschans railway between Harlingen and Leeuwarden. Train services are operated by Arriva.

== OV Chipkaart ==
Most public transit in the Netherlands makes use of the OV chipkaart, a national public transit card. The OV chipkaart is usable at this railway station.

== Train services ==
Route	Service type	Operator	Notes
Leeuwarden - Deinum - Dronryp - Franeker - Harlingen - Harlingen Haven	Local ("Stoptrein")	Arriva	2x per hour - 1x per hour after 21:00

== Bus services ==
Line	Route	Operator	Notes
788	Deinum - Ritsumasyl	Qbuzz	This bus requires a reservation at least 1 hour before departure.
800	Deinum - Blessum	Qbuzz	This bus requires a reservation at least 1 hour before departure.
801	Deinum - Hilaard	Qbuzz	This bus requires a reservation at least 1 hour before departure.
813	Deinum - Jellum	Qbuzz	No service during peak hours. This bus requires a reservation at least 1 hour before departure.
814	Deinum - Bears	Qbuzz	This bus requires a reservation at least 1 hour before departure.

== See also ==
- List of railway stations in Friesland
