= Franeker railway station =

Railway station in Franeker, Netherlands

Franeker
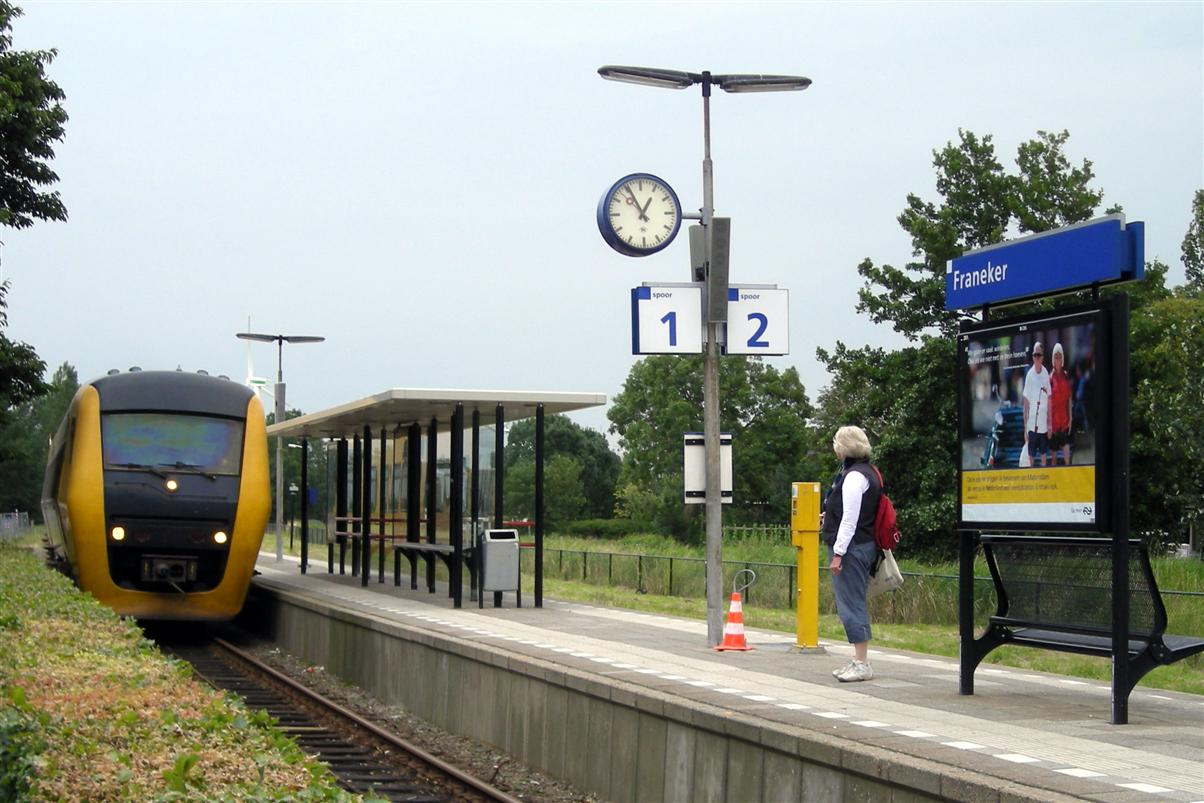

General information
- Location: Netherlands
- Coordinates: 53°10′56″N 5°32′58″E
- Line: Harlingen–Nieuweschans railway

History
- Opened: 27 October 1863

Services
Preceding station	Arriva Netherlands	Following station
Harlingen towards Harlingen Haven	Stoptrein 37200	Dronryp towards Leeuwarden
Location
- Location within Netherlands

Franeker is a railway station located in Franeker, Netherlands. The station was opened on 27 October 1863 and is located on the Harlingen–Nieuweschans railway between Harlingen and Leeuwarden. The train services are operated by Arriva.

== Train service ==
Route	Service type	Operator	Notes
Leeuwarden - Deinum - Dronryp - Franeker - Harlingen - Harlingen Haven	Local ("Stoptrein")	Arriva	2x per hour - 1x per hour after 21:00

== Bus services ==
Line	Route	Operator	Notes
35	Sneek - Scharnegoutum - Boazum - Easterlittens - Winsum - Wjelsryp - Tzum - Franeker	Qbuzz	Mon-Fri peak hours only
75	Bolsward - Witmarsum - Arum - Achlum - Franeker - Tzummarum - Minnertsga	Qbuzz	Mon-Fri peak hours only
794	Franeker - Firdgum	Qbuzz	This bus only runs if reserved at least 1 hour before departure.
796	Franeker - Peins	Qbuzz	This bus only runs if reserved at least 1 hour before departure.
797	Franeker - Ried	Qbuzz	This bus only runs if reserved at least 1 hour before departure.
798	Franeker - Schingen	Qbuzz	This bus only runs if reserved at least 1 hour before departure.
799	Franeker - Slappeterp	Qbuzz	This bus only runs if reserved at least 1 hour before departure.
803	Franeker - Schalsum	Qbuzz	This bus only runs if reserved at least 1 hour before departure.
804	Franeker - Boer	Qbuzz	This bus only runs if reserved at least 1 hour before departure.
805	Franeker - Dongjum	Qbuzz	No peak hour service. This bus only runs if reserved at least 1 hour before departure.
806	Franeker - Herbaijum	Qbuzz	No peak hour service. This bus only runs if reserved at least 1 hour before departure.
807	Franeker - Hitzum	Qbuzz	No peak hour service. This bus only runs if reserved at least 1 hour before departure.
808	Franeker - Tzum	Qbuzz	No peak hour service. This bus only runs if reserved at least 1 hour before departure.
809	Franeker - Wjelsryp	Qbuzz	No peak hour service. This bus only runs if reserved at least 1 hour before departure.
810	Franeker - Achlum	Qbuzz	No peak hour services. This bus only runs if reserved at least 1 hour before departure.

Services are run by Qbuzz.

== Gallery ==
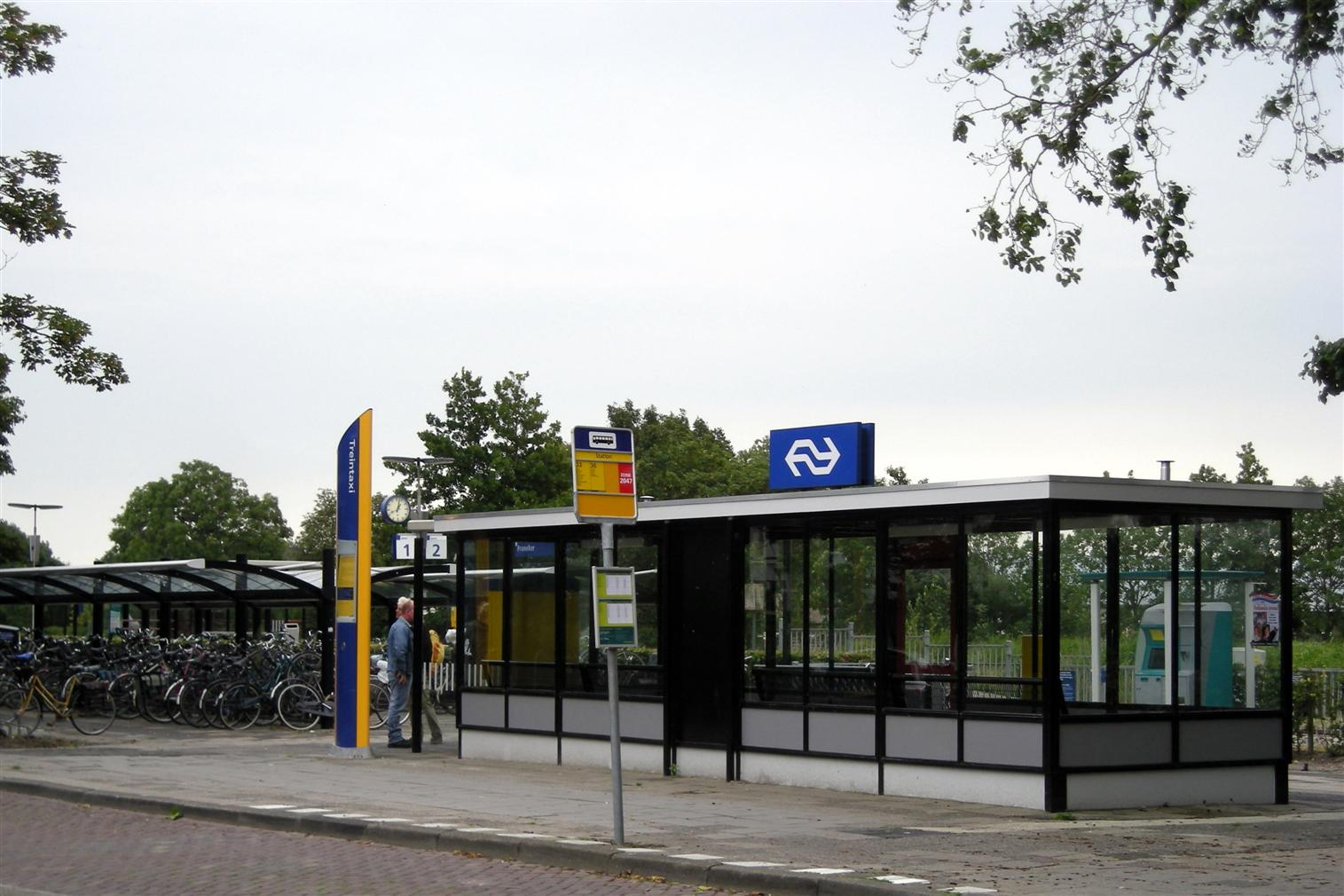
Franeker Station bus stop

== See also ==
- List of railway stations in Friesland
