= Harlingen Haven railway station =

Railway station in Harlingen, Netherlands

Harlingen Haven
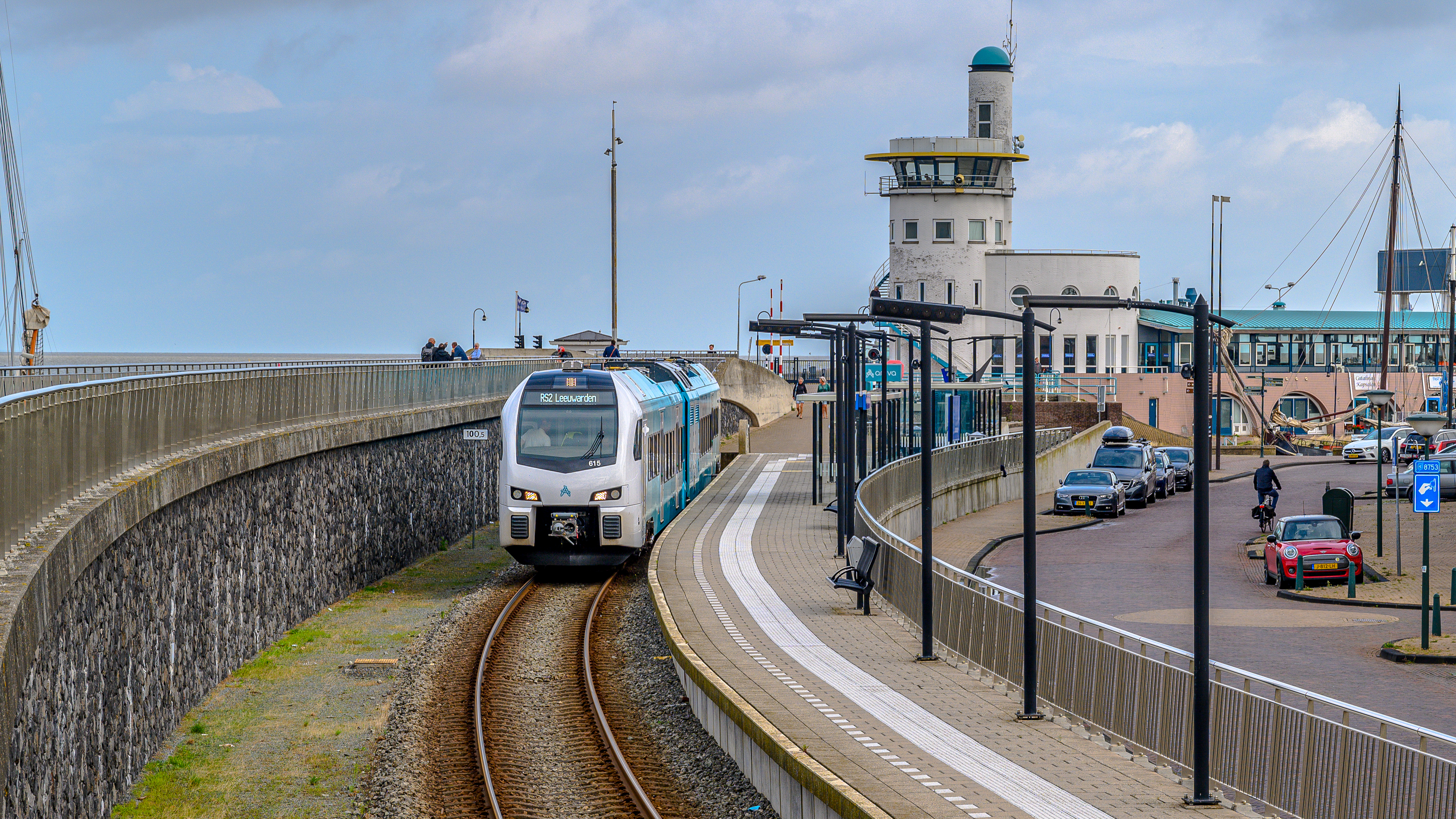
- Harlingen Haven railway station in 2021

General information
- Location: Netherlands
- Coordinates: 53°10′28″N 05°24′40″E
- Line: Harlingen–Nieuweschans railway

Other information
- Station code: Hlgh

History
- Opened: 27 October 1863

Services
Preceding station	Arriva Netherlands	Following station
Terminus	Stoptrein 37200	Harlingen towards Leeuwarden
Location
- Location within Netherlands

Harlingen Haven (Dutch pronunciation: [ˈɦɑrlɪŋə(n) ˈɦaːvə(n)]; abbreviation: Hlgh) is an unstaffed railway station in Harlingen, Netherlands. The station was opened on 27 October 1863 and is the western terminus station of the Harlingen–Nieuweschans railway. The services are operated by Arriva. Ferry services to Vlieland and Terschelling depart from near the station. 600m east of this station is Harlingen station.

== Train services ==
Route	Service type	Operator	Notes
Leeuwarden - Deinum - Dronryp - Franeker - Harlingen - Harlingen Haven	Local ("Stoptrein")	Arriva	2x per hour - 1x per hour after 21:00

== Bus services ==
Line	Route	Operator	Notes
71	Kop Afsluitdijk - Zurich - Harlingen - Midlum - Wijnaldum - Pietersbierum - Sexbierum - Oosterbierum - Tzummarum - Minnertsga - Berlitsum - Bitgummole - Marssum - Leeuwarden	Qbuzz	Daily service
99	Heerenveen - Joure - Uitwellingerga - Sneek - Bolsward - Witmarsum - Arum - Kimswerd - Harlingen	Qbuzz	Daily service
197	Leeuwarden - Dronryp - Zweins - Franeker - Herbaijum - Midlum - Harlingen	Qbuzz	This bus operates Monday-Friday during peak hours only.

== See also ==
- List of railway stations in Friesland
