= Harlingen railway station =

Railway station in Harlingen, Netherlands

Harlingen
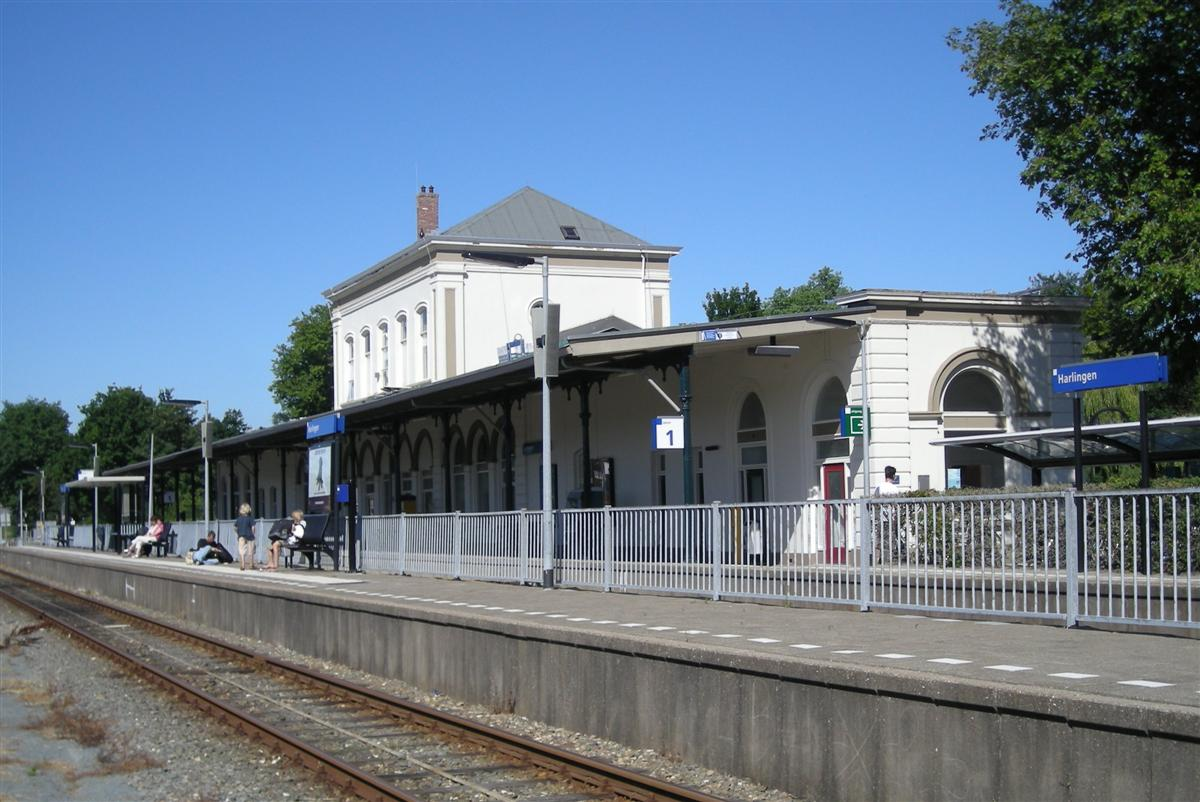

General information
- Location: Netherlands
- Coordinates: 53°10′13″N 5°25′31″E
- Line: Harlingen–Nieuweschans railway

History
- Opened: 27 October 1863

Services
Preceding station	Arriva Netherlands	Following station
Harlingen Haven Terminus	Stoptrein 37200	Franeker towards Leeuwarden
Location
- Location within Netherlands

Harlingen is a railway station located in Harlingen, Netherlands. The station was opened on 27 October 1863 and is located on the Harlingen–Nieuweschans railway. Train services are operated by Arriva. 600m west of this station is Harlingen Haven, the terminus of the line. From 1904 to 1935, Harlingen was the terminus of the Stiens-Harlingen railway line. From Harlingen Haven there are ferry connections to Terschelling and Vlieland.

== Train services ==
Route	Service type	Operator	Notes
Leeuwarden - Deinum - Dronryp - Franeker - Harlingen - Harlingen Haven	Local ("Stoptrein")	Arriva	2x per hour - 1x per hour after 21:00

== Bus services ==
Line	Route	Operator	Notes
71	Kop Afsluitdijk - Zurich - Harlingen - Midlum - Wijnaldum - Pietersbierum - Sexbierum - Oosterbierum - Tzummarum - Minnertsga - Berlitsum - Bitgummole - Marssum - Leeuwarden	Qbuzz	Daily service
99	Heerenveen - Joure - Uitwellingerga - Sneek - Bolsward - Witmarsum - Arum - Kimswerd - Harlingen	Qbuzz	Daily service
197	Leeuwarden - Dronryp - Zweins - Franeker - Herbaijum - Midlum - Harlingen	Qbuzz	Mon-Fri during peak hours only.
350	Alkmaar - Den Oever - Kop Afsluitdijk (- Harlingen) - Leeuwarden	Qbuzz	Only the last run on Sunday evenings, towards Leeuwarden, stops at Harlingen Station.
810	Achlum - Franeker/Harlingen	Qbuzz	This bus only operates if called 1,5 hours before its supposed departure ("belbus"). This bus does not operate during rush hours.
811	Pingjum - Harlingen/Bolsward	Qbuzz	This bus only operates if called 1,5 hours before its supposed departure ("belbus"). This bus does not operate during rush hours.
812	Wijnaldum - Harlingen	Qbuzz	This bus only operates if called 1,5 hours before its supposed departure ("belbus").
828	Midlum - Harlingen	Qbuzz	This bus only operates if called 1,5 hours before its supposed departure ("belbus"). This bus does not operate during rush hours.

== Gallery ==
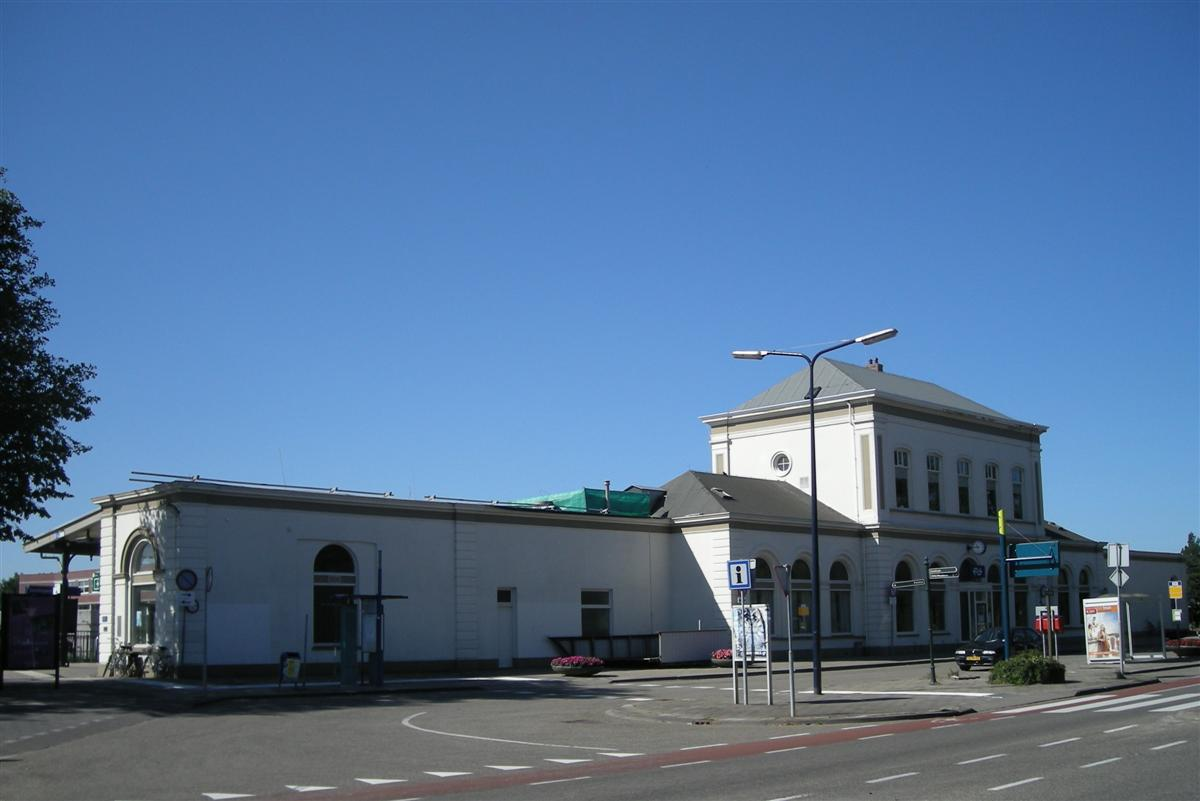
Harlingen Station building

== See also ==
- List of railway stations in Friesland
