= De Poelen, Dronryp =

Smock mill in the Netherlands

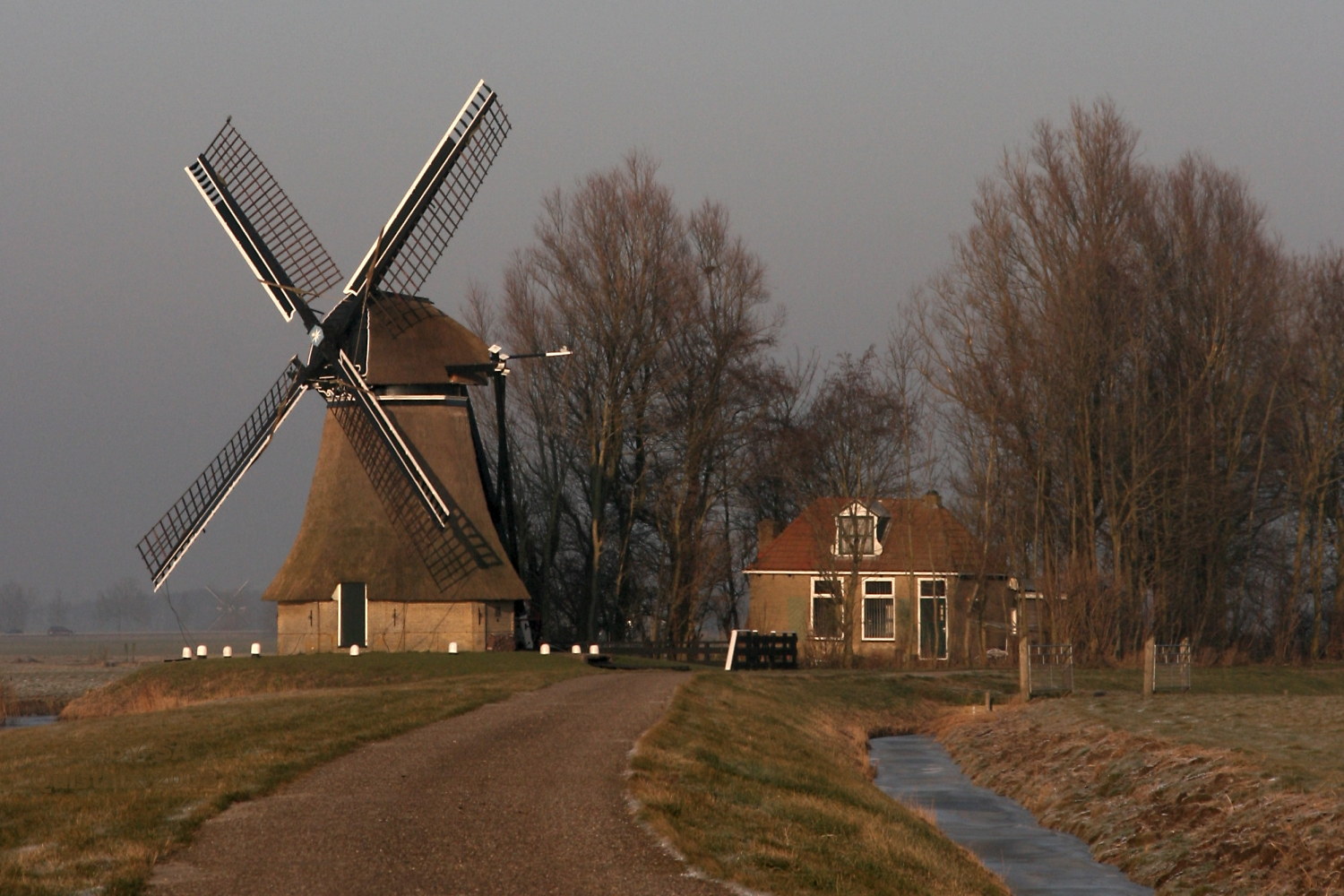
- De Poelen, December 2008

Origin
- Mill name: De Poelen; De Puollen
- Mill location: Puoldyk 69a, 9035 VC Dronryp
- Coordinates: 53°11′34″N 5°40′13″E
- Operator(s): Stichting Molens in Menameradiel
- Year built: 1850

Information
- Purpose: Drainage mill
- Type: Smock mill
- Storeys: Three-storey smock
- Base storeys: One-storey base
- Smock sides: Eight sides
- No. of sails: Four sails
- Type of sails: Common sails
- Windshaft: Cast iron
- Winding: Tailpole and winch
- Type of pump: Archimedes' screw

De Poelen or De Puollen is a smock mill in Dronryp, Friesland, Netherlands, which was built in 1850. The mill is listed as a Rijksmonument, number 28612. It is located in the hamlet of the same name, De Puollen.

== History ==
De Poelen was built in 1850 to drain the 365 hectares (900 acres) Oosterpolder. During its working life, the mill was fitted with Patent sails which had Dekkerised leading edges. The mill was restored in 1984–85, after years out of use and in decline. De Poelen was officially reopened on 27 April 1985. The mill now only pumps water in a circuit for demonstration purposes.

== Description ==
De Poelen is a three-storey smock mill on a single-storey base. There is no stage, the sail reaching almost to the ground. The smock and cap thatched. The mill is winded by tailpole and winch. The sails are Common sails. They have a span of 19.10 metres (62 ft 8 in). The sails are carried on a cast-iron windshaft, which is bored through to take the striking rod for Patent sails. The windshaft also carries the brake wheel which has 58 cogs. This drives the wallower (35 cogs) at the top of the upright shaft. At the bottom of the upright shaft, the crown wheel, which has 53 cogs drives a gearwheel with 38 cogs on the axle of the Archimedes' screw. The axle of the screw is 350 millimetres (1 ft 2 in) diameter and the screw is 1.50 metres (4 ft 11 in) diameter and 4.50 metres (14 ft 9 in) long. The screw is inclined at 20°. Each revolution of the screw lifts 919 litres (202 imp gal) of water.

== Public access ==
De Poelen is open to the public by appointment.
