= Dronryp railway station =

Railway station in the Netherlands

Dronryp
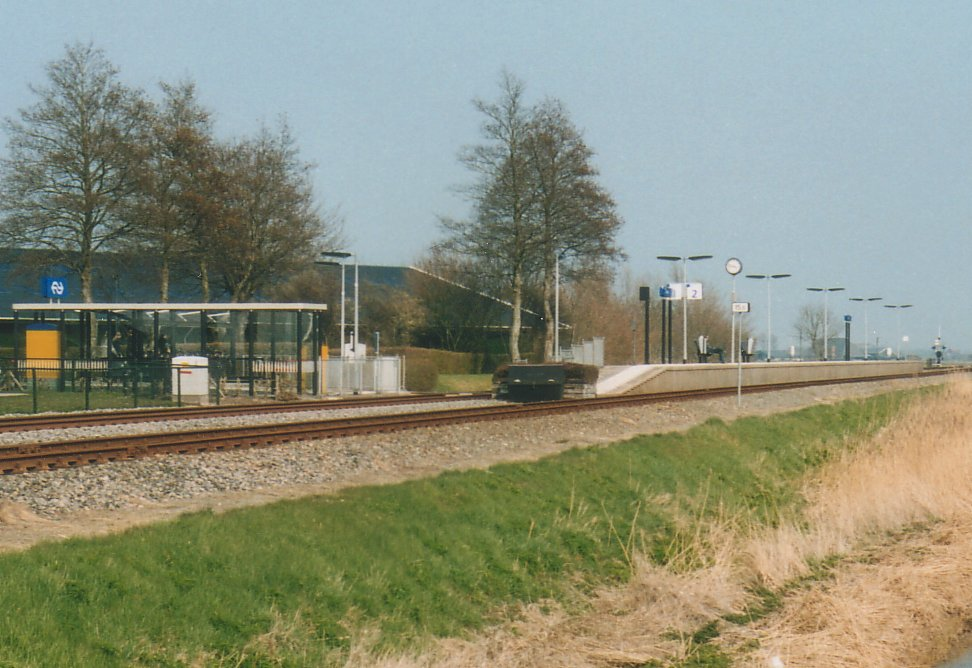

General information
- Location: Netherlands
- Coordinates: 53°10′39″N 5°38′05″E
- Line: Harlingen–Nieuweschans railway

History
- Opened: 27 October 1863

Services
Preceding station	Arriva Netherlands	Following station
Franeker towards Harlingen Haven	Stoptrein 37200	Deinum towards Leeuwarden
Location
- Location within Netherlands

Dronryp is the railway station of Dronryp, Netherlands, located in the hamlet of Hatsum. The station was opened on 27 October 1863 and is located on the Harlingen–Nieuweschans railway between Harlingen and Leeuwarden. The train services are operated by Arriva.

The station was spelled Dronrijp until 12 December 2015 when the spelling was changed to Dronryp. This is to reflect the Frisian name of the town.

== Train services ==
Route	Service type	Operator	Notes
Leeuwarden - Deinum - Dronryp - Franeker - Harlingen - Harlingen Haven	Local ("Stoptrein")	Arriva	2x per hour - 1x per hour after 21:00

== Bus services ==
Line	Route	Operator	Notes
802	Dronryp - Baaium	Qbuzz	This bus only runs if reserved at least 1 hour before departure.

== See also ==
- List of railway stations in Friesland
