= Leeuwarden Achter de Hoven railway station =

Railway station in Leeuwarden, Netherlands

Leeuwarden Achter de Hoven
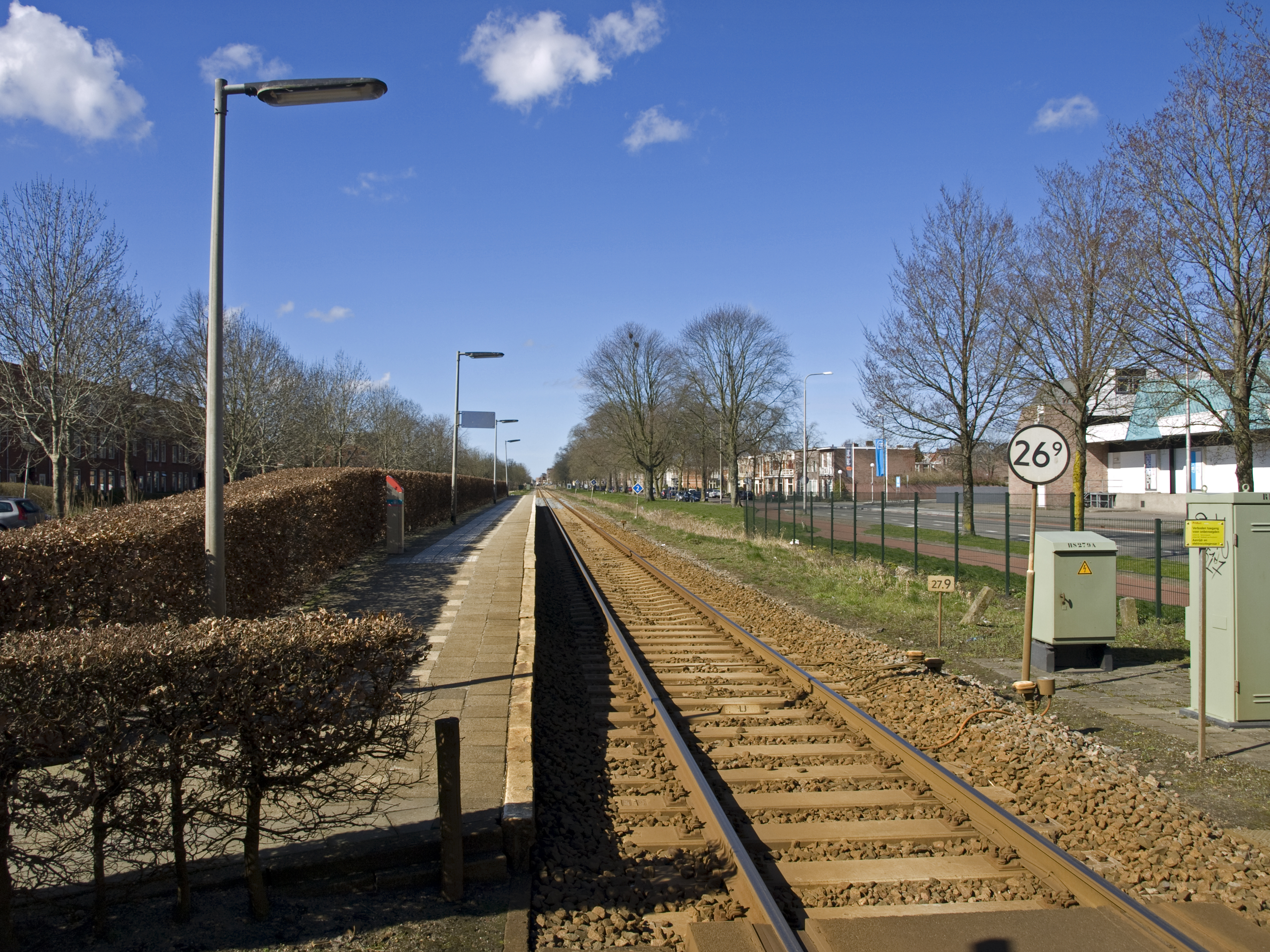
- The western station platform for the train towards Leeuwarden

General information
- Location: Netherlands
- Coordinates: 53°11′56″N 5°48′59″E
- Line: Harlingen–Nieuweschans railway
- Platforms: 2
- Tracks: 1
- Train operators: NS (1952-1999); NoordNed (1999-2004); Arriva (2005-2014)

Construction
- Parking: None
- Cycle facilities: None

Other information
- Station code: AdH

History
- Opened: 5 July 1915; 3 October 1954 (reopened)
- Closed: 19 May 1940; 3 September 2018

Passengers
- 10 (2014); 20 (1997)
Location
- Location within Netherlands

Leeuwarden Achter de Hoven was a railway station serving eastern Leeuwarden, Netherlands. The station was first opened on 5 July 1915 but was closed between 19 May 1940 and 3 October 1954. It is located on the Harlingen–Nieuweschans railway between Leeuwarden and Groningen. Train services were operated by Arriva. As of 2015, most trains between Groningen and Leeuwarden do not stop at the station, and it is not shown on the standard NS map. There was one departure per day in the direction of Leeuwarden and two departures per day in the direction of Groningen.

The station was on an industrial park, and was used almost exclusively by commuters: no buses stopped around the station, and there are hardly any houses in the area that could benefit from the station Although there is only one track, there were two platforms, one in bayonet position, where the train stopped as usual after the level crossing The platforms of Achter de Hoven were relatively far apart, namely a few hundred meters, with the level crossing with Julianastraat and a second level crossing that is located on the FrieslandCampina site.

Leeuwarden Station Achter de Hoven was the least used station in the Netherlands until its closure, with only 10 people boarding or departing per day. On August 31, 2018, the last train stopped at this station.

== Unique Service ==
The station was first opened on July 5, 1915, but closed again on May 19, 1940. the station was reopened on October 3, 1954.

In recent years, the station has only been served three times a day, and then only on working days: once in the morning towards Leeuwarden (western platform of the track), and twice in the afternoon towards Groningen (eastern platform of the track).

There was an OV-chipkaart check in on both platforms. Only on the eastern platform had a train table, and only for the relevant direction (Groningen). The name of the station was only on the screen of the two OV chipkaart check ins and on the departure side. It stated that the trains depart from track 1a, which is apparently the relevant platform, but no platform numbering was specified. There was no ticket machine at the station. There were shelters on the eastern platform. Tactile paving was also applied to guide the blind.

The station was not indicated at all on rail maps.

== Closure ==
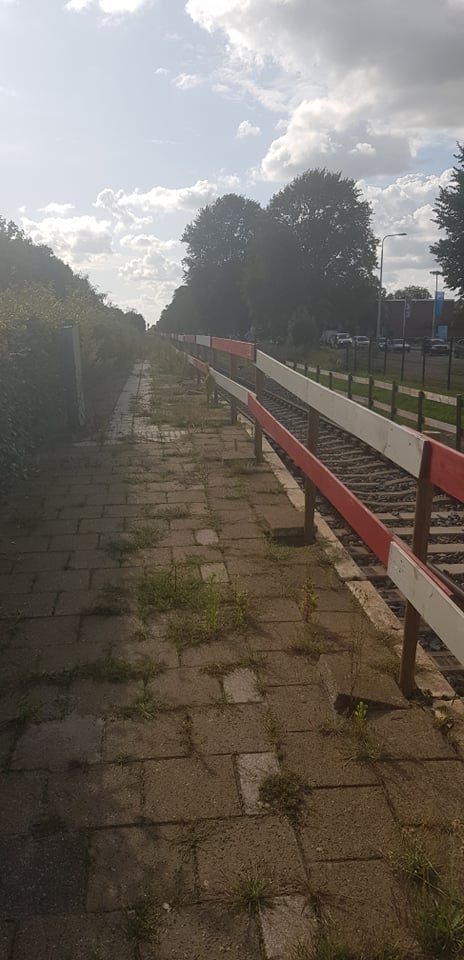
The abandoned western platform in 2019

In 2013, the provinces of Friesland and Groningen agreed to increase the number of passenger trains between Groningen and Leeuwarden. The plan, which was to be completed in 2017, includes demolition of Leeuwarden Achter de Hoven railway station. In 2017, Arriva announced that the trains will not stop any more at the station after 3 September 2018. The platforms were demolished at the end of 2019.

== See also ==
- List of railway stations in Friesland
