= Kingmatille, Dronryp =

Windmill in the Netherlands

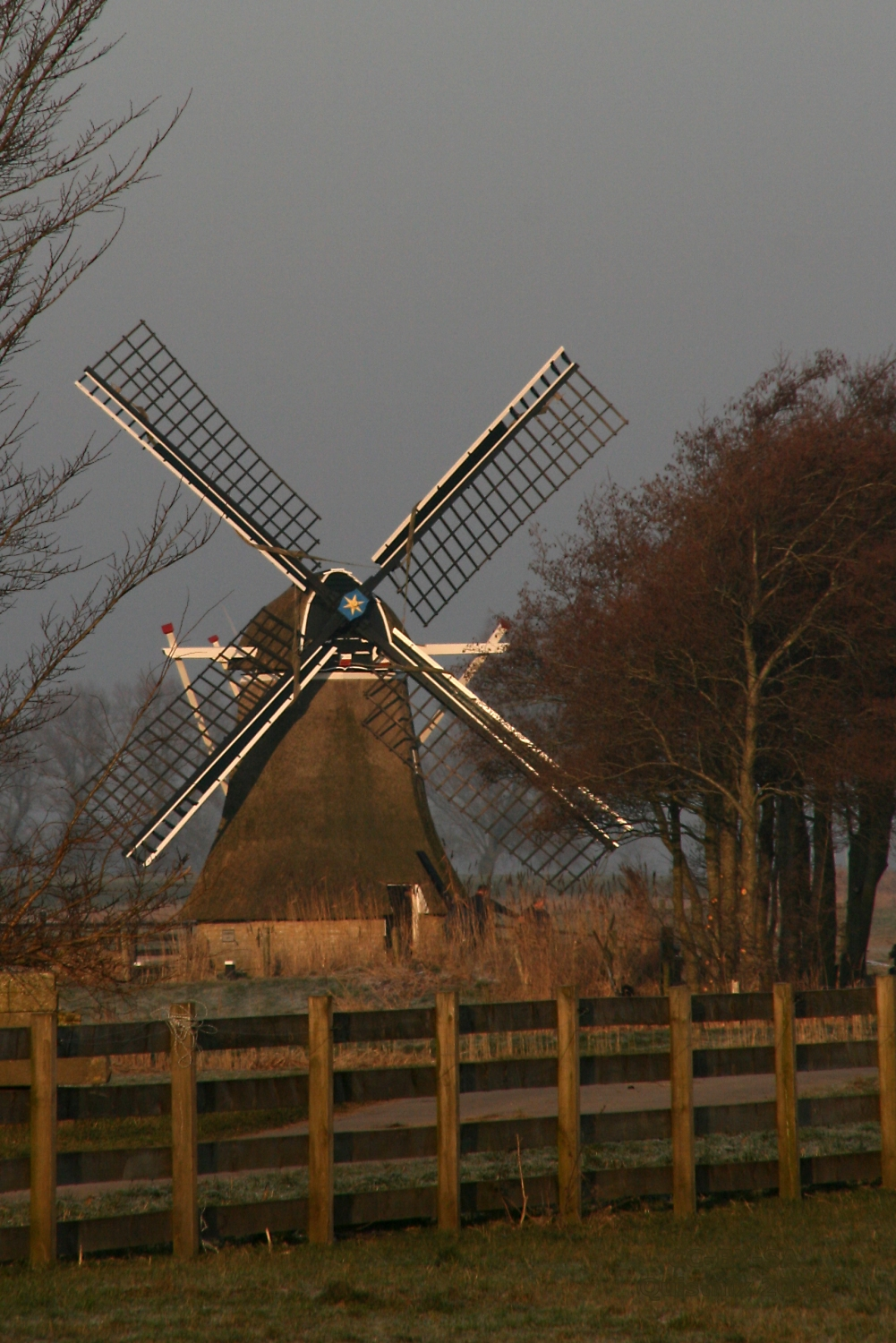
- Kingmatille, December 2008

Origin
- Mill name: Kingmatille
- Mill location: Keimptilsterdyk 12a, 9035 VL Dronryp
- Coordinates: 53°11′07″N 5°36′58″E
- Operator(s): Stichting Molens in Menameradiel
- Year built: 1985

Information
- Purpose: Drainage mill
- Type: Smock mill
- Storeys: Three-storey smock
- Base storeys: One-storey base
- Smock sides: Eight sides
- No. of sails: Four sails
- Type of sails: Common sails
- Windshaft: Cast iron
- Winding: Tailpole and winch
- Type of pump: Archimedes' screw

Kingmatille is a smock mill in Dronryp, Friesland, Netherlands which was moved to its present location in 1985. The mill is listed as a Rijksmonument, number 28614. The windmill is named after the nearby hamlet of Kingmatille.

== History ==
Kingmatille was originally built in 1870 to drain the 80 hectares (200 acres) Van Duinen Polder. It was replaced by a diesel engine. The mill was restored in 1950 and in 1985 it was moved to its present location, by the Hatzumer Polder. The mill was officially opened on 23 October 1991 by Pieter van Vollenhoven. In May 1987, the Archimedes' screw broke. It was repaired by spring 2009.

== Description ==
Kingmatille is a three-storey smock mill on a single-storey base. There is no stage, the sail reaching almost to the ground. The smock and cap thatched. The mill is winded by tailpole and winch. The sails are Common sails. They have a span of 13.00 metres (42 ft 8 in). The sails are carried on a cast-iron windshaft. The windshaft also carries the brake wheel which has 38 cogs. This drives the wallower (20 cogs) at the top of the upright shaft. At the bottom of the upright shaft, the crown wheel, which has 29 cogs drives a gearwheel with 30 cogs on the axle of the wooden Archimedes' screw. The axle of the screw is 280 millimetres (11 in) diameter and the screw is 900 millimetres (2 ft 11 in) diameter and 4.15 metres (13 ft 7 in) long. The screw is inclined at 22°. Each revolution of the screw lifts 193 litres (42 imp gal) of water.

== Public access ==
Kingmatille is open to the public by appointment on Tuesdays and Thursdays.
