= Baaium =

Baijum Baaium
- Village
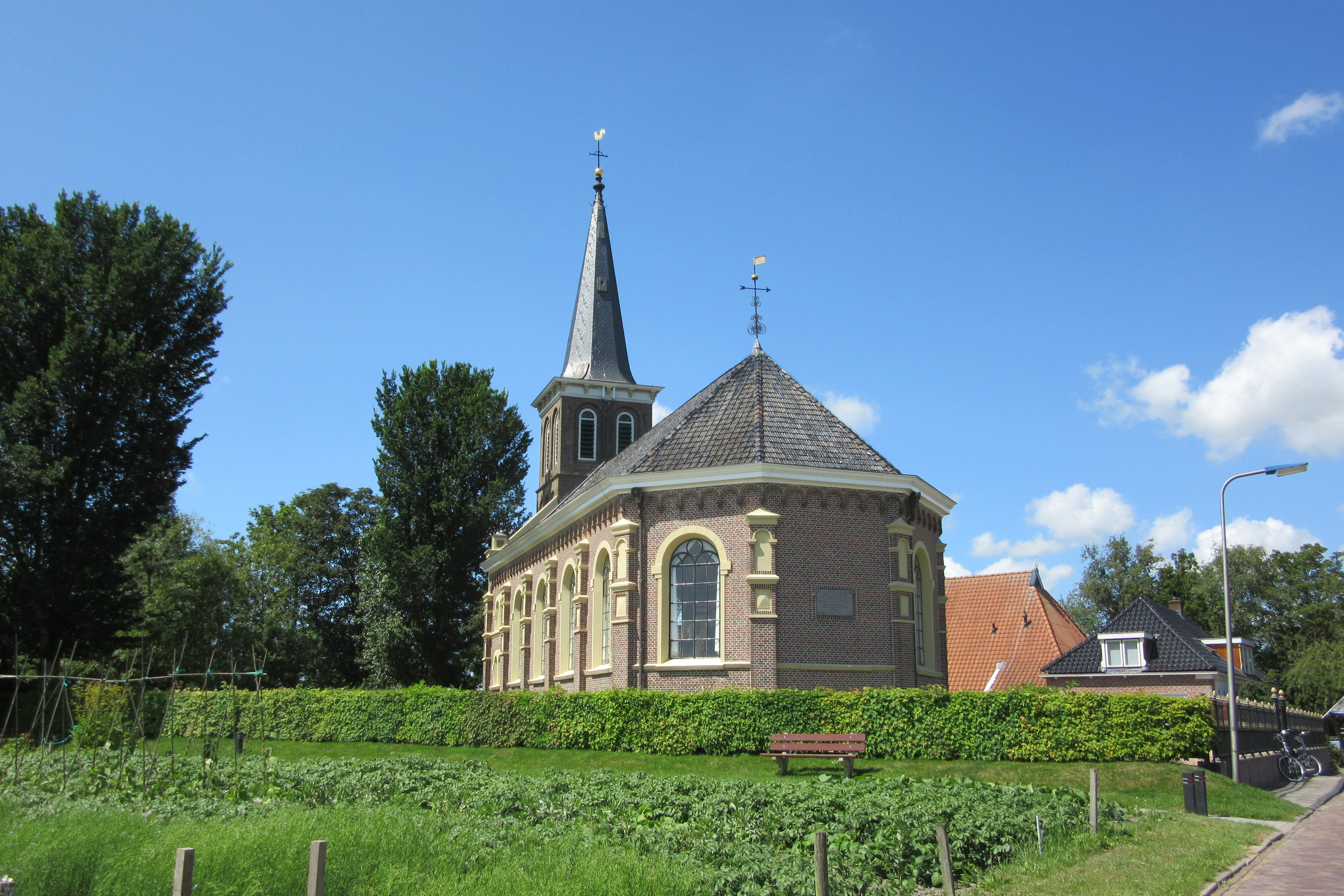
- Baijum church

- Flag Coat of arms

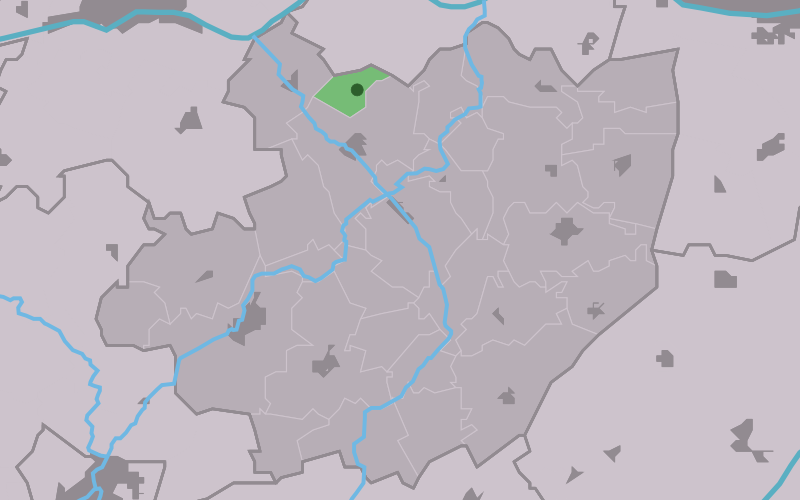
- Location in the former Littenseradiel municipality

- Location in the Netherlands Baijum (Netherlands)
- Country: Netherlands
- Province: Friesland
- Municipality: Waadhoeke

Area
  - Total: 2.15 km^{2} (0.83 sq mi)
- Elevation: 0.8 m (2.6 ft)

Population (2021)
  - Total: 115
  - Density: 53.5/km^{2} (139/sq mi)
- Time zone: UTC+1 (CET)
  - Summer (DST): UTC+2 (CEST)
- Postal code: 8841
- Dialing code: 0517

Baaium (Dutch: Baijum) is a village in the Dutch province of Friesland. It is in the municipality Waadhoeke, about 15 km southwest of the city of Leeuwarden. Baaium had a population of around 118 in January 2017.

== History ==
The village was first mentioned in the 13th century as Baym, and means "settlement of the people of Bado or Beie". In 1186, a priory of the Premonstratensian was founded as St. Michael's Mountain, but became colloquially known as Monniken-Bajum (Monks-Bajum). The monastery was destroyed in 1592. A church was built in the late-12th century. The church was replaced in 1876

Baaium was home to 108 people in 1840. Before 2018, the village was part of the Littenseradiel municipality and before 1984 it belonged to Hennaarderadeel municipality.

== Gallery ==
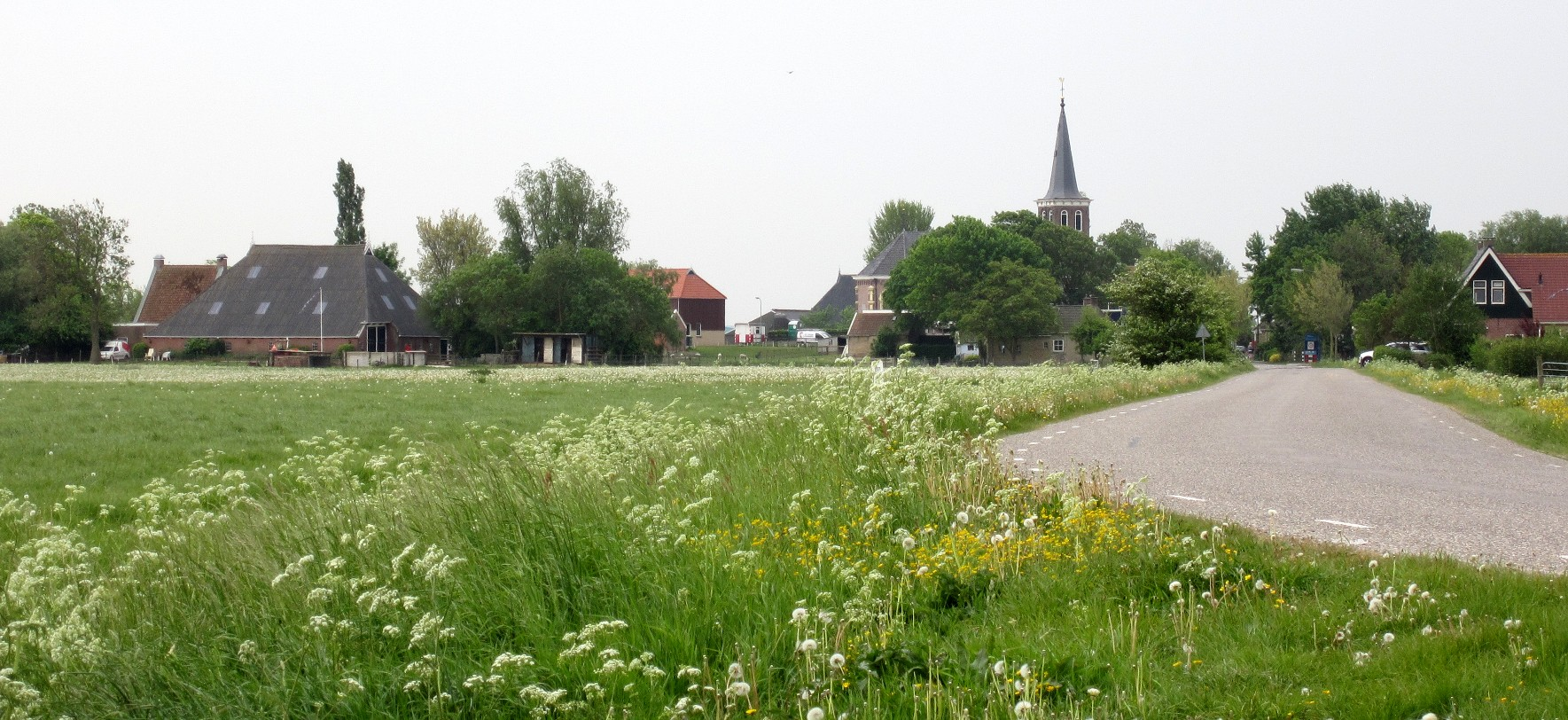
View on Baaium

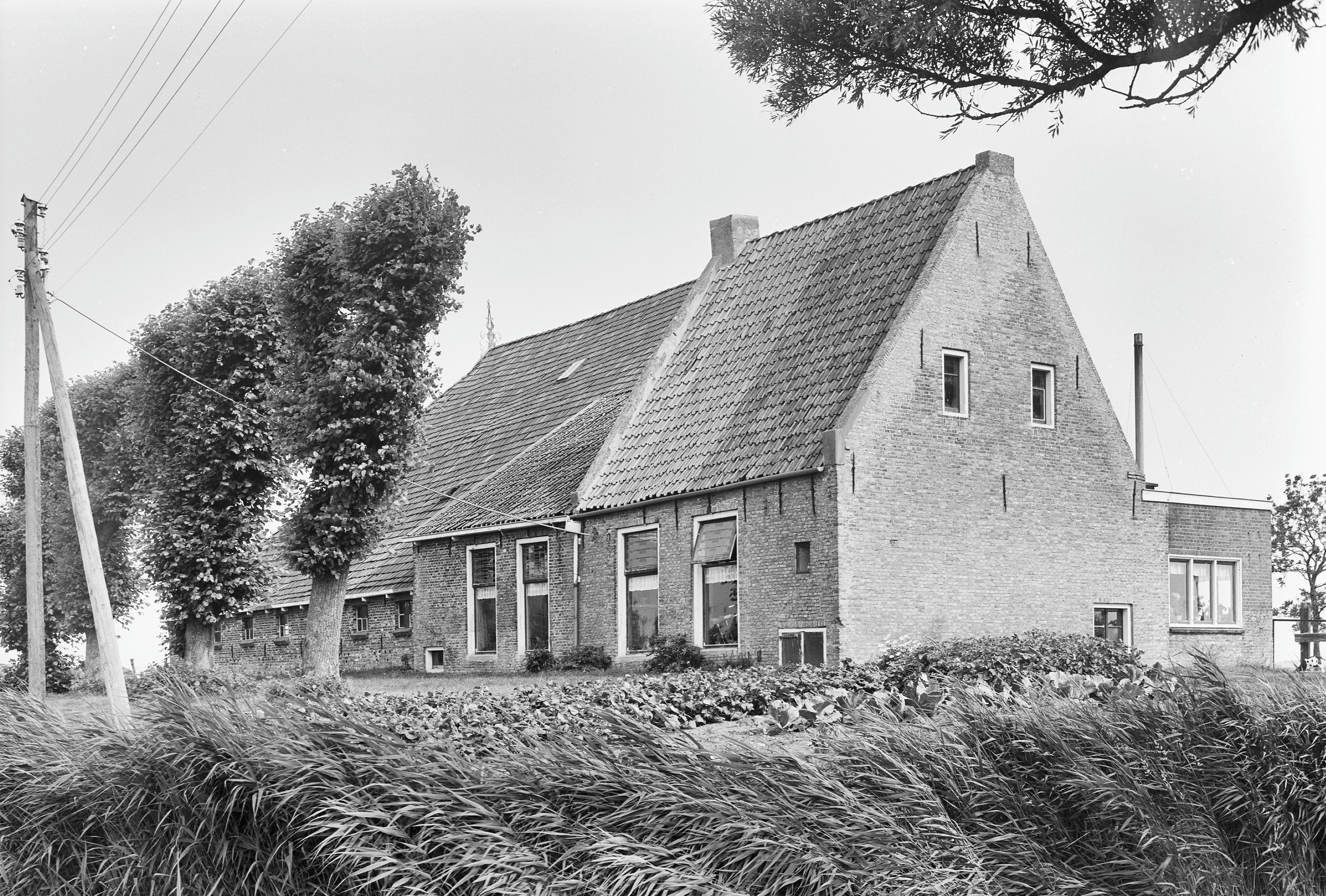
Farm in Baaium (1967)
