= Zweins =

Zweins Sweins
- Village
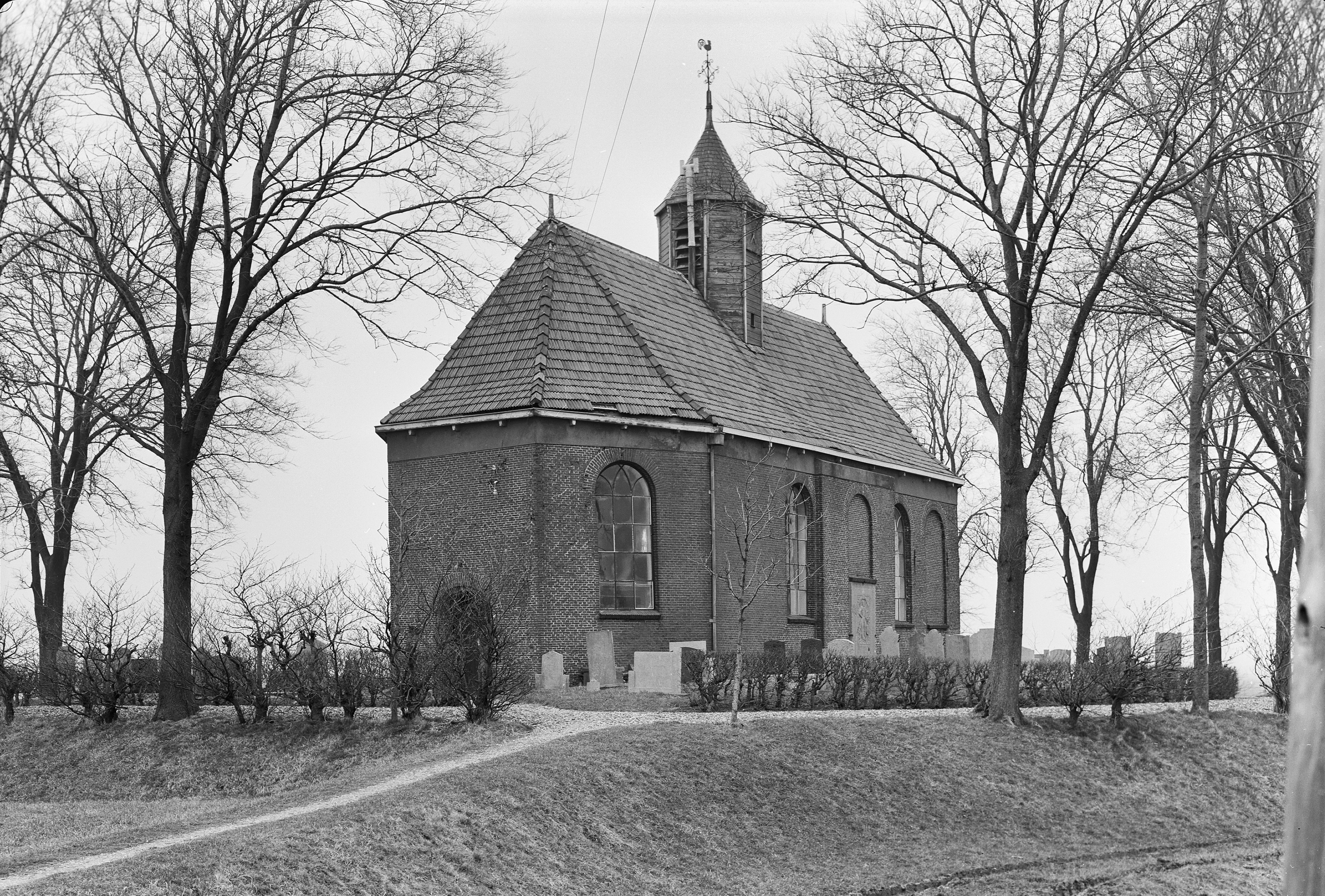
- Regina church (1968)

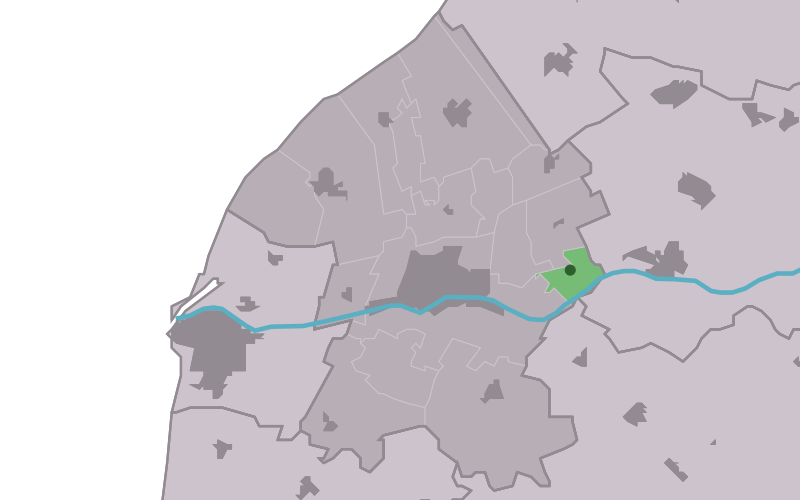
- Location in the Franekeradeel municipality

- Location in the Netherlands Zweins (Netherlands)
- Country: Netherlands
- Province: Friesland
- Municipality: Waadhoeke

Area
  - Total: 2.05 km^{2} (0.79 sq mi)
- Elevation: 0.4 m (1.3 ft)

Population (2021)
  - Total: 125
  - Density: 61.0/km^{2} (158/sq mi)
- Time zone: UTC+1 (CET)
  - Summer (DST): UTC+2 (CEST)
- Postal code: 8814
- Dialing code: 0517

Zweins (West Frisian: Sweins) is a village in Waadhoeke municipality in the province of Friesland, the Netherlands. It had a population of around 116 in January 2014. Before 2018, the village was part of the Franekeradeel municipality.

== History ==
The village was first mentioned in the 13th century as Sueninghe, and means "settlement of the people of Sween (person)". Zweins is a terp (artificial living hill) village. The Dutch Reformed church was built in 1783 as a replacement of a medieval church, and was restored in 2000.

The stins Kingma State was first mentioned in the early 17th century, but was of an earlier date. The van Beyma family who lived at the estate had tried several times to become grietman (predecessor of mayor/judge) in multiple places by buying votes, but failed to get elected mainly due to opposition of the stadtholder. Unable to get elected, Coert Lambertus van Beyma became a leader of the patriots in 1787. The patriots wanted to establish a democratic country, and abolished the stadtholder and noble privileges. The estate was demolished in 1864, and only a 2 hectares (4.9 acres) forest remains.

Zweins was home to 113 people in 1840. Much of the terp was excavated.
