= De Hatsumermolen, Dronryp =

Smock mill in the Netherlands

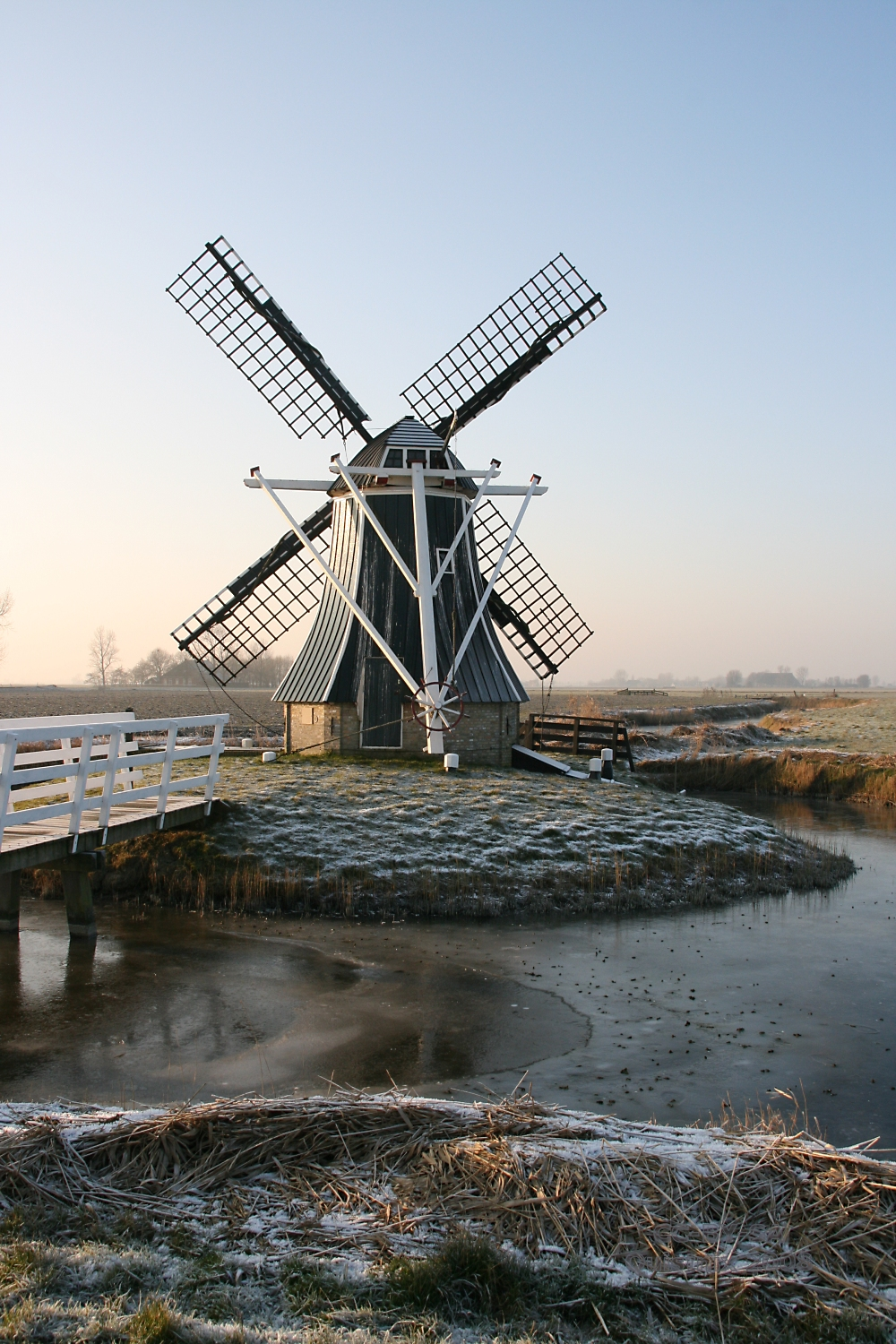
- De Hatsumermolen, December 2008

Origin
- Mill name: De Hatsumermolen
- Mill location: Keimptilsterdyk 2a, 9035 VL Dronryp
- Coordinates: 53°10′46″N 5°37′47″E
- Operator(s): Stichting Molens in Menaldumadeel
- Year built: 1878

Information
- Purpose: Drainage mill
- Type: Smock mill
- Storeys: Two-storey smock
- Base storeys: One-storey base
- Smock sides: Eight sides
- No. of sails: Four sails
- Type of sails: Common sails
- Windshaft: Cast iron
- Winding: Tailpole and winch
- Type of pump: Archimedes' screw

De Hatsumermolen is a smock mill in Dronryp, Friesland, Netherlands which was built in 1878. The mill is listed as a Rijksmonument, number 28615.

== History ==
In 1841, a spinnenkopmolen stood on this site. De Hatsumermolen was built in 1878 by millwright N J Osinga. It drained the 60 hectares (150 acres) Sikma Polder, which formed part of the Hommema State farmstead. Restoration work on the mill began in 1987 and was completed 1990. The mill was officially opened on 23 October 1991 by Pieter van Vollenhoven. Repairs were carried out to the cap in 2003.

== Description ==
De Hatsumermolen is what the Dutch describe as a "grondzeiler" . It is a two-storey smock mill on a single-storey base. There is no stage, the sail reaching almost to the ground. The smock and cap covered in weatherboards, which are vertical on the smock. The mill is winded by tailpole and winch. The sails are Common sails. They have a span of 11.56 metres (37 ft 11 in). The sails are carried on a cast-iron windshaft which was cast by Gietijzerij Hardinxveld of Giessendam, South Holland. The windshaft also carries the brake wheel which has 31 cogs. This drives the wallower (16 cogs) at the top of the upright shaft. At the bottom of the upright shaft, the crown wheel, which has 32 cogs drives a gearwheel with 29 cogs on the axle of the wooden Archimedes' screw. The axle of the screw is 260 millimetres (10 in) diameter and the screw is 900 millimetres (2 ft 11 in) diameter and 3.75 metres (12 ft 4 in) long. The screw is inclined at 34°. Each revolution of the screw lifts 111 litres (24 imp gal) of water.

== Public access ==
De Hatsumermolen is open to the public by appointment.
