= Dronryp =

Dronryp Dronrijp
- Village
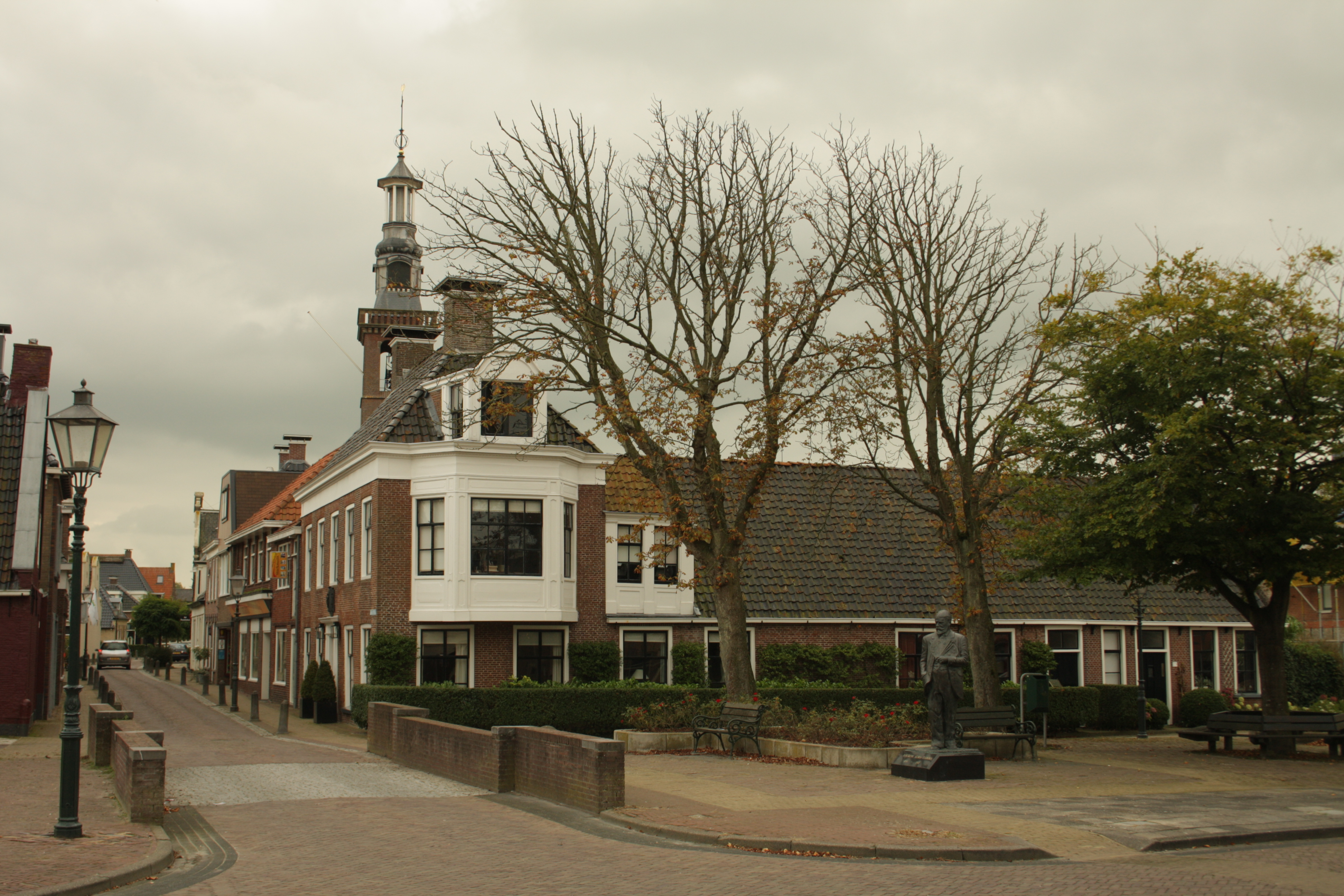
- Street in 2010

- Flag Coat of arms

- Location in the province of Friesland in the Netherlands

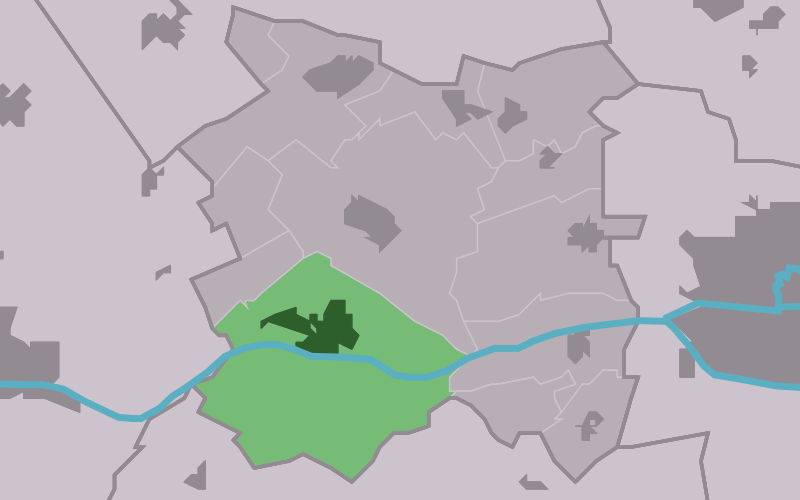
- Location in the municipality of Menameradiel

- Location in the Netherlands Dronryp (Netherlands)
- Coordinates: 53°12′N 5°39′E
- Country: Netherlands
- Province: Friesland
- Municipality: Waadhoeke

Area
  - Total: 15.83 km^{2} (6.11 sq mi)
- Elevation: 0.7 m (2.3 ft)

Population (2021)
  - Total: 3,275
  - Density: 206.9/km^{2} (535.8/sq mi)
- Time zone: UTC+1 (CET)
  - Summer (DST): UTC+2 (CEST)
- Postal code: 9035
- Dialing code: 0517

Dronryp (Dutch: Dronrijp) is a village in the Dutch municipality of Waadhoeke. On 1 January 2017, it had 3,281 inhabitants.

== History and architecture ==
Before 2018, the village was part of the Menameradiel municipality. A few centuries BC, a settlement developed around where the street Tsjerkebuorren is now (Stenvert et al., 2000). Another settlement came into existence nearby when a canal between Leeuwarden and Harlingen was completed in 1507. (Part of it was filled up in 1940.) Between roughly 1850 and 1950, these two gradually merged.

The oldest known reference to the village dates from 1132, when it was called Denningrip, meaning a "rip" (narrow stretch of land) where a family called Drenninga lived.

Of the old mansions in the area only the early 18th century Schatzenburg remains.

== Miscellaneous information ==
The van Harinxmakanaal, completed in 1953, runs along the south side of the town. The A31 runs along the north side. Dronryp also has a railway station.

Painter Sir Lawrence Alma-Tadema was born in the house at Dûbelestreek 2, Eise Eisinga, famous for his planetarium, at Tsjerkebuorren 13.

== Transportation ==
- Dronryp railway station

== Windmills ==
There are three windmills in Dronryp; De Poelen, Kingmatille, and the Hatsumermolen.

== Gallery ==
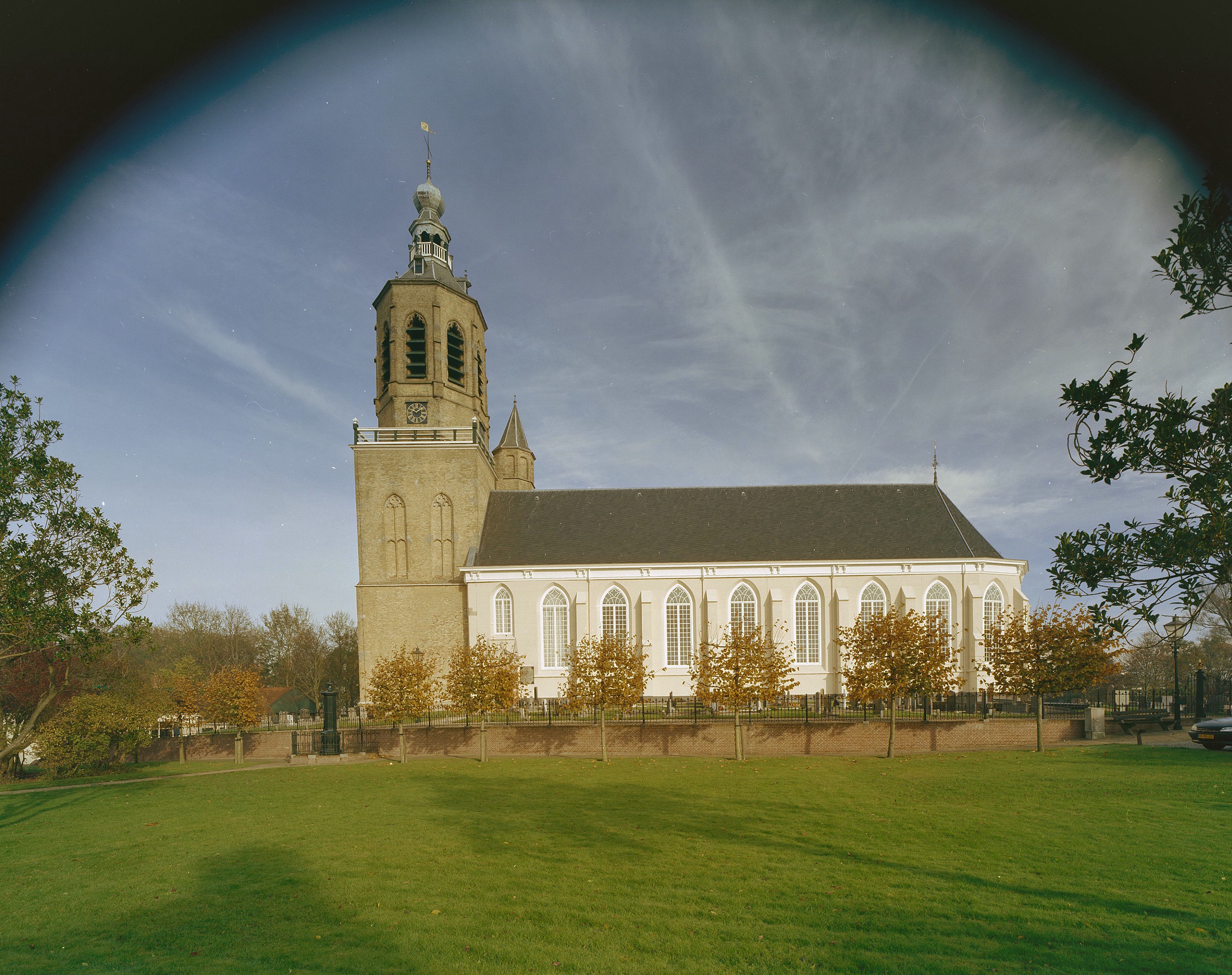
Church of Dronryp

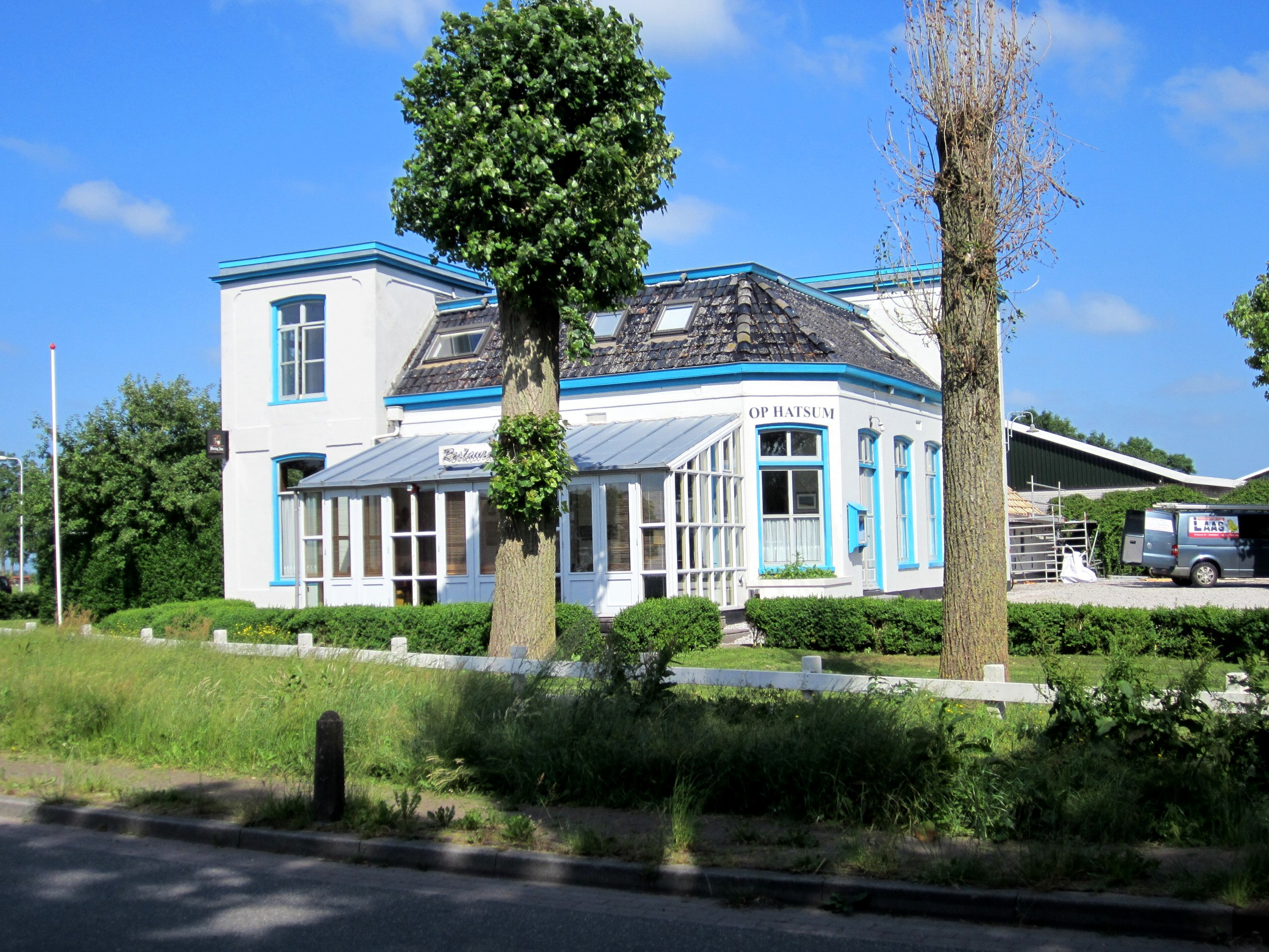
Restaurant "Op Hatsum"

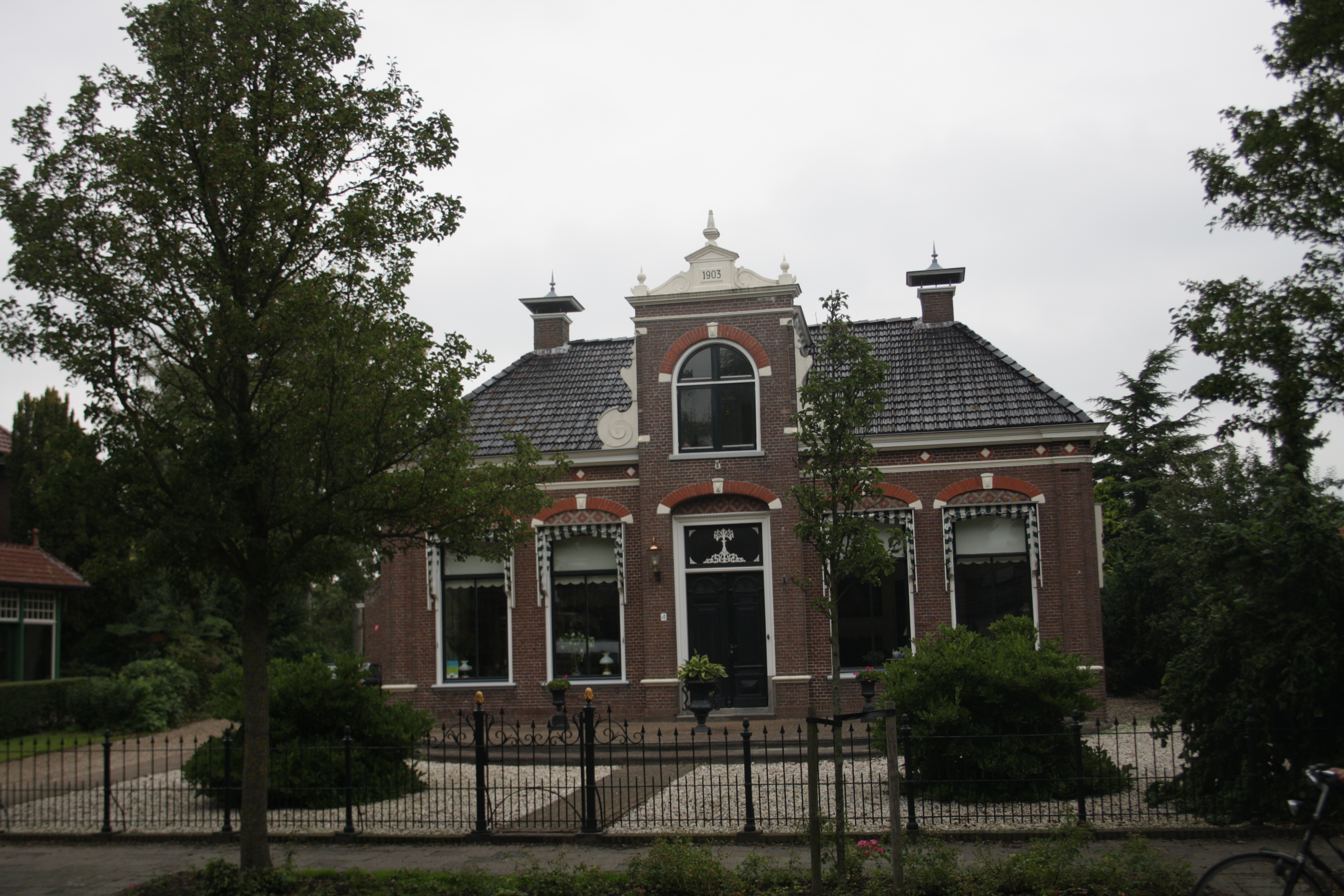
House in Dronryp

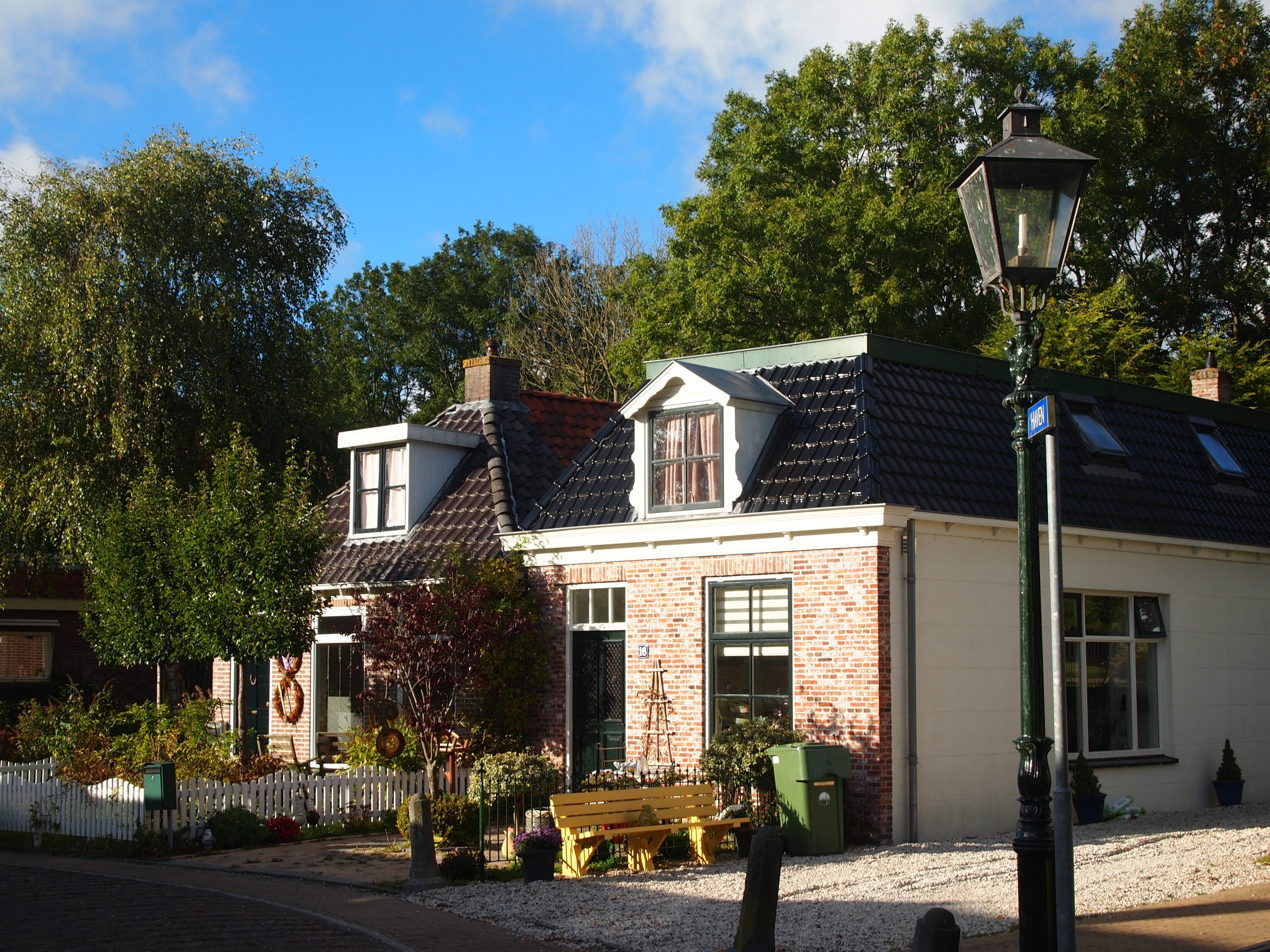
Houses in Dronryp
