= Van Aitzema =

Van Aitzema is a surname of West Frisian origin. Notable people named van Aitzema include the following:

- Foppe van Aitzema (1580–1637), council to the Duke of Brunswick
- Lieuwe van Aitzema (1600–1669), Dutch historian, diplomat, bon-vivant, philanderer and spy
