= Simon Beaumont (disambiguation) =

Simon Beaumont (born 1975) is an Australian rules footballer.

Simon Beaumont may also refer to:

== Characters ==
- Simon Beaumont, character in Ravenswood (TV series)
- Simon Beaumont, character in The Bill played by Nicholas Burns (actor)

== Others ==
- Simon Beaumont, candidate in Mersey St Marys
- Simon van Beaumont, see Foppe van Aitzema
