= Jurjen =

Jurjen is a Dutch given name. Notable people with this name include:

- Jurjen Battjes (born 1939), Dutch civil engineer
- Jurjen Bosch (born 1985), Dutch football player
- Jurjen Ferdinand Koksma (1904–1964), Dutch mathematician
- Jurrie Koolhof (full name Jurjen) (born 1960), Dutch football player and manager
