= Cornelius Kempius =

Dutch historian

Cornelius Kempius (1516 - Groningen, 1589) was a Dutch historian who is known for his work on Friesland.

== Biography ==
Kempius was born into a Catholic family in Dokkum, and after going to school in Groningen he studied law, and received his master's degree, in Cologne. His magnum opus is De origine, situ, qualitate et quantitate Frisia, et rebus a Frisiis olim praeclare gestis (Cologne, 1588). His booklet discusses the history, geography, and notoriety of Friesland.

== Edition ==
- Cornelius Kempius, De origine, situ, qualitate Frisiae, et rebus a Frisiis olim præclarè gestis, Cologne 1588

== Literature ==
- Bolhuis van Zeeburgh, J. (1873). Kritiek der Friesche geschiedschrijving.
