= Catharina Cramer =

German-Dutch midwife

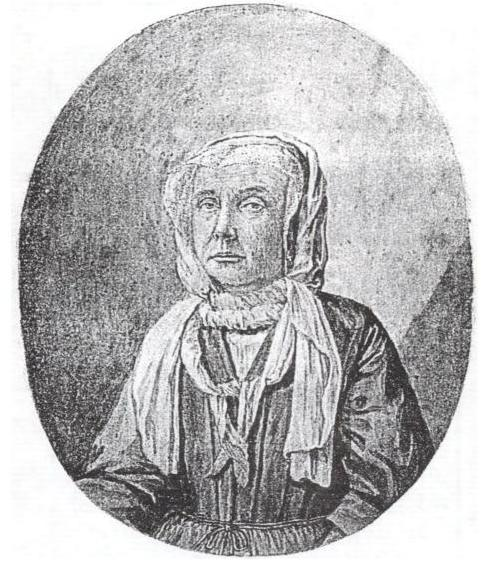
Wash drawing of Catherina Schrader by J Folkema in 1714. The original is in the Iconographical Office, The Hague, Netherlands.

Catharina Geertruida Schrader (1656–1746), also known as the Frisian Midwife (from the Dutch province Friesland), was a successful Dutch midwife in the Early Modern Era, known for her detailed notebooks and memoirs relating the numerous births she participated in.

== Personal life ==
Catharina Schrader was born in Bentheim, Holy Roman Empire. Her father was Friedrich Schrader and her mother was Gertrud Nibberich. She was the oldest daughter of the family, and records indicate that she had at least four brothers and one sister. Due to political and religious unrest, she and several members of her family were forced to move to Leiden (Netherlands) in the late 1670s, as she was a teenager.

She was married to Ernst Wilhelm Cramer from 1683 to 1692. They first stayed in Bentheim and had two daughters, then moved to Hallum in 1686 where they had four more children. It wasn't long after their last child was born that Ernst Wilhelm Cramer died, leaving Catharina a widow, with six children to raise.

She set up her practice as a midwife in January 1693, only a year after the death of her husband. Her profession caused her to travel often and even to stay over at her patients' for long periods of time. Tired of the tedious journeys and wanting to spend more time with her children (the eldest was 10 at the time), she decided to move to Dokkum in 1695.

In 1713, she married Thomas Higt, a gold and silversmith who played a leading role in the local government of Dokkum. Their marriage was quite uneventful, and lasted until Thomas Higt died in 1720, once again leaving Catharina a widow.

In 1718, she assisted with the delivery of her first grandchild.

Even as she was growing old, she had a robust health, and she practiced midwifery until the end of her life. Her last recorded delivery was dated February 7, 1745; she was 88 years old.

== Widows in the Early Modern period ==
Widowhood was more consequential for women than it was for men, for married women were entirely dependent on their husbands. Being a widow was often synonymous of financial hardship; widows were often forced to depend on public or religious charity, more than married women did. Catharina was not an exception and did struggle financially in the first years of her widowhood. Widows also had a negative image in this period: they were seen as "ugly old crones or as greedy and sexually rapacious women looking for their next husbands." Widowers tended to remarry a lot more easily than widows. The older they were and the more children they had, the more difficult it was for widows to find a new husband.

However, widowhood could also provide social and financial opportunities for women. They tended to be more empowered as widows than as married women. Because the woman was under her husband's power, when he died, part of that power was passed on to his wife. Widows could inherit the family money and dispose of it as they wished. They would become the head of the household and have great power over their children, deciding of the dowry for their daughters and assisting their sons in gaining more political influence. Depending on what the husband's occupation was, it could get passed on to his wife as well. This meant that if a man was a business-owner, his widow could even have control over that business.

Historians assert that becoming a widow also empowered a woman because according to church and state, she had officially fulfilled her duty as a woman – marrying and most likely having children. So when a woman's husband died, she had done all that she could as a woman, in their eyes.

Catharina chose to take up midwifery after her first husband died. As a widow, she had more freedom to travel and practice. She didn't practice much during her second marriage but proceeded to pick it back up when she became a widow again.

== Midwifery: the art of assisting childbirth ==
Women's input in medicine evolved throughout human history. In the Roman Empire, some physicians expected midwives to have a thorough knowledge of anatomy, and in the Middle Ages, women were involved and accepted in medicine. In the thirteenth century, however, women doctors disappeared and got excluded from the medical field, except for midwifery. Midwives were respected and feared, for if they could save lives, they could kill too. Up to the eighteenth century, men were completely excluded from the event of childbirth. Physicians did not care about gynecology, and women preferred to give birth in the presence of midwives. Female relatives and women from the community too would attend labor to help and provide support. Indeed, in representations of labor scenes from that period, we can see only women were present during delivery.

If midwifery was solely a woman's job before Catharina Schrader's time, this was not true anymore in the eighteenth century. As Catharina Schrader was starting her practice, men were more and more involved in childbirth, discrediting midwives' work, experience and knowledge. Women used to be considered as having an innate and natural talent for midwifery, but with the man-midwives' growing input in the field, they quickly became the target of accusations when deliveries had bad outcomes, accused either of procrastination or of impatience and aggressiveness, but, most of all, of ignorance. This long-established tradition of midwifery was becoming increasingly professionalized and masculinized. This shift started originally with the French and English aristocracy who began seeking the help of male physicians during labor as early as the mid-seventeenth century. Along with the increasing influence of man-midwives, laws and regulations pertaining to the practice of midwifery began to appear, discrediting midwives' skills and legitimacy further. For, before the seventeenth century's legislation establishing courses for future midwives to be trained, women who wanted to practice midwifery would be trained by experienced, older midwives, often the woman's mother. Here is an example of how people developed a condescending attitude towards midwives, in a document written in 1755 in Grenoble, France: "but as they know that a quantity of women without names, without titles, without abilities, and without morals are meddling with the births of this town, putting children at risk and doing illegal business, and not knowing the art of childbirth, which is in fact quite difficult; even more so is the theory than the practice, [they] maim or let children perish and the mothers."

There existed many superstitions and fears linked to childbirth and maternity, in the Early Modern Era. For example: "[People] believed strongly in the possibility that strong emotions or intensively looking at something during pregnancy could cause deformities in the expected child." As ignorance still prevailed concerning conception, pregnancy and female anatomy and antibiotics and antiseptic measures were lacking, a great fear surrounded childbirth. Indeed, birthing was very risky, for the mother as well as for the child. As Hilary Marland put it in her introduction to the memoirs of Catharina Schrader, there was a "constant fear of death or illness which was linked to maternity; a skillful or inventive midwife could be seen as actively tackling, "engaging in battle", these very real dangers. Death was a frequent accompaniment of pregnancy and childbirth for the mother, child or both. Bearing children, especially if complications set in, could be terrifying, dangerous and fatal." It is estimated that one out of ten women died during labor and one out of three children would not reach the age of one.

Man-midwives tended to be more aggressive in their attitude and techniques as opposed to midwives. They were the ones who used instruments (such as crotchets). Even experienced midwives, like Catharina Schrader, did not feel comfortable doing so and would delegate. The use of forceps was actually forbidden to midwives for they were not physicians: only the men could use them.

== The Frisian Midwife ==
It was after the death of her first husband, Ernst Wilhelm Cramer, that Catharina Schrader started to practice midwifery, in 1693, in the villages around Hallum. Having six children to care for, she needed a way to financially support her family. Between 1695 and 1713, while living in Dokkum, she managed to build a large practice in a short amount of time, and she assisted in more than a hundred deliveries a year. After getting remarried, however, Catharina slowed down her practice. Articles suggest that this could be because her family was more financially stable thanks to her remarrying. During that time, she still continued to practice here and there, including for the deliveries of her daughters. After the death of her second husband, she picked it back up and remained quite active despite her old age.

Her clientele covered all levels of society, and her pay depended on the patient's social status. She usually got paid less than three guilders, but she could get paid up to fifty guilders although those were very rare instances. Her pay could also depend on her workload, because sometimes she would stay at the house of her patient for six weeks. For an average two-day labor she was paid about two guilders, which at that time was around the weekly wage of a skilled laborer. Between 1696 and 1712 she earned between two and three hundred guilders a year. Although, people sometimes did not pay, so she kept a page of creditors in her notebook. There were more births in July and August than in the rest of the year. In 1706 she attended 137 deliveries. As she got older and could not travel as much, most of the deliveries took place in Dokkum. Dokkum was a popular place that she visited often throughout her life. Catharina had close friends in that area, who were part of the ministry; she would go there to assist their personal deliveries, like the wife of a preacher, and other townspeople with difficult deliveries.

She delivered the last baby in 1745 at the age of 88. She was quite wealthy towards the end of her life, after her second husband died. She even had five houses in her name.

Catharina became a very experienced midwife. She recorded about 3000 cases of childbirth in her notebooks. She traveled around to help with difficult deliveries. During her career more than 92% of babies survived childbirth, a much better figure than is reported in other places at that time. She does not appear to have used any of the obstetric equipment, such as forceps, developed around that time in Holland. As a matter of fact, instrumental deliveries were exceptional. If needed, she would most likely have asked a man to use an instrument: she recorded six cases of herself using a crotchet, and ten asking a man-midwife to do so. She was very active and vivacious during deliveries. She participated in very risky births and was often called for lost cases.

== Published work ==
Catharina Schrader kept notebooks, originally entitled "Memoryboeck van de Vrouwens", in which she recorded 3060 deliveries. There exist nine of them and they cover January 9, 1693, through February 7, 1745. Along with the details of the births themselves, her journal entries included financial information, the mother's information, and prayers. When she retired, she wrote her memoirs that were later published and translated, in which she went over 122 of the most difficult cases she encountered, in greater detail, with the hope of helping other midwives. If her notebooks were for her own records, her memoirs were written as a guide for her successors.

Catharina would write an entry on the same day she helped a mother birth a child. The reason her entries were so detailed is that she wished her apprentices and successors to have access to her experience and knowledge.

Catharina also kept a separate diary for gynecological and surgical work. This was kept in as much detail as her birth cases.

Her journals and memoirs were not too hard to interpret and translate. She wrote in a language that showed her Germanic and Frisian background's influence.

Every new year started with a prayer in Catharina's journals. Here is her journal entry of the beginning of the year 1727:

Here begins again in the name of The Lord the year 1727
Oh Lord, it is again that I was sent for this purpose by the way of Your Godly providence to help my fellow men. So give me then again with this new year new force and strength in my body in my great old age….

It can be observed that religion played an important role in her profession. She believed that God gifted her with this talent of midwifery, and she must honor it by helping others with it. "Through her voice we can hear the seriousness with which she and many others undertook their vocation."
