= Idan Cohen =

Idan Cohen may refer to:

- Idan Cohen (choreographer) (born 1978), Israeli choreographer and opera director
- Idan Cohen (footballer) (born 1996), Israeli soccer player
