= Sharon Vazanna =

Israeli choreographer, dancer, and teacher working internationally

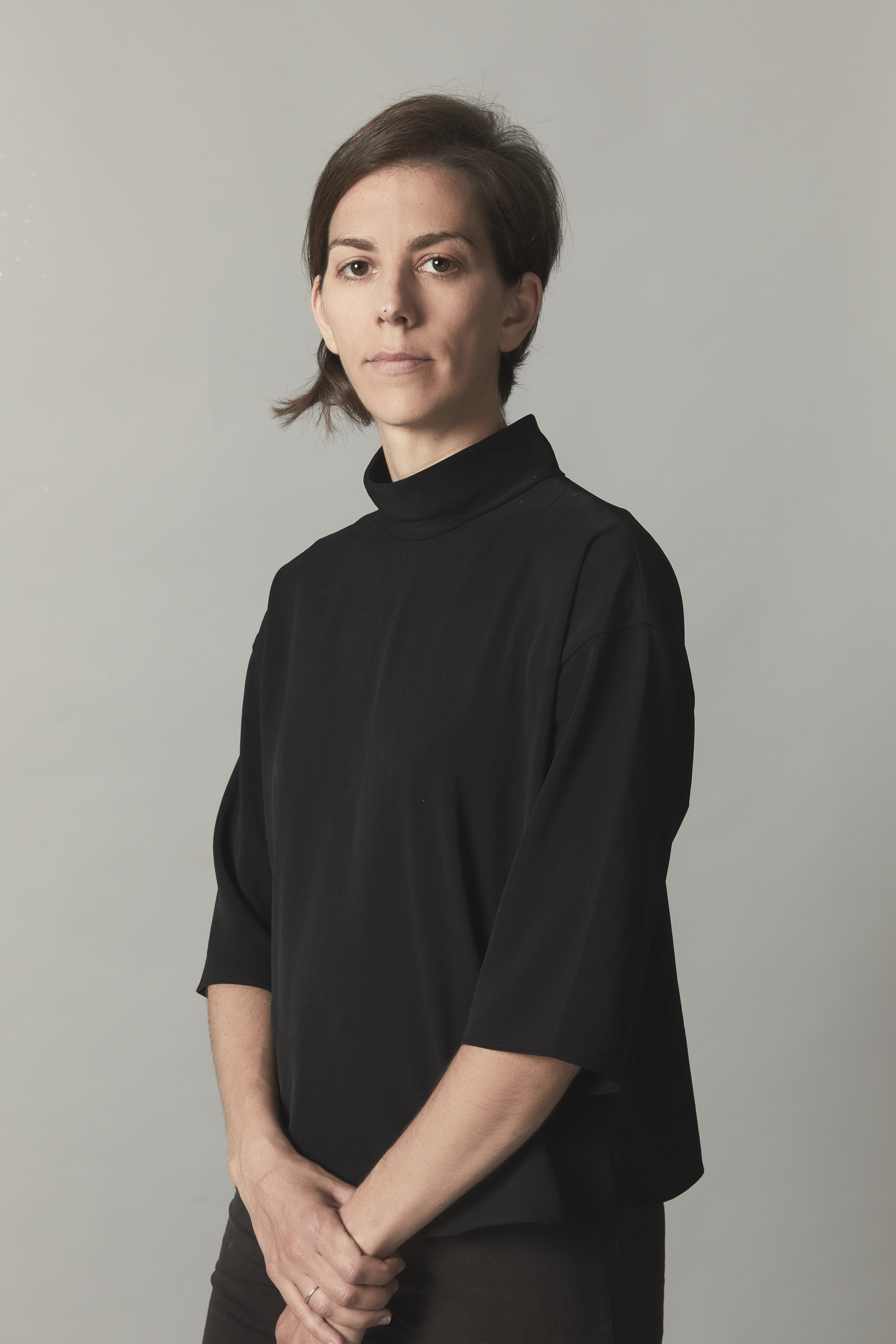
- Born: 1982 (age 43–44); Dokkum, Netherlands
- Occupations: Dancer, Dance teacher
- Awards: 2009 - Recognized by the Ministry of Immigrant Absorption as an Outstanding Artist for returning residents. 2012 - Winner of the Dancer Award at the International Choreography Competition in Copenhagen, Denmark. 2013 - Her creation "Red Fields" won the Audience Award at the MASDANZA Choreography Competition, Spain. 2017 - Her creation "Transparent Borders" won First Prize at the Choreography Competition at the Fringe Theatre in Be'er Sheva. 2019 - Winner of the Minister of Culture Award for Artistic Dance.
- Website: sharonvazanna.com

Sharon Vazanna (Hebrew: שרון וזנה; born 1982) is an Israeli choreographer, dancer, and teacher working internationally.

== Early life and education ==
Vazanna was born in Dokkum, the Netherlands, and immigrated to Israel with her family at the age of three. She was drawn to dance from a young age, beginning her training at five with Shosh Gilad in Karkur and continuing her studies at the Hof Carmel Dance Studio. As a teenager, she created choreographies for school ceremonies and youth performances.

== Career ==
In 2000, at 18, Vazanna moved to the Netherlands and began her bachelor's degree at the Codarts Dance Academy in Rotterdam. In 2003, she joined the company of Dutch choreographer Anouk van Dijk. A year later, she participated in a project by Italian choreographer Veronica Riz in Bolzano.

From 2004 to 2006, she was a dancer with the Kibbutz Contemporary Dance Company under the artistic direction of Rami Be'er. Culture critic Merav Yudelevich wrote about her performance in "Ekodom": "Vazanna's solo is one of the most beautiful moments in the show." Yudelevich noted that her "freedom of movement recalls the primality of Isadora Duncan." In 2006, Vazanna choreographed her own piece for the company's Creative Dancers program, called "Layers".

From 2007 to 2009, Vazanna danced with the Cullberg Ballet and participated in works by Crystal Pite, Johan Inger, Mats Ek, and Alexander Ekman. She also performed in Ekman's dance film "40 M Under". During this time, she had created her own solo and duet pieces for the company's Creative Dancers program.

In 2009, Vazanna returned to Israel. That year, she danced as a freelancer with Israeli choreographers Idan Cohen, Idan Sharabi and others. Also, she participated in the repertoire project of the Israeli Opera and the Suzanne Dellal Center, directed by Maté Moray, in works by William Forsythe and Jacopo Godani.

In 2010, Vazanna began to create her own dance pieces. In 2012, she founded her dance company, "Speaking Bodies". That same year, she won the Best Performing Dancer award at the Cross Connection choreography competition in Copenhagen, Denmark.

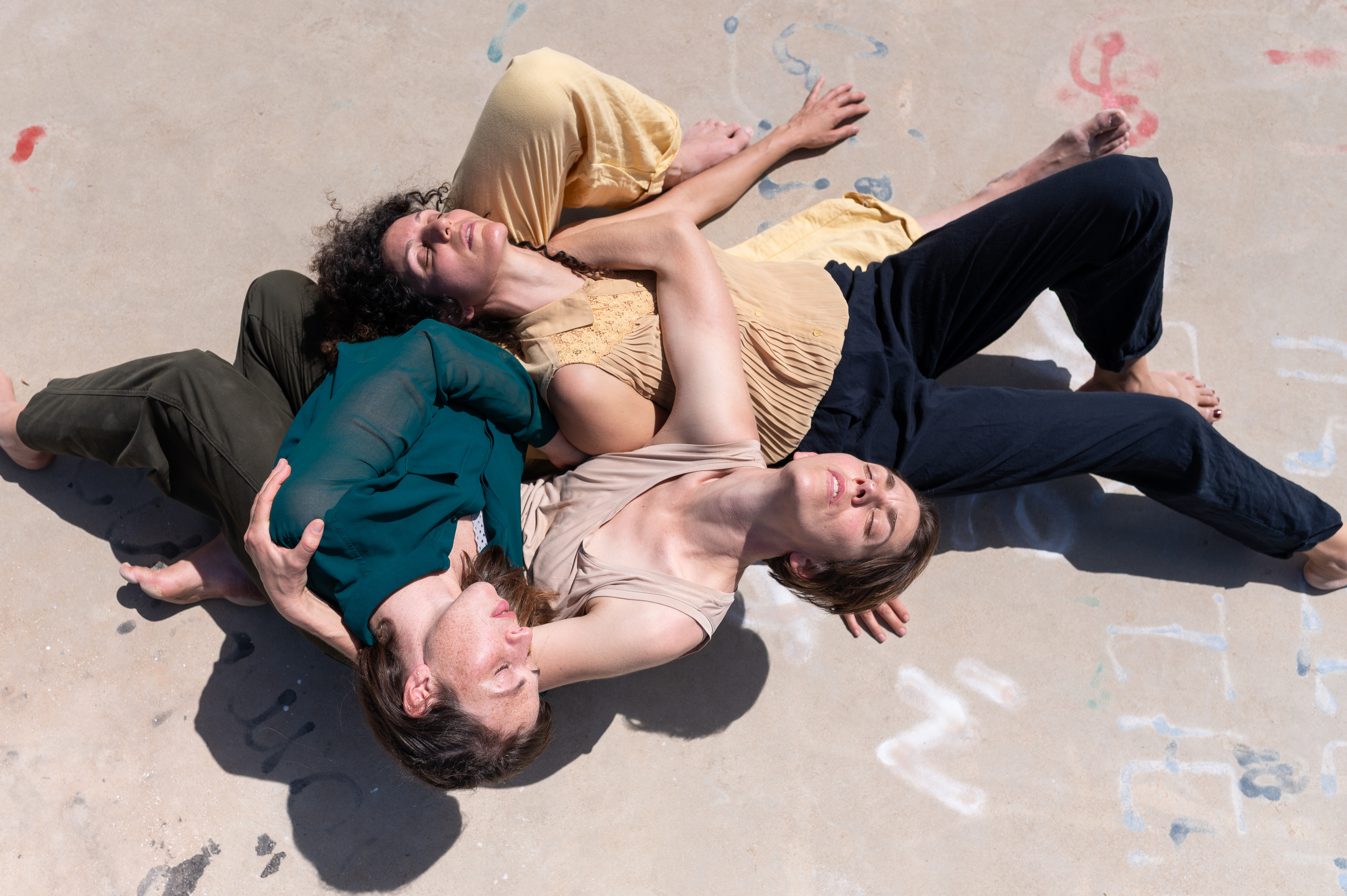
From "Mother Work"

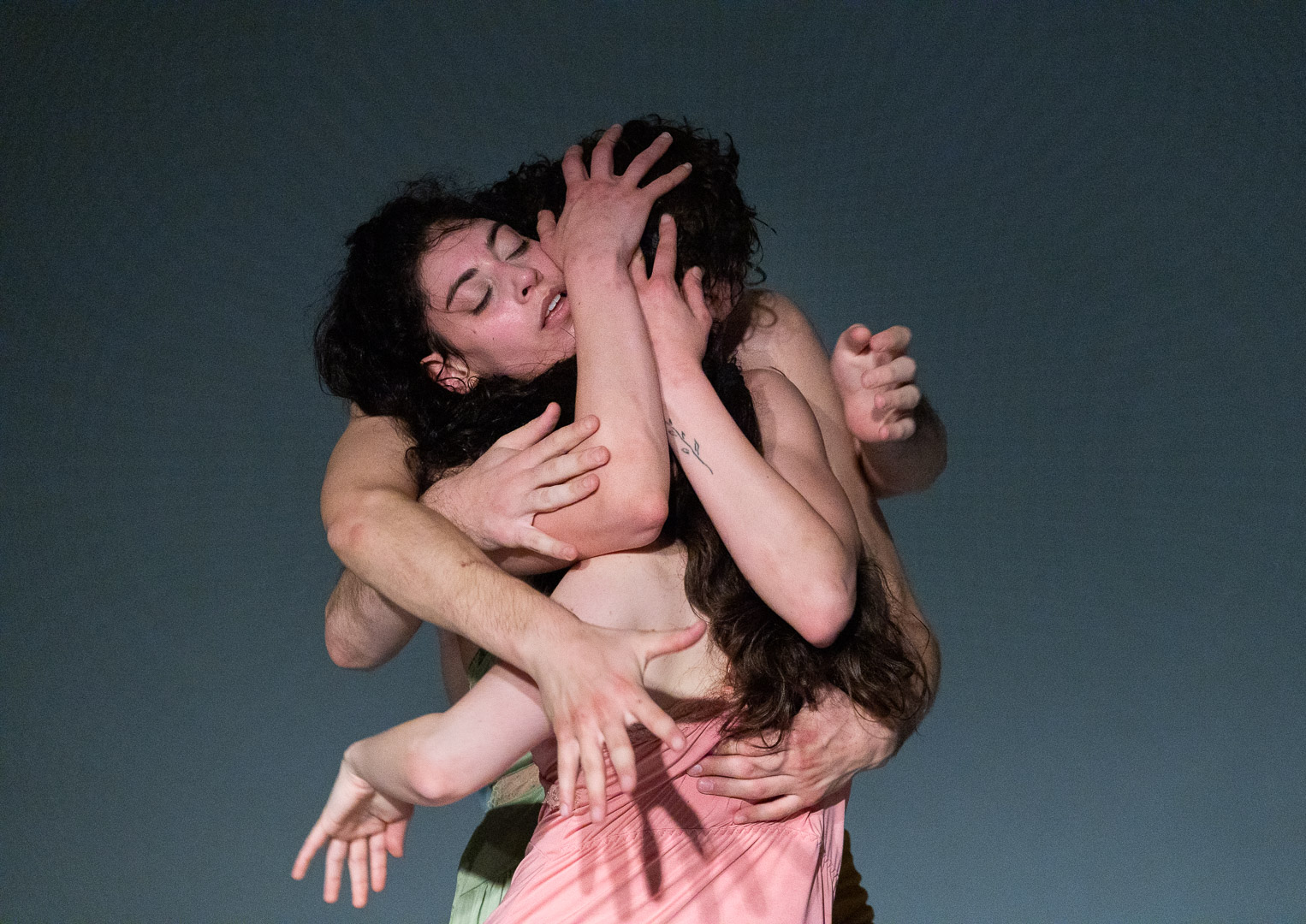
From "The Swing"

Her works have been performed both in Israel and abroad, and earned her several awards. In Israel, her pieces were presented at venues such as: Curtain Up Project, C.A.T.A.M.O.N. Dance Group in Jerusalem, the International Exposure Festival at the Suzanne Dellal Center, the International Choreography Competition at "Machol Shalem" in Jerusalem, Tel Aviv Dance Festival. At the same time, her works have been presented at festivals, competitions, theaters and museums around the world, such as: Korzo Theater in the Netherlands, 92Y New York, "Uffo" Theater in the Czech Republic, the International Solo Competition in Stuttgart, the International Choreography Competition in Hanover, the International Choreography Competition in Copenhagen, the MASDANZA Festival in the Canary Islands, the HIGH Museum in Atlanta - as part of the CORE Dance Company Festival, the Bern Konzert Theatre Festival in Switzerland, and the Mambo Museum of Modern Art in Bologna.

Alongside her artistic work, Vazanna continued to pursue academic studies. In 2013, she began her M.DANCE degree in choreography and composition at the Jerusalem Academy of Music and Dance. In 2015, she was accepted as a member of the Israeli Choreographers Association. In 2019, she was awarded the Minister of Culture Award in artistic dance for young choreographers. That same year, she received her teaching certificate from the Kibbutzim College.

Vaznna was invited to participate in artist residencies in dance in Israel and abroad: in 2013, she participated in a research and creative residency in Tenerife, Spain; in the same year, she also created her work "Transparent Borders" during an artist residency in Sweden, commissioned by ilDANCE; in 2014, she participated in an artist residency in Bologna, Italy, where she created her work "HIGH" commissioned by the Running Up The Hill Residency Program; in 2016, she was invited to an artist residency, creation, and teaching at Muhlenberg College, Pennsylvania, United States, on behalf of the Shusterman Foundation and the Israel Institute; later, in 2023–2024, she was invited to a one-year artist residency for creation and teaching at the Hong Kong Academy of Performing Arts, and in 2023–2025, she participated in an artist residency at the Menashe Dance House, where she created "The Swing" and "Mother Work".

=== Teaching ===
Alongside her artistic career, Vazanna teaches contemporary dance, repertoire, and workshops in various Institutions in Israel and abroad, and has published several articles and studies on the subject of contemporary dance teaching and creative processes in the magazine "Dance Now - Dance Diaries" edited by Ruth Eshel.

== Selected works ==
- 2006 - "Layers" - The work was performed as part of the Kibbutz Dance Company's Creative Dancers and as part of the "Another Dance" festival at Suzanne Dellal Center.
- 2008 - "Erda, A Trio" - The work was performed as part of the Creative Dancers program at the Cullberg Ballet, Sweden.
- 2009 - "Walking inside Water", solo. The work premiered as part of the Creative Dancers program at the Cullberg Ballet. The work was then performed as part of the "Miniatures" festival at the Interdisciplinary theatre - Hazira, in Jerusalem.
- 2010 - "One to Tango", solo. The work premiered as part of the 2010 "Machol Lohet" festival at Suzanne Dellal Center.
- 2012 - "Red Fields", solo. The work premiered as part of the 2012 "Intimadance" festival at the Tmuna Theater. The work was performed in Italy, Germany, and Denmark.
- 2012 - "The Feast", trio. The work premiered at the "Curtain Up" festival. The work was invited to perform in Sweden, Italy, Spain, and Germany.
- 2014 - "HIGH", duet. The work premiered at Jaffa to Agripas Events - C.A.T.A.M.O.N. in Jerusalem. The work was performed in the Netherlands and the Czech Republic in 2022.
- 2014 - "Transparent Borders", duet. The work was performed in Germany, Italy, Switzerland, the United States, and the Netherlands.
- 2015 - "BODIES", quartet - in collaboration with artist Tomer Sapir. The work was performed in Russia in 2017.
- 2017 - "TRACES", septet. Original work for the Delattre Dance Company, Mainz, Germany.
- 2018 - "MONSTER", trio. The work was performed in Russia in 2018.
- 2019 - "Good Children", trio. The work premiered as part of the Curtain Up project. The work was performed in the Czech Republic in 2022.
- 2023 - "The Swing", quartet. Invited to festivals in Croatia and the Czech Republic.
- 2023 - "Body of Peace", duet. Performed throughout Israel and was invited to perform in Australia.
- 2024 - "Human, Common Territory", created and performed at the Hong Kong Academy for Performing Arts.
- 2024 - "Universal Bodies Universal Souls", dance film directed by Maurice Lai. In collaboration with the Hong Kong Academy of Performing Arts.
- 2025 - "Mother Work", trio. The work premiered at the 2025 Curtain Up Project.
