= Barthold Douma van Burmania =

Dutch diplomat (1695–1766)

Barthold Douma van Burmania (bapt. 17 November 1695 in Hallum – 24 March 1766 in Vienna) was a Dutch statesman and ambassador to the court of Vienna in the eighteenth century.

Van Burmania was born in a small village in Friesland as the son of Jeepke van Douma and Sjuck van Burmania, a military man and later a councillor at the Court of Friesland from 1710 to 1721. After a military career, Barthold became an ambassador in Cologne in 1739 and later at the court of Vienna.

He was a man of broad humanitarian sympathies and an especially staunch friend of the Jews. When, in the 1740s, Maria Theresa ordered the expulsion of the Jews from Prague (to take place before the end of January 1745) and from all Bohemia (before the end of June 1745) Burmania, at the request of the Jewish communities of Amsterdam, Rotterdam, and The Hague, encouraged by influential shtadlanim like Wolf Wertheimer and Tobias Boas, exerted all his influence at the court to have the edict revoked. He was assisted by the English minister, Sir Thomas Robinson.

The result of his efforts was the postponement of the date of exile to the last day of February 1745. Again the Jewish communities of Holland appealed to Burmania, and again he pleaded, urged, and remonstrated with the Austrian Reichskanzler (Chancellor), that "sovereigns, more than other persons, are responsible to God and man for their deeds." Another month of grace was granted, but on 31 March 1745 the Jews of Prague were exiled. Thereupon, Burmania, supported by the ambassadors of England, Poland, and Turkey, directed his energies toward averting the expulsion of the Jews from the whole of Bohemia, which was to take place in June.

A royal edict was issued on 8 April 1745, ordering all Jews of Moravia also to emigrate within a short time. Again Burmania pleaded for them, and the edicts were modified on 15 May 1745, the Jews being allowed to remain in Bohemia and Moravia "until further orders". Burmania endeavored to have repealed the edict which was issued on 25 June 1746, prohibiting all Jews from coming within two hours' distance of Prague; but he was not successful. Finally, however, on July 1748, Maria Theresa revoked the edict of 18 December 1744 "on account of the pressure from the foreign ambassadors" and the Jews were allowed to return to Prague.
