= Genezareth, Hallum =

Smock mill in the Netherlands

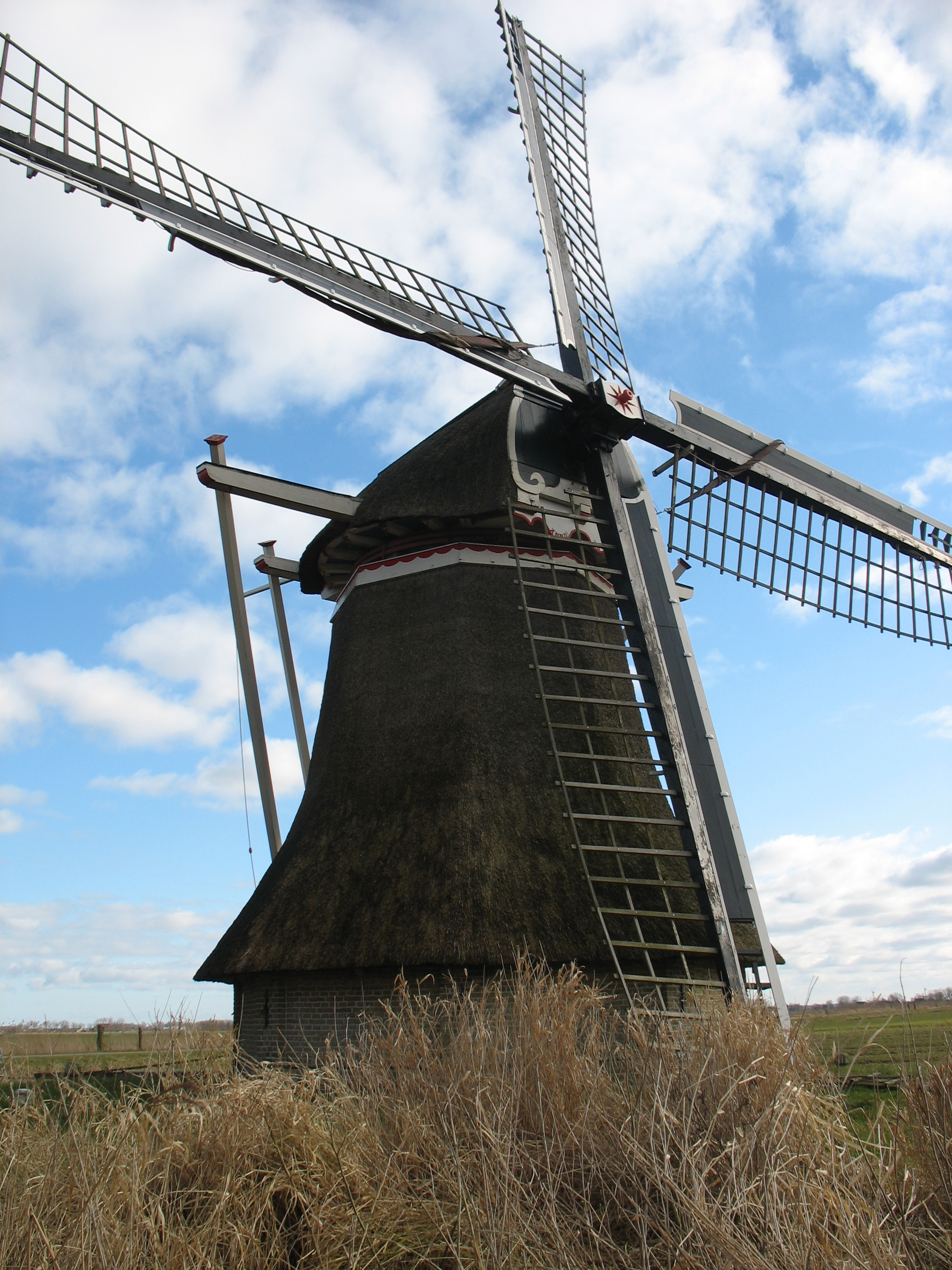
- Genezareth, February 2009

Origin
- Mill name: Genezareth; Kloosterpoldermolen
- Mill location: Trekweg 8, 9074 LE Hallum
- Coordinates: 53°17′07″N 5°49′14″E
- Operator(s): Stichting De Fryske Mole
- Year built: 1850

Information
- Purpose: Drainage mill
- Type: Smock mill
- Storeys: Three-storey smock
- Base storeys: Single-storey base
- Smock sides: Eight sides
- No. of sails: Four sails
- Type of sails: Common sails
- Windshaft: Cast iron
- Winding: Tailpole and winch
- Type of pump: Archimedes' screw

The Genezareth or Kloosterpoldermolen is a smock mill in Hallum, Friesland, Netherlands which was built in 1850 and has been restored to working order. The mill is listed as a Rijksmonument, number 15642.

== History ==
The Genezareth was built in 1850 by millwright H de Vries to drain the Genezareth-Kloosterpolder. Restorations were undertaken in 1958 and 1962. On 4 May 1976, the mill was sold to Stichting De Fryske Mole (English: Frisian Mills Foundation) A further restoration was undertaken in 1980. In 2006, the mill was officially designated as being in reserve should it be required to drain the polder.

== Description ==
The Genezareth is a three-storey smock mill on a single-storey brick base. There is no stage, the sails reaching down almost to the ground. The smock and cap are thatched. The cap is winded by tailpole and winch. The sails are Common sails, they have a span of 15.92 metres (52 ft 3 in). The sails are carried on a cast-iron windshaft, which was cast by H J Koening of Foxham, Groningen in 1900. The windshaft carries the brake wheel, which has 47 cogs. This drives the wallower (25 cogs) at the top of the upright shaft. At the bottom of the upright shaft, a crown wheel with 35 cogs drives a gear with 35 cogs on the axle of the Archimedes' screw. The axle of the Archimedes' screw is 340 millimetres (13¼ in) diameter. The Archimedes' screw is 1.29 metres (4 ft 3 in) diameter and 3.86 metres (12 ft 8 in) long. It is inclined at an angle of 17½°. Each revolution of the Archimedes' screw lifts 600 litres (130 imp gal) of water.

== Public access ==
The Genezareth is open to the public by appointment, or if it is working.
