= Hallum =

- Village
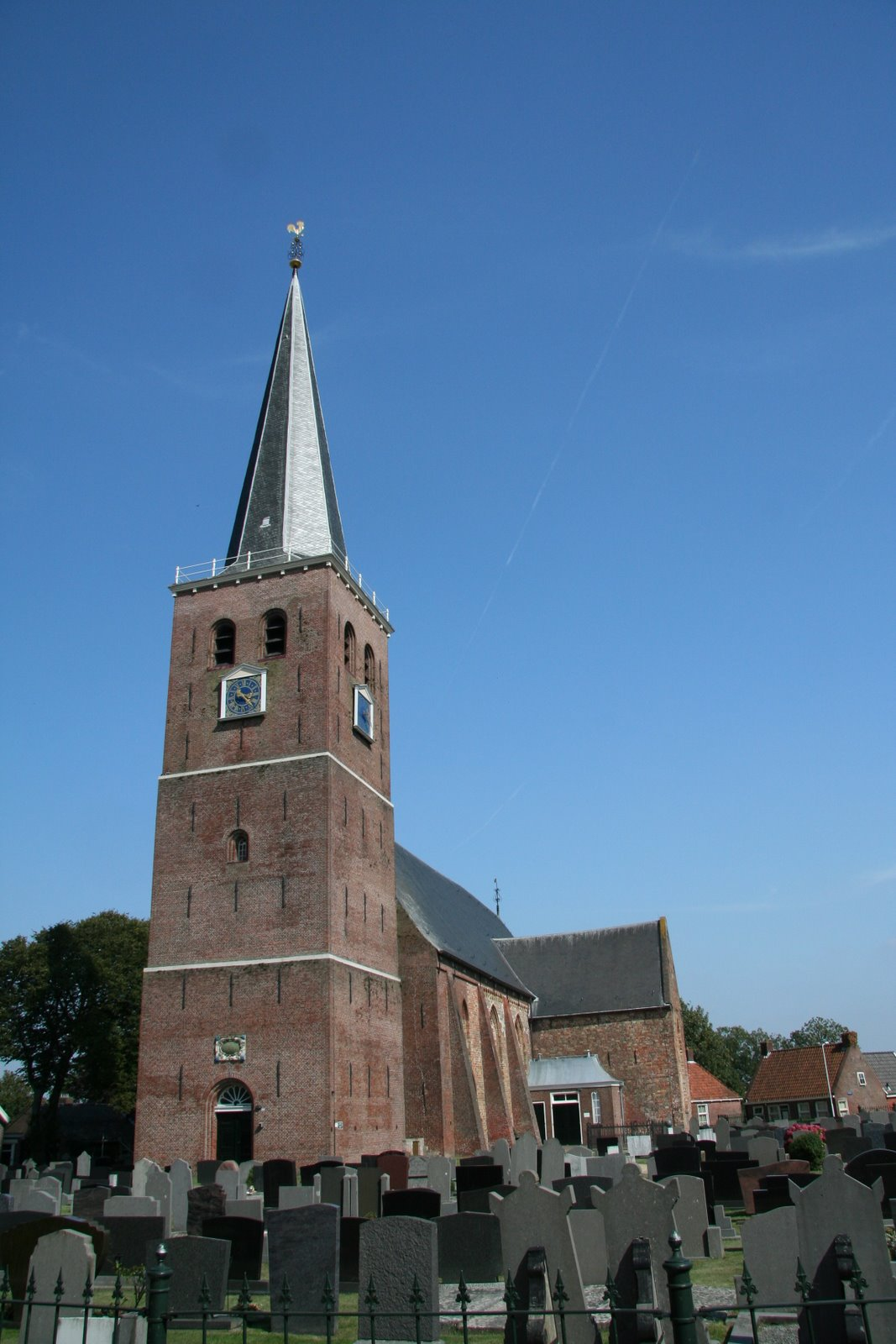
- St Martin's church

- Flag Coat of arms

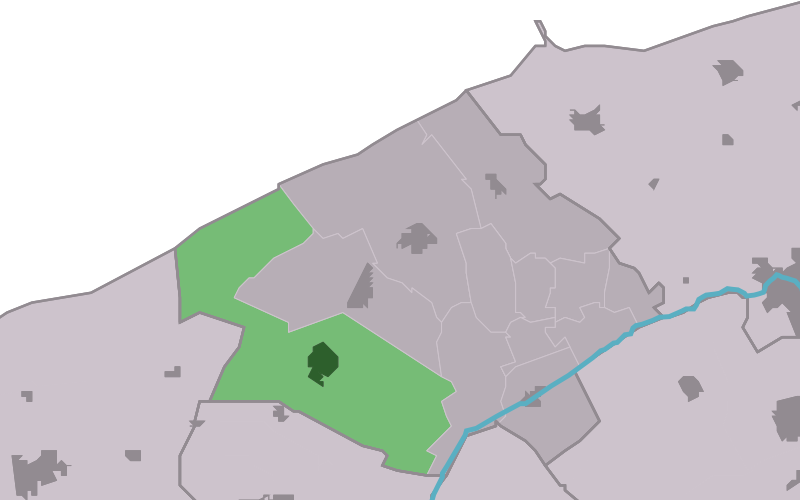
- Location in the former Ferwerderadiel municipality

- Location in the Netherlands Hallum (Netherlands)
- Country: Netherlands
- Province: Friesland
- Municipality: Noardeast-Fryslân

Area
  - Total: 29.38 km^{2} (11.34 sq mi)
- Elevation: 0.6 m (2.0 ft)

Population (2021)
  - Total: 2,685
  - Density: 91.39/km^{2} (236.7/sq mi)
- Time zone: UTC+1 (CET)
  - Summer (DST): UTC+2 (CEST)
- Postal code: 9074
- Dialing code: 0518

Hallum is a village in the province of Friesland, the Netherlands. It is a village in the municipality of Noardeast-Fryslân and it had a population of around 2,746 in January 2017. The primary language spoken is West Frisian. Before 2019, the village was part of the Ferwerderadiel municipality. The monastery Mariëngaarde was located in Hallum between 1163 and 1578.

== History ==
The village was first mentioned in the 13th century as Hallem. The etymology is unclear. Hallum is a terp (artificial living mound) village with a radial structure which developed several centuries Before Christ. During the 11th or 12th century, a dike was built linking the village to Stiens and Marrum.

The former Premonstratensian monastery Mariëngaarde (Hortus sanctae Mariae) was located about 1 km to the west of Hallum. It was founded in 1163 by Frederik van Hallum. Later a nunnery was built in Bartlehiem as an outpost. In 1578, it was destroyed during the Reformation and in 1580, all possessions were seized by the States of Friesland.

The Dutch Reformed church has elements from the 12th century. The medieval tower collapsed in 1804 and was rebuilt between 1805 and 1806. Offinga State was a castle along the coast of the Middelzee and probably dated from the 11th century. In 1566, the van Aebingas swore loyalty to Philip II of Spain and were appointed grietman (mayor and judge) of Menaldumadeel, but lost possession of the island of Ameland to the Camminghas. In 1598, during the Dutch Revolt, the estate was plundered and Schelte van Aebinga was briefly imprisoned. In 1738, the estate was demolished.

In 1840, Hallum was home to 1,178 people. There used to be a station on the North Friesland Railway which opened in 1901 and closed in December 1940.

A restored windmill used to be located near the village. In 2000 it was moved to Burgwerd due to expanding industry and renamed "Aylvapoldermolen".

== Notable people ==
- Jurjen Bosch (born 1985), professional football player
- Barthold Douma van Burmania (1695-1766), statesman and ambassador to the court of Vienna
- Marijke Groenewoud (born 1999), long-distance long-track speed skater and inline speed skater
- Frederik van Hallum (c. 1125–1175), priest and regular canon, founder of Mariëngaarde
- Maria Sterk (born 1979), marathon speed skater
- Douwe de Vries (born 1982), former professional marathon speed skater and long track speed skater

== Gallery ==
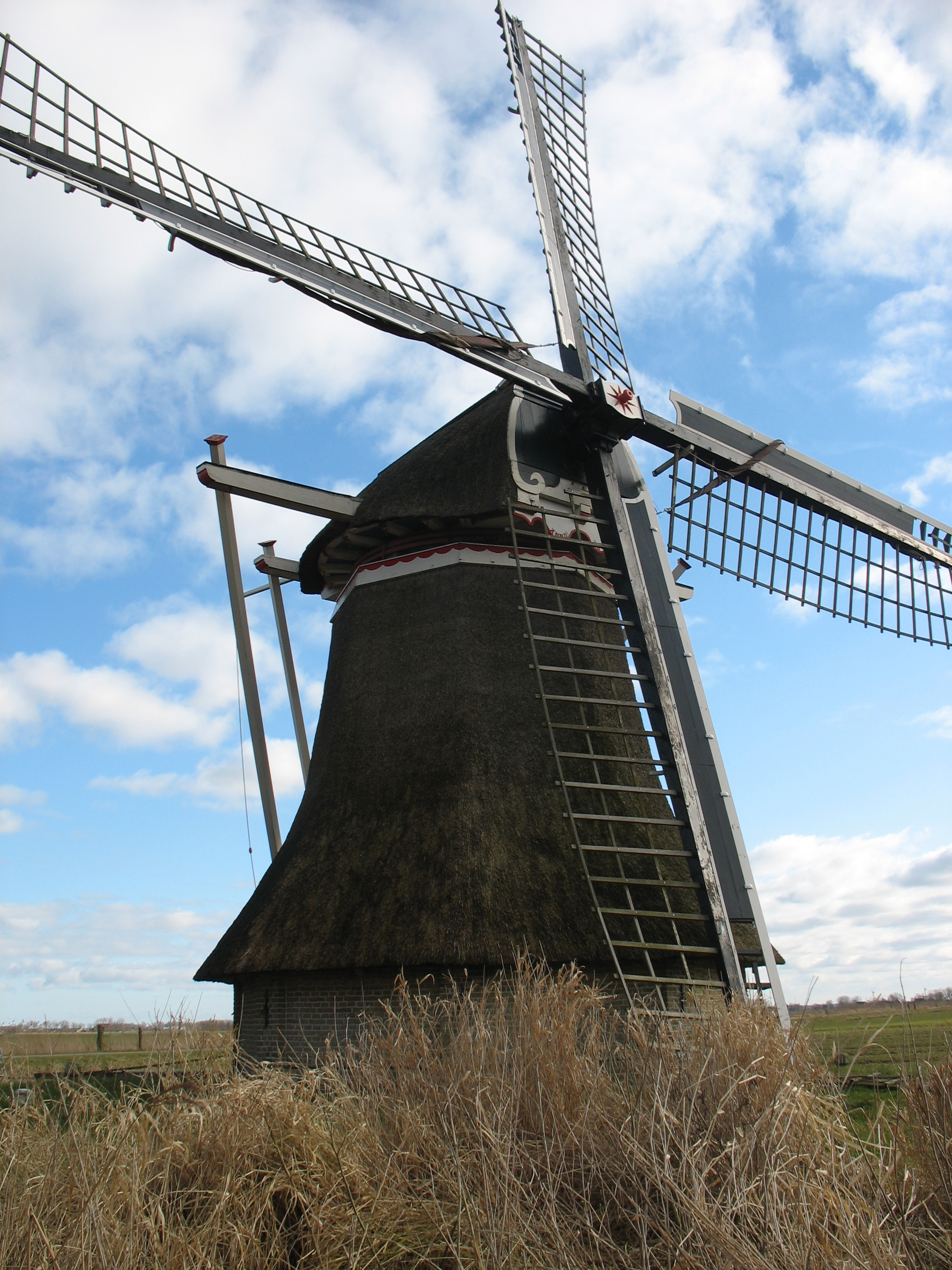
Windmill Genezareth

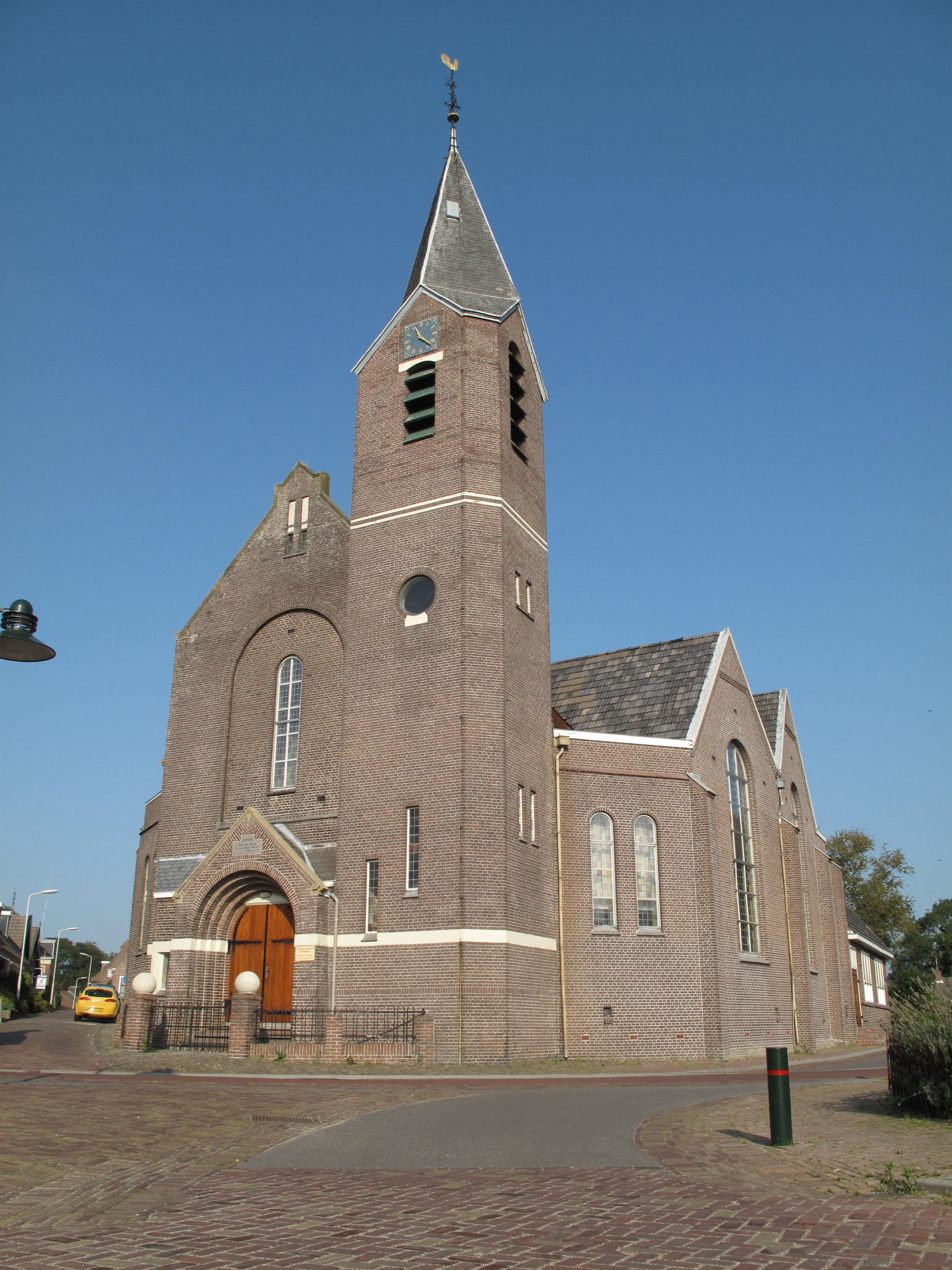
De Hoeksteen

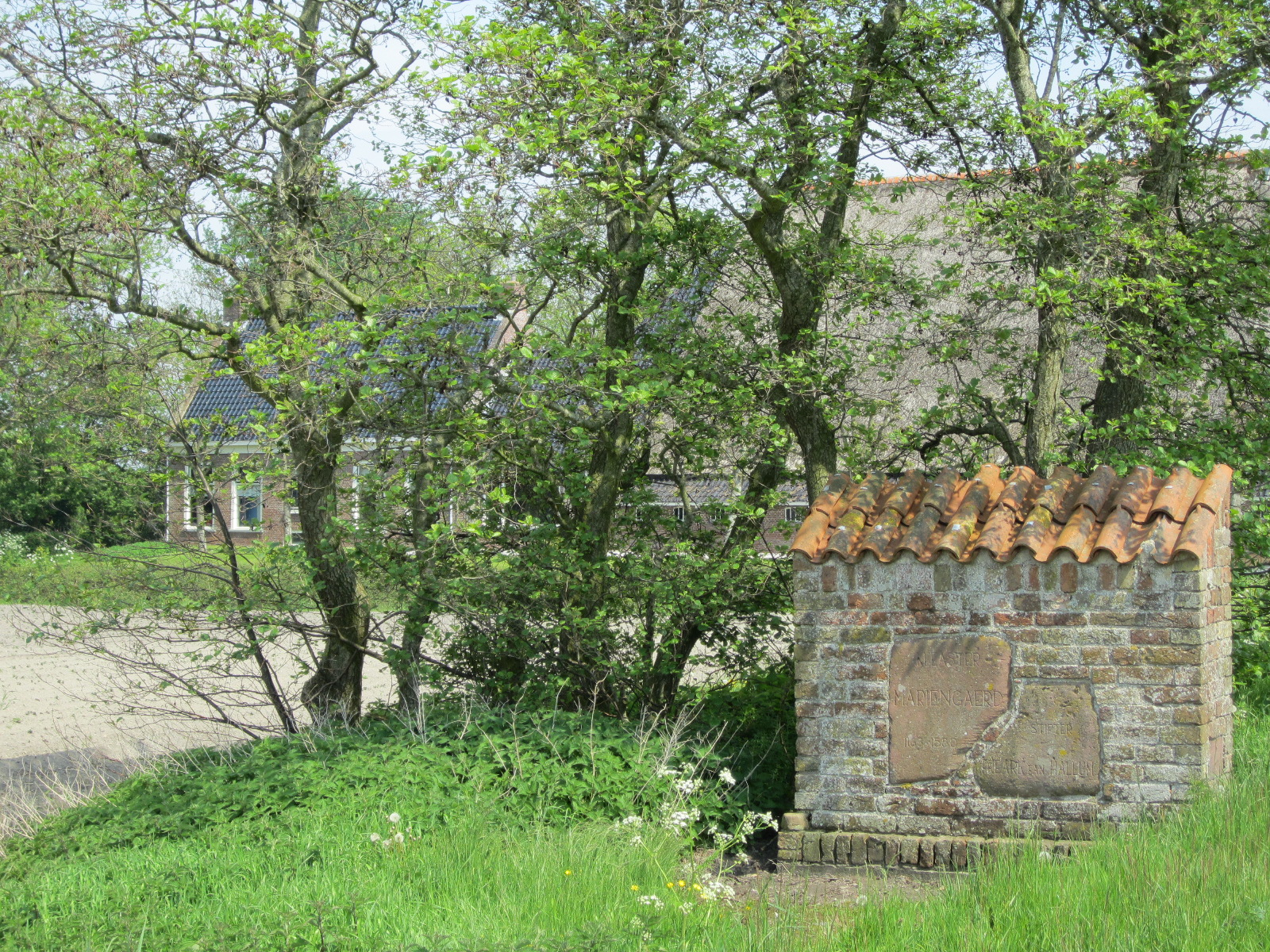
Remains of the monastery Mariëngaarde

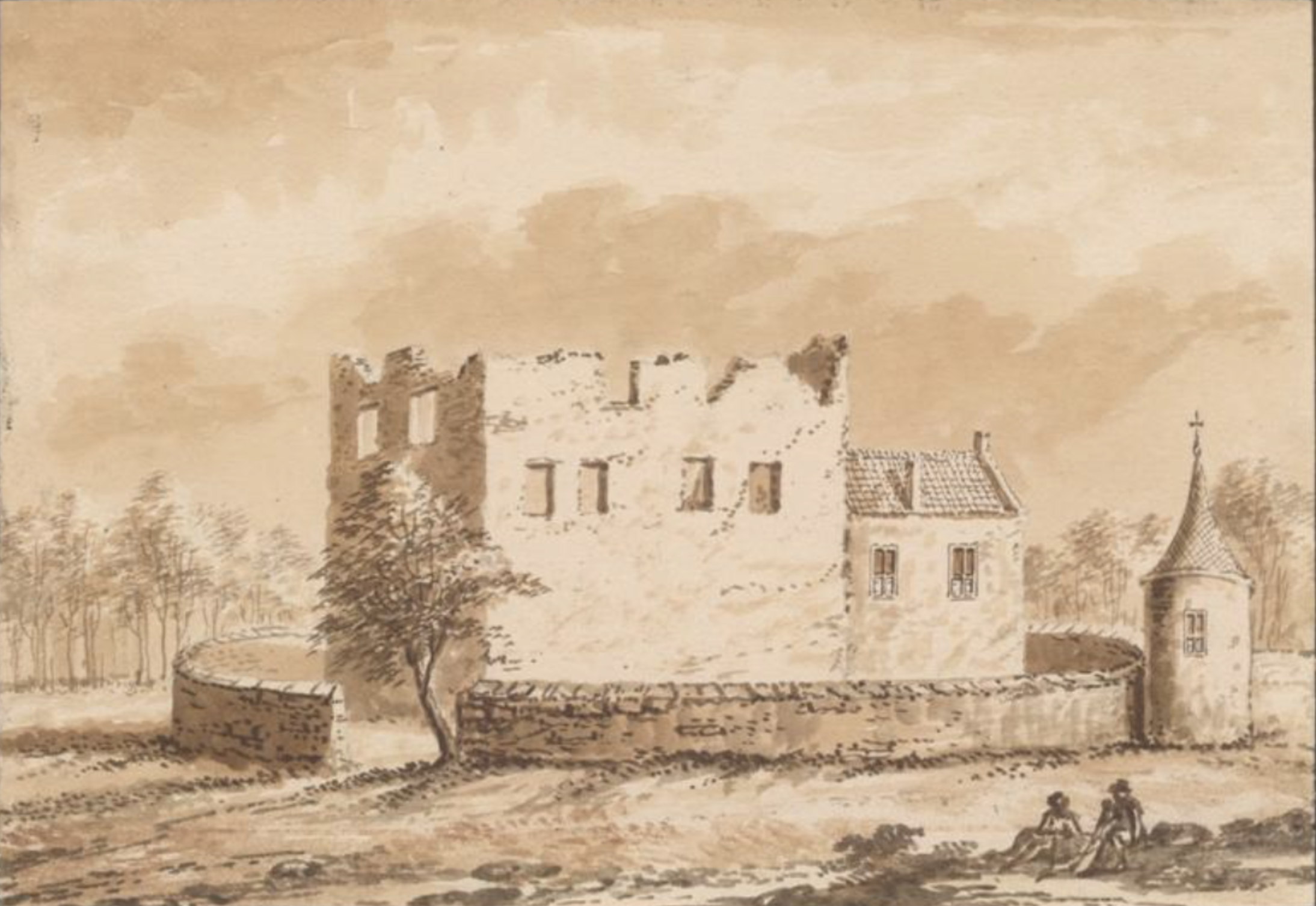
Drawing of the ruins of Mariëngaarde (c. 1725)
