= Foppe van Aitzema =

Dutch diplomat

Foppe van Aitzema (c. 1580 – October 1637) was council to the Duke of Brunswick when he became resident to the state of the United Netherlands in Hamburg.

Aitzema was born in Dokkum to Schelte van Aitzema, a man of noble birth.

== Mission to Wallenstein ==
In 1630, he was sent by the States-General of the Netherlands to Wallenstein and the Count of Tilly to sign a treaty of mutual neutrality. Even though Wallenstein had been for a long time partial to the idea of friendship with the States, he now declared that he couldn't dismiss the army he had raised. The negotiations with Tilly also were fruitless.

== Sent to Denmark ==
The same year, Aitzema was sent to Denmark to persuade the King to abolish the new toll he raised in Glückstadt, which weighed especially on the Hamburgers; but this mission also was without success.

== Sent to Vienna ==
=== Goal of neutrality ===
In 1636, he traveled without clear goal but at the behest of his masters to Vienna to persuade the Emperor to keep a strict neutrality, which the States wanted to pledge from their side as well. The Queen of Bohemia also had ordered Aitzema to look after her interests in the Empire. He also had to investigate, at the request of Frederick Henry, Prince of Orange, whether the Emperor was willing to offer the County of Moers to that prince, and whether he would be granted the right to bequest his properties in the Empire by his final will to both his female as his male heirs. At first, Aitzema seemed to succeed. Neutrality was promised easily. There was also some talk of raising Moers to a principality, which much honoured the prince, even though some people in the United Netherlands felt that he should not have accepted honours from the House of Austria.

=== Plans thwarted ===
But the Spaniards at the Imperial Court succeeded in thwarting those plans. The French Envoy Hercule de Charnacé also wasn't pleased by the Emperor's actions. Some claim that Aitzema's travel had another aim as well besides polling the court of Vienna; whatever may be, during his stay at the Imperial Court, because of the services done by his masters to the Empire, he was made a freiherr of the Empire. This trip and the honours bestowed severely grieved France, even more so because the States had promised at the last treaty to break with Austria.

== Recalled ==
The States used this to recall Aitzema in 1637, pretending that he needed to defend himself against the accusations raised; but the true reason was to inform the States about the situation at the court. To keep up the appearance of an inquiry, commissaries were appointed to interrogate him. They reported that the negative rumours were spread by a certain Menzelius, Imperial Commissary in Hamburg. The States decided to accept the defense of Aitzema, and to urge him to faithfully remain at his station. He was then sent to the Lower Saxon Circle to urge the members of this kreis to unanimity. The States also used him to get a secret understanding with the Emperor, to reach a separate treaty with Spain; some of them even wanted to position him at the court permanently.

== Mission to Sweden ==
That same summer, he was sent with a secret mission to the Lord High Chancellor of Sweden Axel Oxenstierna, who resided in Magdeburg. He then fell into disfavor, maybe because he wanted to do more than his duty, maybe because his capabilities created too many enemies, and had to wrestle with the hatred of all since then. The emissionaries of Spain and France fanned the flames in Vienna. The one of Sweden broke his pledge. The French, following all actions of the Swedes, accused him of doing more for the Emperor than for the States. The Prince of Orange, who had, according to some, discussed his own business publicly too soon, considered him the cause of the knowledge of his secrets, and tried to blame the evil of it on him.

== Issue of Ameland ==
Aitzema, together with Simon van Beaumont and Anthony Oetgens van Waveren, had received the island Ameland as his fief; this cast the suspicion of bribery and caused disrepute for him among the common people. This was brought to his attention by some letters he received in Hamburg: he replied on 26 March 1637 in a letter to the States, writing that he had discovered that some bad rumours about him were being spread, that he had started travelling 19 March to make an oral report, that he had heard, when he was in Oldenburg, that he was said to deserve the death penalty on twenty or thirty accounts, that the least punishment he could expect was being quartered; for which reasons he asked for a right of passage and some delay. The oft discussed case of Ameland was investigated and nothing found that contradicted the honesty of a faithful citizen. The States sent a letter to Hamburg, urging Aitzema to return forthwith to Holland; if he wouldn't comply, the Commissaries were ordered to request the government of Hamburg to arrest Aitzema and to deliver him and his papers to their highnesses.

== Flight to Prague ==
Aitzema, upon hearing this, fled to Prague, where people also were opposed to him because of his efforts for the neutrality. Because all kings were now against him, he was nowhere safe. The States of Frisia were especially bitter, and authorised the court of justice to start a case against him; however, because no specific complaint was filed, nothing came of this. Aitzema, now wandering, fled from Prague to Vienna, where he died in 1637 after having converted to Roman Catholicism. He was buried in the church of the Dominicans. His numerous capacities, which he often used, were most probably the cause of the resentment people felt towards him. In his youth, he was highly regarded by Hugo de Groot and Cornelis van der Myle, who wrote a letter of recommendation to Daniel Heinsius, who was in Paris in 1617. Pieter Corneliszoon Hooft called him an overqualified man in one of his letters. In 1607, in Helmstad, he had published a few Latin poems and some writings concerning Civilian Law.
