= Lieuwe van Aitzema =

Dutch historian (1600–1669)

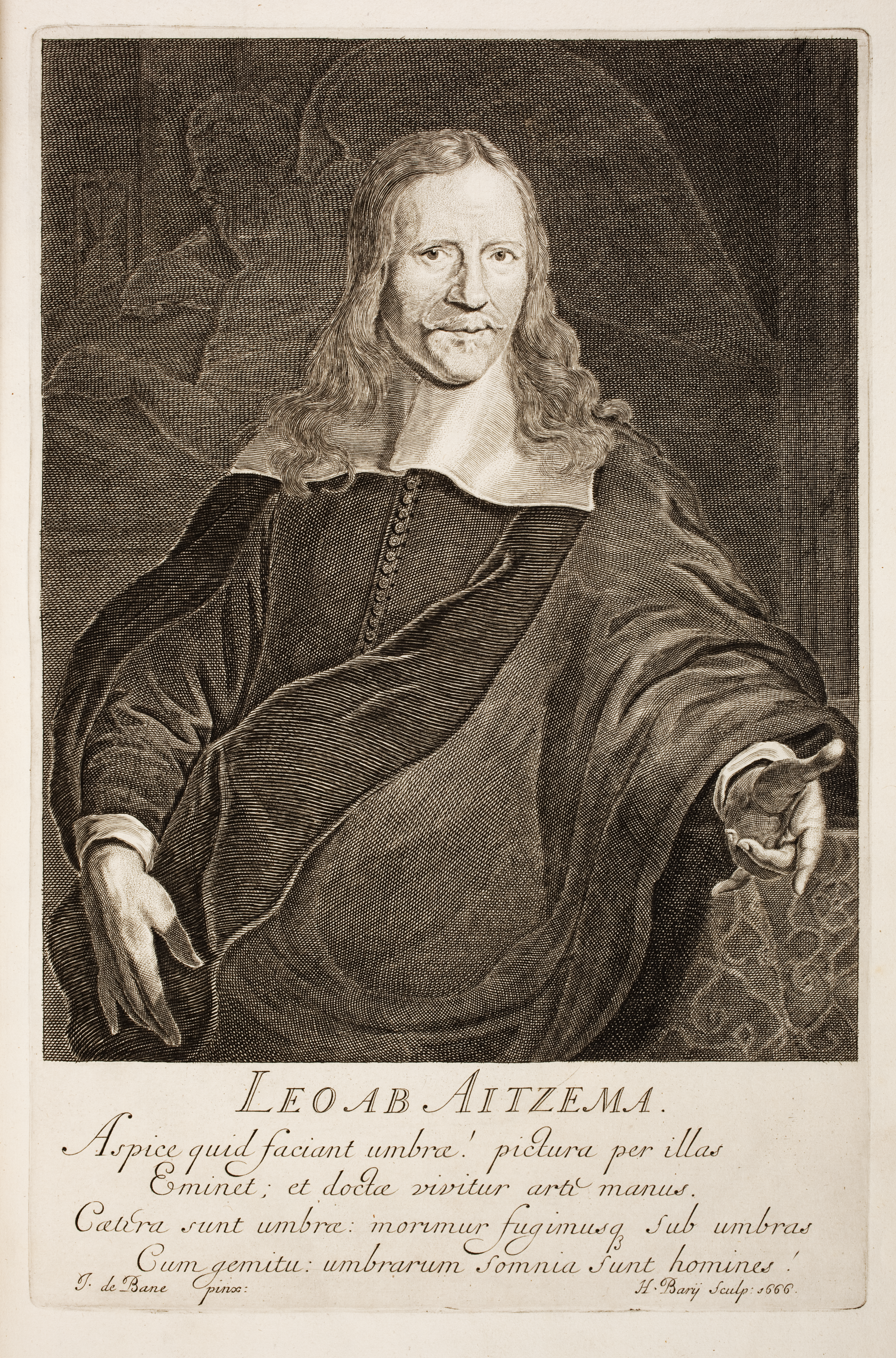
Lieuwe van Aitzema, by Jan de Baen and Hendrik Bary.

Lieuwe (Leo) van Aitzema (19 November 1600 – 23 February 1669) was a Dutch historian, diplomat, bon viveur, libertine and spy.

He was born at Dokkum, in Friesland. In 1617 he published a volume of Latin poems under the title of Poemata Juvenilia, of which a copy is preserved in the British Museum. He made a special study of politics and political science and was for thirty years resident and minister for the Hanseatic towns at the Hague, where he died on 23 February 1669.

His most important work was the Saken van Staet in Oorlogh in ende omtrent de Vereenigte Nederlanden (14 vols. 4to, 1655–1671), embracing the period from 1621 to 1668. It contains a large number of state documents, and is an invaluable authority on one of the most eventful periods of Dutch history.

Four continuations of the history, by the poet and historian Lambert van den Bos, were published successively at Amsterdam in 1685, 1688, 1698 and 1699. The Derde Vervolg Zijnde het vierde Stuck van het vervolgh op de historie, &c. brings the history down to 1697.
