= Jurjen Bosch =

Dutch footballer

Personal information
- Full name: Jurjen Bosch
- Date of birth: 14 December 1985 (age 40)
- Place of birth: Hallum, Netherlands
- Position: Forward

Team information
- Current team: Wykels Hallum

Senior career*
| Years | Team | Apps | (Gls) |
| 2007–2009 | Cambuur | 7 | (0) |
| 2010–2011 | PKC'83 | | |
| 2011–2015 | ONS Boso Sneek | | |
- * Club domestic league appearances and goals

Jurjen Bosch (born 14 December 1985) is a Dutch retired professional football player who played as a forward for Dutch club SC Cambuur.

== Club career ==
In his younger years, he played for local soccer club Wykels Hallum.

Bosch made his professional debut for Cambuur on 21 December 2007 in an Eerste Divisie match against Go Ahead Eagles. He was released by the club in 2009.

He returned to amateur football after two seasons with Cambuur and played for Hoofdklasse club PKC'83 and Topklasse side ONS Boso Sneek. In summer 2015 he joined childhood club Wykels Hallum.
