= Idan Cohen (choreographer) =

Israeli choreographer and opera director

Idan Cohen (Hebrew: עידן כהן; born June 6, 1978) is an Israeli choreographer and opera director. He was born in Kibbutz Mizra, Israel

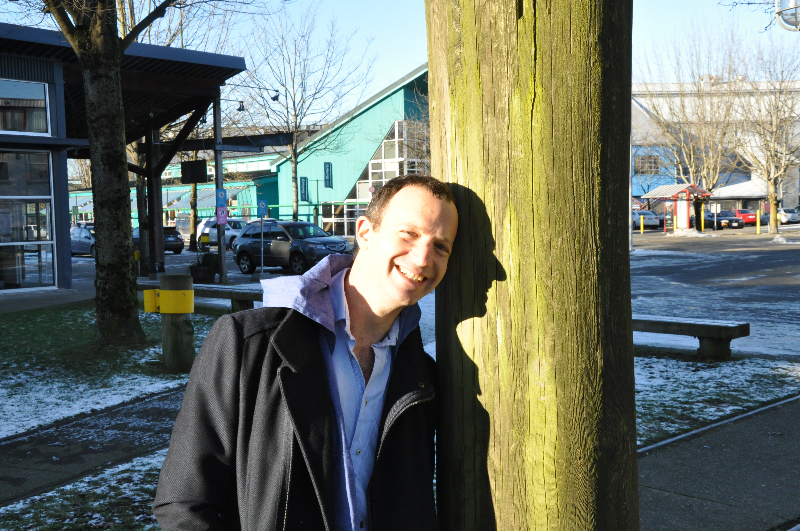
Idan Cohen: An Israeli Choreographer and Opera Director

== Biography ==
Cohen was trained as a classical piano player, and graduated from his studies at the Art Colony, in southern Israel (the Negev) where he studied theater and fine arts. Cohen holds a BA (2015) and an MFA (2017) in choreography from the Jerusalem Academy of Music and Dance.

In 1998, Cohen joined the KCDC (founded by Yehudit Arnon, artistic director Rami Be’er), where he danced for 7 seasons. Since 2005, Cohen has been creating, performing and teaching as a choreographer and opera director.

In 2017 Cohen opened 'Ne. Sans Opera & Dance' in Vancouver, Canada. Ne. Sans is a home for the research and creation of work that seeks to deepen and re-connect Opera and Dance.

== Awards ==
- “Orfeo”, First Prize, Be'er Sheva Dance Prize 2017, IL.
- 2012 Rozenbloom award, Tel Aviv Municipality, IL.
- Young Artist Award- 2012 Ministry of Culture, IL.
- Young artist Award- 2010 Ministry of Culture, IL.
- Young artist Award- 2008 Ministry of Culture, IL.
- "My Sweet little fur" First Performing Prize at the " Solo Tanz Theater Festival", Stuttgart, Germany March 2008
- "My sweet little fur" Video Dance by Ofek Wertman -first prize in "KinoLewchyk" Experimental Video Festival, Kyiv, Ukraine- April 2008
- ·First prize and the Encouraging Award for Original Interpretation of Musical Composition in the Margarita Arnaudova International Modern Dance Competition, Sofia, Bulgaria - November 2007
- Israeli Artists' Association and Bank HaPoalim, "Ehud Manor price" – June 2007.
- Second prize at "No Ballet" competition, "A year in a Fish Life" -Ludwigshafen, Germany March 2007.

== Works ==
Orfeo: Games of Love and Death (2019); Trionfi Amore (2019); Benvenuto (2018); Orfeo (2016); I Cauleti e i Montecchi (2016); Nesting (2015) created for the Kraków Dance Theater, Poland; Si, Fuggire (2015); Coppélia (2014); 'who made them' (2014) A dance installation in collaboration with the Jewish-British artist Jacqueline Nichols; Private Dancer (2014), created for T.H.E 2 Dance Company, Singapore; Gender Bender (2013); Nesting (2013), a site specific installation in collaboration with the Art, Dance & Visual Art Departments of Amherst College, Massachusetts, USA; Private Dancer (2014), created for T.H.E 2 dance company, Singapore; Song of a Wayfarer (2012); Mad Siren (2011); Brazil (2010) in collaboration with the Maria Kong Dance Company; Because (2010), created for the Silesian Dance Company in Bytom, Poland; Swan Lake (2009), supported by Tanzplan, Dresden, Germany; Joy Ride (2008); My Sweet Little Fur (2007); Half Cup Sesame Seeds (2007); A Year in a Fish Life (2006).
