= Dokkum =

- City
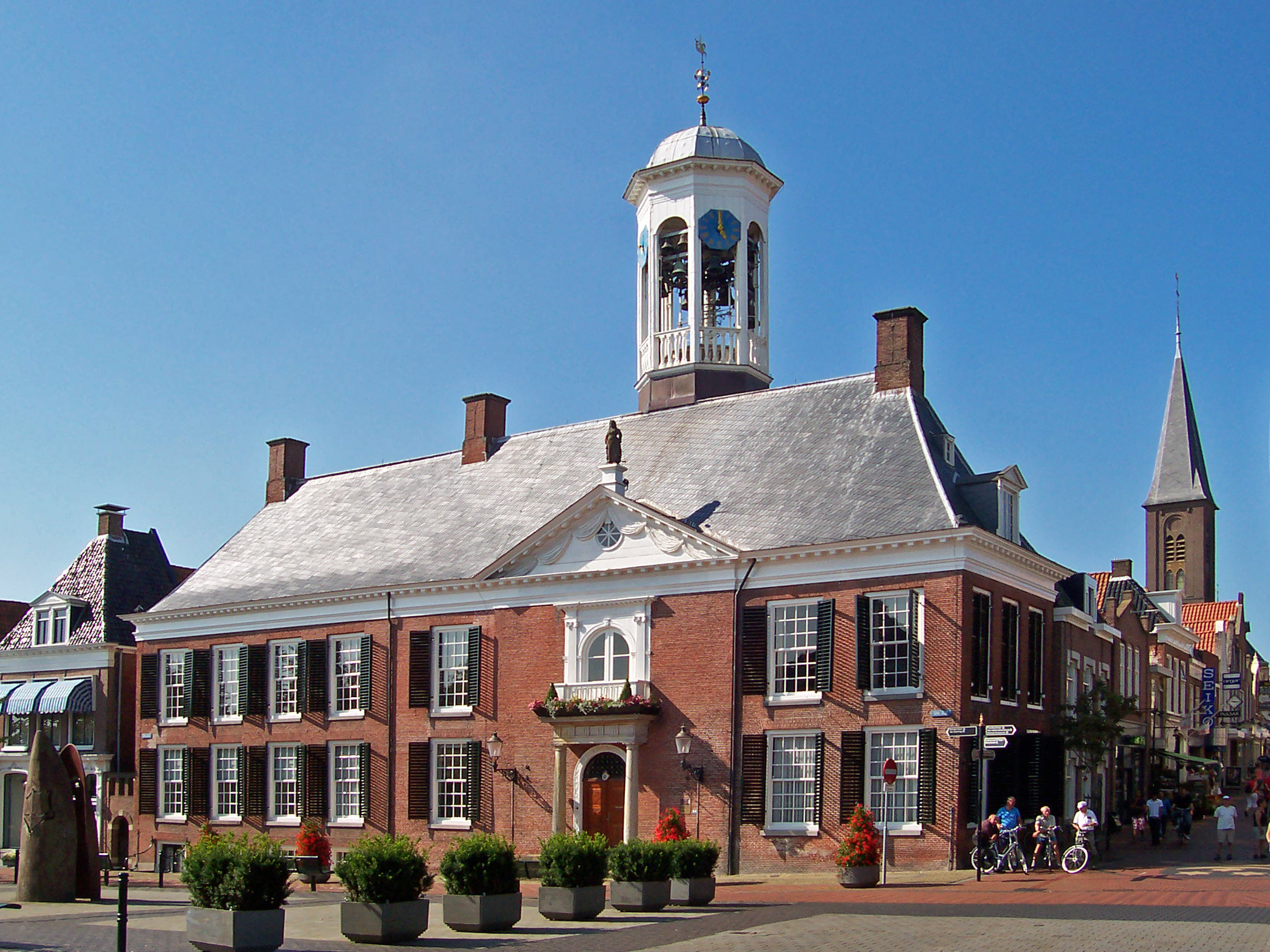
- Stadhuis, the city hall

- Flag Coat of arms

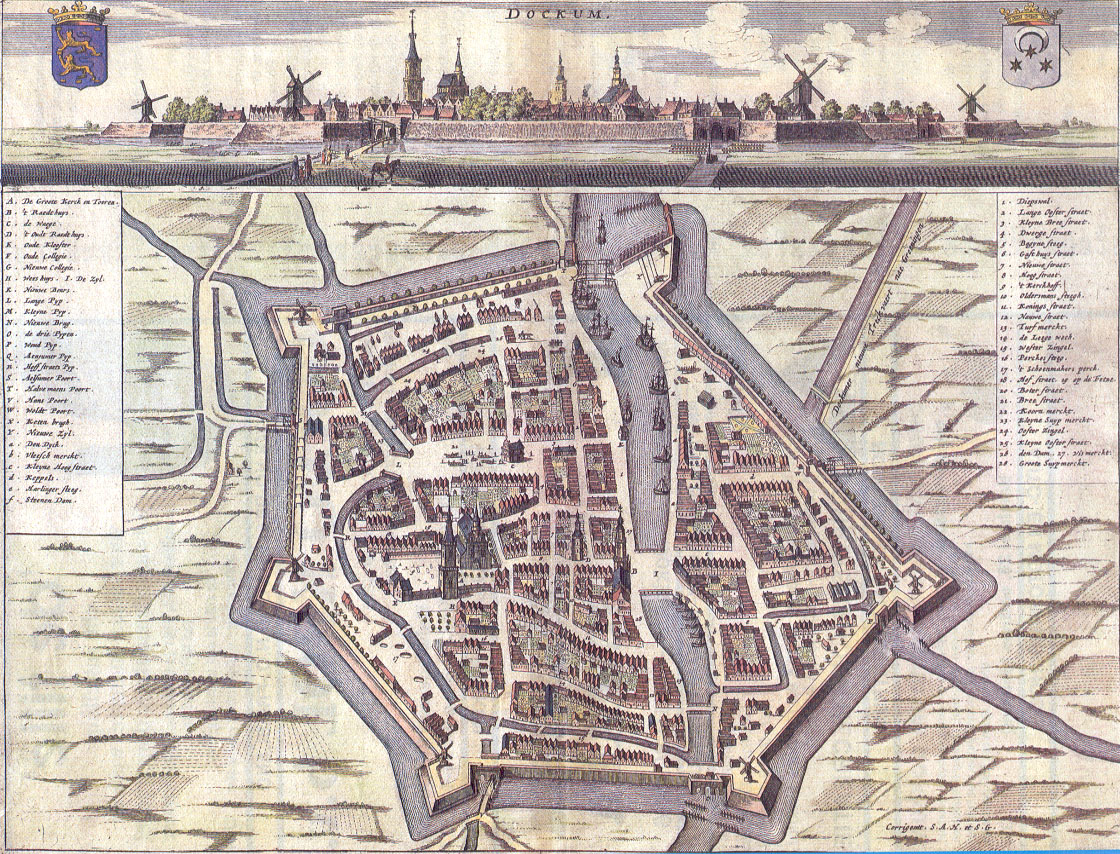

- Location within Friesland
- Coordinates: 53°19′37″N 5°59′53″E
- Country: Netherlands
- Province: Friesland
- Municipality: Noardeast-Fryslân

Government
  - Mayor: Johannes Kramer (FNP)

Population
  - Total: 12,669
- Time zone: UTC+1 (CET)
  - Summer (DST): UTC+2 (CEST)
- Postcode: 9100–9103
- Area code: 0519

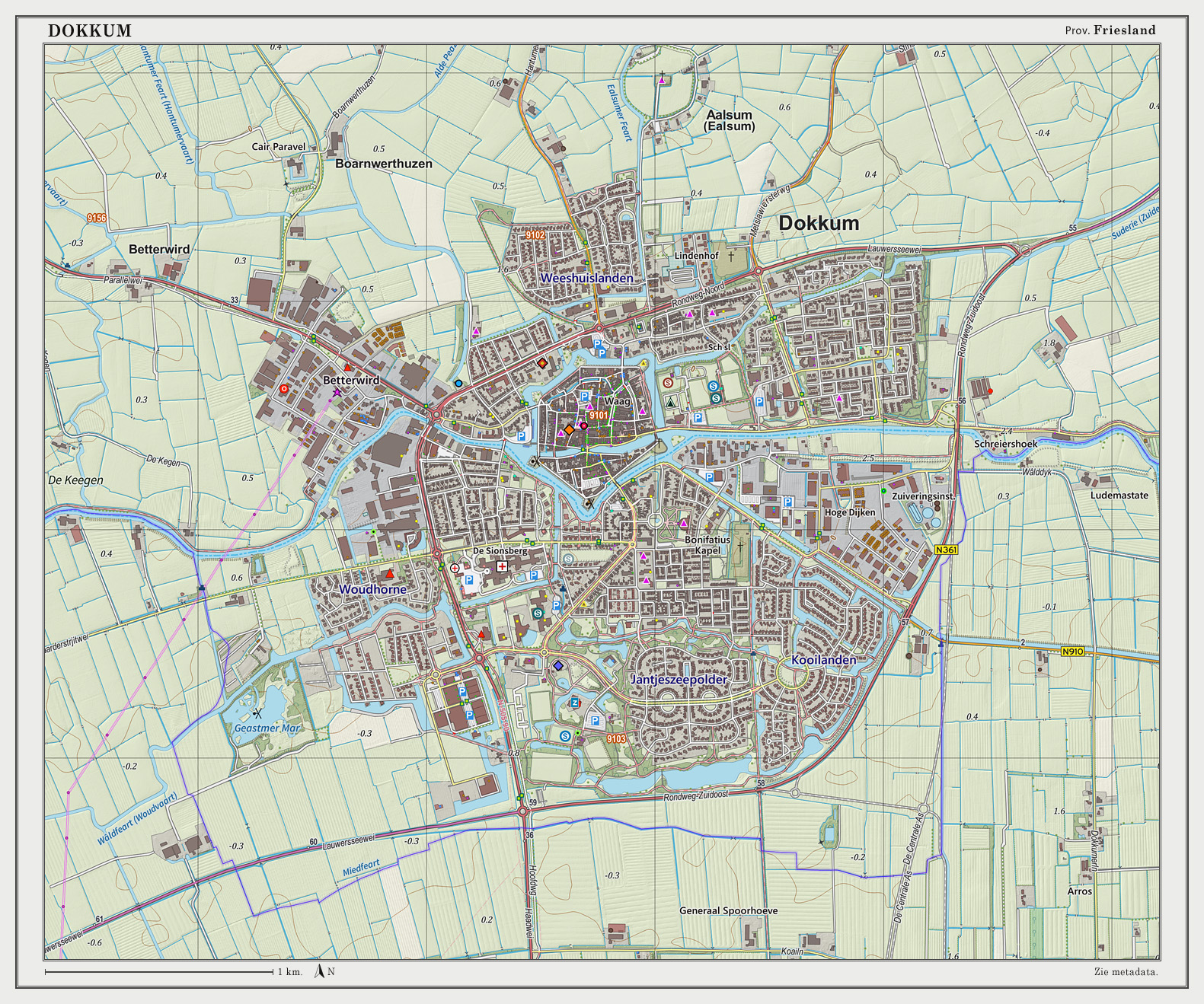
Topographic map of Dokkum, June 2014

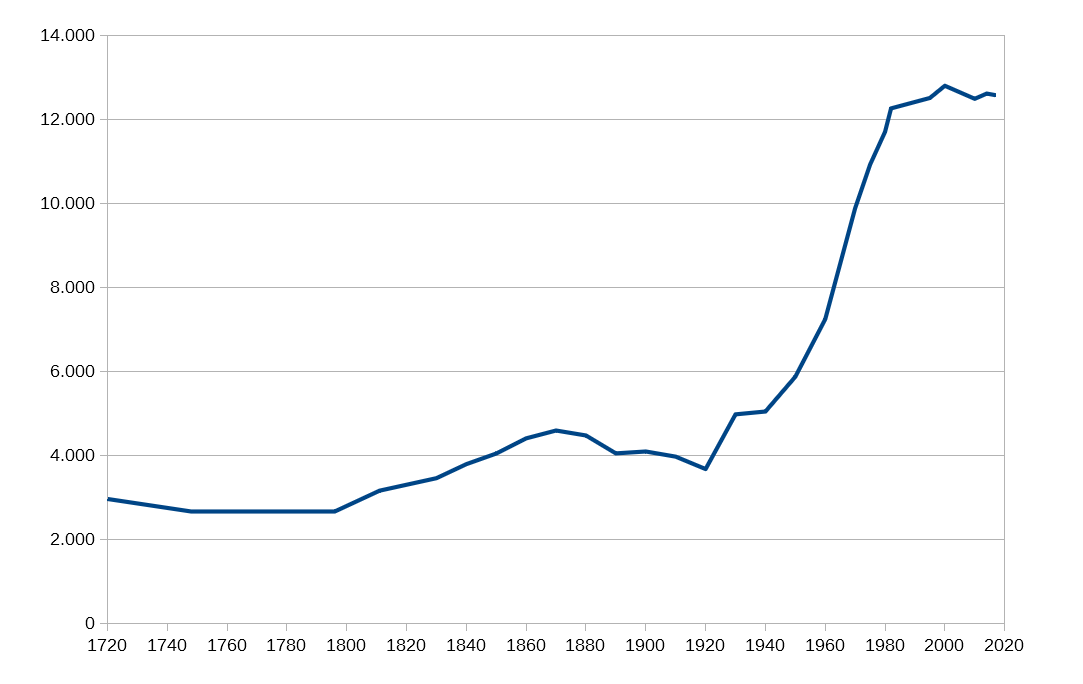
Historical population 1718–2018

Dokkum (Dutch pronunciation: [ˈdɔ.kʏm]) is a Dutch fortified city in the municipality of Noardeast-Fryslân in the province of Friesland. It has 13,046 inhabitants (January 1, 2026). The fortifications of Dokkum are well preserved and are known as the bolwerken (bulwarks). It is the fifth most popular shopping city in Friesland. It also had the smallest hospital in the Netherlands.

== History ==
The best-known event in Dokkum's history is the martyrdom of the Anglo-Saxon missionary Saint Boniface in 754. Oliver of Cologne preached the Fifth Crusade in Dokkum in 1214 and Dokkum sent a contingent; the crescent in the coat of arms of Dokkum refers to this event. Dokkum acquired city rights in 1298. In 1572 Dokkum was sacked by the Spaniards after it had joined the Dutch Revolt. In 1597, the Admiralty of Friesland was established in Dokkum. However, it was moved to Harlingen in 1645. In 1971 the city was included in the list of Dutch 'Urban and village conservation areas'.

In 1923, when Catholics in the Netherlands were not allowed to engage in public expressions of faith such as processions, a processional park was built south-east of the city center, the Boniface park. Central in the park is the so-called Brouwersbron, the brewers' well, which Titus Brandsma and others (incorrectly) identified as the well that sprang up after the saint's martyrdom. A chapel dedicated to Boniface was built in 1934. Brandsma, a Carmelite priest who was murdered by the Nazis in Dachau in 1942, also designed the park's Stations of the Cross, which were finished in 1949.

Before 2019, the city was part of the Dongeradeel municipality.

== Architecture ==
=== City hall ===
The city hall in Dokkum was built in 1610.

=== Churches ===
- Grote of Sint-Martinuskerk which is from the 16th century.
- Sint-Bonifatiuskerk from 1871.
- Bonifatiuskapel is from 1934

== Transport ==
Dokkum had a station (Dokkum-Aalsum) on the North Friesland Railway, which opened in 1901. It became the terminus for passenger services in May 1935 and closed to passengers in July 1936. The station reopened to passengers in May 1940 and closed to passengers in July 1942. Freight services ceased in 1975. There is still a bus station in Dokkum.

== Urban development ==
The latest neighbourhood is called the 'Trije Terpen'. At the Trije Terpen is also the newest shopping area of Dokkum called, Zuiderschans. Other construction works in other parts of the city are also taking place, such as the Lyceumpark, the Fonteinslanden, the Veiling and the Hogedijken.

In the future the industrial park, Betterwird, will expand even more to the west. It's an industrial park with more than 70 companies. In 2013, the construction of the Central Axis began. This is a road with a fast connection and few obstacles between Dokkum and Drachten. The road was delivered in 2016.

=== Population ===
The population of Dokkum increased by 5,378 people between 1960 and 2013. In recent years, the population has fluctuated around 12,500 inhabitants.

Population
| Year | Pop. | ±% p.a. |
|---|---|---|
| 1511 | 1,400 | — |
| 1689 | 3,177 | +0.46% |
| 1744 | 2,855 | −0.19% |
| 1795 | 2,682 | −0.12% |
| 1960 | 7,247 | +0.60% |
| 1965 | 8,440 | +3.09% |
| 1970 | 9,886 | +3.21% |
| 1975 | 10,927 | +2.02% |
| 1980 | 11,704 | +1.38% |
| 1995 | 12,510 | +0.44% |
| 2000 | 12,800 | +0.46% |
| 2010 | 12,490 | −0.24% |
| 2014 | 12,615 | +0.25% |
| 2015 | 12,583 | −0.25% |
| 2016 | 12,516 | −0.53% |
| 2017 | 12,575 | +0.47% |
Source: Lourens & Lucassen 1997, pp. 11–12 (1511–1795), CBS Statline

== Sport ==
In the 200 km ice skating marathon known as the Elfstedentocht, Dokkum is known as the keerpunt (turning-point in Dutch), because it is where the speedskaters turn and head back to Leeuwarden. There are two different soccer clubs in Dokkum, VV Dokkum and Be Quick Dokkum.

== Windmills ==
In 1652, Dokkum had five windmills, these were all post mills. Dokkum has two windmills, cap mills, that are preserved and both of them are open to the public by appointment. They are named Zeldenrust and De Hoop. A third mill, De Marmeerin stood by the Woudvaart outside the town. Since 2014 the mill was moved to be restored to working order. After restoration it is to be rebuilt at De sûkerei open-air museum in Damwâld.

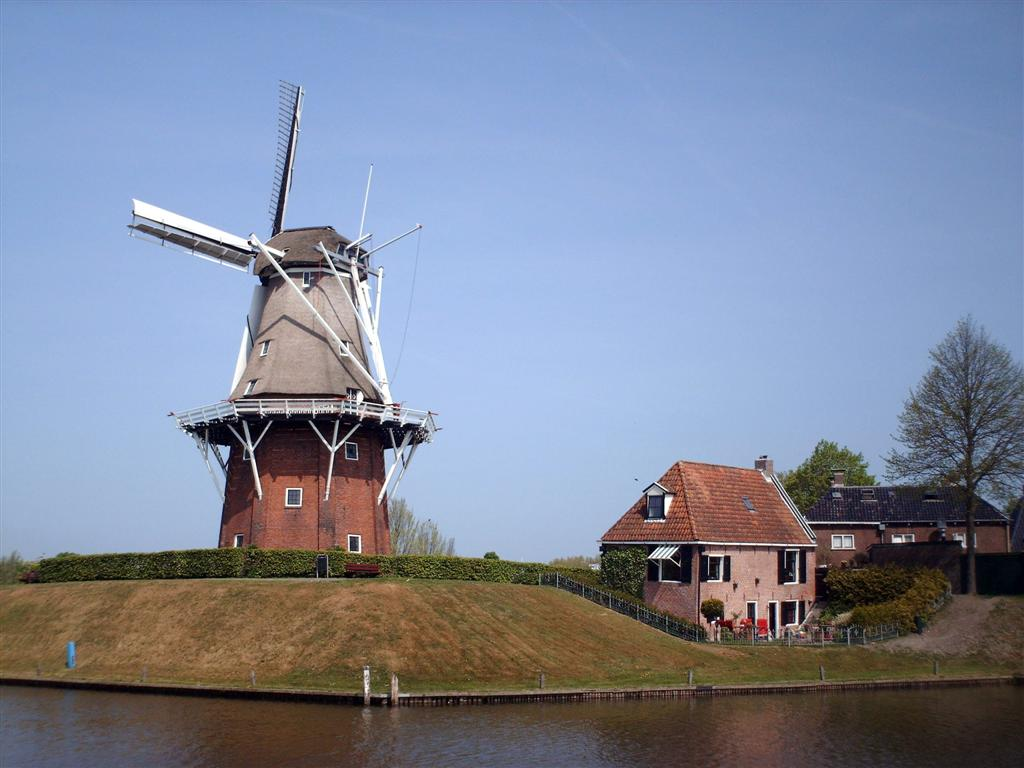
Zeldenrust

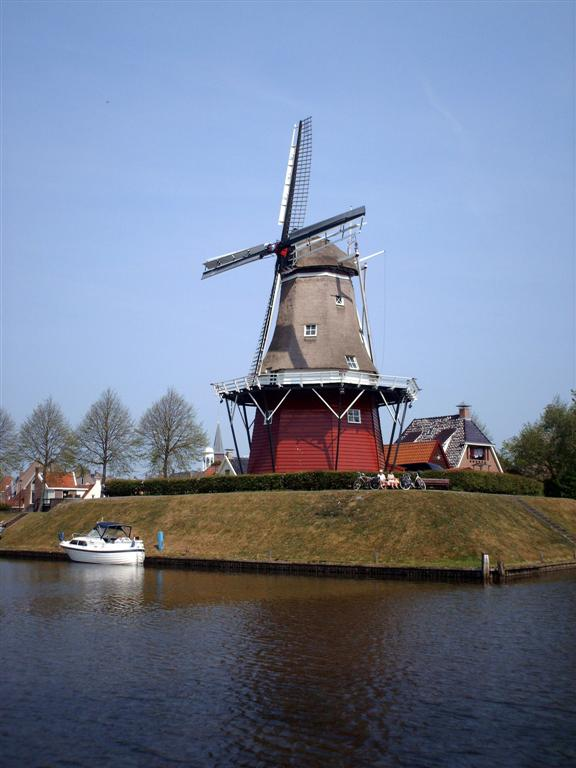
De Hoop

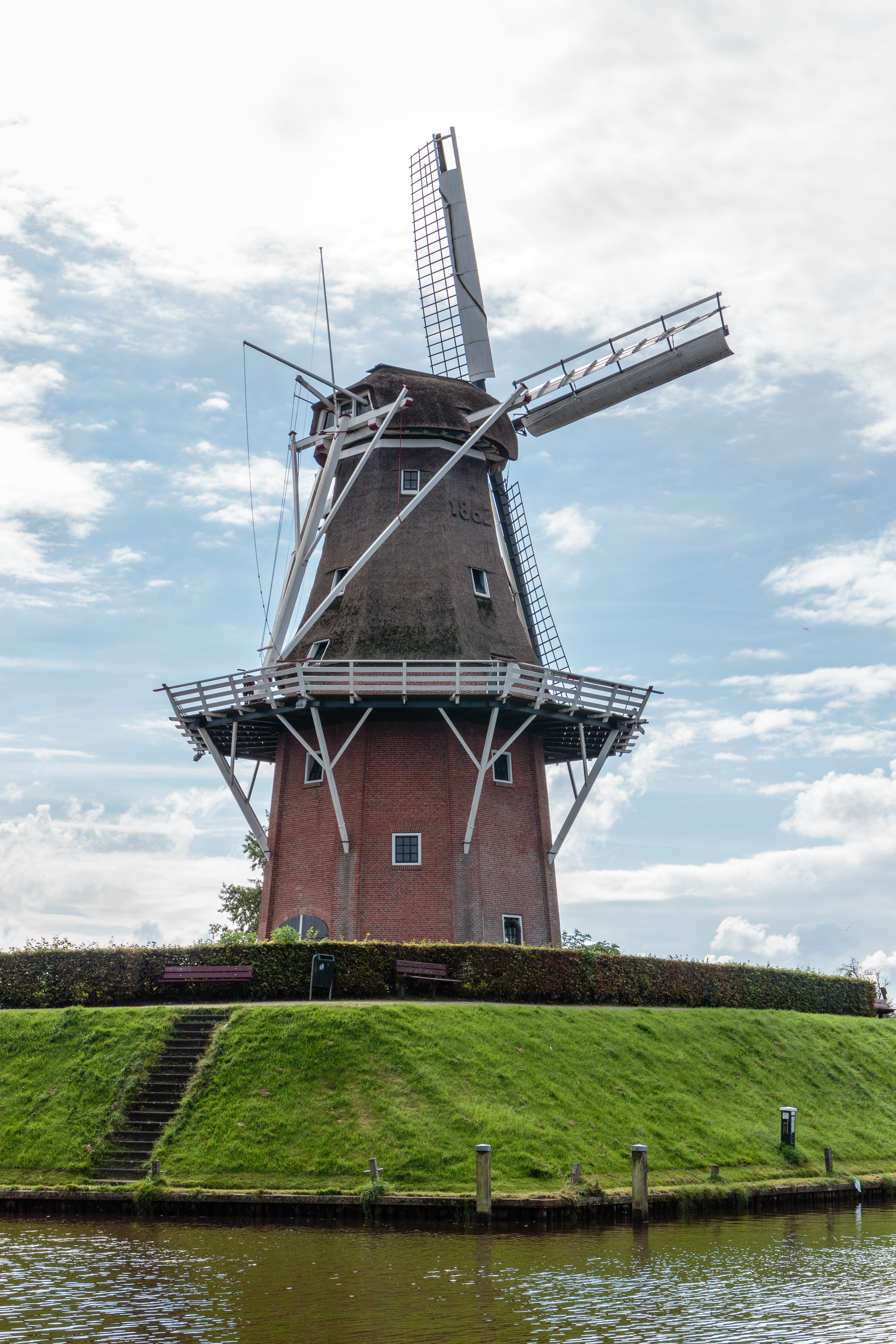
Zeldenrust

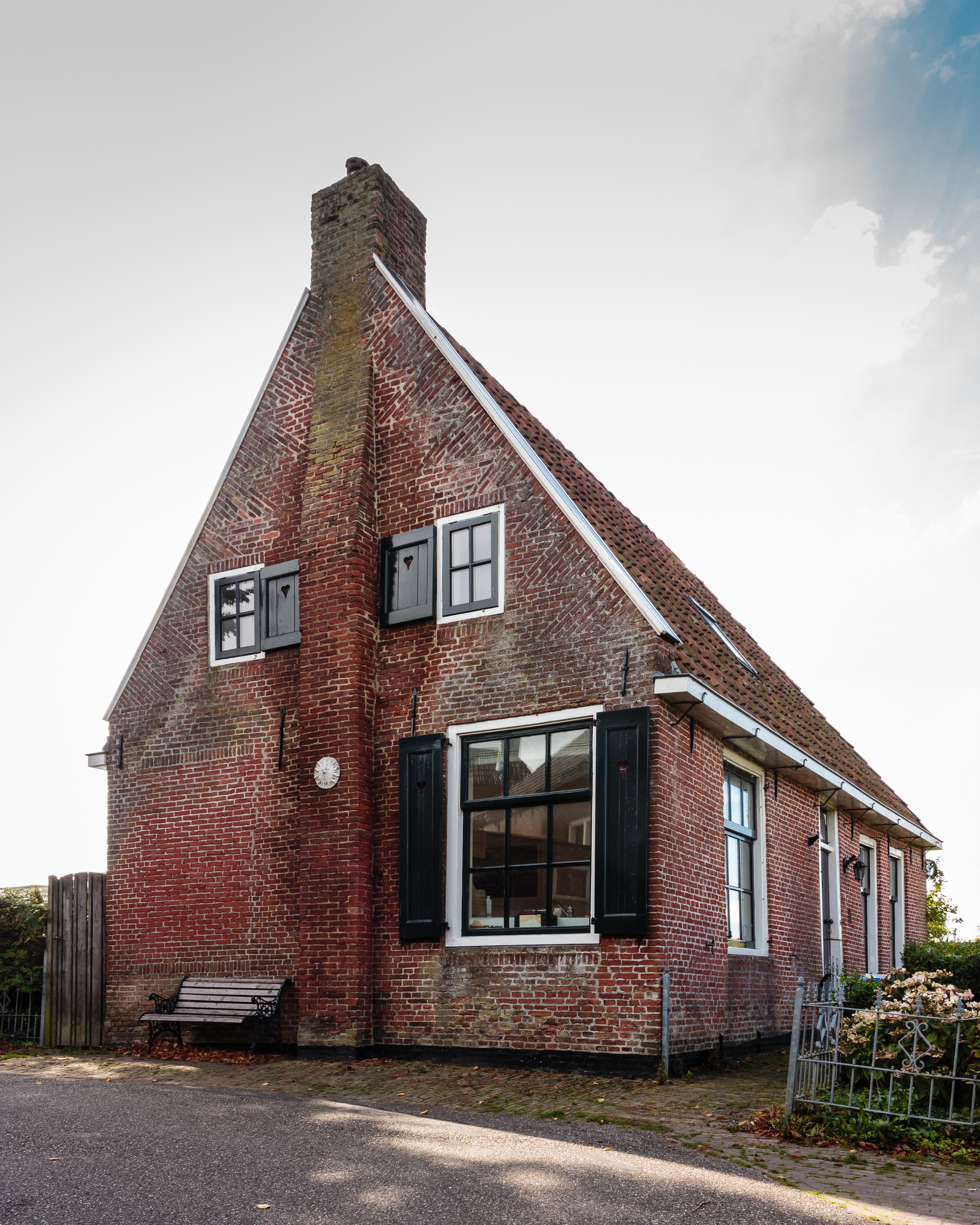
house next to mill Zeldenrust

== Gallery ==
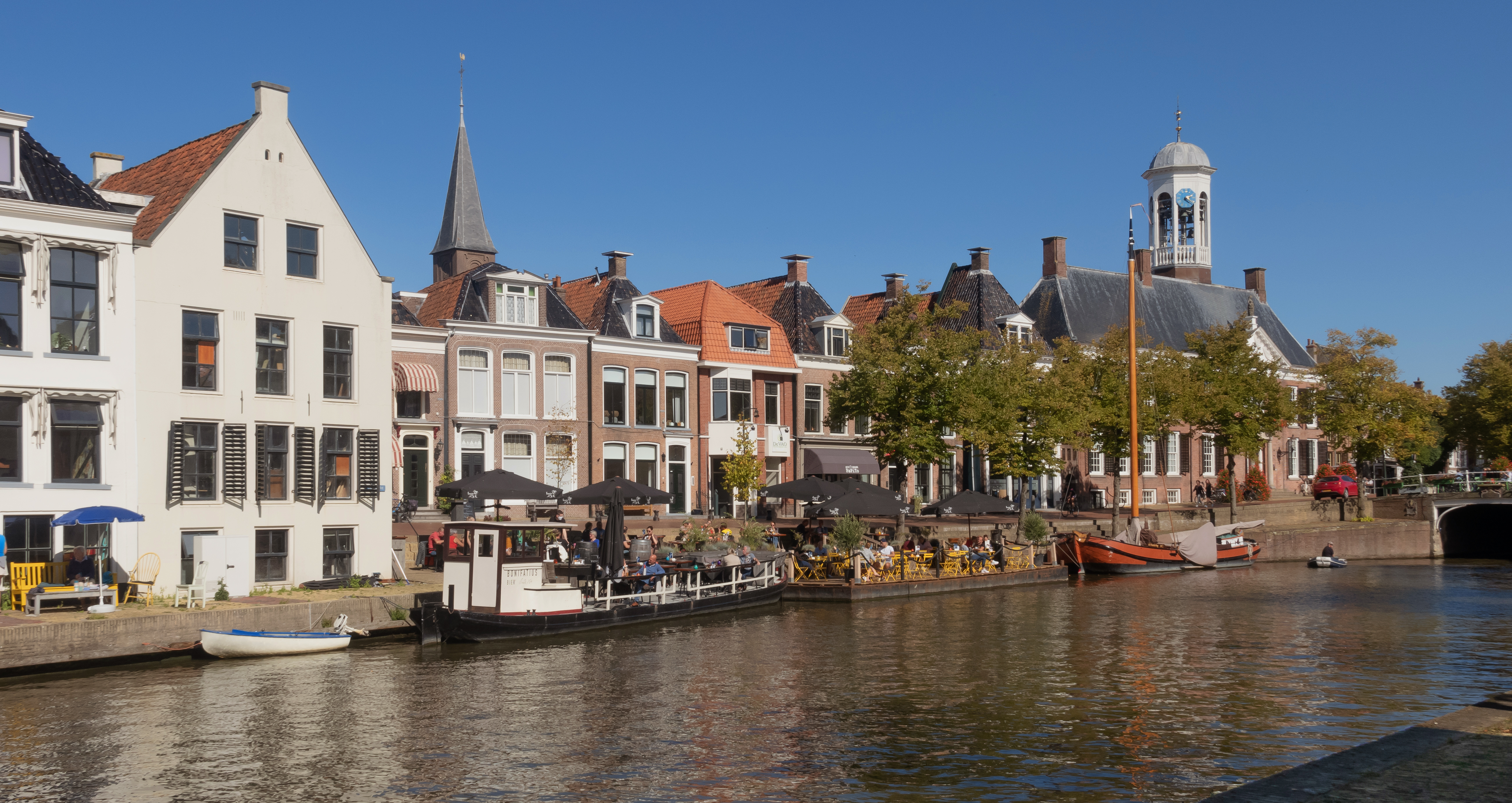
Inner harbour

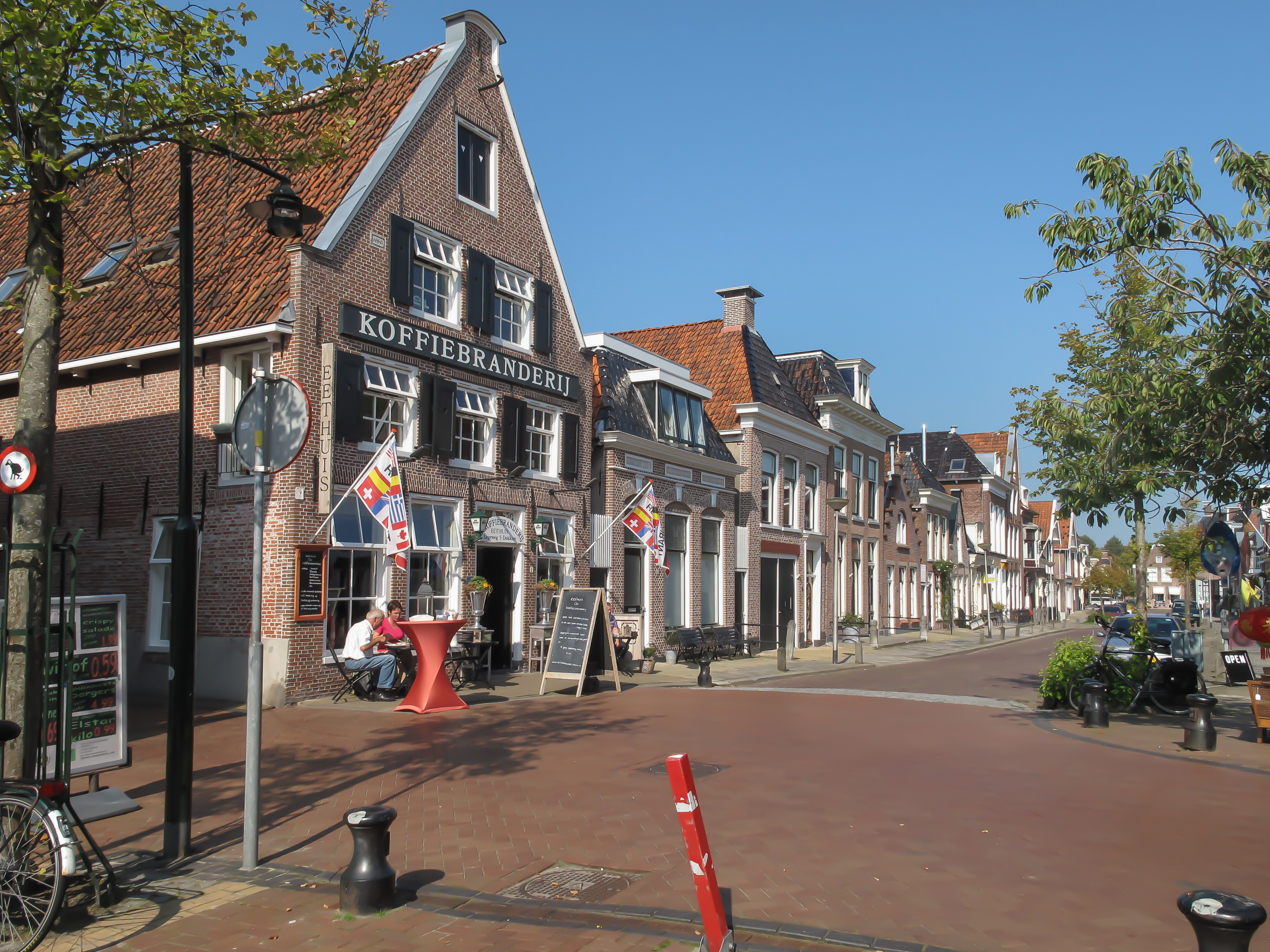
View to a street

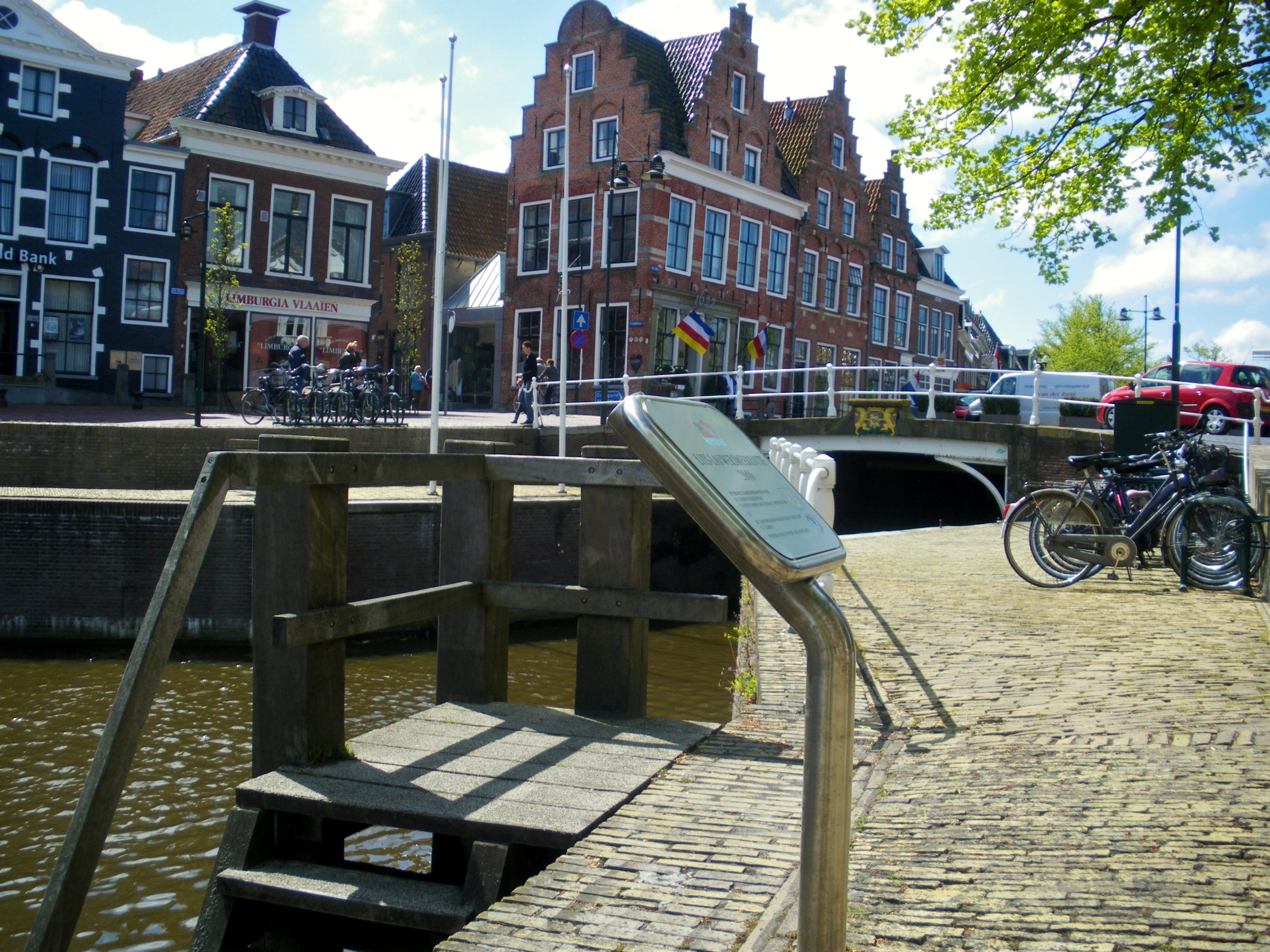
City's center around De Zijl, Dokkumer Grootdiep flowing underneath

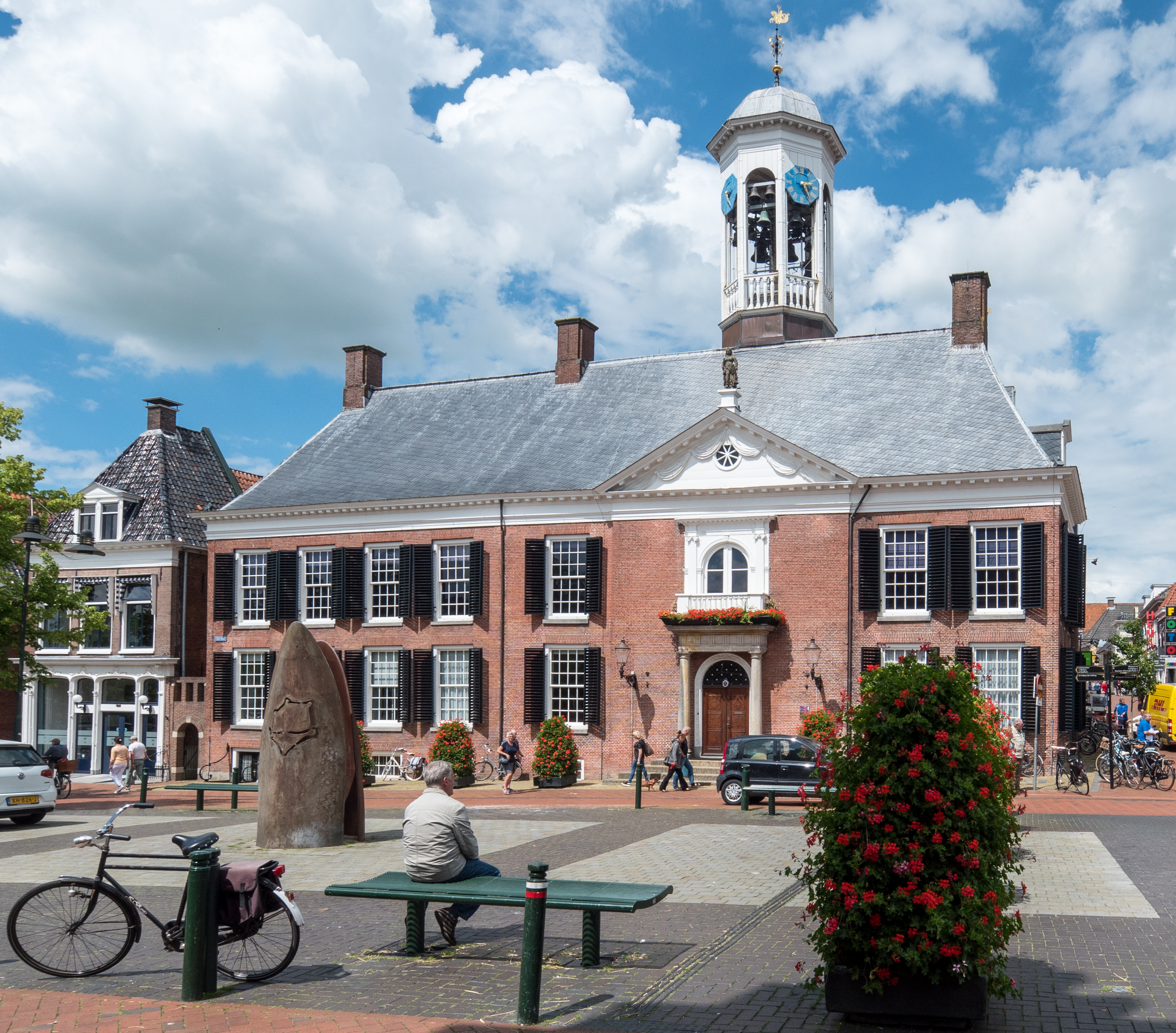
Old townhouse in the city centre

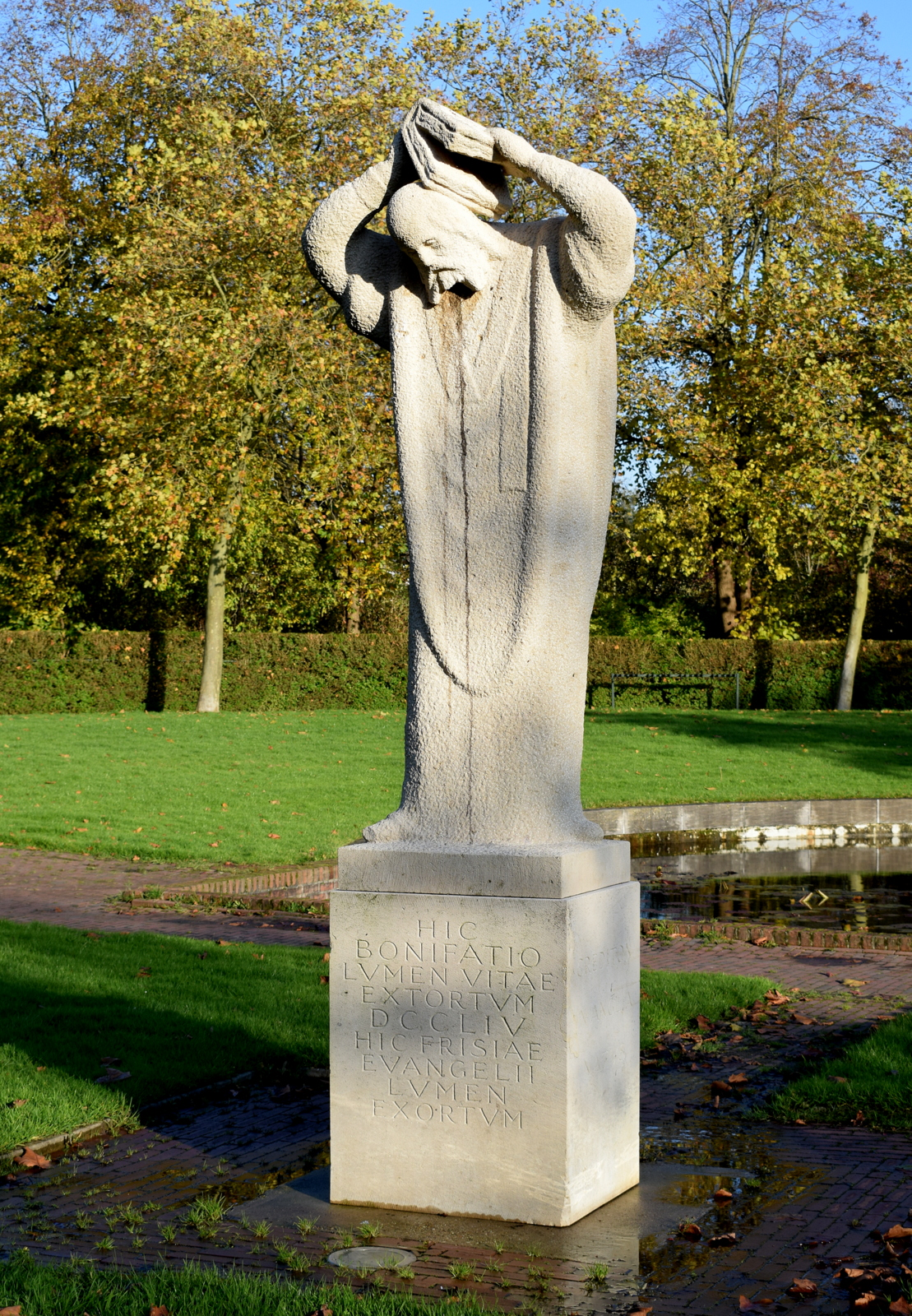
Statue of Saint Boniface near Saint Boniface Chapel

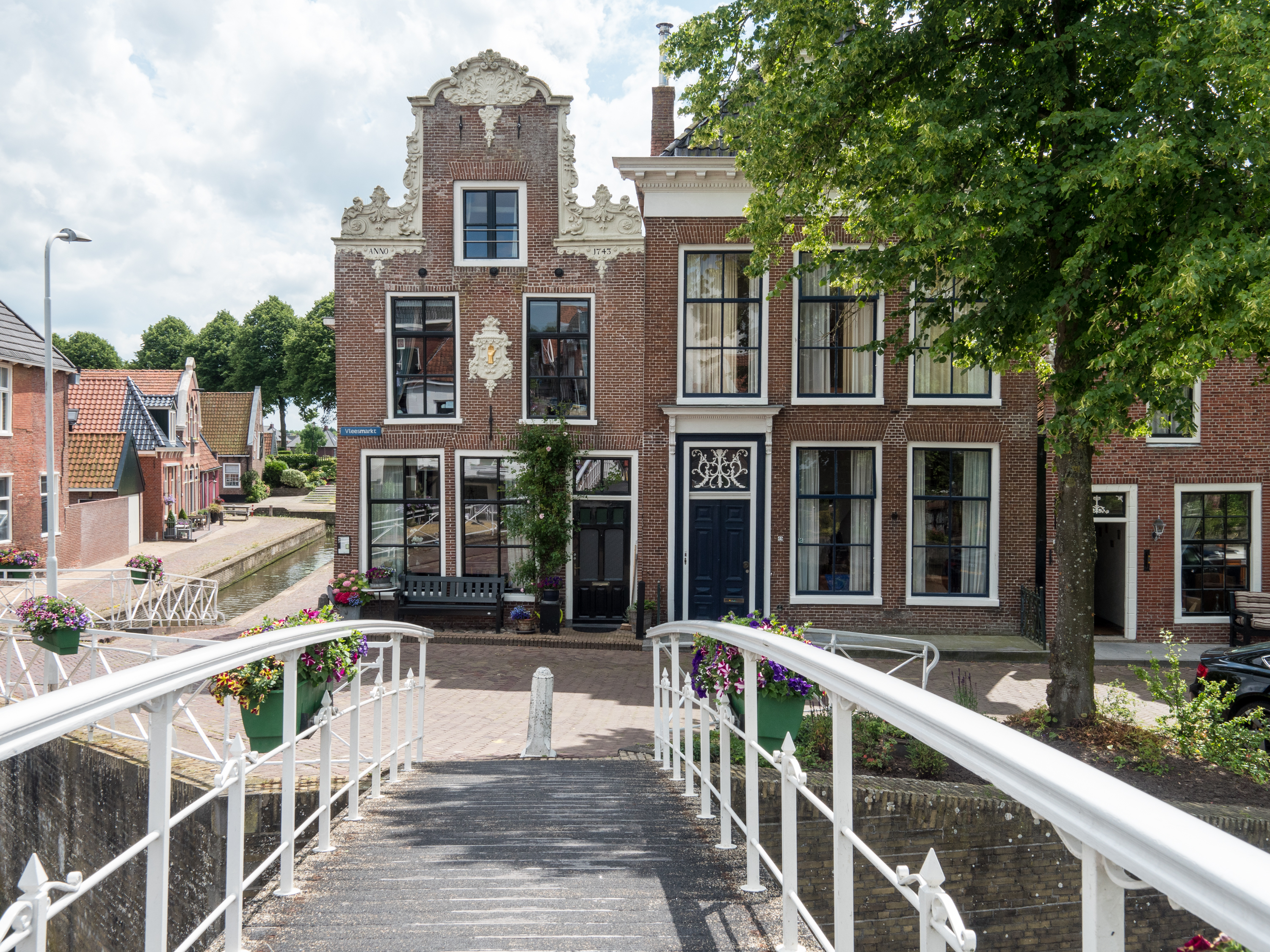
Numerous footbridges in the centre

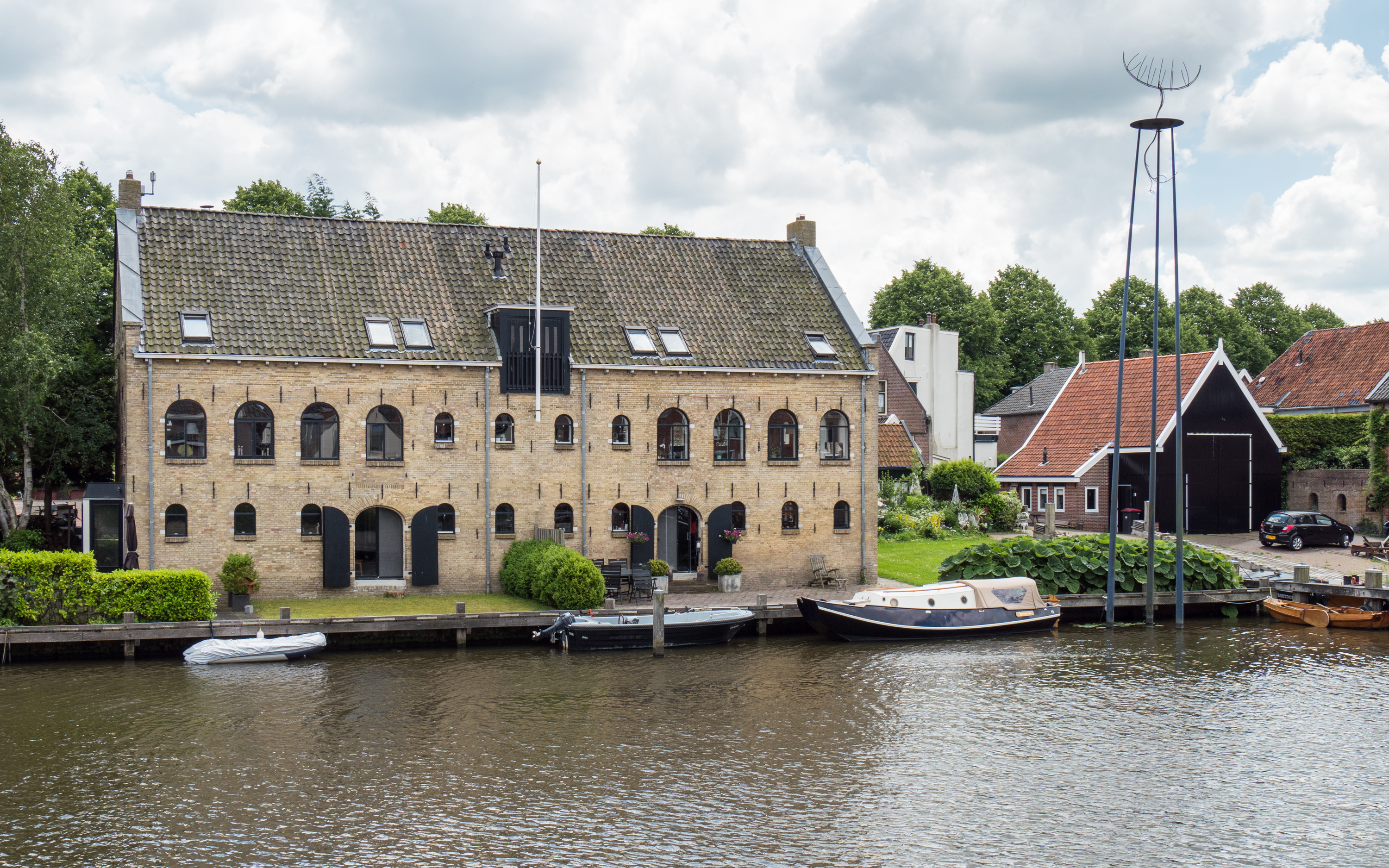
Wharf of the former Frisian Admiralty

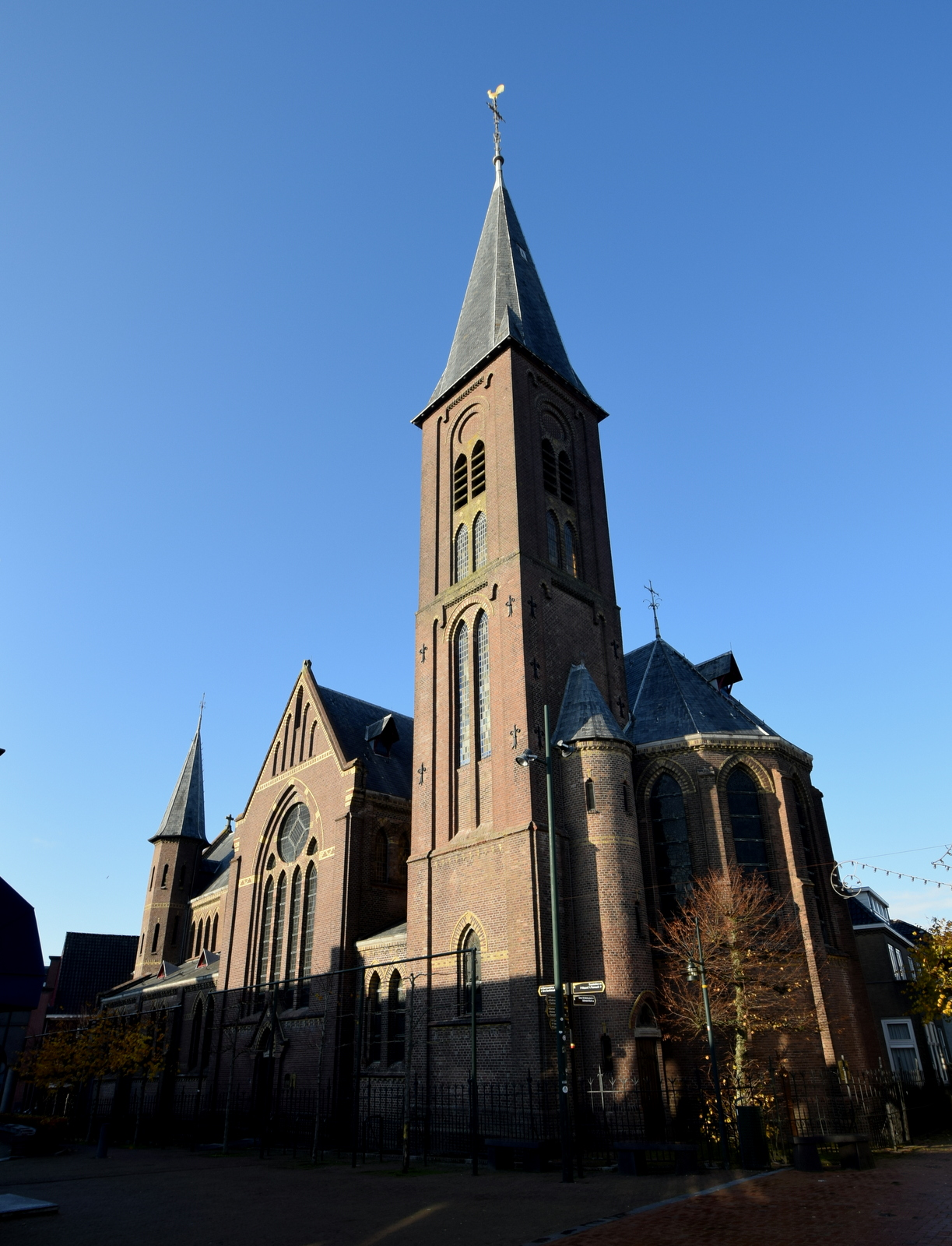
Saint Boniface Church (1871) in the centre of Dokkum

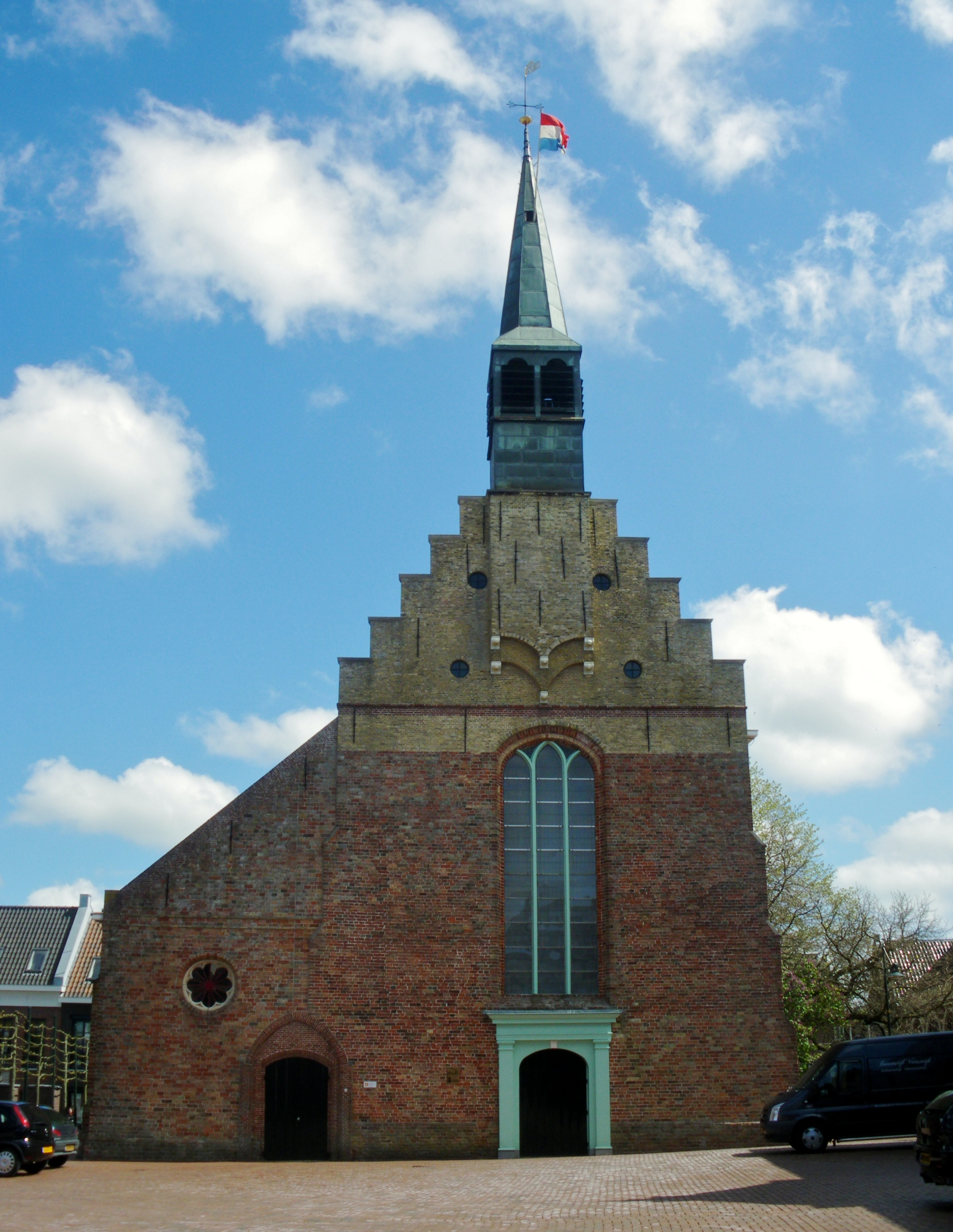
Grote of Sint-Martinus Church (Dokkum)

== Notable Dokkumers ==
Dokkum was the residence of the pioneering midwife Catharina Geertruida Schrader (1656–1746) for much of her career. Other famous Dokkumers include:

- Gemma Frisius (1508–1555), scientist
- Lieuwe van Aitzema (1600–1669), prominent diplomat and historian
- Ulrik Huber (1636–1694), lawyer
- Rein Jan Hoekstra (1941–2025), lawyer, member of the Council of State of the Netherlands
- Jan Posthuma (1963), 1996 volleyball Olympic gold medalist
- Sipke Jan Bousema (1976), TV-presenter
- Theo Pijper (1980), international speedway rider
- Saint Boniface (672–754) Exeter, Dokkum
- Dirk Rafaelsz Camphuysen (1586–1627) Gorinchem, Dokkum
- Catharina Geertruida Schrader (1656–1746) Bentheim, Dokkum
- Focko Ukena (1370–1435), East Frisian chieftain (hoveling), conquered Dokkum
- Sharon Vazanna (born 1982), choreographer, dancer

=== Mayors ===
- Albert Jonker (1878- 1954)
- Sybren van Tuinen (1913-1993)

== See also ==
- Zuider Ee
