= Münster Cathedral =

- The Cathedral Church of Saint Paul
- St.-Paulus-Dom
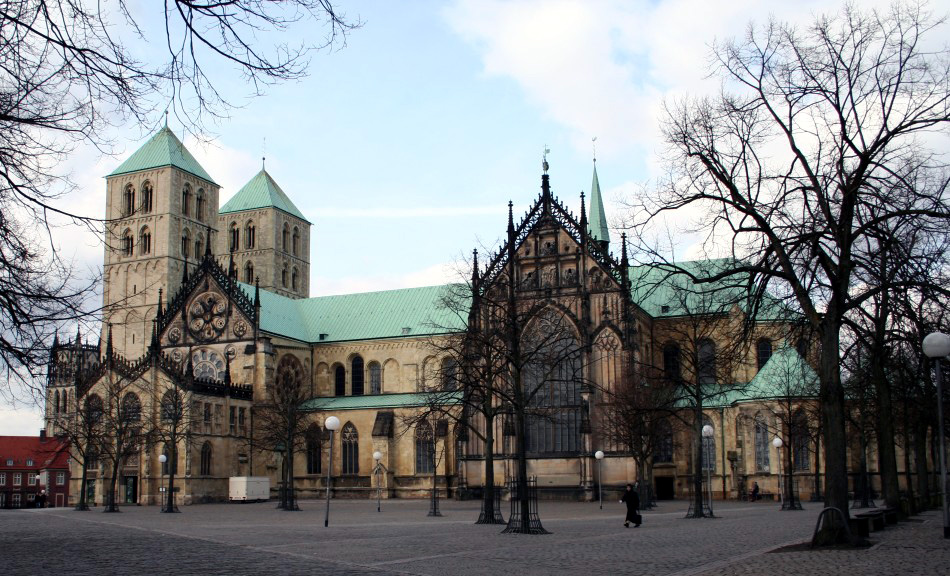
- St. Paul Cathedral and the Cathedral Square
- Münster Cathedral
- 51°57′47″N 7°37′32″E
- Location: Münster
- Country: Germany
- Denomination: Catholic
- Website: www.paulusdom.de

Architecture
- Style: Romanesque and Gothic

Administration
- Diocese: Münster

Clergy
- Bishop: Heiner Wilmer
- Dean: Christoph Hegge

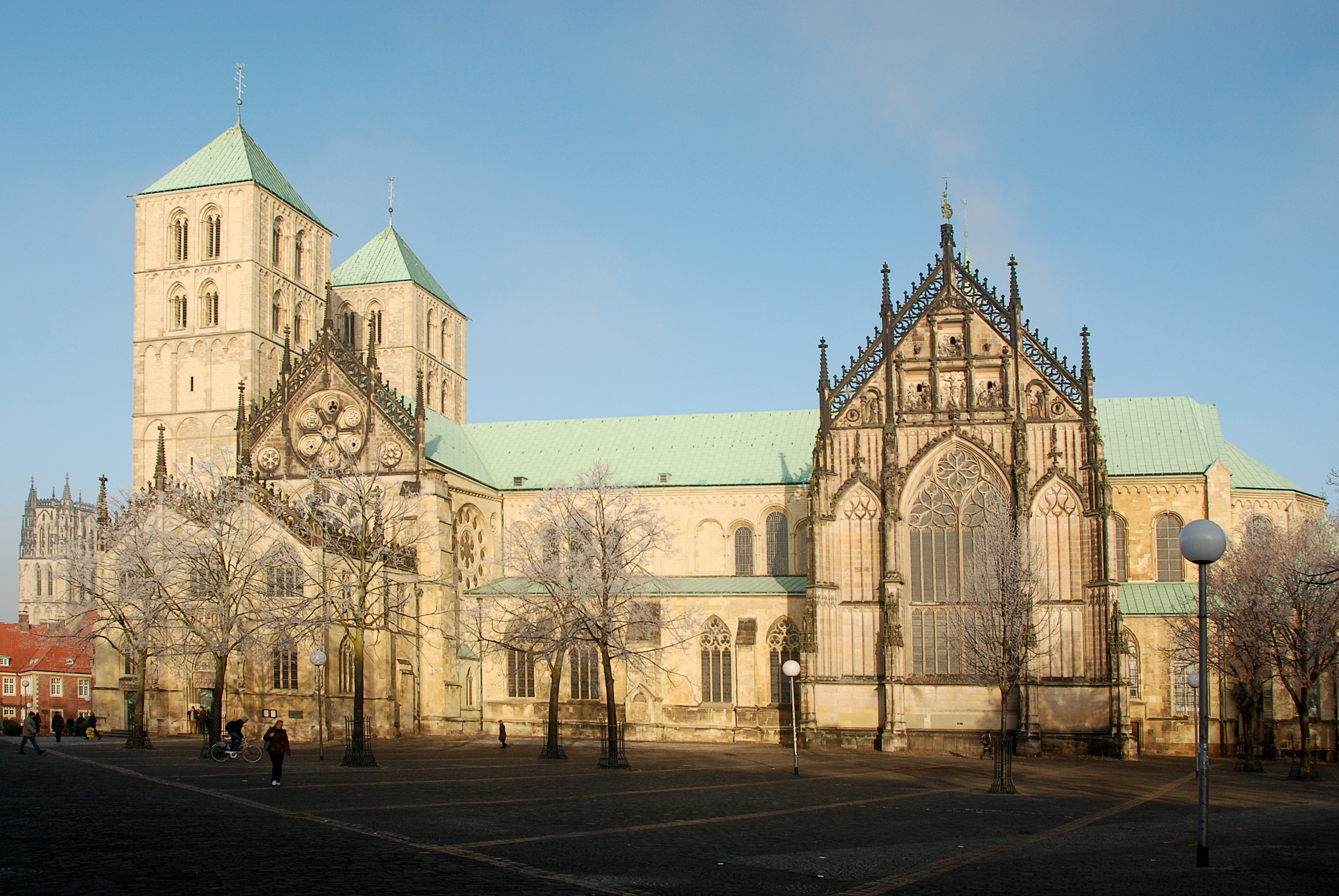
St.-Paulus-Dom from the Domplatz

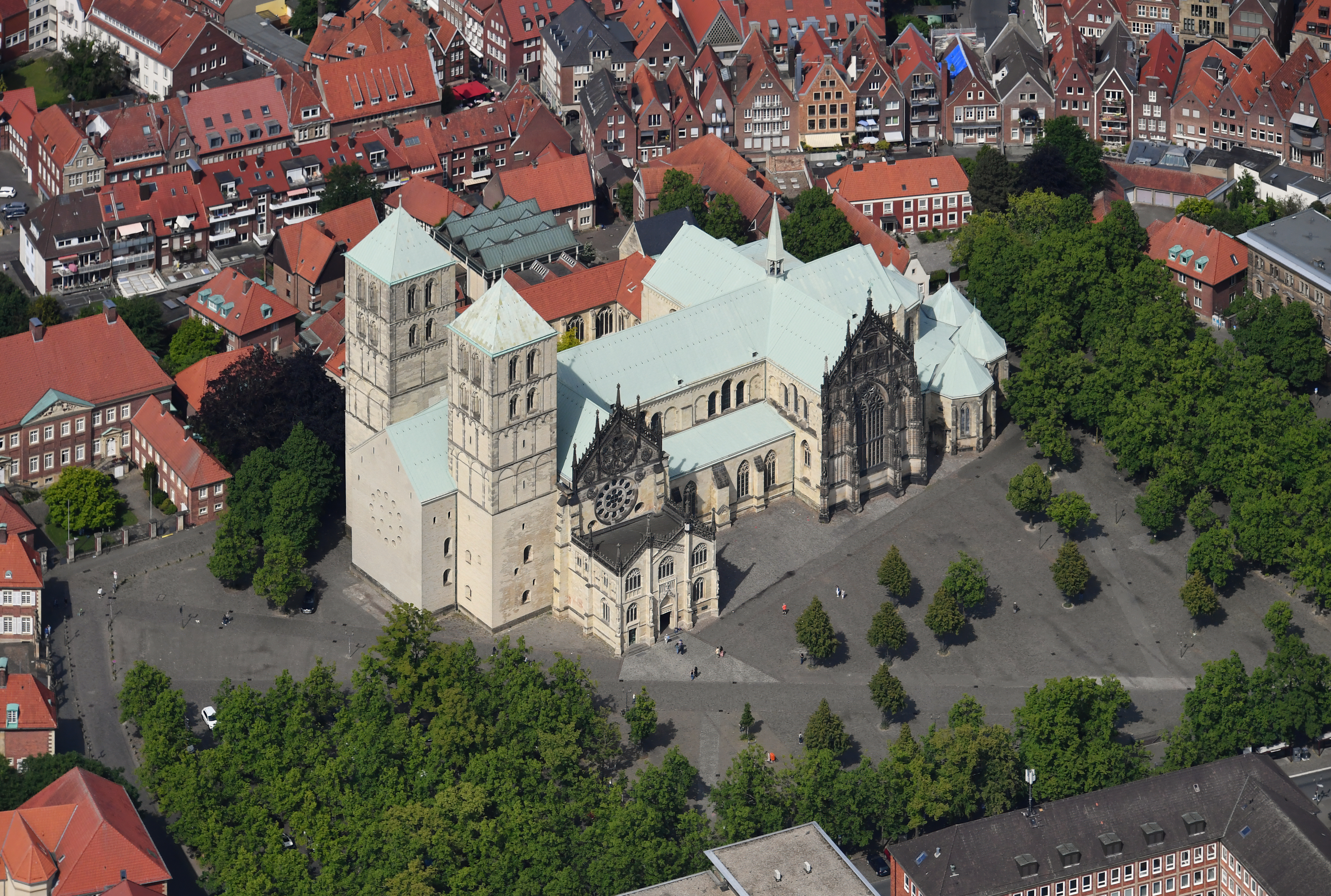
Aerial view

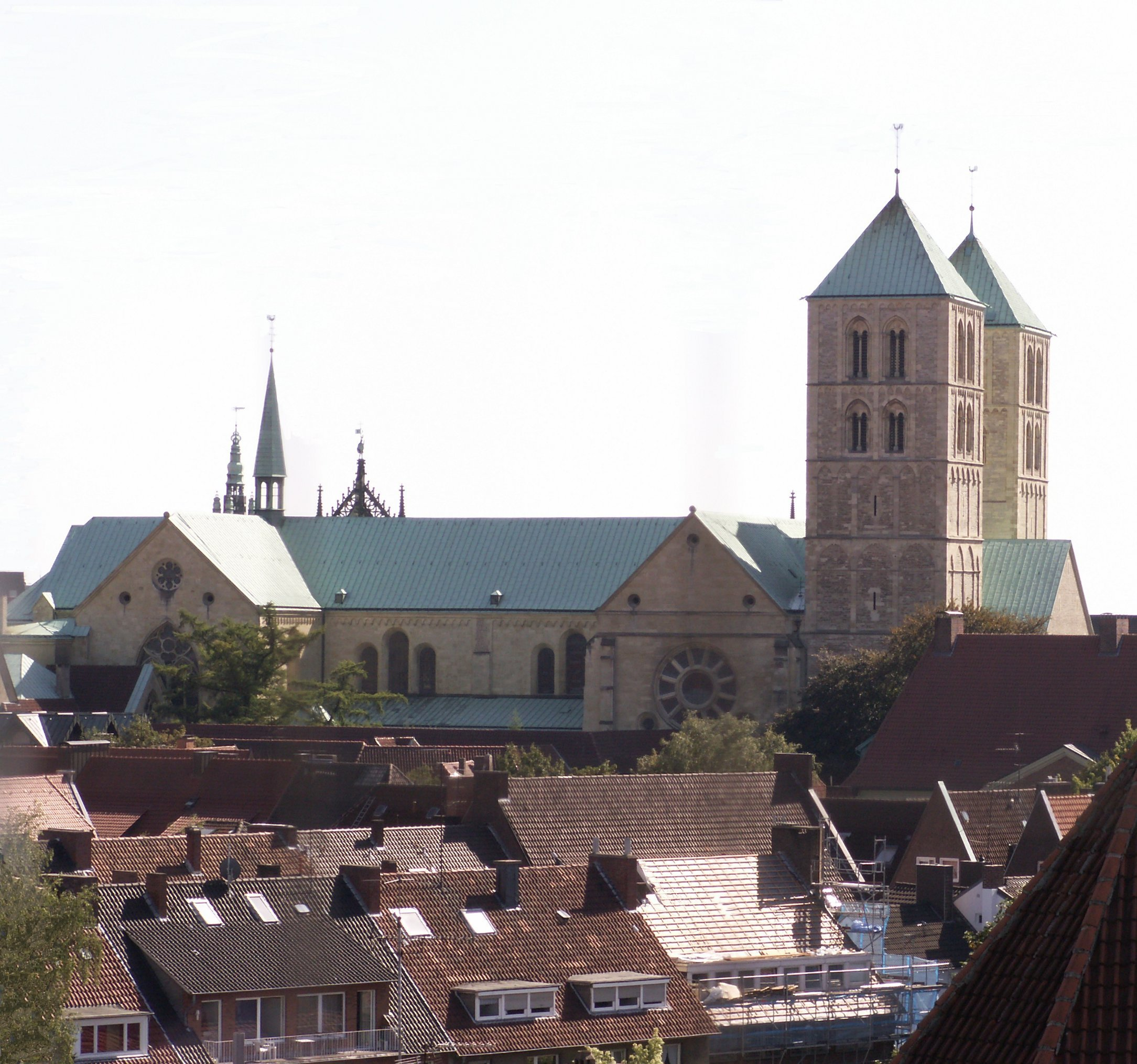
View from the north (from the Buddenturm)

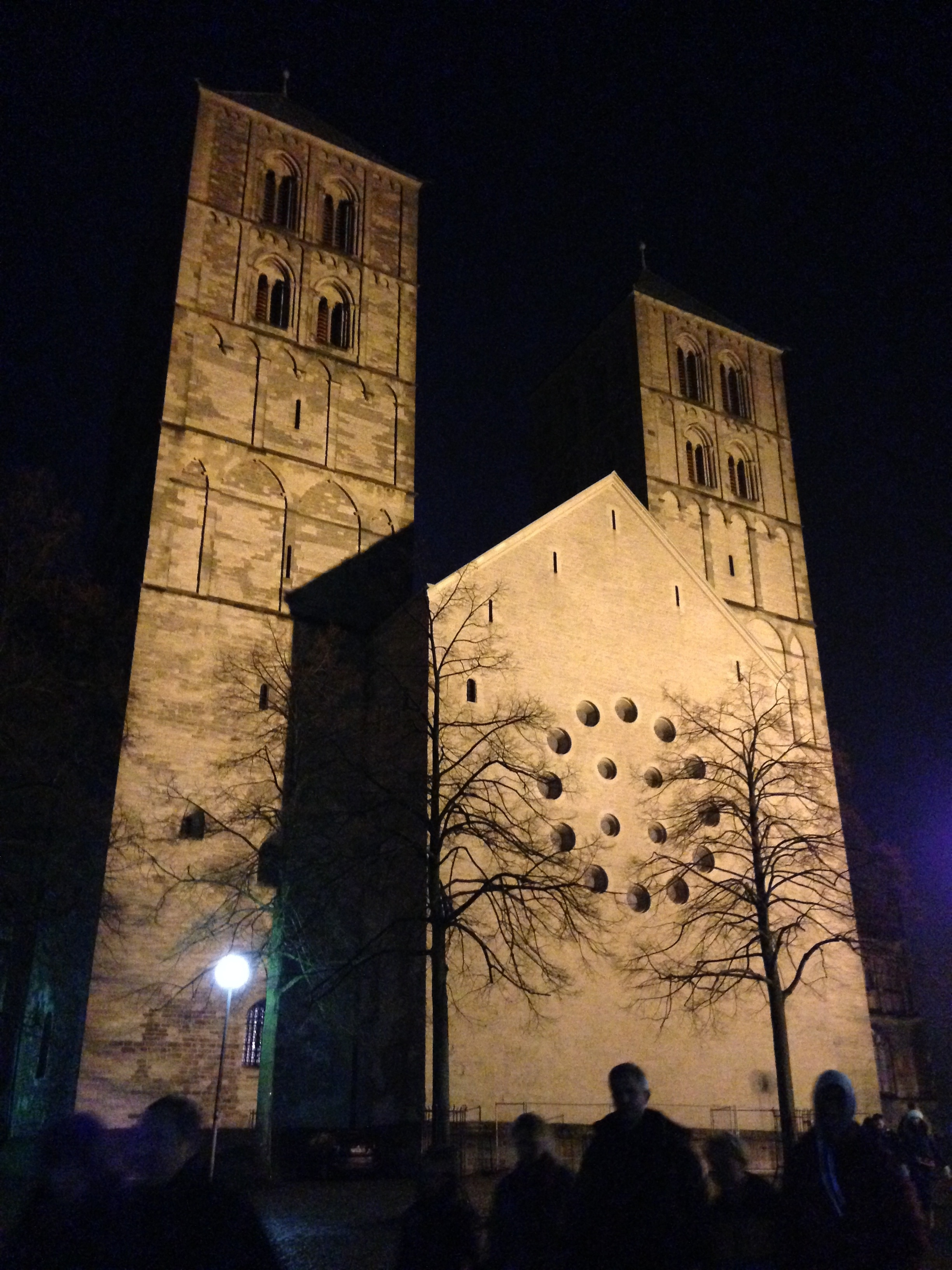
Facade of St.-Paulus-Dom at night

Münster Cathedral or St.-Paulus-Dom is the cathedral church of the Catholic Diocese of Münster in Germany, and is dedicated to Saint Paul. It is counted among the most significant church buildings in Münster and, along with the City Hall, is one of the symbols of the city.

The cathedral stands in the heart of the city, on a small hill called Horsteberg, which is encircled by the Roggenmarkt, Prinzipalmarkt and Rothenburg streets and by the Münstersche Aa river. This area, which also contains the Domplatz and surrounding buildings, was the old Domburg. Today the cathedral is the parish church for this area. West of the cathedral lies the bishop's palace and part of the old curia complex along with the current cathedral chapter.

The cathedral had two predecessors. The first cathedral (called the Ludgerus Dom, 805–1377) stood to the north of the current cathedral; the second cathedral was built in the tenth or eleventh century and was demolished during the construction of the third and current cathedral between 1225 and 1264. The imposing westwerk with its nearly identical towers was built as part of the second cathedral around 1192 and was incorporated into the current building. As a result, the cathedral is a mixture of styles, combining the Romanesque westwerk, old choir, and west towers with the Gothic nave, transepts, high choir and ring of chapels.

Each of the cathedral buildings served as the cathedral church of the Diocese of Münster, but each also had additional functions, at least at times. The original Carolingian cathedral was also the collegiate church for a monastery founded by Liudger, with the monks living under the rule of Chrodegang. Each cathedral served as a parish church, originally for the whole of Münster. As a result of the foundation of further parish churches, the parish district of the cathedral was reduced to the Old Domburg and Domimmunität in 1090. In the first half of the thirteenth century, the Church of St Jacobi was built on the Domplatz. With the completion of this church, the cathedral, which was then under construction, lost its function as a parish church entirely. Since the demolition of St Jacobi in 1812, the cathedral regained its role as the parish church for the Old Domburg and Domimmunität.

The cathedral contains the tomb of former Bishop of Münster Clemens August Graf von Galen, who became a cardinal shortly before his death in 1946 and was beatified by Pope Benedict XVI in 2005.

== Predecessors ==
The current St. Paulus Dom is, in fact, the third cathedral of the diocese of Münster. It was built between 1225 and 1264 and was preceded first by a Carolingian cathedral and second by an Ottonian cathedral.

An overview of the three cathedral buildings follows:

Century	Year	Building	Style	Demolition
9.	805	First cathedral (Ludgerus-Dom)	Preromanesque	1377
10/11	Uncertain	Second cathedral	Ottonian	c.1225
12	1192	Westwerk (Old choir, towers)	Romanesque	Largely survives
13	1225–1264	Third cathedral (St. Paulus Dom)	Gothic	

=== Carolingian cathedral (805–1377) ===
The first cathedral was created after the appointment of Liudger as Bishop of Münster in 805. It is therefore known as the Dom des heiligen Liudger or Ludgerus Dom.

==== Presumed appearance ====
It was long assumed that the first cathedral was a smaller church, especially because of the history of the foundation by Tibus. Only in 1904 did Savel suggest that the original cathedral was a three-naved basilica. He calculated its width using the northern stairs of the Domplatz and came to a figure of around 20 metres.

Further understanding was brought by the 1936 excavations by Wieschebrink, the director of the diocesan museum. These revealed that the first cathedral stood largely on the site of the later cloisters and Domherrenfriedhof. From the remains of the foundations, it was possible to conclude that the northern side aisle was about 8.3 meters wide, including the outer walls and foundations of the buttresses. Assuming that the nave was double the width of the side aisle (as usual in early medieval church buildings), the first cathedral would have been 27.6 metres wide in total. Based on the excavations, the length is estimated to have been 31.2 metres.

In the northwestern corner of the building, Wieschebrink found additional foundations of a rectangular wall, which were 2 metres thick – considerably thicker than the rest of the walls. From these remains he concluded that there had been a square tower with 8.3-metre-long (27 ft) edges.

==== Location ====
The Ludgerus-Dom stood north of the current cathedral, roughly where the cloisters, Domherrenfriedhof, Marienkapelle and sacristry are located today. It was only demolished in the fourteenth century, well after the completion of the third cathedral. It, therefore, outlived the second, Ottonian cathedral entirely.

Until its demolition, the Ludgerus Dom remained largely unaltered. After the consecration of the second cathedral, it was left unused for almost a hundred years. At this time, part of the southwestern corner was demolished for the construction of a chapel, at the order of Bishop Dodo. Only with the foundation of the Collegiate Stift of the Old Dom by Bishop Burchard did the Ludgerus Dom regain a function: the chapter used it as a choir.

On 18 August 1377, Bishop Floris van Wevelinkhoven, the two churches side-by-side blocked the light and ordered the demolition of the Ludgerus Dom. After its demolition, the so-called "Alte Dom" was erected northwest of the original cathedral. This building replaced the Ludgerus Dom as the choir of the chapter.

=== Ottonian cathedral ===
The second cathedral was built immediately to the south of the first one. It was located on the site of the third and current cathedral.

==== Construction date ====
The date of the second cathedral's construction is not certain.

Art historian Max Geisberg (1875–1943) argued that the second cathedral was built during the reign of Bishop Dodo between 967 and 993. This position was supported by the fact that other important cathedral buildings had a west transept already in the 10th and early 11th centuries. This transept was then reused in the construction of the third and current cathedral. In view of this presumed construction under the Ottonian dynasty, the second cathedral is referred to as the Ottonian cathedral.

The diocese of Münster assumed that the second cathedral was built in the second half of the eleventh century, in response to a fire in the first cathedral which apparently occurred in 1071. The Überwasserkirche only a few hundred metres away was similarly burnt down in the same fire. According to the diocese, the second cathedral was built between 1071 and 1090. The information of the diocese does not necessarily contradict Geisberg's conclusion since the diocese's claim is based on documentary information for the consecration of the second cathedral in 1090, which could have also occurred after a rebuild resulting from the fire.

==== Presumed appearance ====
The Ottonian cathedral was mostly demolished to build the third cathedral; today only fragments of the south wall of the side nave of the Ottonianbasilica survive.

The masonry of the western transept was also incorporated into the new building. To this day a large part of the west wall of the Ottonian transept survives (with the exception of the central portion, where the Old Choir was built around 1190), as well as parts of the south wall (which was incorporated into the northern interior wall of the "narthex"), much of the north wall and parts of the walls of the upper story on the east side.

No plans or depictions of the second cathedral survive from which the appearance of the second cathedral could be reconstructed. Since the modern "third" cathedral is located on the same spot as the second cathedral, excavations cannot be undertaken to determine its dimensions or appearance. Based on the surviving remnants of the walls it is only possible to determine the measurements of the Ottonian cathedral's western transept (c. 36.6 m from north to south and 12.4 m from east to west), the interior width of the side-aisle (c.6 m) and nave (c. 12 m), as well as the thickness of the exterior walls of the side-aisle (c.1 m) and the walls between the side-aisles and the nave (c.1.5 m). In total, therefore, the second cathedral appears to have been about 30 m wide.

== Construction of the modern cathedral ==
The numbers and letters in brackets in the following section refer to the ground plan below.

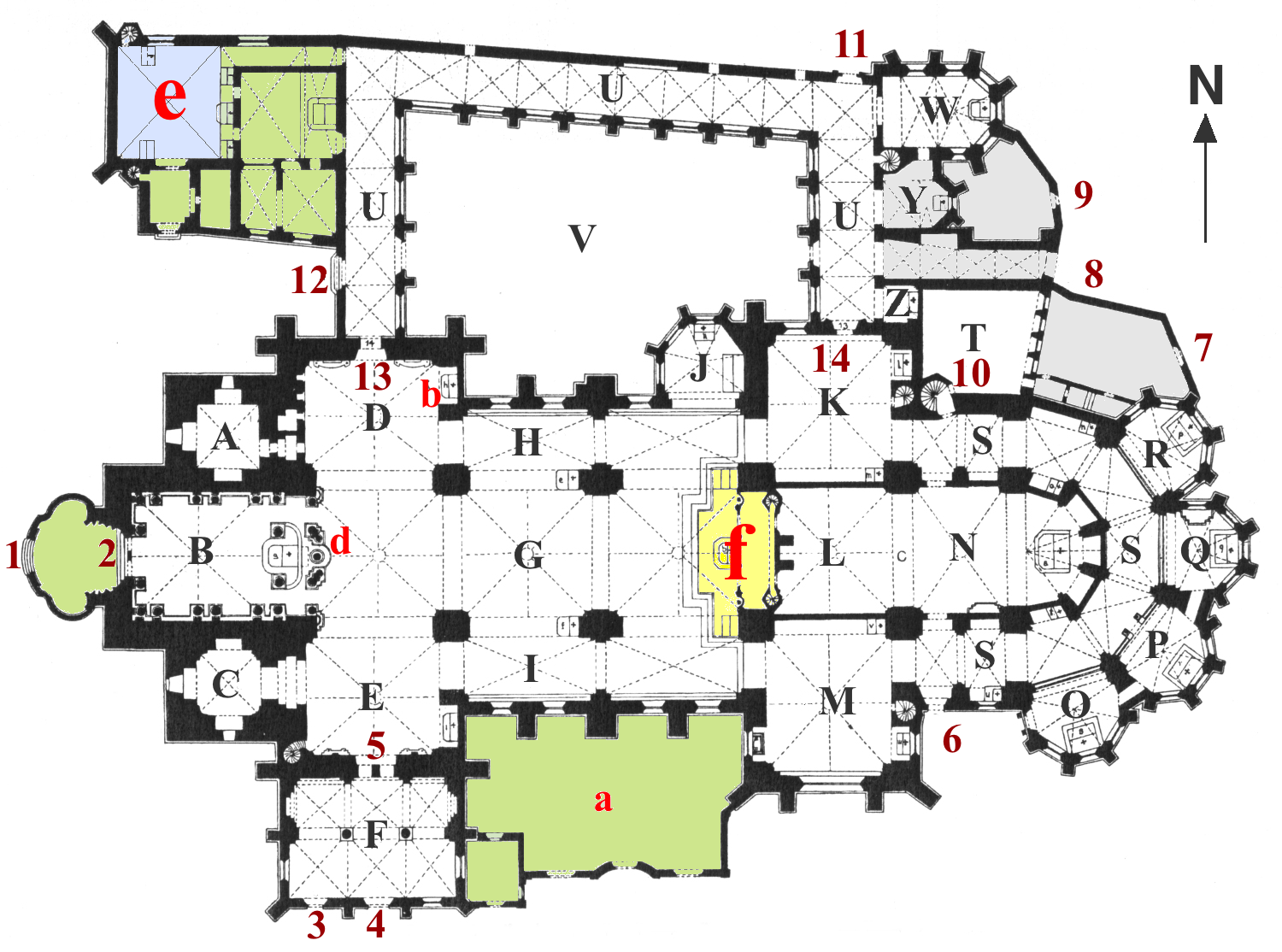
Ground plan c. 1761 Letters = Rooms, Numbers = Passageways. Green = Rooms which no longer exist; Yellow = former Apostelgang Blue = former Old Cathedral

=== Romanesque westwerk (after 1192) ===
In 1192, at the order of Bishop Hermann II von Katzenelnbogen (and at his own expense) a new westwerk was added to the (Ottonian) cathedral. This consisted of the Old Choir (B), located in the current western apse, flanked by two towers (A and C) in the Romanesque style.

This westwerk was integrated into the third cathedral and mostly survives today.

=== Gothic cathedral ===
The foundation stone for the third and current St Paulus Dom was laid in 1225 by Bishop Dietrich III. von Isenberg. Unlike the two previous construction processes, the builder was not the bishop but the Chapter of the New Cathedral (Kapitel des Neuen Doms), which had clearly gained influence in the meantime.

In 1264, after nearly forty years of construction, St Paulus Dom was completed and on 30 September 1264 it was consecrated by Bishop Gerhard von der Mark.

It consists of a domed basilica with double transepts in the Gothic style. The cathedral is 108.95 metres long. The western transept is 52.85 metres wide, including the narthex (40.53 metres wide without it). The nave (G), with two side-aisles (H and I) between the two transepts, has a width of 28.3 metres. The eastern transept is 43.4 metres wide. Most of the earlier structure was torn down to make way for the present building, but some parts were reused. Among these are the westwerk, parts of the western transept (D and E), and parts of the wall of the southern side-aisle (I). As a result, the building is a mixture of the Romanesque and Gothic styles.

==== 14th century ====
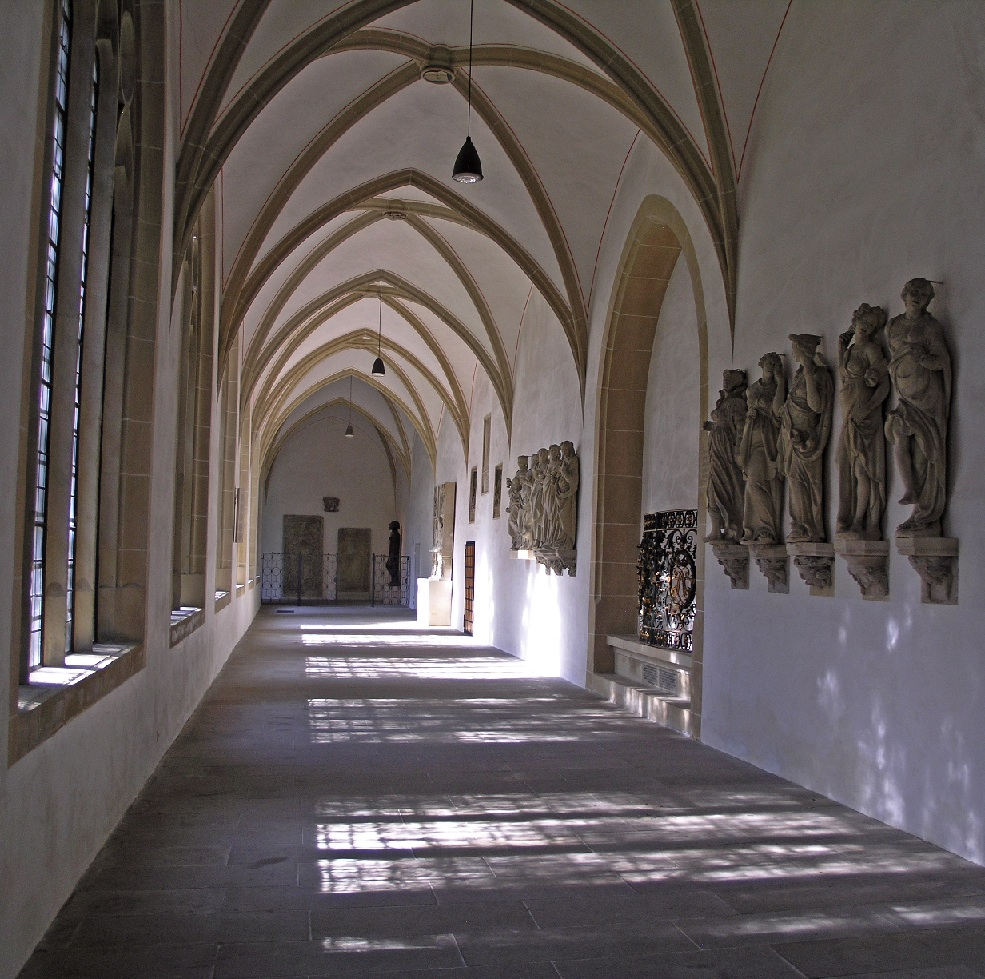
Cloister, north wing

In 1377 the first cathedral was demolished and the so-called Alte Dom or Old Cathedral (e) was built, as a replacement for the first cathedral, which had been used as a choir by the chapter of the Old (Ludgerus) cathedral. Like the modern cathedral, the Alte Dom was built in the gothic style.

In 1390, the Marienkapelle (W), Annenkapelle (Y) and Elisabethkapelle (Z) were built – the latter two were incorporated into the new sacristry in 1885. Between 1390 and 1395, the cloisters (U) were built. In the process, part of the Alte Dom built shortly beforehand must have been demolished and moved to the west. Thereafter the Alte Dom was flanked by the west transept and the western end of the cloisters until its demolition in 1875.

==== 16th and 17th centuries ====
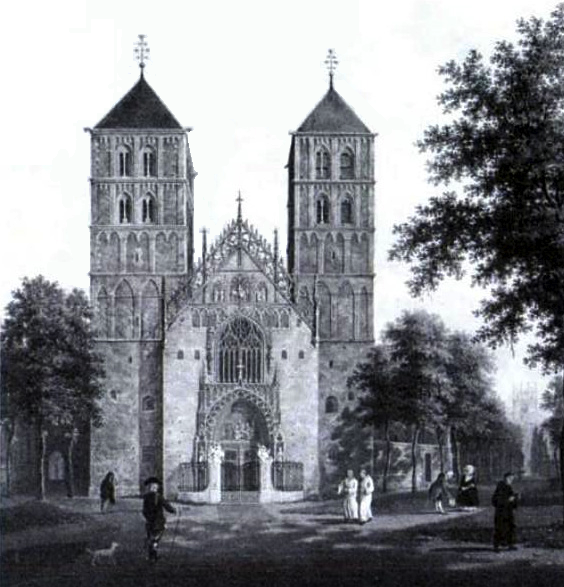
The west facade and the Domplatz in 1784

Around 1516 the (formerly High Gothic) west portal (2) was expanded and redone in the Late Gothic style.

During the Anabaptist rule of Münster in 1534 and 1535, the cathedral was not spared from destruction at the hands of the Anabaptists. In the iconoclasm of 1534, numerous images and figures were destroyed, including those by Heinrich Brabender, as well as the original astronomical clock which dated from 1408 (since it was decorated with biblical images).

After the end of Anabaptist rule, the interior of the cathedral was renovated, and the chapter hall (T) was built. Heinrich Brabender's son Johann Brabender made new sculptures to replace those that had been destroyed. Ludger und Hermann tom Ring, two important Westphalian painters, repainted the cathedral. Between 1540 and 1542, the extant astronomical clock was installed. The second rood screen, the Apostelgang, followed between 1542 and 1549 – it was demolished in 1870.

In the 16th century, the main entrance hall of the cathedral, the "narthex" (F), and the southern extension of the east transept (M) were built, partially expanded and decorated with sculpture; towards the end of the 16th century an armaria was added to the ambulatory, the current Kreuzkapelle (R).

In 1663, Prince-Bishop Christoph Bernhard von Galen had three chapels (O, P and Q) built onto the ambulatory, south of the armaria. These chapels, called the Von Galenschen Kapellen after him, mimic the shape of the armaria. In 1697, the Vicars' sacristry (J) was built between the northern part of the east transept (the so-called Stephanuschor, K) and the northern side-aisle. After the construction of the sacristry (X) in 1885, the cathedral treasury was built under the Vicars' sacristry. Today the Sakramentskapelle is located here.

==== 19th century ====
A new sacristry (X, on the "Plan of the Cathedral today") was built between the Marienkapelle (W) and the Chapter Hall (T) in 1885. For this new building, it was necessary to remove St.-Anna / Margareten-Kapelle (Y) which neighboured it to the south, the St.-Elisabeth-Kapelle (Z) which was between that chapel and the chapter hall and the passageway connecting the cloisters to the east side of the cathedral.

==== 20th century ====
In the Second World War, the cathedral was severely damaged by bombing. The collapse of the vaults and walls led to the destruction of the wall and ceiling decoration created by Hermann tom Ring in the middle of the 16th century and the west portal from the first half of the 16th century (2). The treasury was removed from the cathedral during the war and remained unscathed.

Between 1946 and 1956, the cathedral was rebuilt. With the exception of the paintings mentioned above and the west portal, the cathedral was reconstructed according to its original appearance. Thus, the altars and epitaphs were returned to their original places.

In 1955 and 1956, the high choir (N), the altar room (L) and the east transept were reorganised liturgically according to the plans of Emil Steffann. The Baroque high altar which was originally located in the high choir was relocated to the west wall of the Old Choir (Westchoir, B). The cathedra is also located in the high choir in the same location. The main altar (Volksaltar, people's altar) was placed in the middle of the crossing (L), with the pews arranged around it on three sides.

In 1981, the new cathedral treasury was opened. It bordered on the northern edge of the cloisters and contained the cathedral treasury as well as artistic and cultural items from throughout the diocese' history.

Between 1985 and 1990, the windows of the sidewalls of the ambulatory (S) and the surrounding ring of chapels (O, P, Q and R) were restored. These windows consisted of a cycle of 17 glass windows made by glass artist Georg Meistermann. The windows are decorated with abstract-geometric colour surfaces and symbolic Biblical motifs.

==== 21st century ====
===== Restoration (2009–2013) =====
From 2009 til the beginning of 2013, the cathedral underwent renovations – first the facade of the west choir, the west towers, the Salvator pediment and the roof supports. The entire 5500 m2 copper roof was refitted. From the end of 2011 interior work took place: upgrading the heating, ventilation, lighting, audio, and fire safety systems as well as repainting the interior. Fifteen agencies, 51 workshops and 350 individual workers took part in the phase of the renovations lasting from 7 June 2010 to 15 February 2013. During this period, 10,000 square metres of wall and vault surface were repainted, and 24 kilometres of cable were laid. Roofs, walls and artworks in the cathedral were cleaned and repainted. As part of the technological upgrades, an energy-saving heating system, modern LED lighting and a new microphone system were installed. The digital loudspeaker system was also redesigned and a loop installed for the hearing impaired. Disabled access was added at the portal to the astronomical clock. The wooden casing of the clock was replaced. Control of lights, audio and bells was centralised to a control centre in the sacristry. Bright light was ensured by light-wreaths and "light spouts" ("small brass arms extending from the walls, which look like waterspouts and throw their LED light onto the worshippers below and over the walls and ceiling above, so that the cathedral and its vaults are indirectly lit up by its rays.") The total cost of all these measures is believed to be around 14 million euros. During the renovation the grave chamber of the bishops under the west choir was entirely rebuilt; the access is located in the southern tower chapel (C). The building work made it possible for archaeological work to be carried out under the west choir and sacristry. The cathedral was reopened on 15 February 2013.

=== Former west portal ===
The westwerk initially did not include a true portal. The "Old Choir" probably only allowed access from the interior of the cathedral (i.e. from the west transept); the access was probably located at the southern end of the east wall of the Old Choir.

==== High Gothic portal (c. 1400) ====
Around 1400 a (first) portal in the High Gothic style was installed in the west wall of the Old Choir, in the same location as the later portal in the late gothic style (see below).

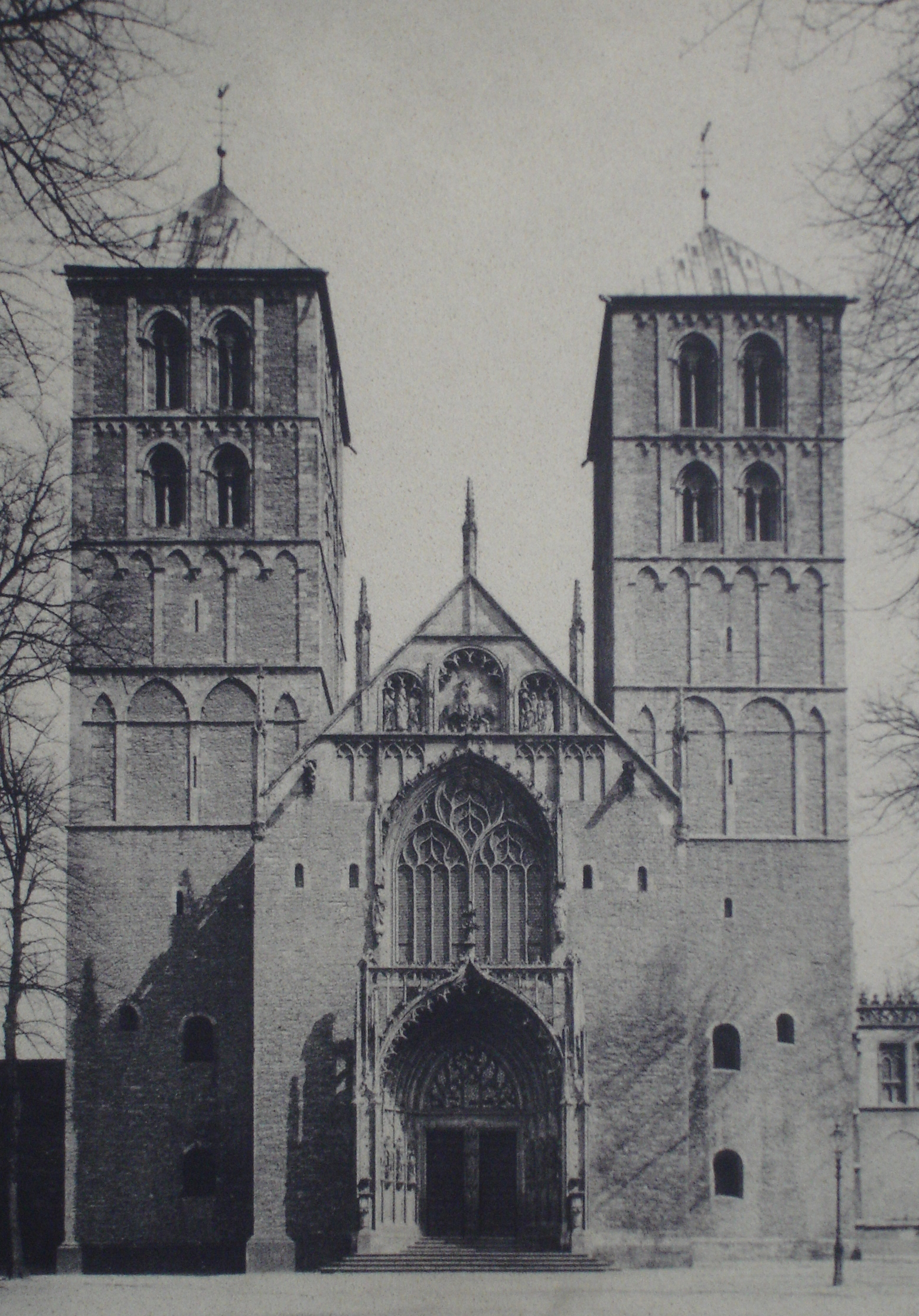
Westwerk with late gothic west portal, c. 1900

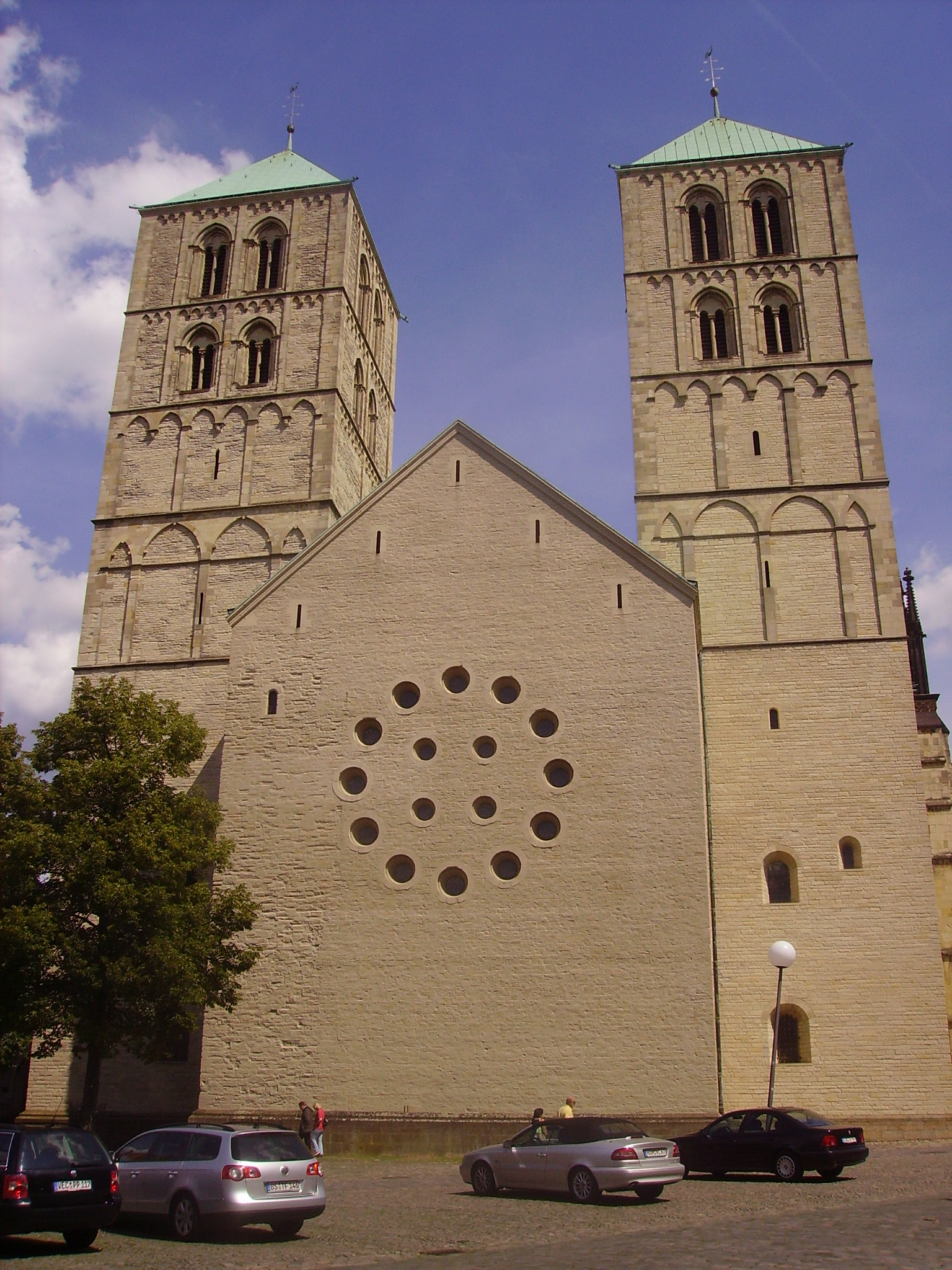
Simplified restored westwerk. Differences are clearly visible between the towers.

The niches of the recesses containing the doors were decorated with sculptures. It is assumed that a siren, a lamb and a lion decorated the left side, while a phoenix, a pelican and an eagle. Additional decoration consisted of wimperg and corbels decorated with foliage and long-haired, crowned female heads. These were very severely damaged during the Anabaptist rule of Münster in 1534–1535, after the Anabaptists launched an iconoclasm and destroyed sculptures and figures.

==== Late Gothic portal (1516) ====
In 1516 the portal was restored and expanded. This was a significant expansion of the cathedral: the result was an imposing west portal in the late gothic style, which formed a key part of the cathedral for almost 450 years.

The dry-stone pediment was replaced by a pediment of cut stone blocks and richly decorated with images and sculpture. Above the portal was a trace-work gallery with giant trace-work windows (9.62 m high and 6.7 m wide). On the sides were statues of St Paul and St Peter. Above the trace-work gallery were three pointed arch niches with life size sculptures depicting the triumphal entry into Jerusalem. The figures in the middle niche were 2.4 x 2.3 m in size, in the left niche 1.98 x 1.54 m and in the right niche 1.84 x 1.37 m. They were made by Heinrich Brabender and were the only figures in Münster to survive the iconoclasm of the Anabaptists, probably because their height made them too difficult to reach. Two corbels from the westwerk by Heinrich Brabender, one of which is probably a self-portrait, are now on display in the Westphalian State Museum of Art and Cultural History.

During a renovation of the west portal in 1850, the trace-work gallery and the pinnacles above the gable were restored. In 1904 the stained-glass windows were replaced by a painted glass window donated by Kaiser Wilhelm and created by the artist Carl de Bouché. This window depicted the meeting of Charlemagne, Pope Leo III and Liudger in 799 at Paderborn.

From the first half of the eighteenth century, the west portal had a forecourt which was divided off from the Domplatz by a stone balustrade and a high iron grill. It was created in 1710 at the earliest and in 1748 at the latest. The entrance on one side was decorated with a 1.66 m high and 1.74 m wide depiction of religion in the form of a woman with a cross and a tablet of laws enthroned on clouds, which was created by Johann Christoph Manskirch. A small angel pointed to the tablet, while a sinner was depicted falling into the depths with a snake in his hand. The depiction on the other side is not preserved and cannot be determined from old photographs. Max Geisberg considered it a depiction of the church, Guilleaume a depiction of the Old and New Testaments. The forecourt was expanded in 1873, in the process of which the iron railing is meant to have been sold to the Count of Landsberg.

==== After the Second World War ====
The portal was destroyed by a bombing raid in the Second World War and was not rebuilt after the war. The remains of the west portal were removed and replaced by a simple sandstone wall.

Before this, there was heated discussion among conservators and the people of Münster about how the portal should be restored. The plans of the bishop of the time, Michael Keller, for the restoration of the original Romanesque west portal provoked an explosion of letters of protest in the Westfälische Nachrichten. These had no effect on the bishop's intentions.

Following a plan by Fritz Thoma, twelve round windows were built in a circle in the west wall, with four further windows arranged in a square inside them. This arrangement was based on the original Romanesque westwerk, with clear influence of 1950s architectural fashions. Scornful names for the sixteen windows circulated among the populace. Thus, they are sometimes called "Keller windows" (in reference to their builder, bishop Keller), "Seelenbrause" (Soul-burst), or "Wählscheibe Gottes" (God's rotary dial).

=== Former rood screen ===
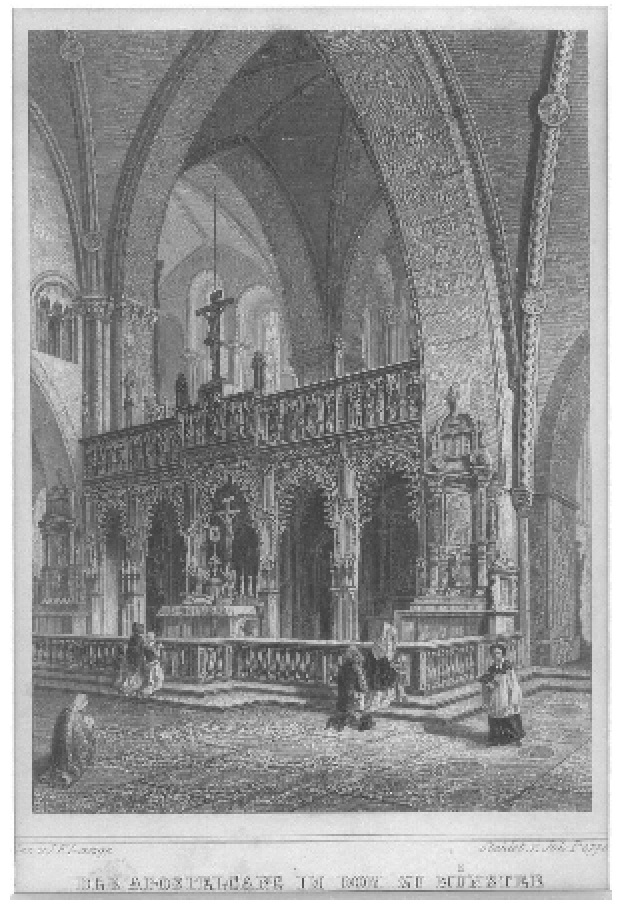
Rood screen (etching, 19th C)

Until the 1870s, the crossing choir was separated from the nave by a large rood screen made of Bamberg limestone, which linked both the western pillars of the crossing (F). The rood screen was made by the brothers Franz and Johann Brabender between 1542 and 1549, to replace the original (Gothic) rood screen from the 13th century, which was destroyed during the Anabaptist rule of Münster.

The rood screen of 1549 was an arcade or hall rood screen. Aside from this screen, the crossing choir was separated from the east transept, i.e. the Stephanus and Johannes choirs, by walls between the northern and southern pillars of the crossing respectively which was almost as high as the screen.

The back wall of the rood screen (facing the high choir) was massive and closed. There were two doors in it, by which clergy could access the nave from the high choir (e.g. for distributing communion). There was a tower containing a stairway at the point where the screen met each of the crossing pillars. They allowed access to the rectangular space on top of the screen, which also appears to have served as a stage for musicians.

The front side (facing the nave) was clearly designed as an arcade. In the middle was the cross-altar, from which the mass was served to the people in the nave. In the railings of the front side were niches containing sculptural figures, including sculptures of the Twelve Apostles in the round. For this reason, the screen was known as the Apostelgang.

In 1870 the screen was demolished. Remains of the screen, including the sculptures can still be seen in the cathedral treasury.

== Architecture ==
During the erection of St. Paulus Dom, most of the preceding (Ottonian) cathedral was demolished with only masonry fragments being retained (apparently in the west transept and the southern side-aisle). The westwerk erected in 1192 (the Old Choir and the two west towers) was incorporated into the current structure.

From the perspective of architectural history, the modern cathedral is divided into two parts: the Romanesque westwerk and the Gothic building.

The letters in parentheses in the following section refer to the ground plan below.

Ground plan of the cathedral today; capital letters = rooms
	Location	Note		Location	Note
A	North tower	(Petrus-Kapelle)	M	Johannes Choir	(Organ)
B	Old Choir	(Former west portal)	N	High choir	
C	South tower	(Katharinen-Kapelle)	O	Maximus-kapelle	(Galensche Kapelle)
D	Northwest transept	(Access to cloisters)	P	Ludgerus-kapelle	(Galensche Kapelle)
E	Southwest transept	(Main entrance)	Q	Josephs-kapelle	(Galensche Kapelle)
F	Paradise		R	Kreuz-kapelle	
G	Nave		S	Ambulatory	
H	Northern side-aisle		T	Chapter hall	
I	Southern side-aisle		U	Cloisters	(Access to cathedral treasury)
J	Sakraments-kapelle	(Former sacristry)	V	Domherren-Friedhof	
K	Stephanus Choir		W	Marien-kapelle	
L	Crossing	(Former rood screen)	X	Sacristry	(Access to chapter hall)

=== Old Choir ===
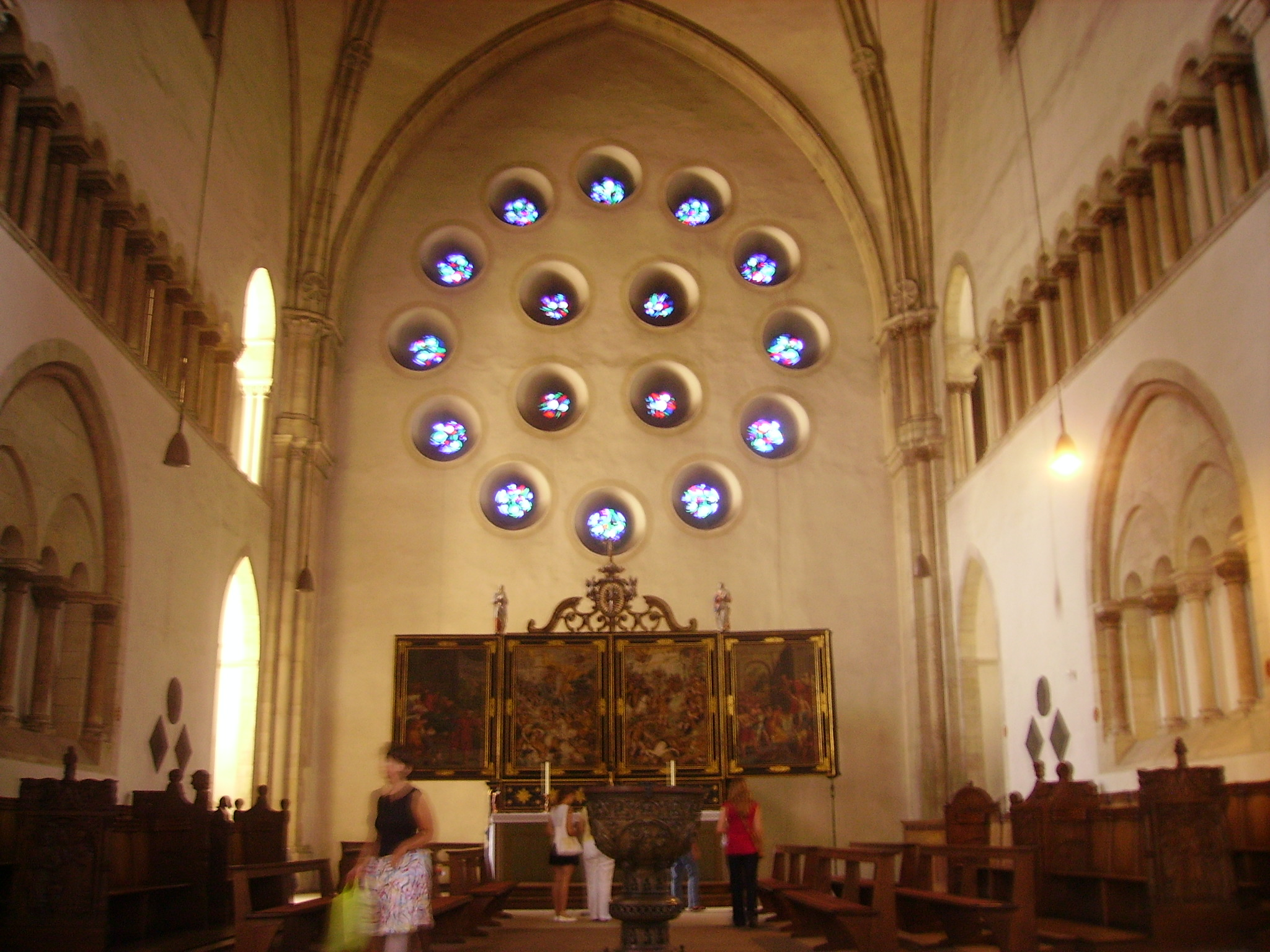
View of the Old Choir with the Baroque high altar

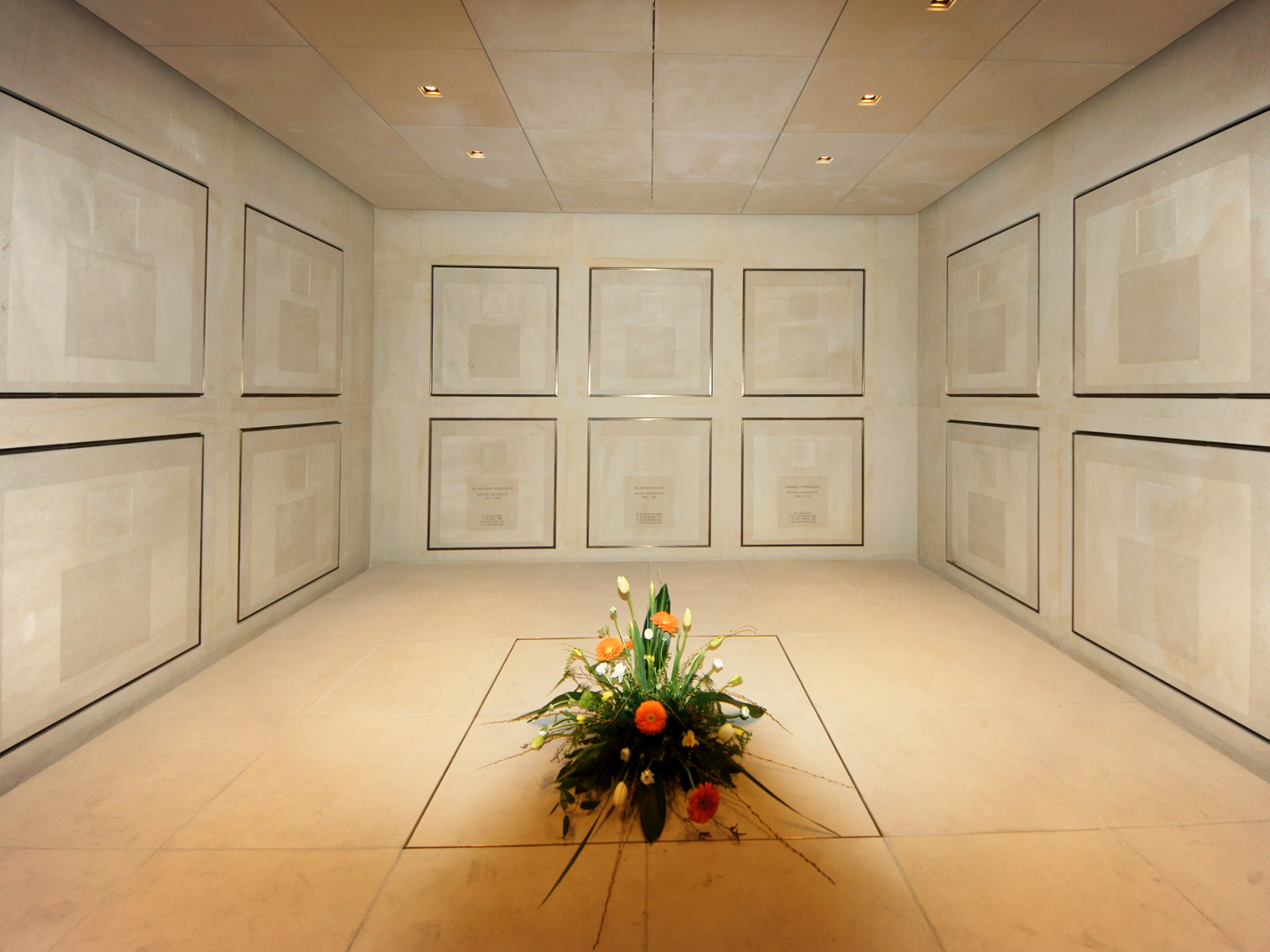
Tombs of the bishops

The "Old Choir" (German: Alte Chor) (B) measures 17.6 m from north to south and 16.9 m from east to west (interior measurements: 12.1 x 13.55 m). It was built as a separate structure on the west side of the Ottonian cathedral and was initially separated from that building by the west exterior wall of the transept. This ceased to be the case around 1250 when the third cathedral was built.

Shortly after the end of the Anabaptist rule in the 1530s, the Old Choir was again separated from the rest of the building, by stand-alone walls and iron gratings. These dividers remained until at least 1870. During this time, in the second quarter of the seventeenth century, the Old Choir was the place where the auxiliary bishop conducted confirmation and ordination.

In 1836, the Old Choir was renovated and refurnished thanks to a donation by the Bursars of Landsberg. In this context, a large organ was installed in the Old Choir, as well as iron railings in front of the lower chapels in the two towers, decorated with the dedication "v. Landsberg" in cursive letters. The Old Choir remained a separate room after this. The Landsberg furnishings of the Old Choir were already mostly gone in 1856.

In the course of the restorations after the Second World War, the Old Choir was opened to the west transept completely. The Baroque high altar was installed next to the baptistry with fonts which was already there in the eighteenth century, under the circular rosette window built in the west wall at this time.

The tombs of the bishops are located under the Old Choir. Among others, Johannes Poggenburg, Michael Keller, Heinrich Tenhumberg and Reinhard Lettmann are buried here. For a long time these tombs could only be accessed through an opening in the floor of the Old Choir, but during the restorations of 2011–2012, the tombs were made into a crypt accessible to visitors.

=== Towers ===
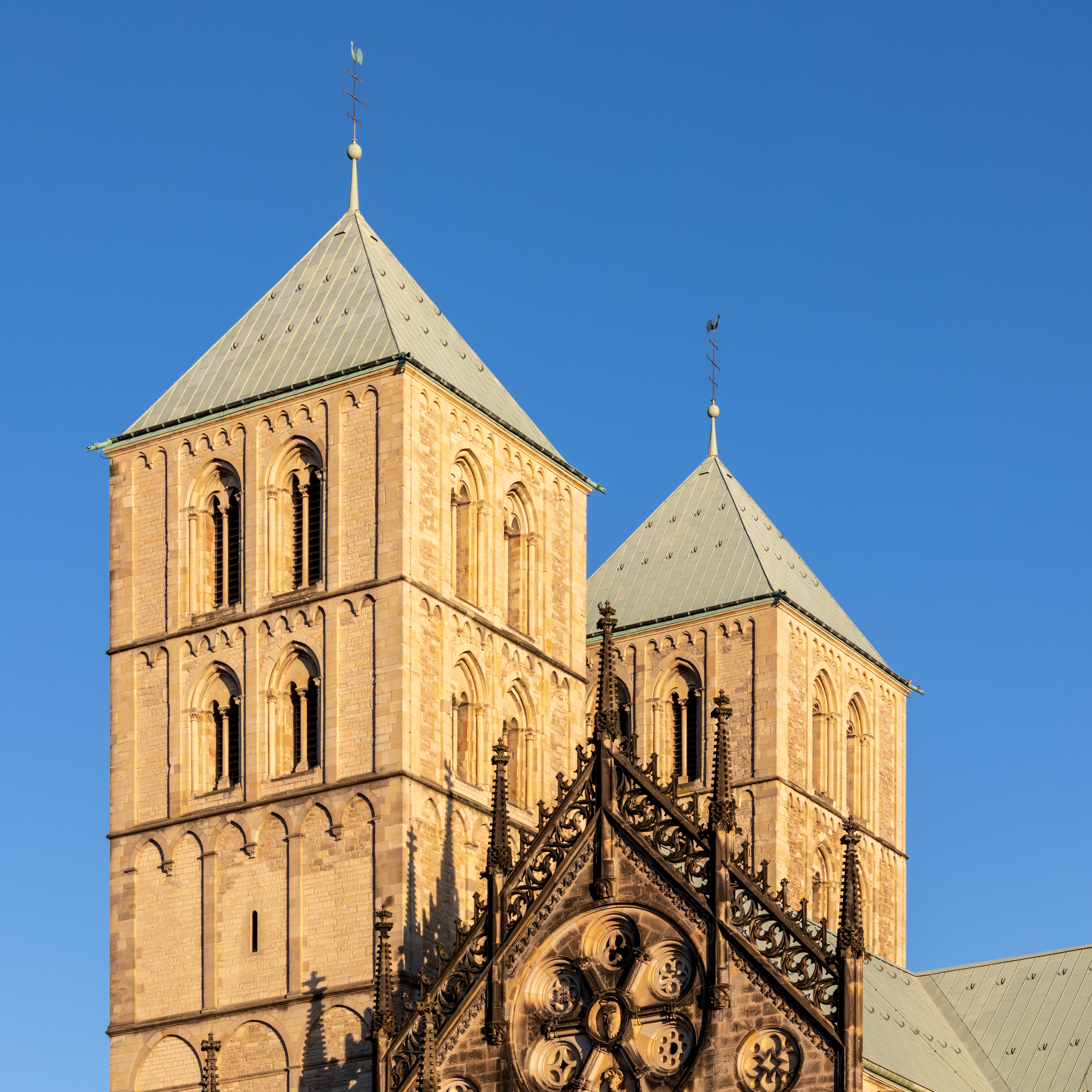
Spires in detail. South tower at left.

The two Romanesque west towers appear identical at first sight. The roofs of the towers are shaped like pyramids and clad in copper (since 1725). However, this does not appear to have been their original form. Before the Anabaptist rule in 1534–1535, the spires seem to have been clad in lead and were clearly higher – the Anabaptists threw down the spires, just as they did to the tower of the Überwasserkirche.

==== Exterior differences ====
Measurements
	North tower	South tower
Length (north–south)	12.05 m	11.5 m
Length (west–east)	13.6 m	12.95 m
Height	57.7 m	55.5 m

Despite their identical external appearance, the towers are clearly different sizes. Compared to the north tower (A), the south tower (C) is somewhat smaller and shorter.

On the other hand, the walls of the lower three stories of the north tower are narrower than those of the south tower. This is clear since the chapel on the ground floor of the south tower is manifestly smaller than the chapel on the ground floor of the north tower. This large difference in the lower levels makes it clear that the respective ground floor chapels are meant to be aligned with the side-aisles. Since their ground plan derives from the second, Ottonian cathedral, adjustments had to be made to the towers in order to incorporate them into the third and current cathedral. To compensate for this obvious asymmetry, they near the same size in their upper portions.

In addition, the two towers are similar in their dimensions. Until the restoration of the north tower after a partial collapse during World War II, the difference in roof level was only 25 centimetres.

==== Interior ====
Inside the towers there are two chapels, one on top of the other. The two chapels on the ground floor (already mentioned) are the Katharinenkapelle (south tower) and the Petruskapelle (north tower), which are accessed from the west transept.

The upstairs chapels do not have altars. They are reached by vaulted stone stairs, which lead from the west transept to the corner in the outer walls of the towers. Because of the thickness of the walls of the north tower, the stairs in this tower are completely within the walls. In the south tower they visibly extend into the interior. This form of stair system was a significant and influential model for many Westphalian church buildings.

There are doors in the upper chapels leading to the walkways behind the column galleries of the Old Choir. Above these walkways, the two towers are connected with each other. The stairs lead into rooms above the tower chapels. There are 54-centimetre-wide (21 in) slit windows in their western exterior walls. From this room, wooden stairs and ladders lead up into the top four levels of the two towers. They can be discerned from the outside from their windows and vault structures and begin 18.37 m above the ground. Niches are formed by ashlar lesenes, but they are not identical on each side of the tower. On the west faces there are four niches formed by five lesenes. On the north side of the north tower and the south side of the south tower on both levels there are only four lesenes. On the uppermost levels on both towers are two pointed arches containing pointed windows. On the north tower there are three of these arches one inside the other; on the south tower only two.

==== North tower ====
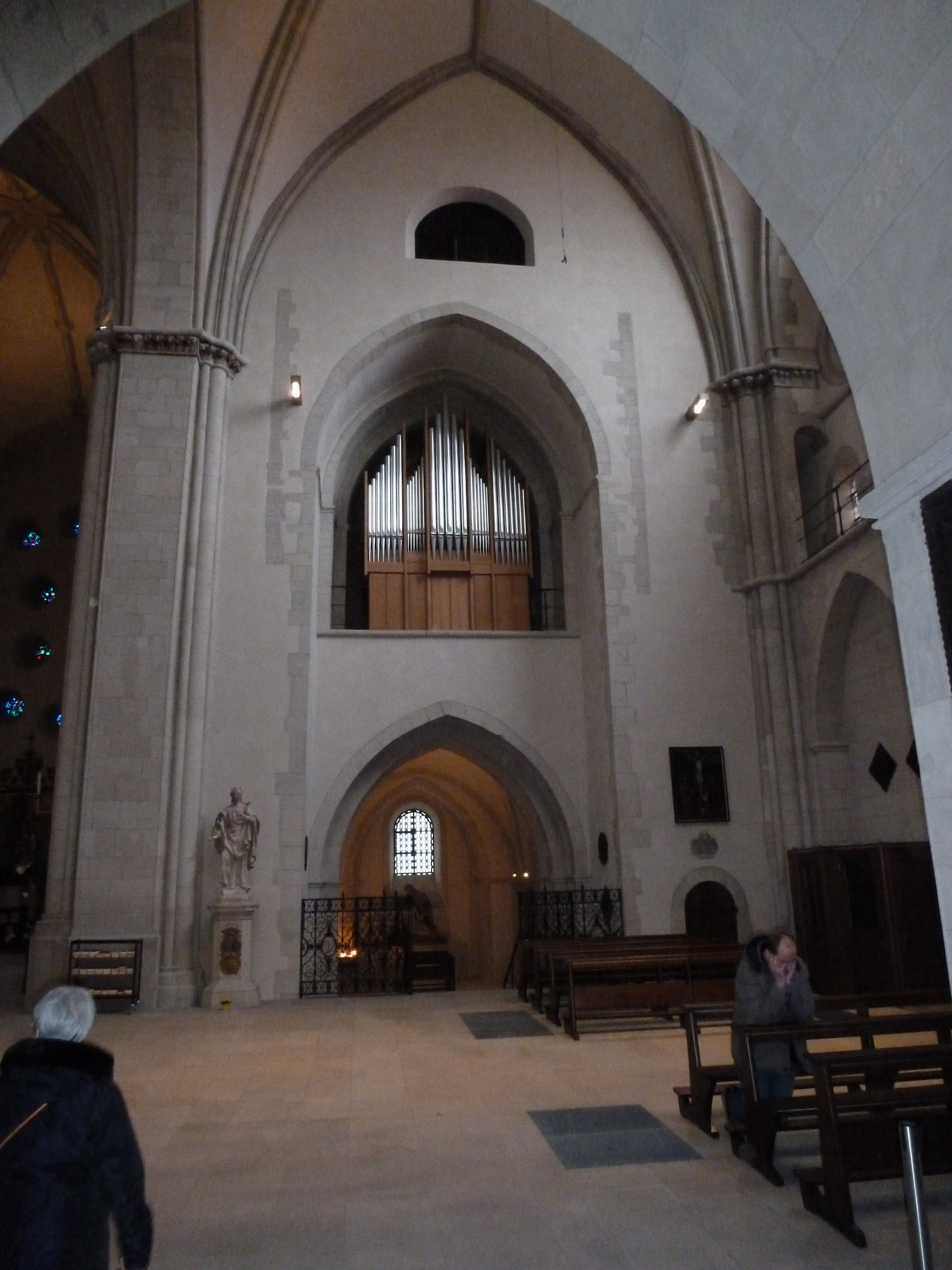
Lower chapel of north tower, upper chapel with organ

The lower chapel of the north tower is dedicated to St Peter and is 75 cm below the floor level of the west transept and the rest of the cathedral. It was probably home to the treasury chamber from the fourteenth century. For this reason, the access from the west transept was only through two doors – the south door led through a short passage to the chapel itself, while the north door led to the treasury chamber which was probably inside the masonry of the walls.

From the fifteenth century, the north tower was also the armarium, the storage space for the holy scriptures. It retained this function until 1 March 1859, when the cathedral chapter ordered the construction of a dividing wall between the chapel and the transept. From 21 November 1793 until 27 March 1794, the tower held not only the cathedral treasury, but also Cologne cathedral treasury, which was brought to Münster for protection from the French during the War of the First Coalition.

After a decision on 21 December 1870, the baptismal font was moved into the Petruskapelle. Along with this, it was closed off with the Landsberg iron grills, which had previously separated off the organ within the Old Choir.

A special feature of the tower is found high up in the upper chapel. In a small chamber, there is a 0.8 m high and 1.4 m wide gravestone showing a woman in prayer. It was apparently already old before the construction of the Westwerk in 1190, since there was no hesitation at recycling it as building material for the cathedral.

The north tower was badly damaged in the Second World War; the upper two levels were partially destroyed. During the restoration, the aforementioned levels and the roof were rebuilt. At the same time, the interior of the tower was renovated and the Petruskapelle made into the treasury chamber once more. After the completion of the new treasury chamber to the north of the cloisters in 1981, the treasury was moved there.

In the "upper" chapel are the auxiliary works of the main organ.

==== South tower ====
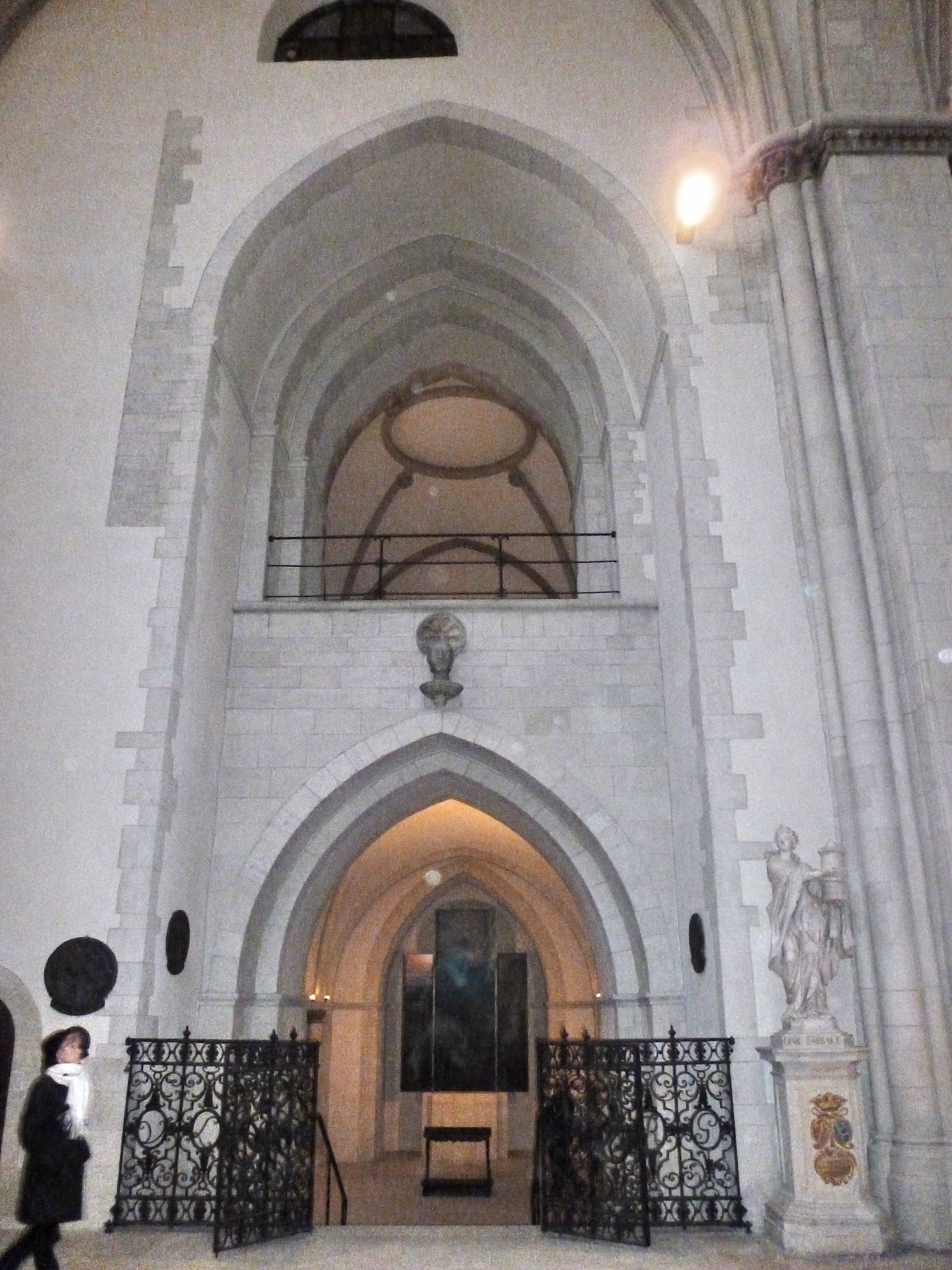
south tower: Upper and lower chapels (with opening to the belfry)

Since the beginning of the 17th century, the lower chapel of the south tower, the Katharinenkapelle has contained the "Heilige Grab" (Holy grave). On 31 January 1685 it was decided to convert this into a permanent tomb. To do this, it was necessary to remove the altar and transfer the mass to the primaltar. After the death of the deacon at the time, Johann Rotgar, who had been a leading force in the conversion of the chapel, his two grave stones were placed in the chapel.

From 1935 the room served as a memorial chapel for those "fallen in war and labour" („Gefallenen des Krieges und der Arbeit“) and was equipped with a new altar and altar cross. A restored wrought iron hanger from the 17th century held a commemorative flame, while the room was further decorated with a late gothic table and two stone angels.

After the south tower was burnt in the Second World War, damage to the exterior walls was repaired and both chapels were renovated. Thereafter the Katharinenkapelle served as a baptistry for a long time until it was rearranged with the addition of an altar with the triptych "Piety and Resurrection" ("Pietá und Auferstehung") on 7 November 2003.

=== Paradise ===
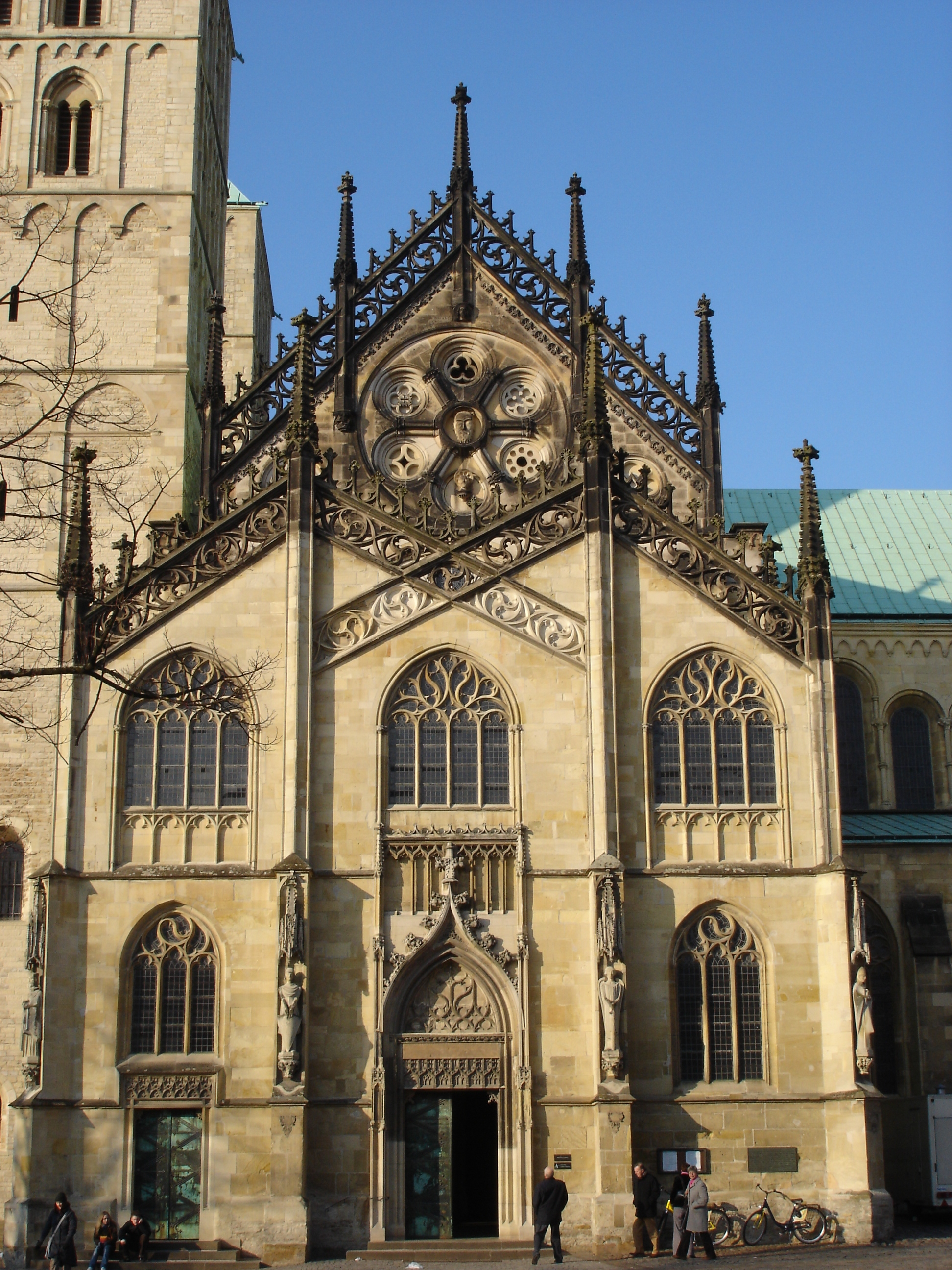
Exterior view of the paradise

The "Paradise" (F, German: Paradies) is a two-story forehall or narthex (originally three stories) on the south side of the west transept. It measures 5.83 metres from north to south and 14.92 metres from east to west. On account of the remains of masonry in the transept it is assumed that the narthex of the Ottonian cathedral was in the same location.

The Paradise was originally open to the south, since it was used for the Sendgericht and the Hofgericht courts which the Sachsenspiegel required to be held under an open sky. Court cases were moved to the City Hall after its construction in 1395 and the south wall of the paradise must have been closed up some time after this.

Inside the Paradise, there is a 69-centimetre-high (27 in) bevelled edge running around all four walls. A 21-centimetre-high (8.3 in) frieze of vine tendrils runs around the walls 2.04 metres above the ground. This frieze is decorated with small sculptures of people and animals. The oldest of these is probably the winding dragon at the north end of the east wall. At the east end of the north wall are three sculptures and a corner pillar decorated with ten identical palmettes. Under the window of the east wall are depictions of the seasonal work of each month of the year. on the west part of the north wall, King David is depicted with his musicians; the pillar in the northwest corner of the room shows a rabbit hunt and a grape harvest. Below the window on the west side, was a hexameter concerning Mary Magdalen until the renovation of the cathedral in 1880, when it was replaced by small figures of the builders and stonemasons. At this time it was not unusual for unworked stones to be installed in walls and slowly elaborated into a frieze over a long period of time.

Above the frieze are more-than-life-size stone statues of the twelve apostles, with saints and donors. The current form of these is not the original arrangement. For example, two figures were moved from next to the east window to the right side of the portal in the north wall and a niche in the east wall was filled with a statue of John the Baptist, originally from Metelen. The space between the two doors of the portal in the north wall is decorated with a statue of Jesus Christ as Salvator Mundi. The original composition of the statuary is not clear because of the destruction carried out by the Anabaptists, but it is believed that they reflected a unified plan. Because of their age – the figures were created in the 13th century – not all of them can be clearly identified, since the identification of figures using attributes only became the norm in the Late Gothic period (14th–15th century).

The installation of the figures in niches in the walls has inspired the idea that a different layout was originally intended. The basis of this idea is the fact that the figures are taller than the capitals of the hall's main columns and small columns separating the individual figures are divided at what would have been half their height if they had been the same height as the main columns. Thus, the composition's plan was probably altered during construction and the height of the statues increased in order to make them more prominent.

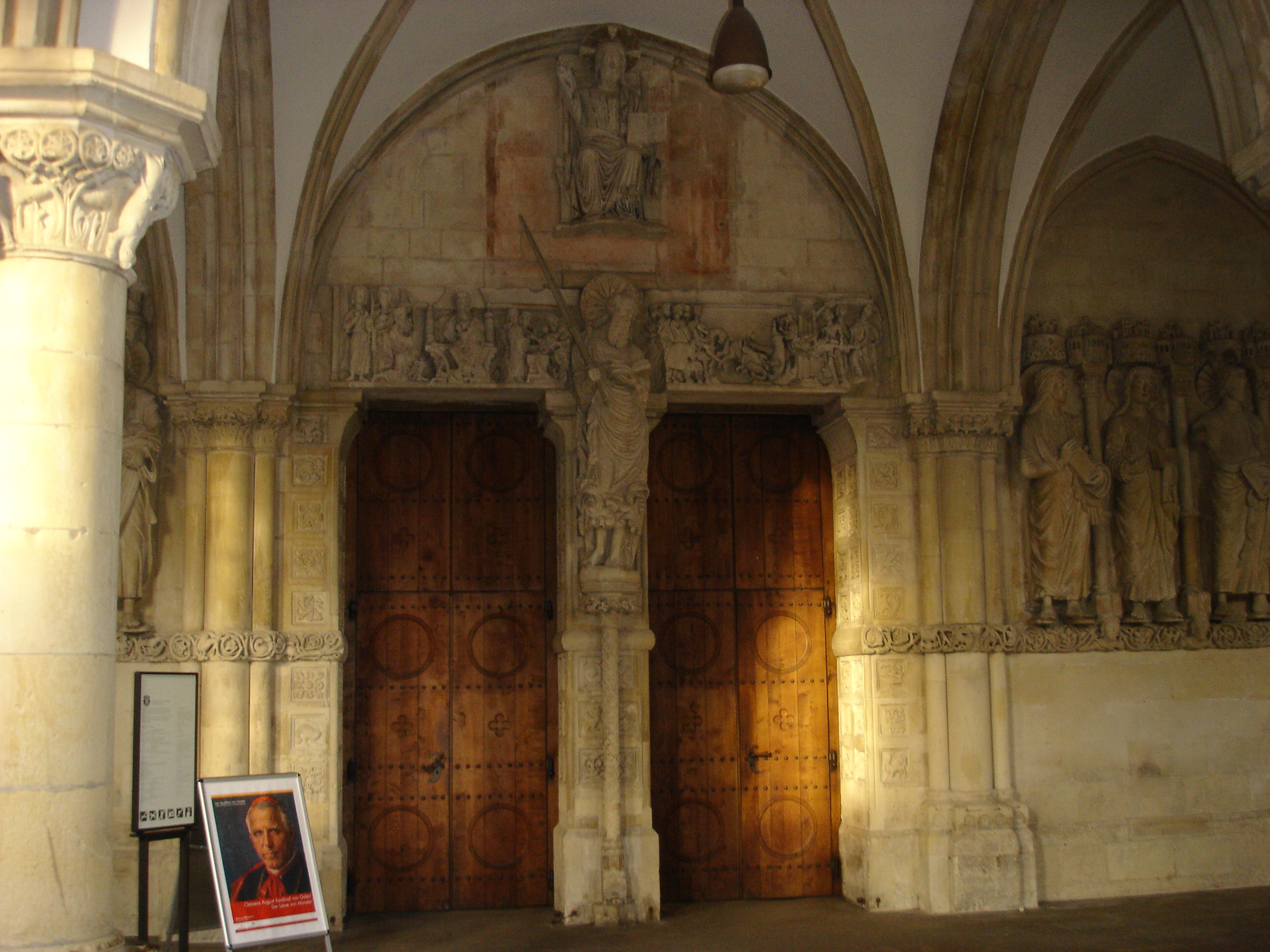
Interior of the Paradise narthex with the north portal

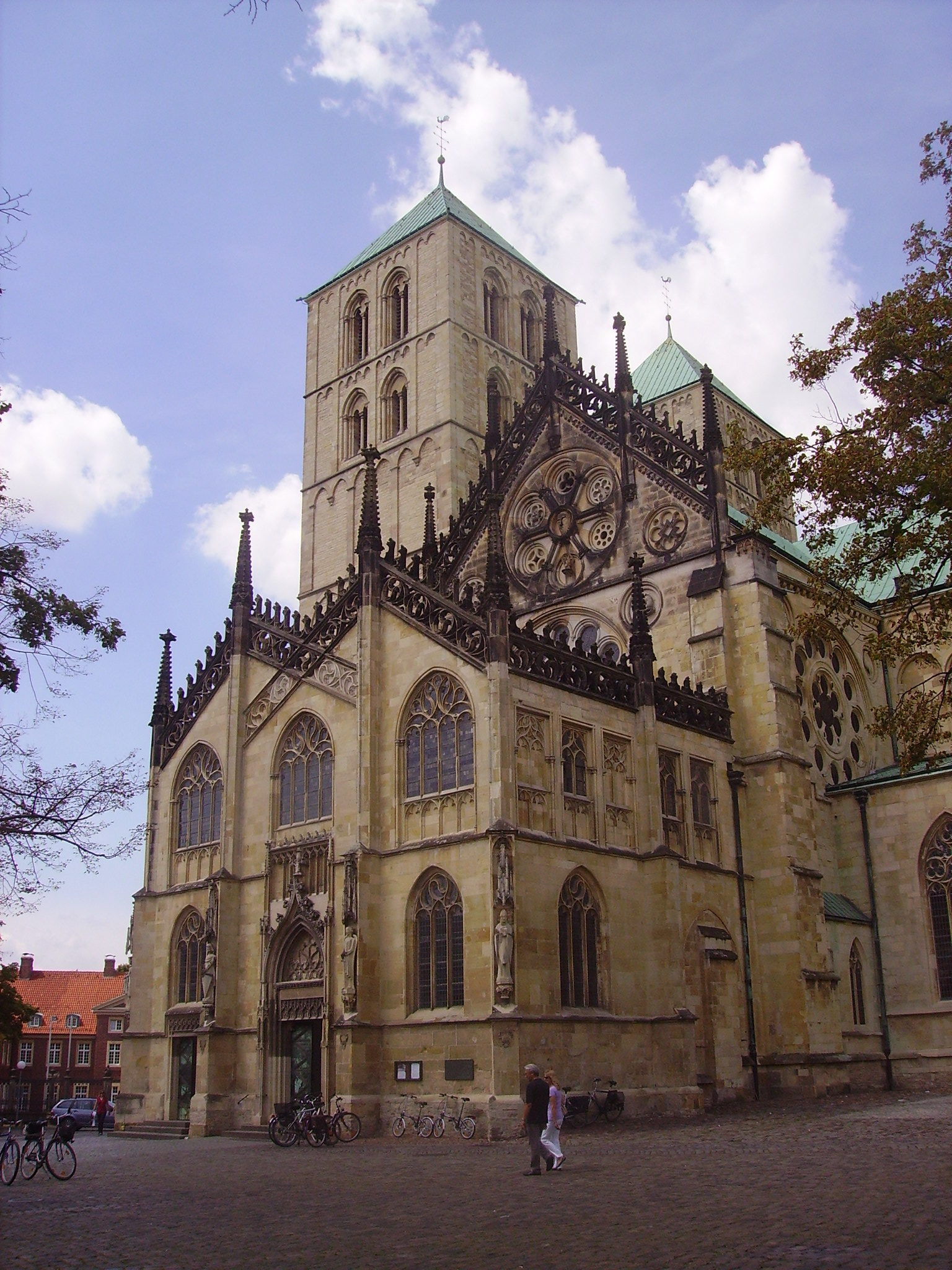
West transept with the paradise narthex

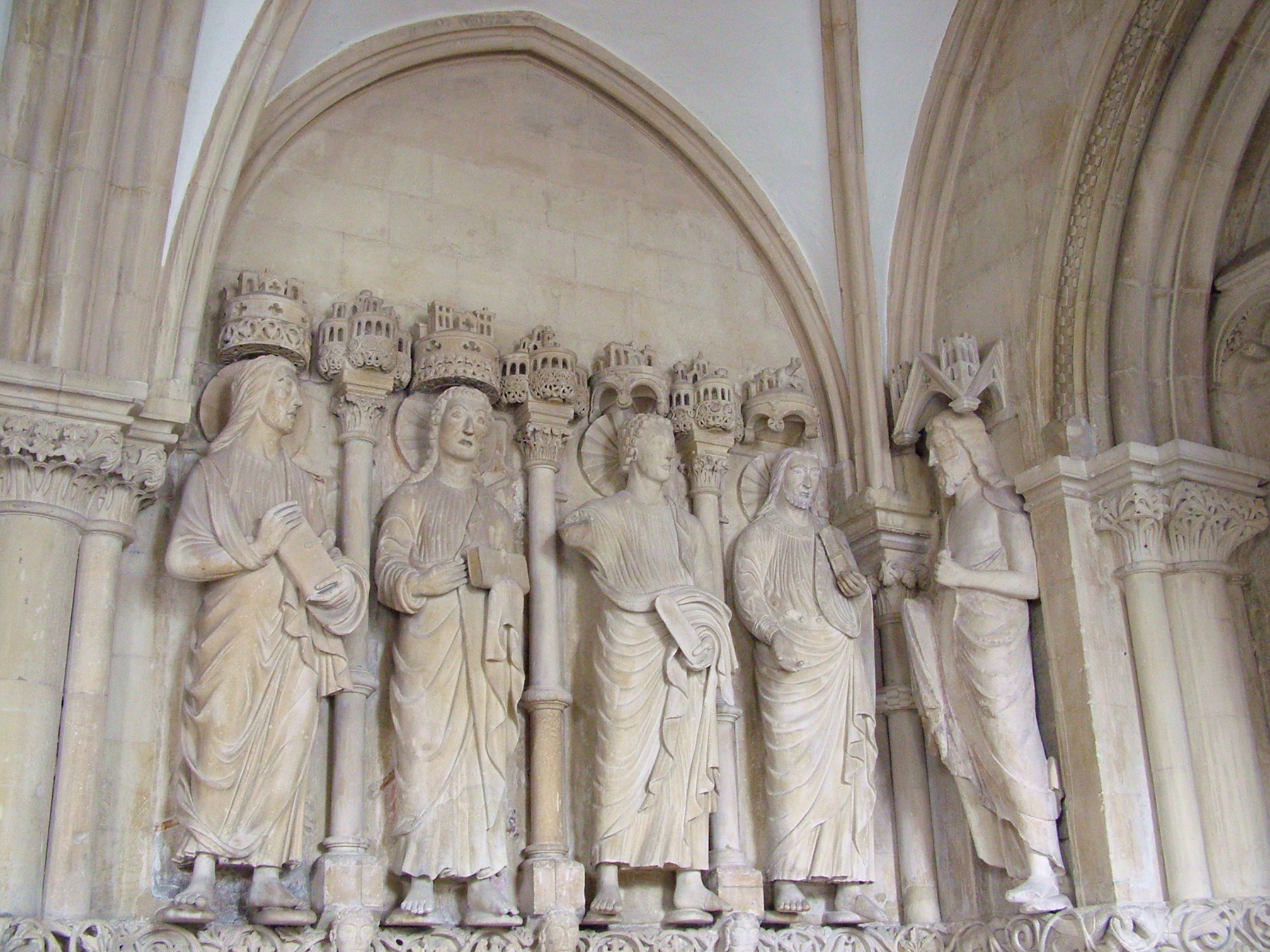
Detail: Statues in the Paradise

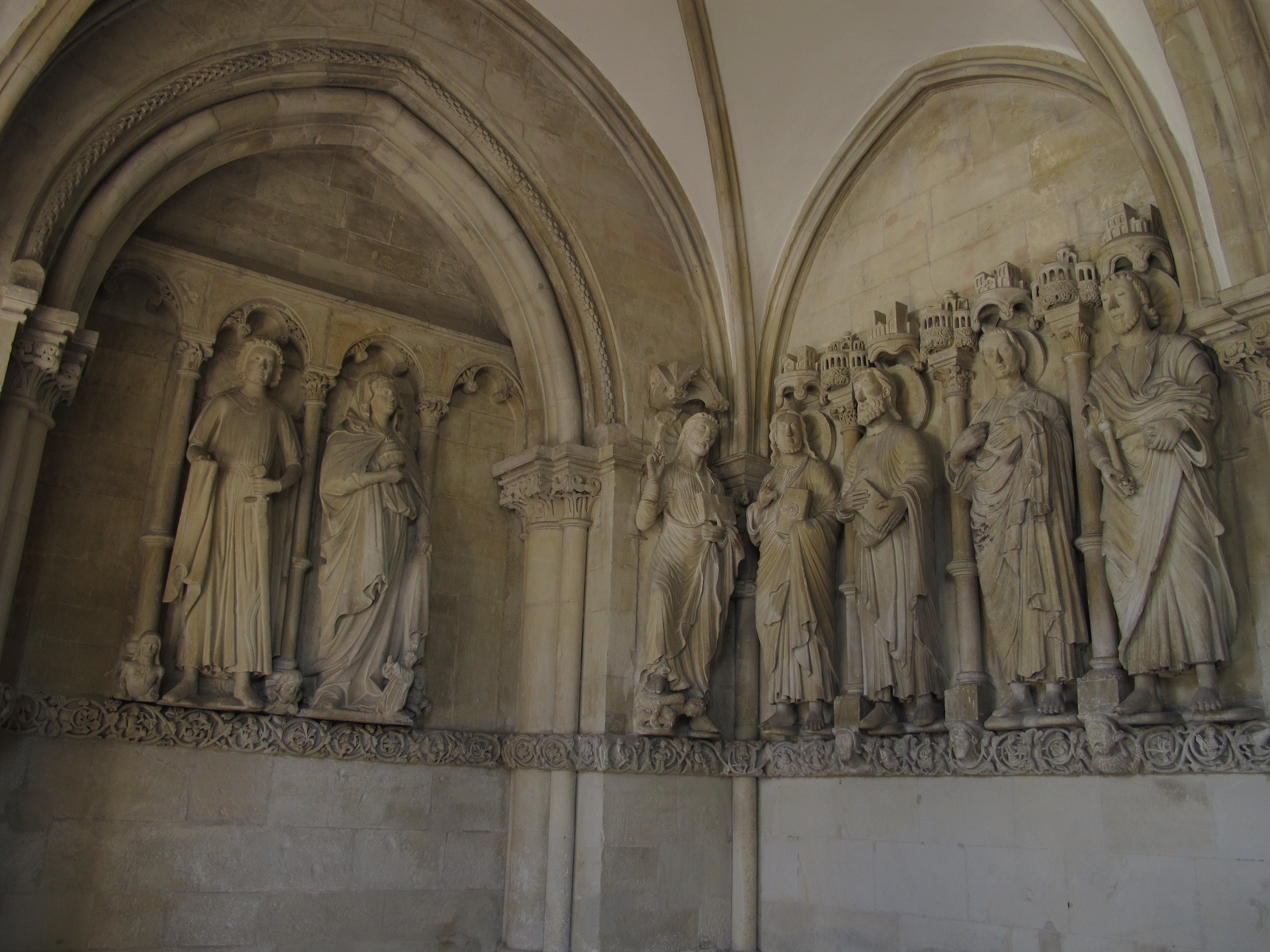
Detail: Statues in the Paradise

=== Nave ===
The nave (G) connects the Westwerk, Old Choir (B), west transept (D and E) and towers (A and C) with the east transept, the altar below the crossing (L) and the choir (N).

==== Sakramentskapelle ====
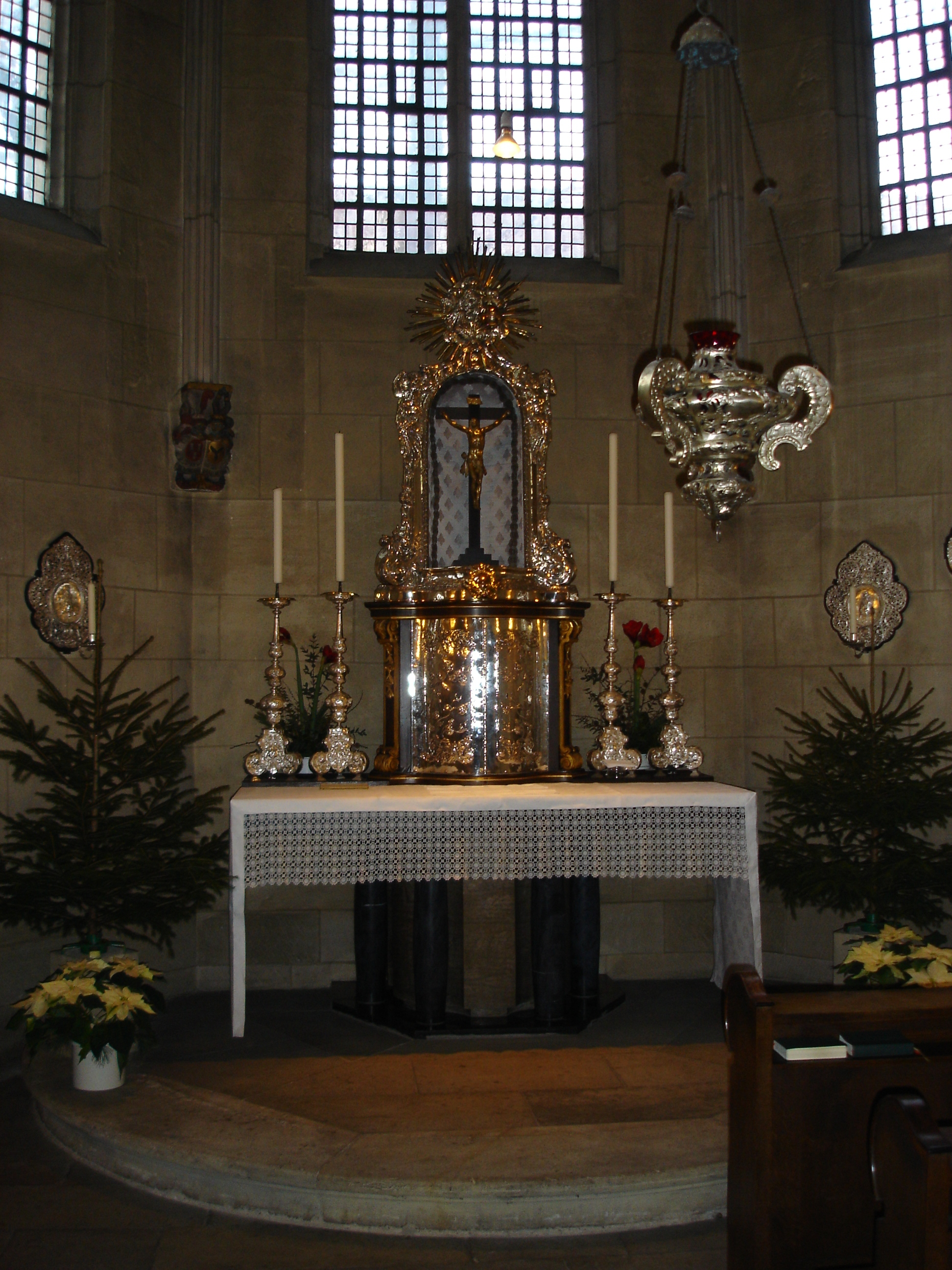
View into the Sakramentskapelle

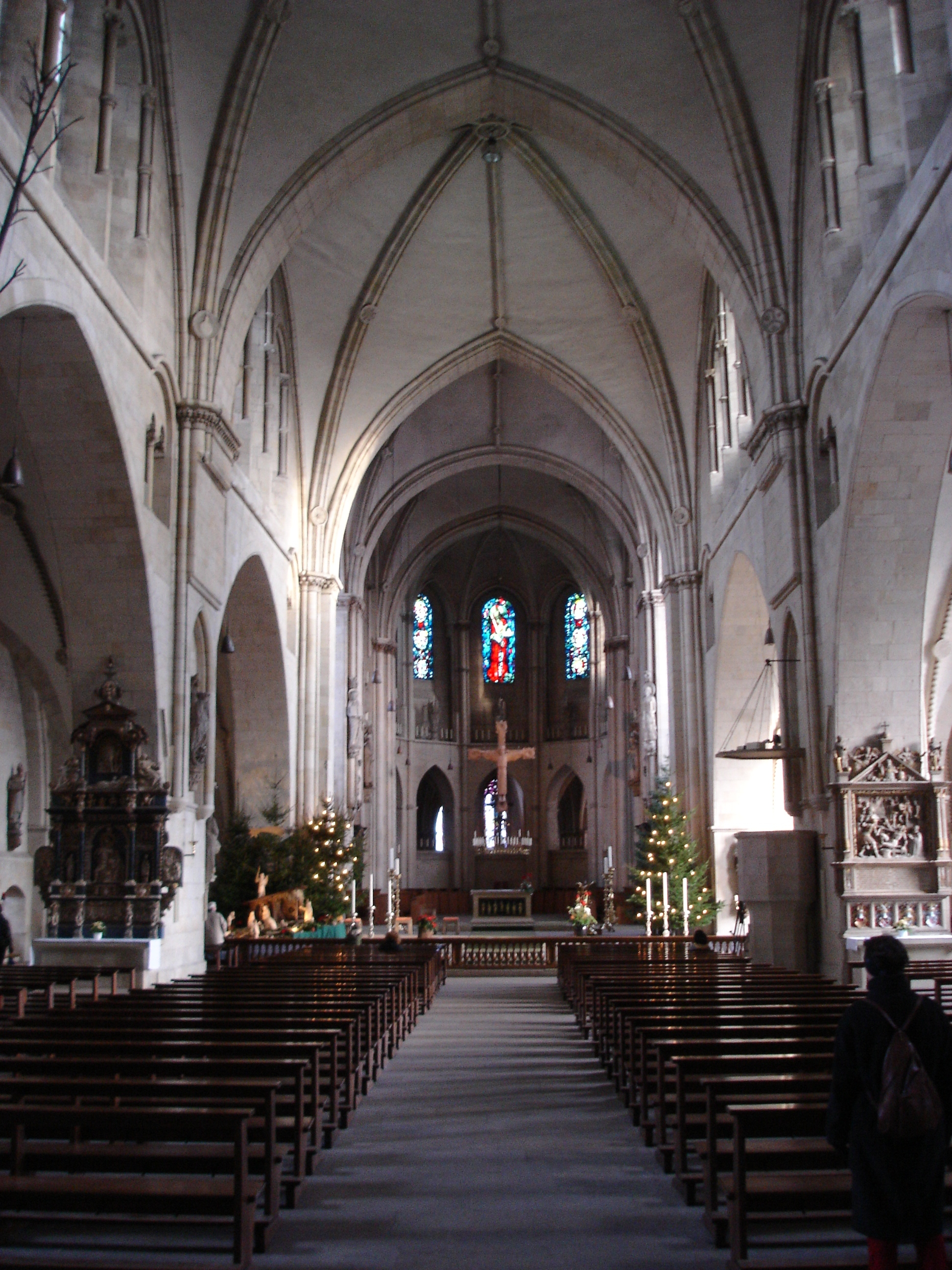
View up the nave towards the choir

A passage off the north side-aisle leads through a notable seventeenth-century bronze door to the Sakramentskapelle (J).

The Sakramentskapelle was built as an annexe behind the Stephanuschor at the end of the seventeenth or beginning of the eighteenth century. It served as a sacristry at first, then as the treasury chamber from 1930, and finally in 1956 it was consecrated as a chapel.

Only the bronze door remains of the original furnishings. This is a cast bronze door which is 2.1 m high and 1.12 m wide. It was cast by Johann Mauritz Gröninger.

==== Images ====
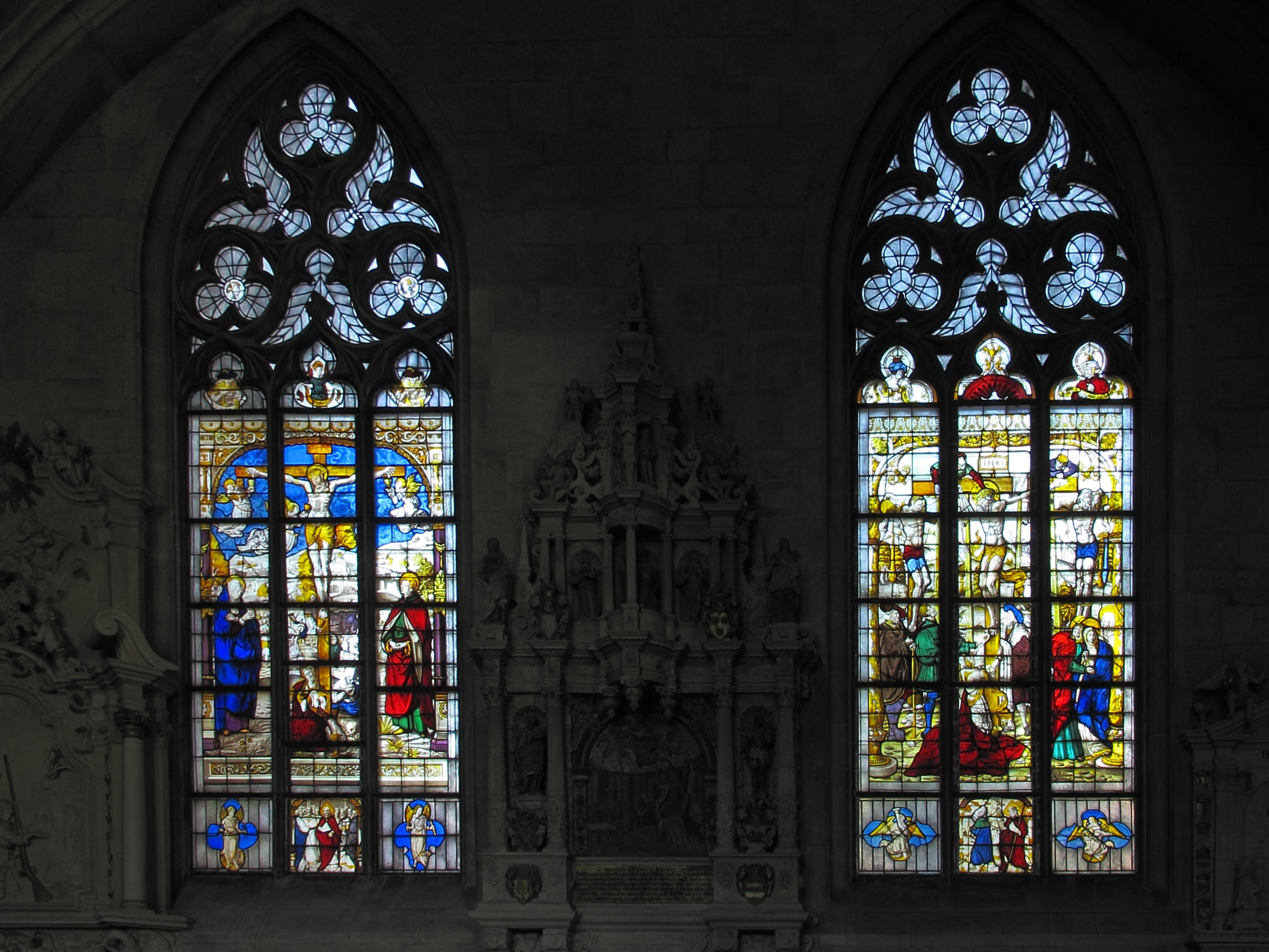
Glass windows in the northern side aisle, originally from the cloisters of Marienfeld Abbey.

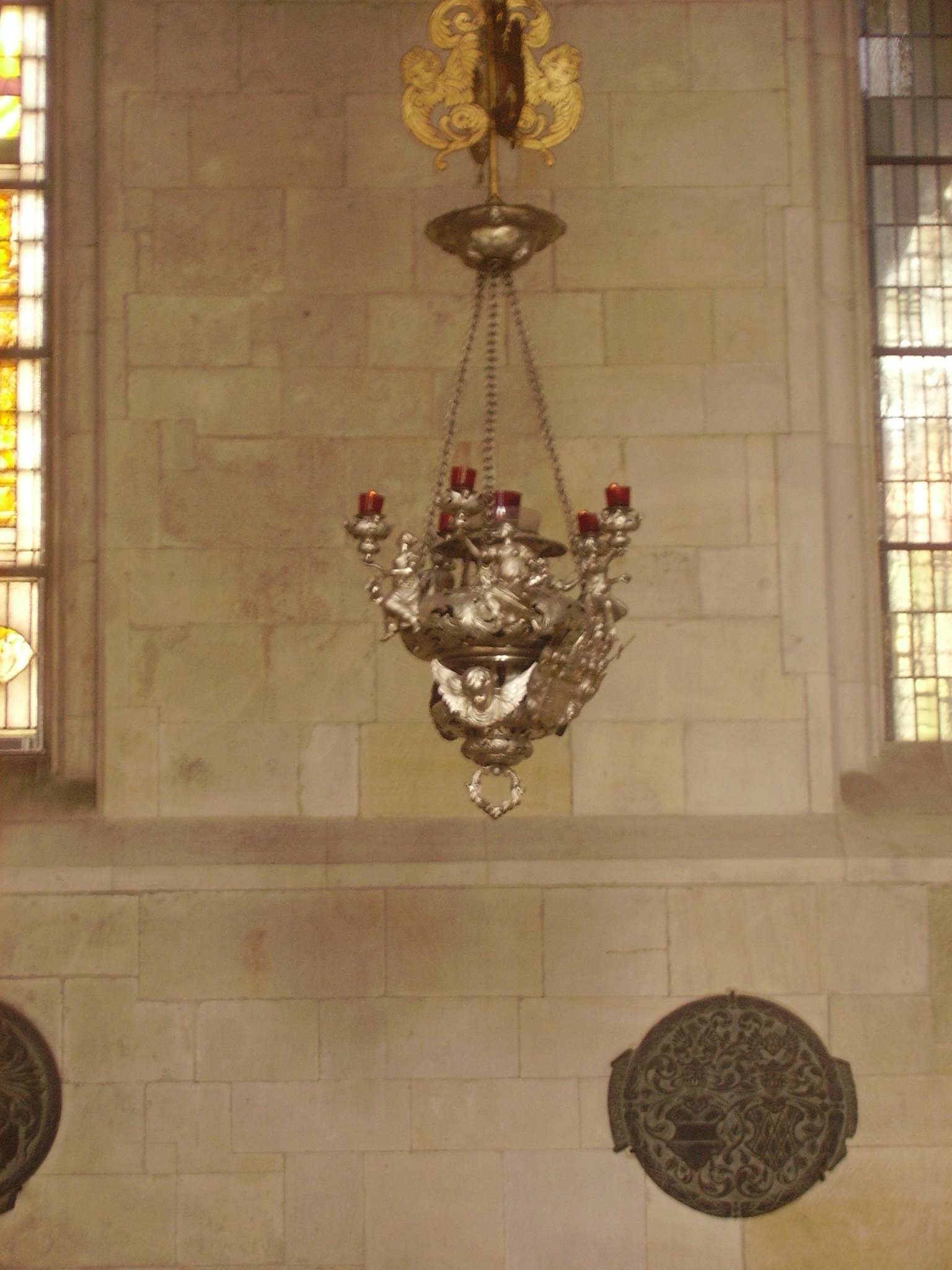
Censer/Eternal flame (in front of the Sakramentskapelle)

=== East transept and high choir ===
The choir area was originally separated from the rest of the cathedral by a rood screen and side barriers, almost a small building within the cathedral building.

This separation is no longer present: under the crossing is the altar island, which protrudes slightly into the nave at the western end. It was (re)designed by the artist Emil Stephan in 1956, along with the choir and the apse, where the bishop's throne is located. The Baroque high altar was removed from the apse. The current high altar is made of sandstone. It supports vitrines, displaying 14th century statues of the apostles from the reliquary-shrine of the old Baroque high altar.

The altar island is next to the choir space and is marked off from the nave by a suspended wooden crucifix (the Triumphal cross) and by the two arms of the east transept.

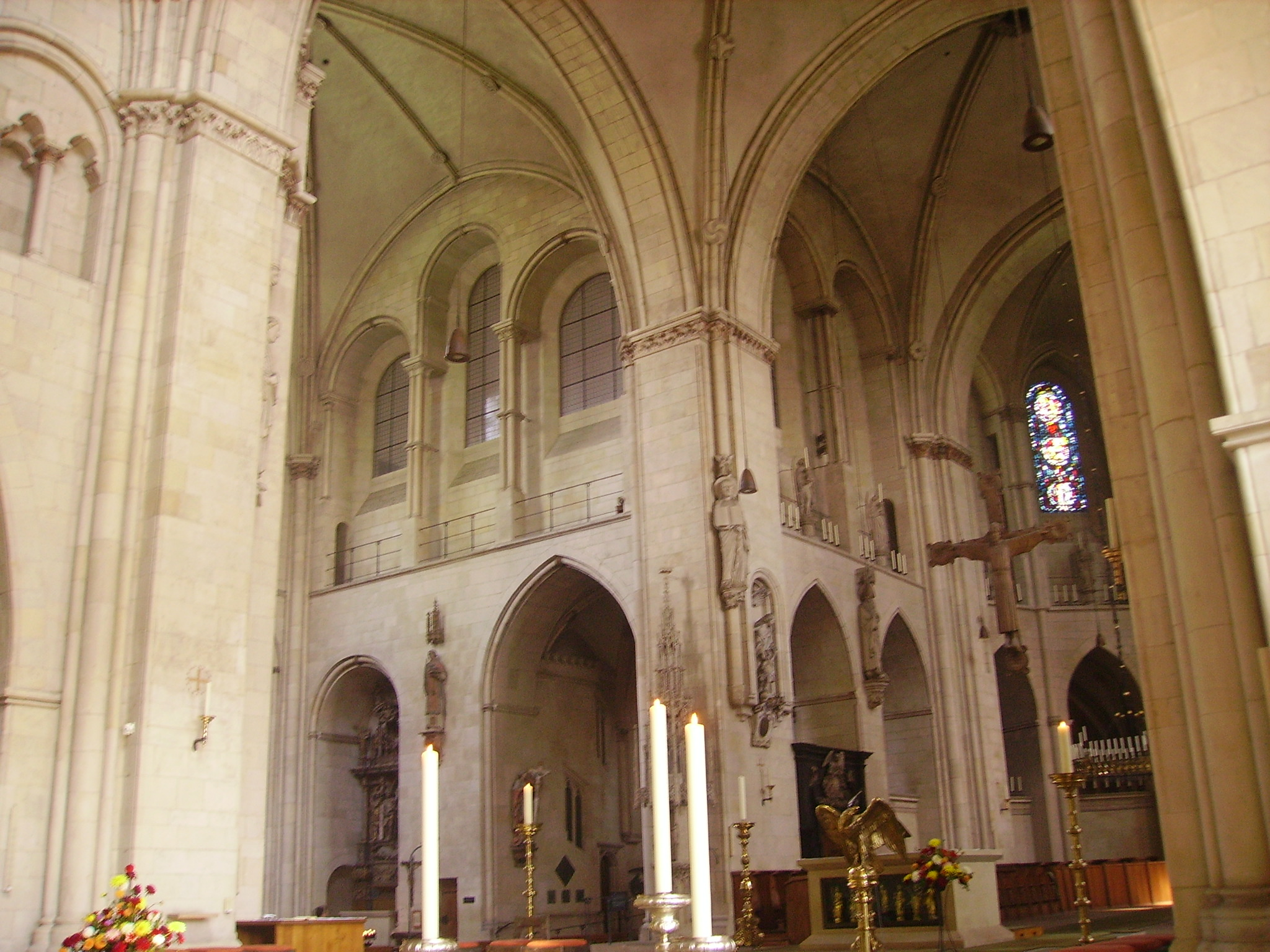
View from the Stephanus-Chor (north arm of the east transept)

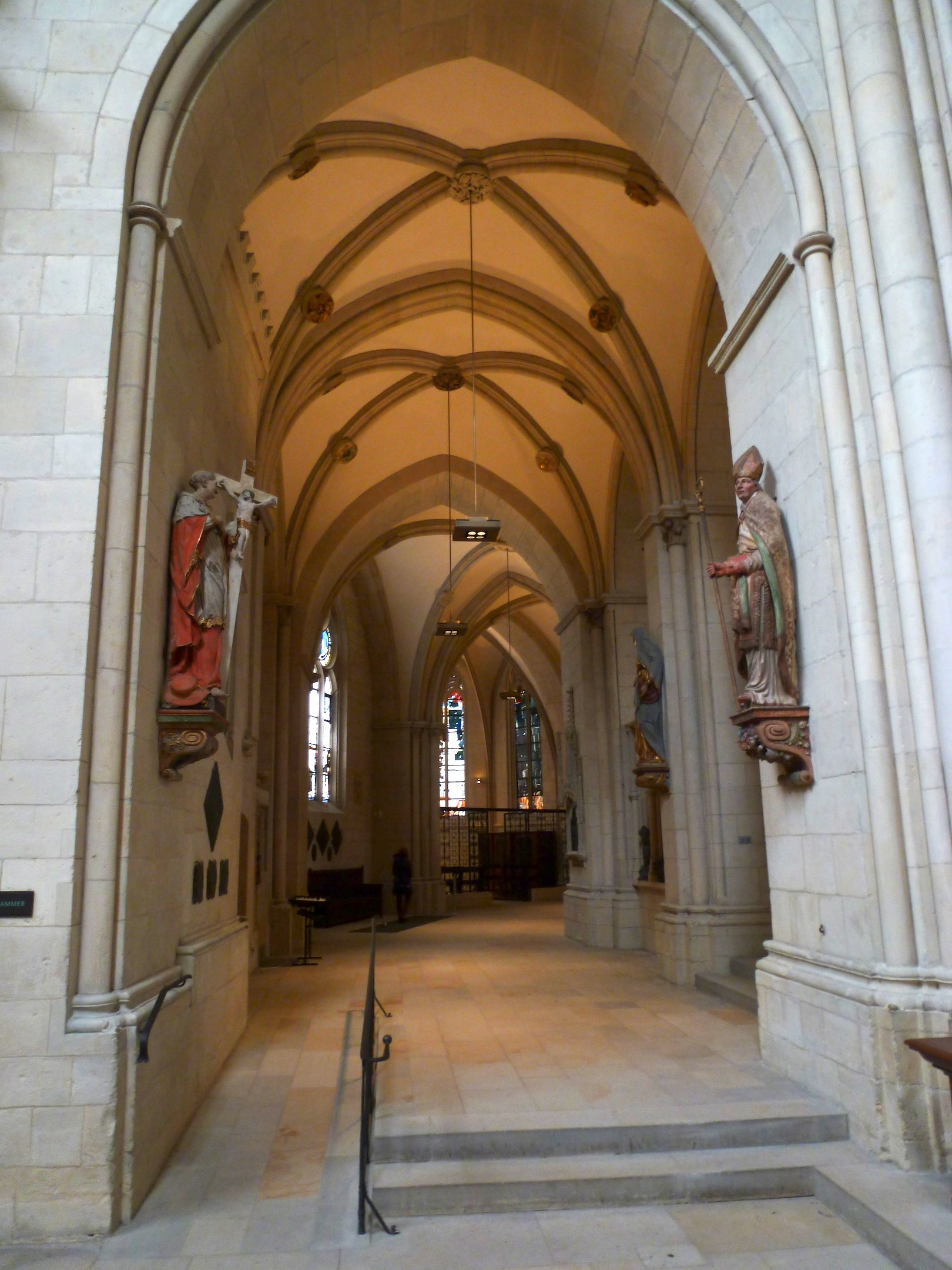
View into the northern ambulatory

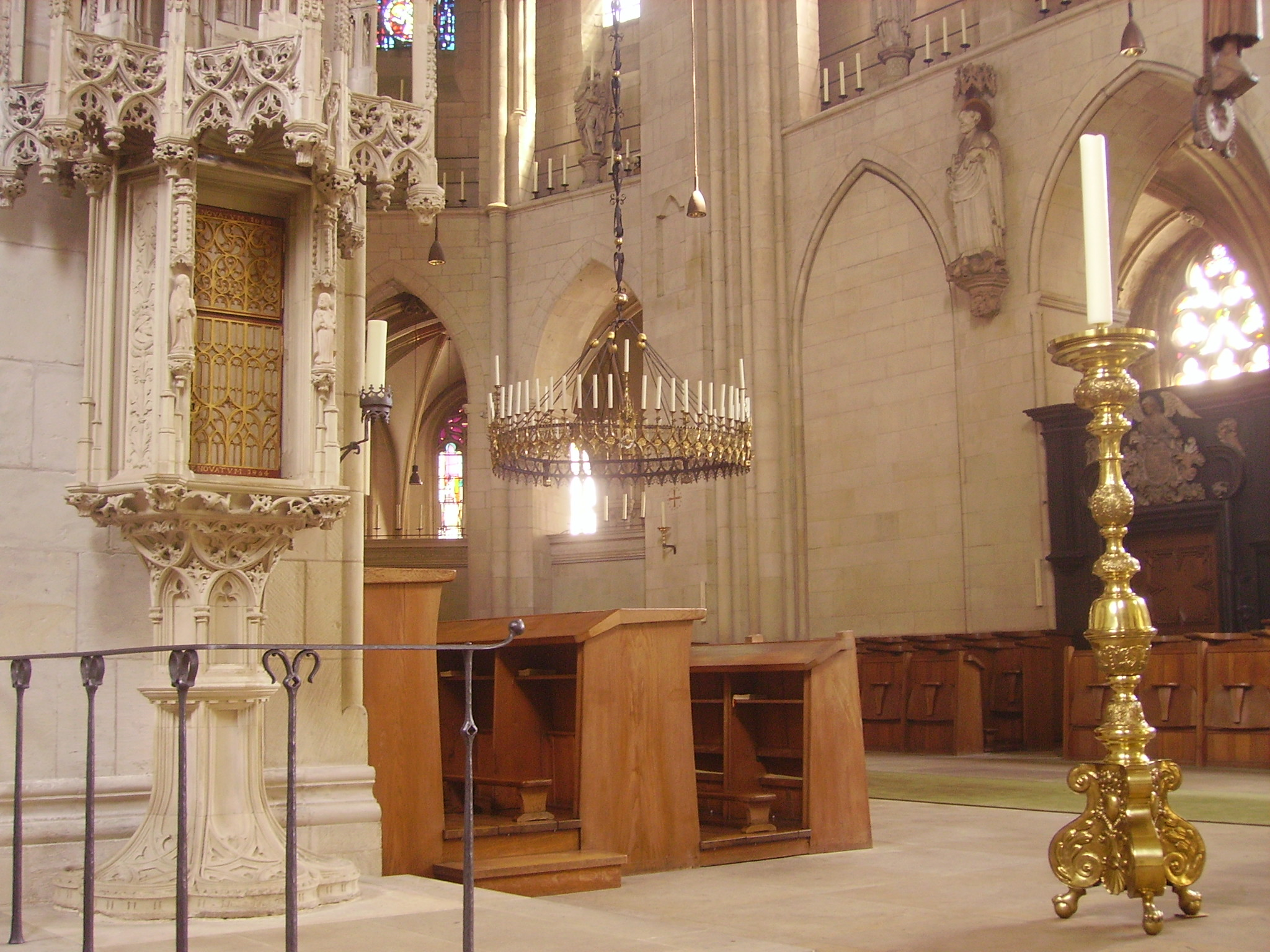
Furnishings of the altar and choir space

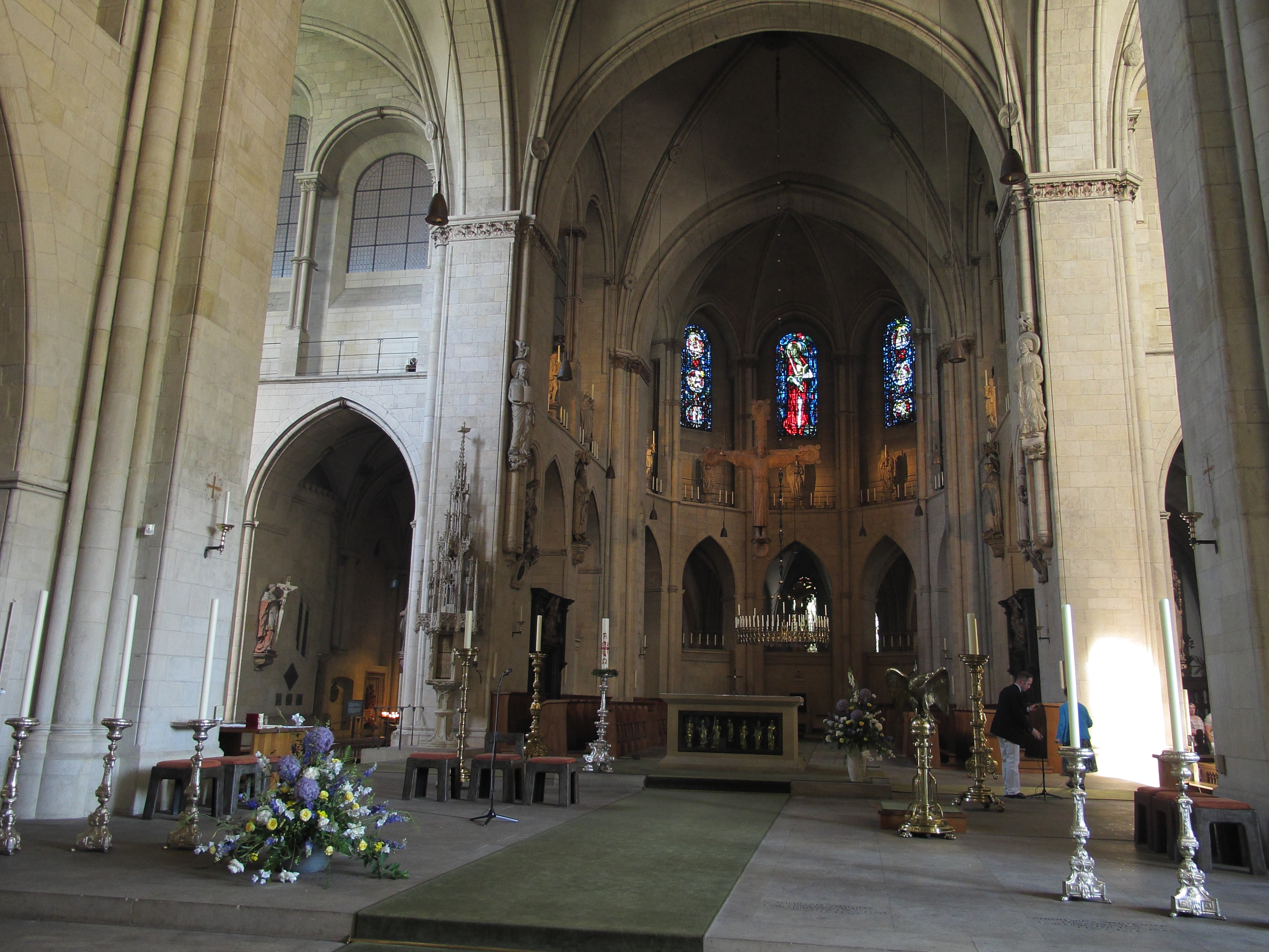
View into the choir

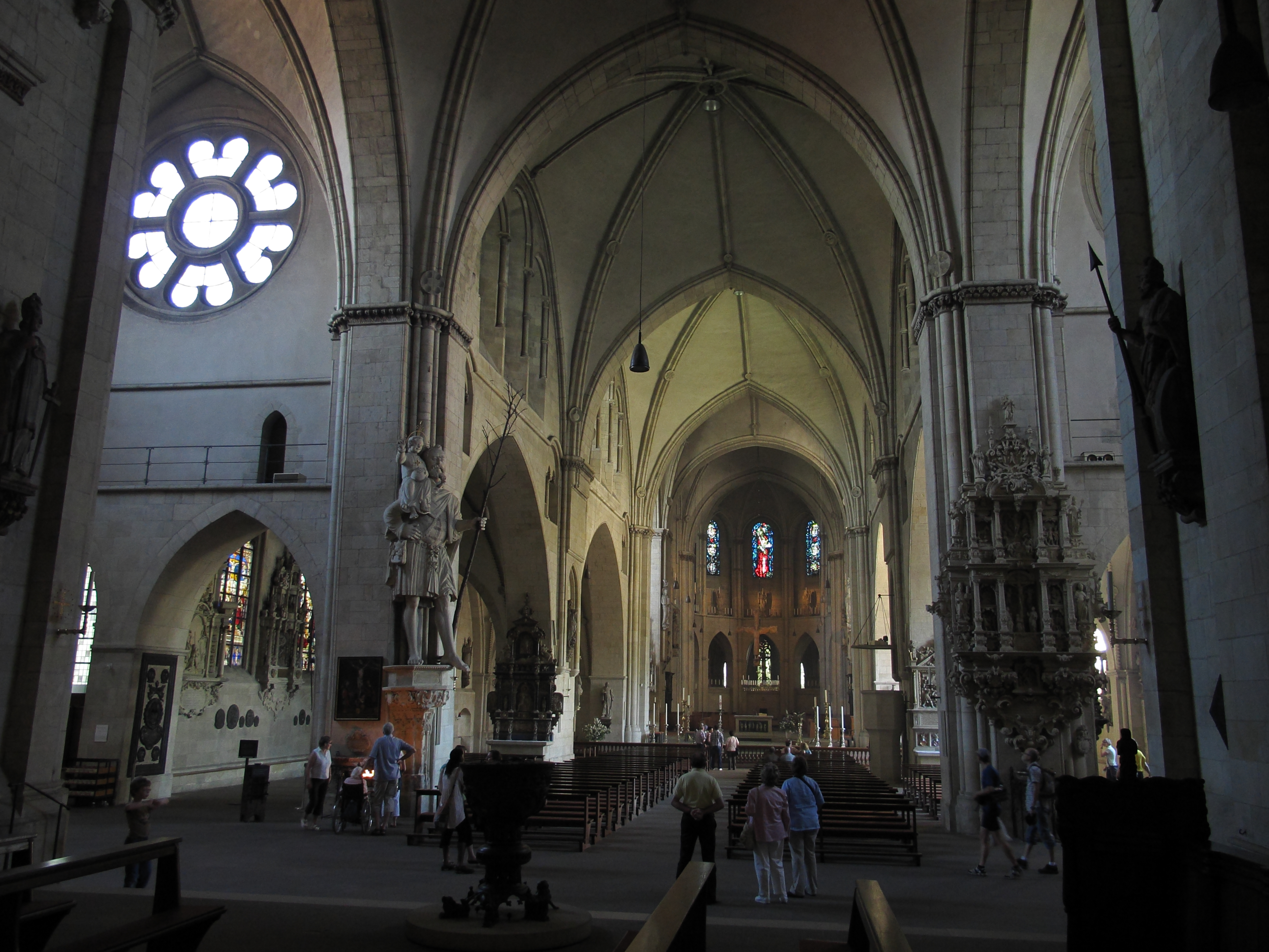
View down the nave towards the choir

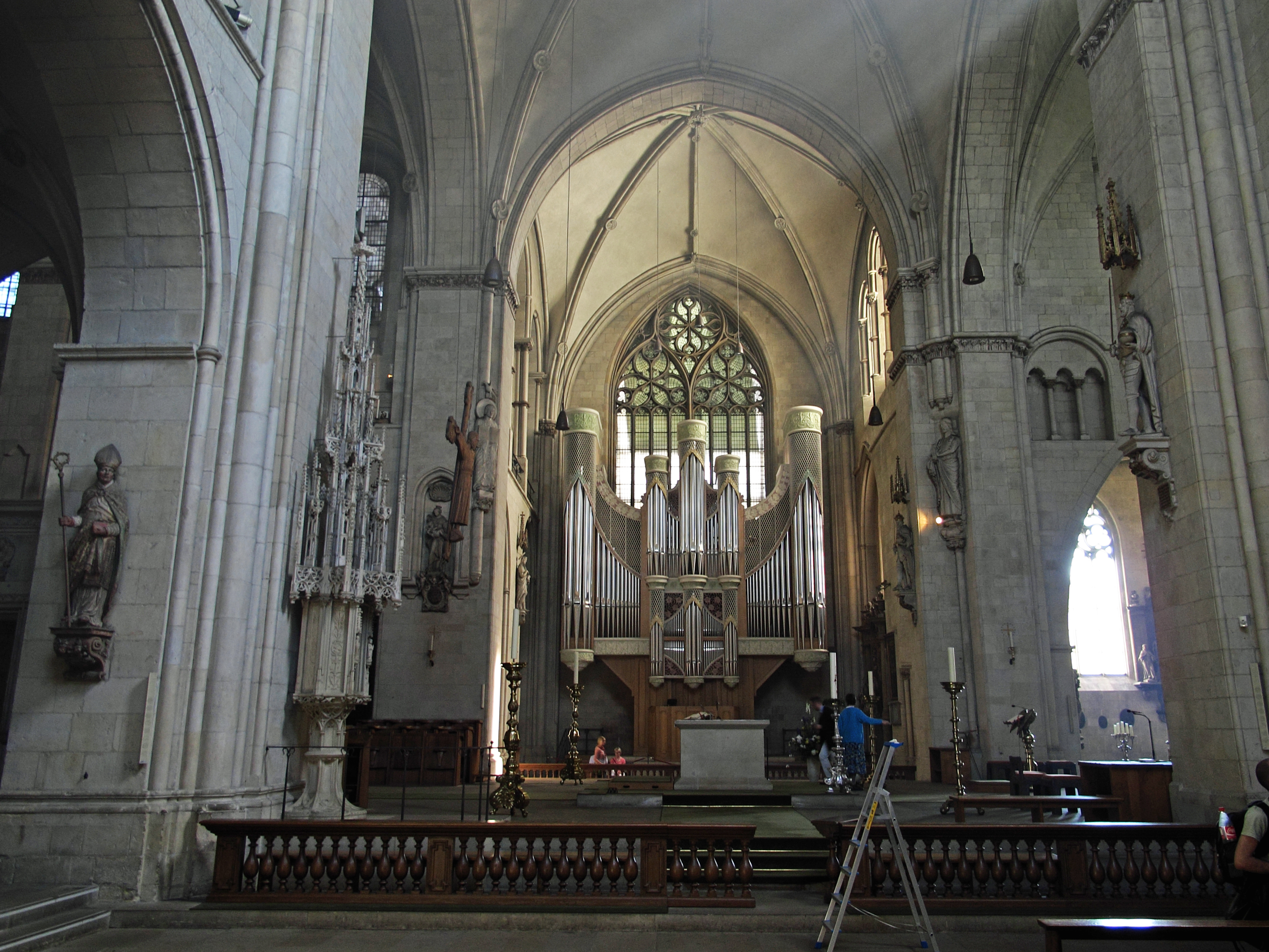
View of the organ in the south arm of the east transept

=== Choir chapels ===
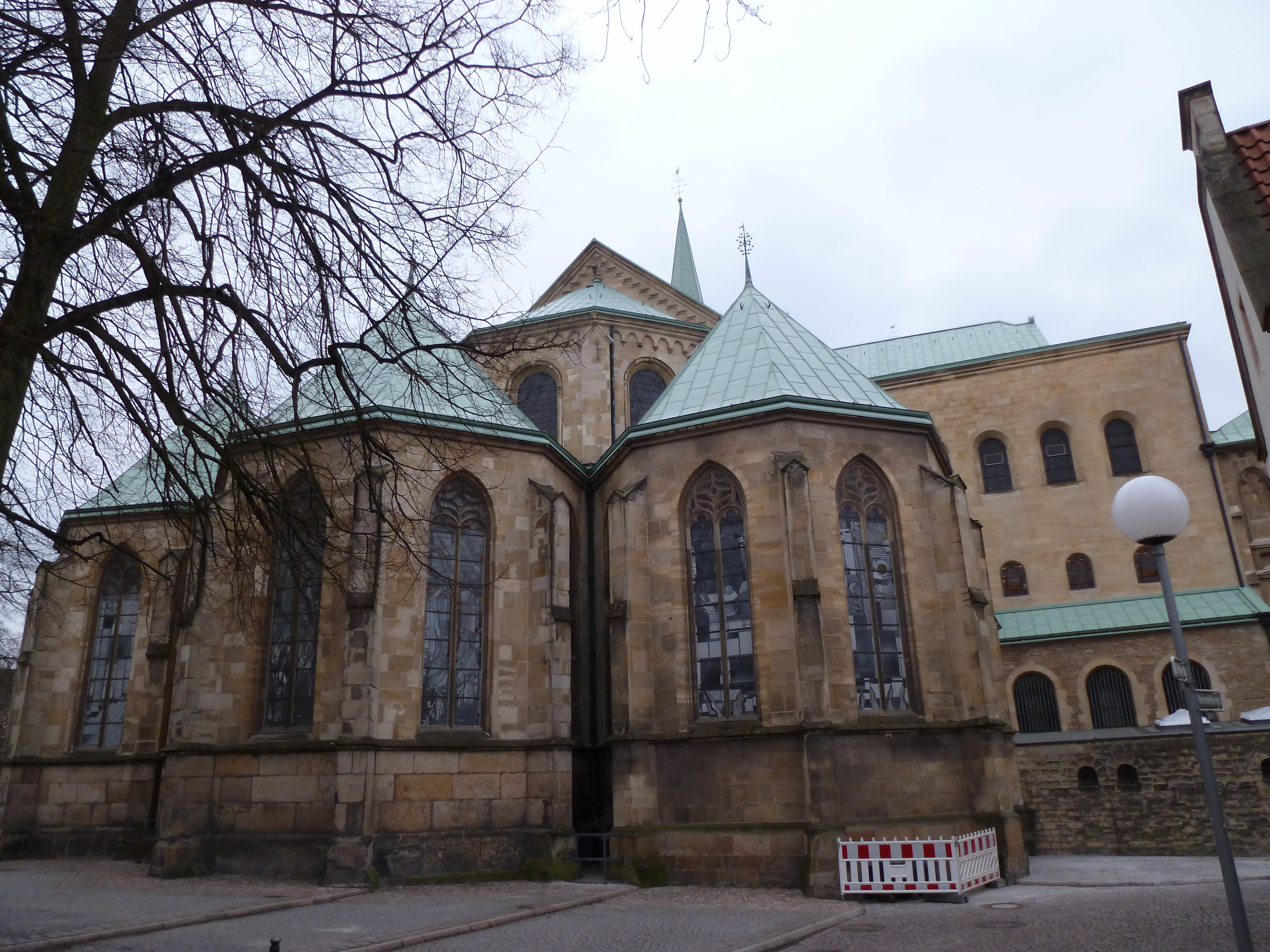
External view of the choir chapels: Kreuzkapelle at right, Josephskapelle in centre, Ludgeruskapelle at left. Maximuskapelle is not visible.

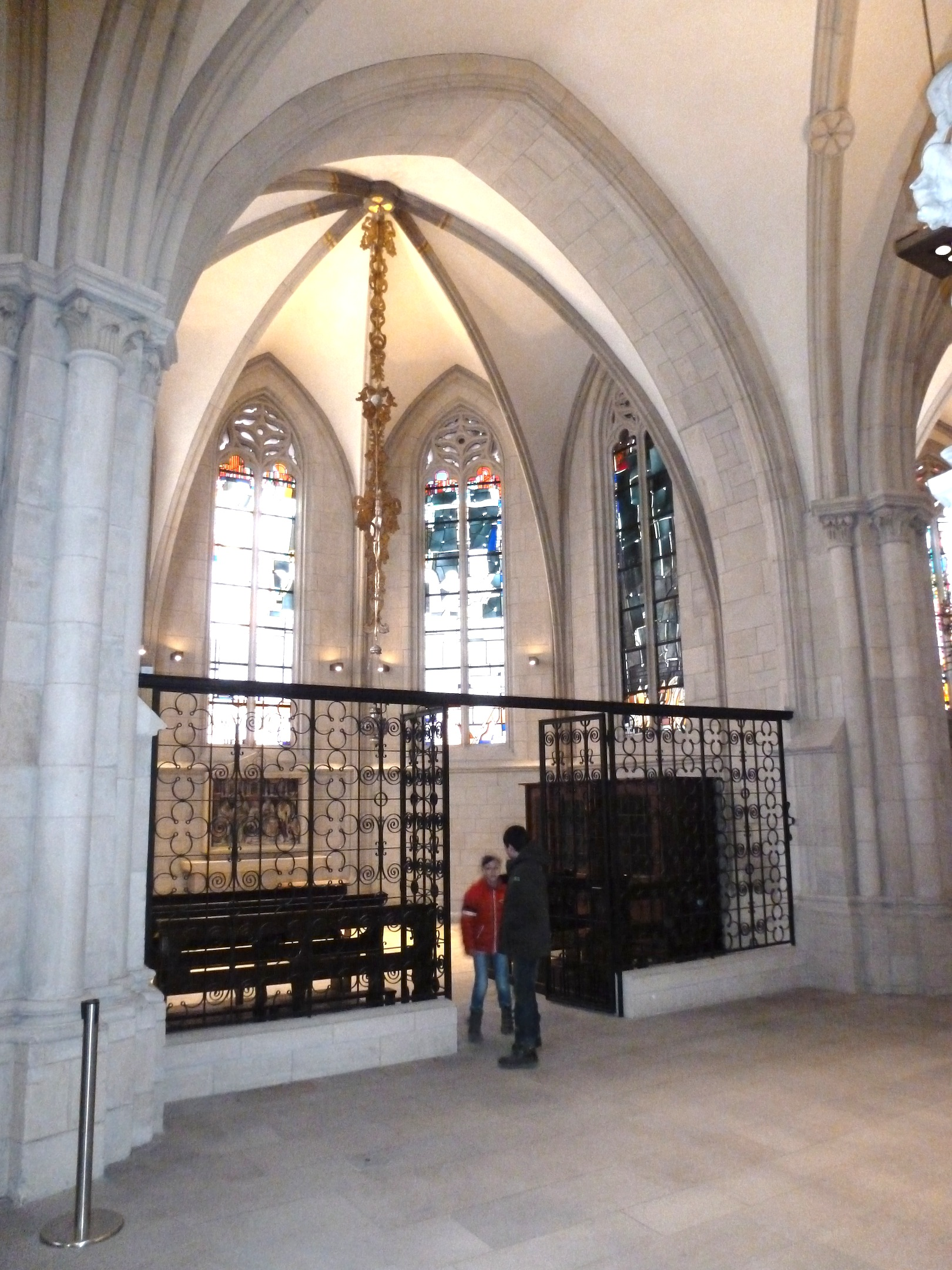
Portal of the Kreuzkapelle

Four side chapels branch from the ambulatory, like a crown.

==== Kreuzkapelle ====
- The Kreuzkapelle is north of the main apse.

==== Galen side chapels ====
These three chapels were built at the order of Prince-Bishop Christoph Bernhard von Galen from 1663 to supplement the pre-existing Kreuzkapelle. The reason for the construction was a vow made before victory over the city of Münster in 1661. They are known today as the "Galen side-chapels" (Galenschen Seitenkapellen). Most of their decoration was produced by the Prince-Bishop's court artist, Johann Mauritz Gröninger.

- The east side-chapel (on the axis of the main apse) is the Josephs-kapelle. Inside is the tomb of Prince-Bishop Christoph Bernard von Galen.
- South of the main apse is the Ludgerus-Kapelle. Its contents include the memorial of Clemens August Graf von Galen and the Reliquary statue of St Liudger
- The southernmost side chapel is the Maximus-kapelle. It contains a valuable ivory crucifix and the grave of assistant bishop Maximilian Gereon Graf von Galen.
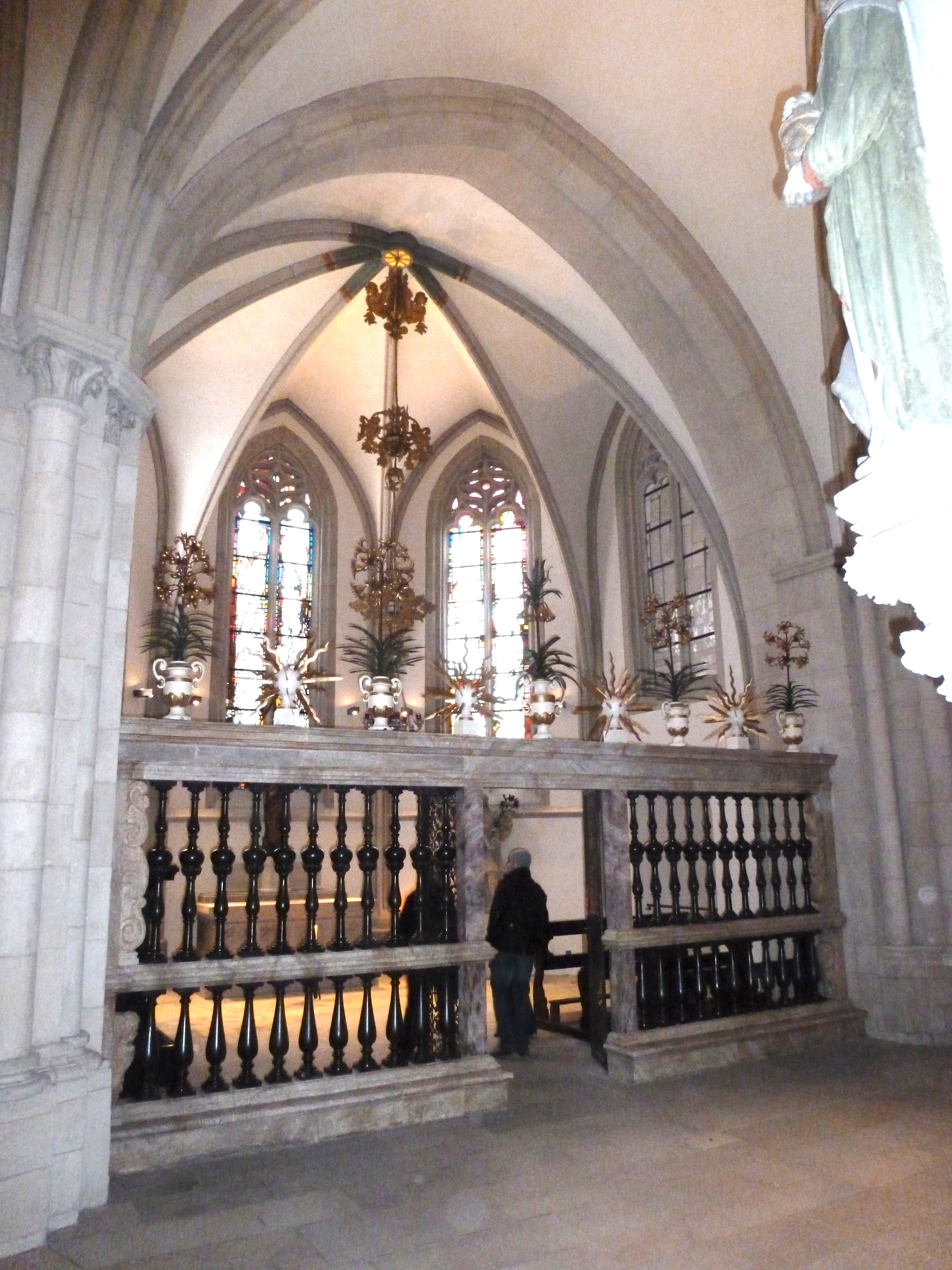
Portal of Josephskapelle.

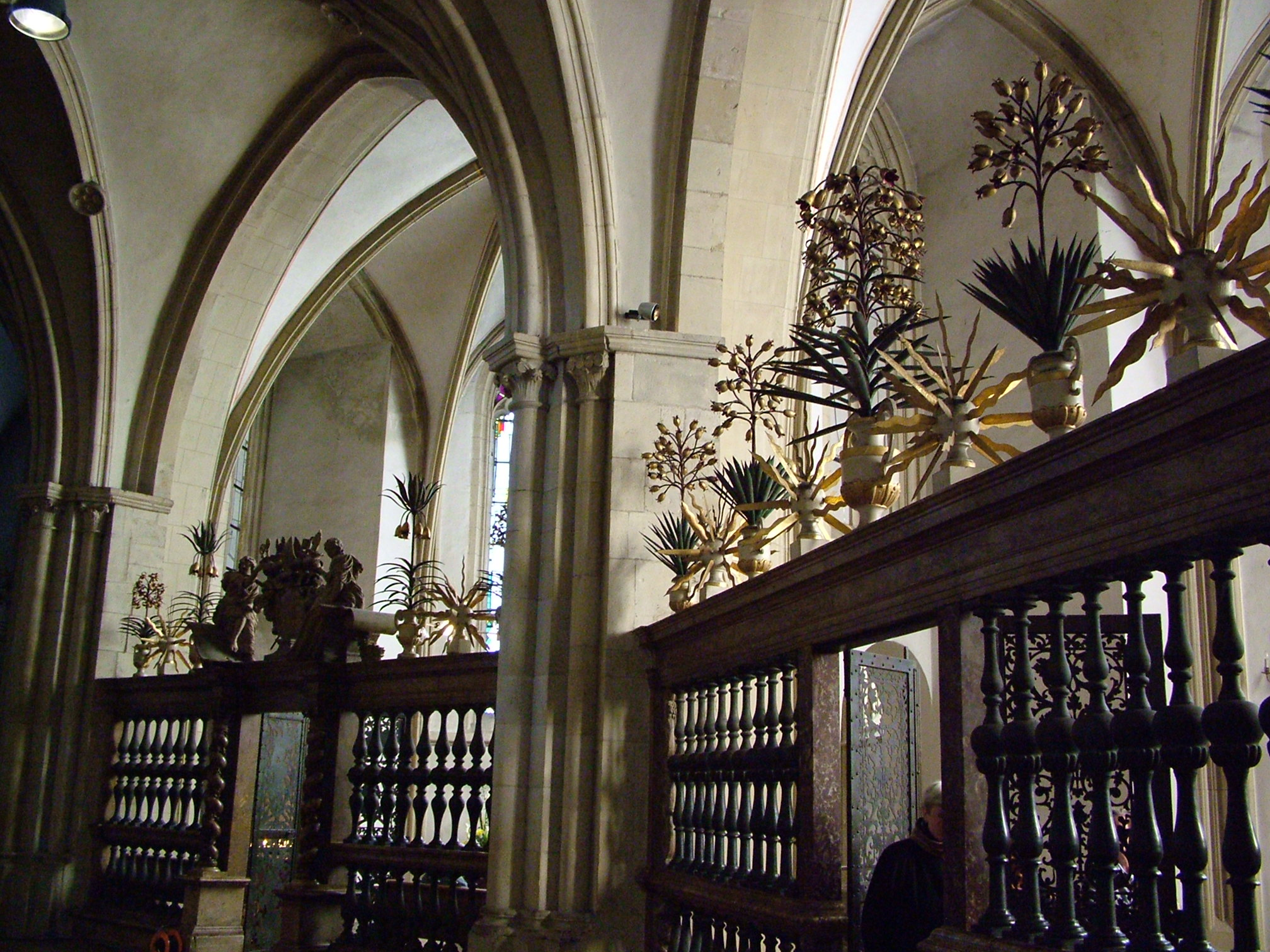
At left, portal of the Ludgeruskapelle; at right, Maximuskapelle.

=== Cloisters, extensions and Domherrenfriedhof ===
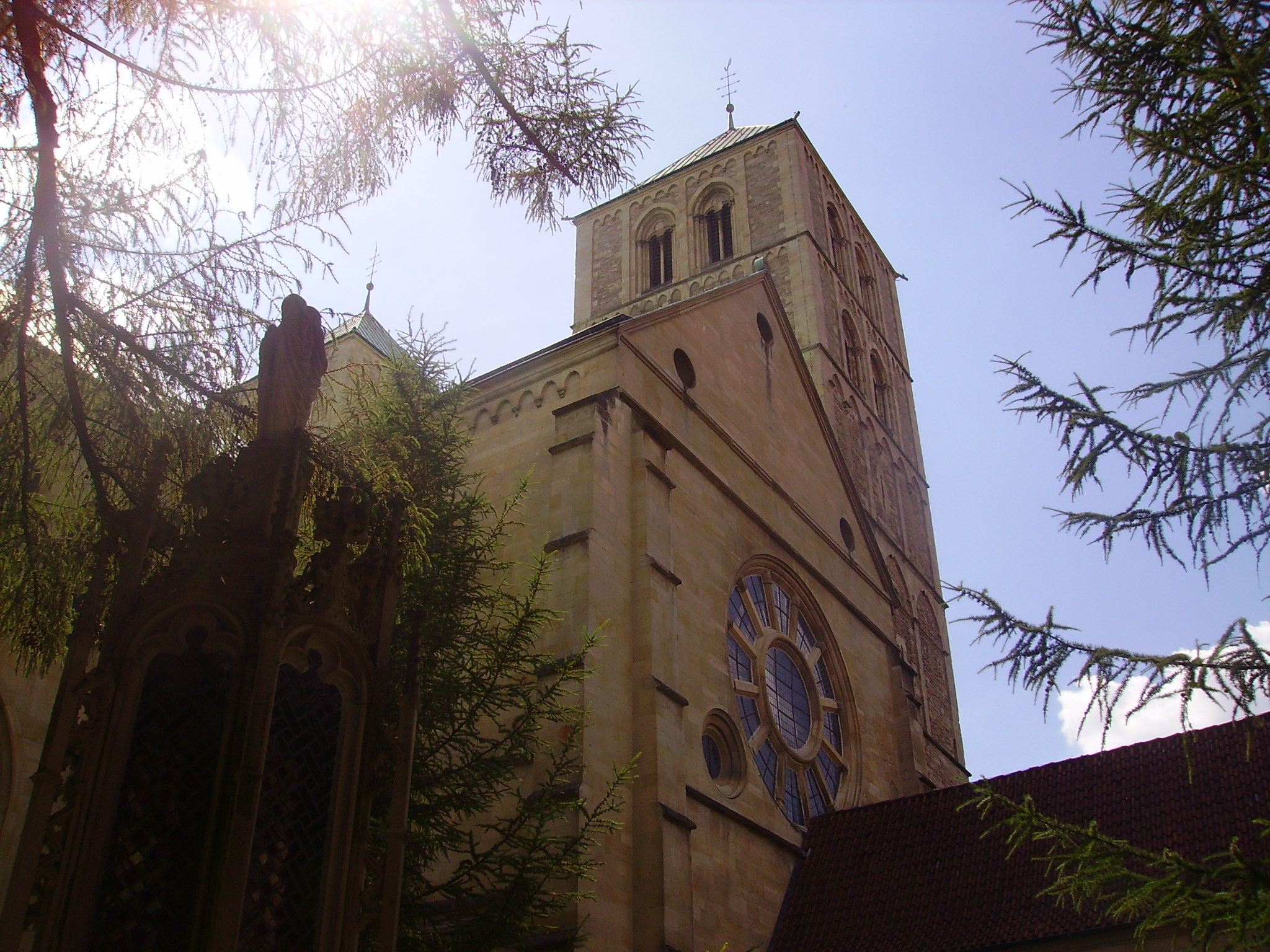
View of the north tower from the Domherrenfriedhof

North of the cathedral are the cloisters (U), which are accessed through doors in the northern arms of the two transepts. These cloisters were built in 1390–1395. From the cloisters, one can access the sacristry (X), the Marienkapelle (W), the new treasury chamber and the Garden hall (V).

==== Chapter house ====
The chapter house (T) is accessed from the sacristry (and the choir). The cathedral chapter convenes in this hall, when a new bishop is ordained. In the hall is a dark wooden table with twelve high-backed stools for the members of the chapter. The wood-panelling on the walls resembles that in Friedensaal of the City Hall. The panels display the arms of former capitularies, who were all appointed from the nobility until the beginning of the nineteenth century.

==== Garden Hall ====
From the northern cloisters one can access the bishop's Garden hall (Gartensaal), which is also known as the "Kachelzimmer" (Tiled room) or "blau zimmer" (blue room). The hall's walls are decorated with white-blue tiles and until the bombing of the cathedral in 1943 it was part of the bishop's palace. The tiles depict the four elements, the four seasons, the Sun and Moon (or Day and Night), the Apostle Paul and a scene of Jesus "calming the storm" (Matthew 8.24–27). These tiles were installed in the sixteenth century and only about a third of the originals survive; the remaining tiles are artistic restorations.

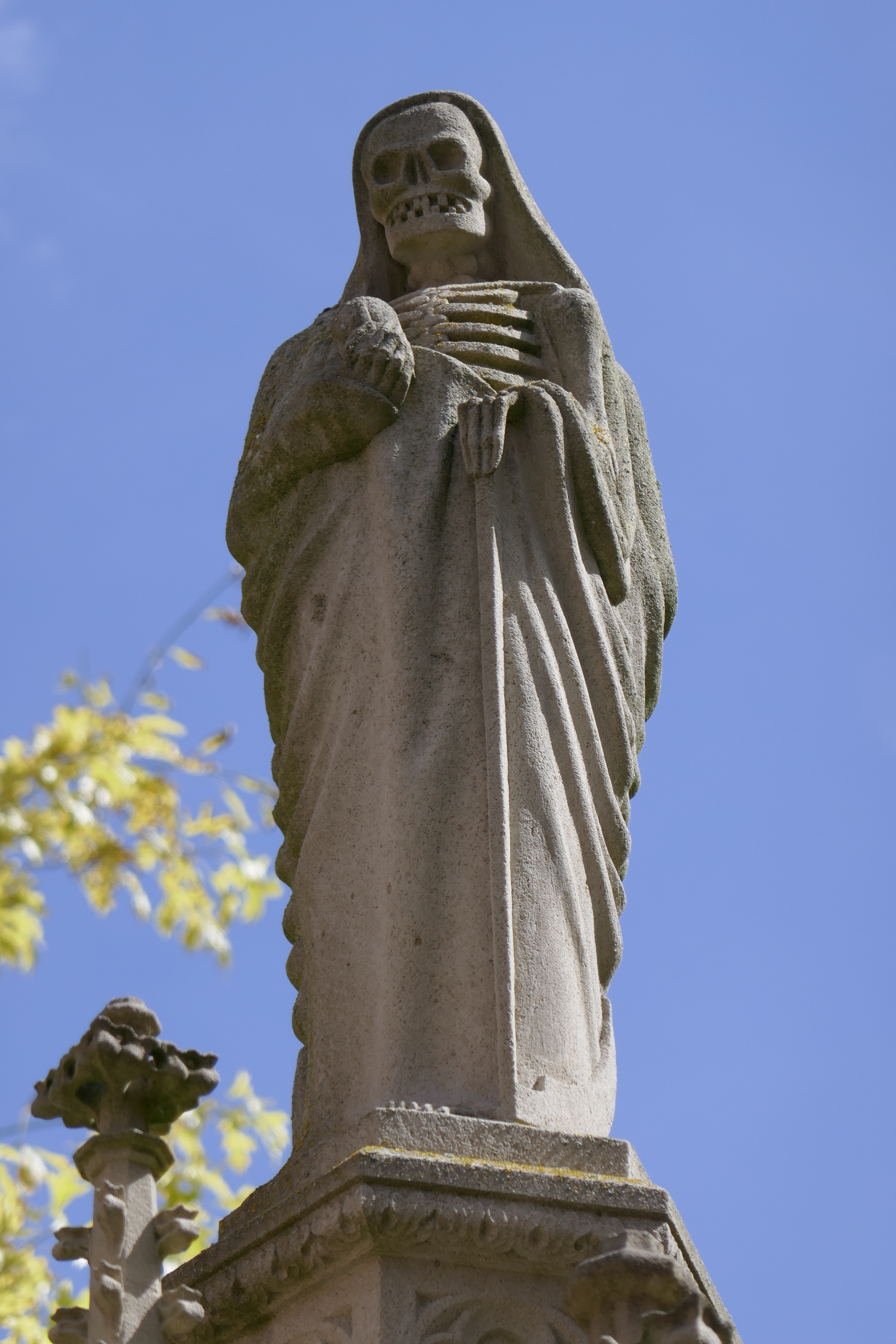
Figure at the lantern of the dead

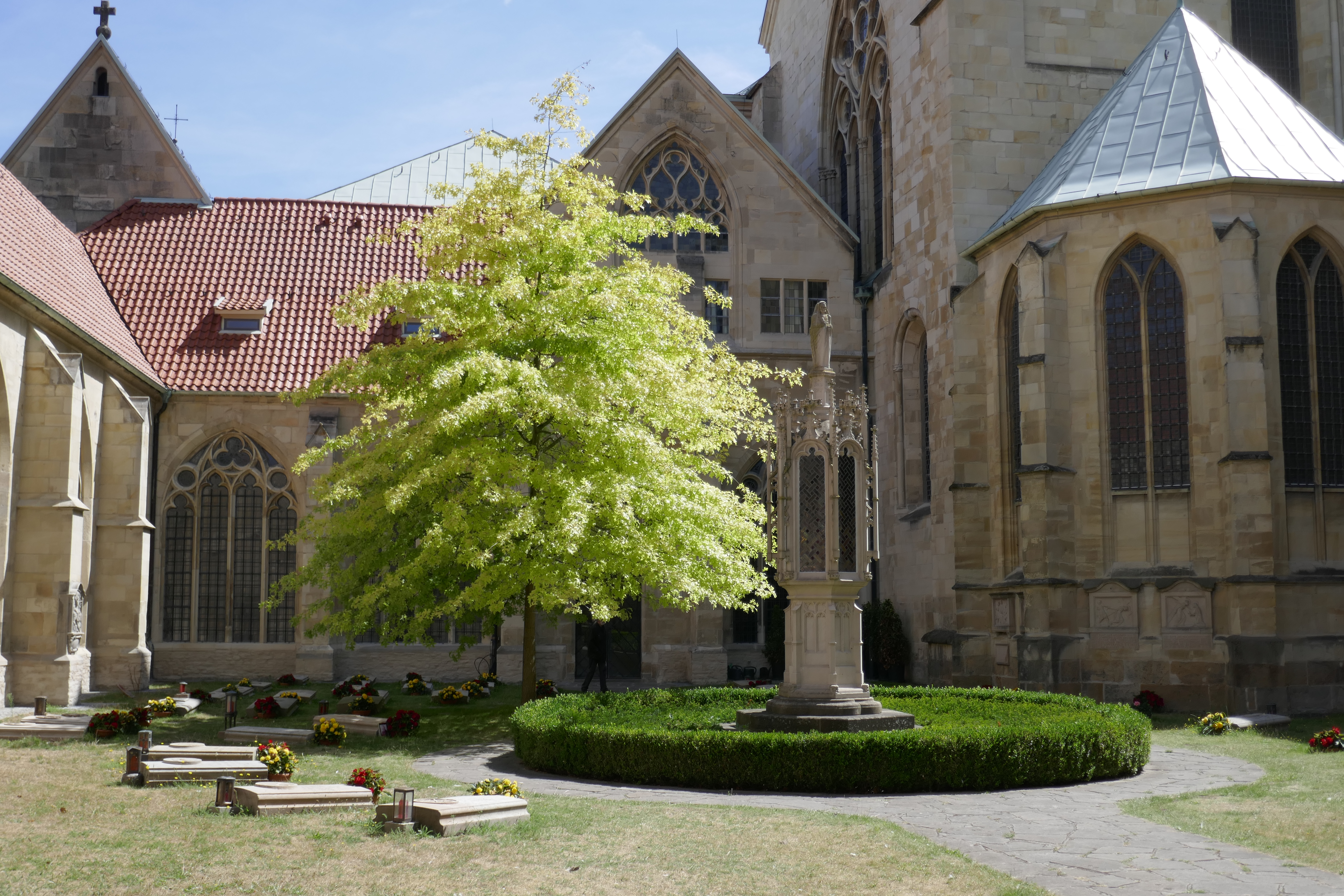
Quadrangle of the cloisters with the Cemetery of the Domherrs

==== Domherrenfriedhof ====
The quadrangle inside the cloisters contains the cemetery of the Domherrs (V, German: Domherrenfriedhof). The cemetery is still in use today. Among the most recent burials were those of auxiliary bishop Josef Voß in 2009, auxiliary bishop Alfons Demming in 2012, cathedral vicar Hans Ossing in 2014 and cathedral provost Josef Alfers in 2022.

In the center of the cemetery is a lantern of the dead created in the middle of the 16th century, presumably by a sculptor from Münster. The figure of the death on its top was renewed in 1929. In 1985, the lantern was replaced by a copy.

=== Measurements and statistics ===
Position	
Length of cathedral	109.00 m
Width (including paradise)	52.85 m
Width of nave	28.30 m
Height of nave	22.50 m
Width of east transept	43.30 m
Width of west transept	40.55 m
Height of north tower	57.70 m
Height of south tower	55.50 m

Position	
Number of seats	ca. 700
Roof area	ca. 5,500 m^{2}
Number of bells	10
Largest bell	7,600 kg
Register of the cathedral organ	74 + 14

== Furnishings ==
Despite the heavy damage to the cathedral in the Second World War, it still contains numerous side altars, epitaphs and statues of saints. These derive from the Gothic, Renaissance and Baroque periods. Within and around the cathedral are also numerous furnishings and artworks from the post-war period, especially from the 1990s.

The numbers in brackets in the following section refer to the following plan, which indicates the locations of the most significant items.

Groundplan of the cathedral today; Numbers = locations of items
No.	Item	Nr.	Ausstattungsgegenstand
1	Baroque high altar	13	Wheel chandelier
2	Tomb of Cardinal Höffner	14	St. Antonius Statue
3	Font	15	Bust of Cardinal von Galen
4	Triptych	16	Stations of the Cross
5	Christophorus-Statue	17	Astronomical Clock
6	Van Büren Epitaph altar	18	Ivory crucifix
7	Organ	19	Tomb of Christoph B. von Galen
8	Tomb of von Plettenberg	20	Burial place of Cardinal von Galen
9	Stephanus-Altar	21	Reliquary statue of St Ludgerus
10	High altar	22	Meistermann windows
11	Triumphal cross	23	Der Bettler
12	Tabernacle	24	Crucifixion group

=== Westwerk ===
==== Baroque high altar ====
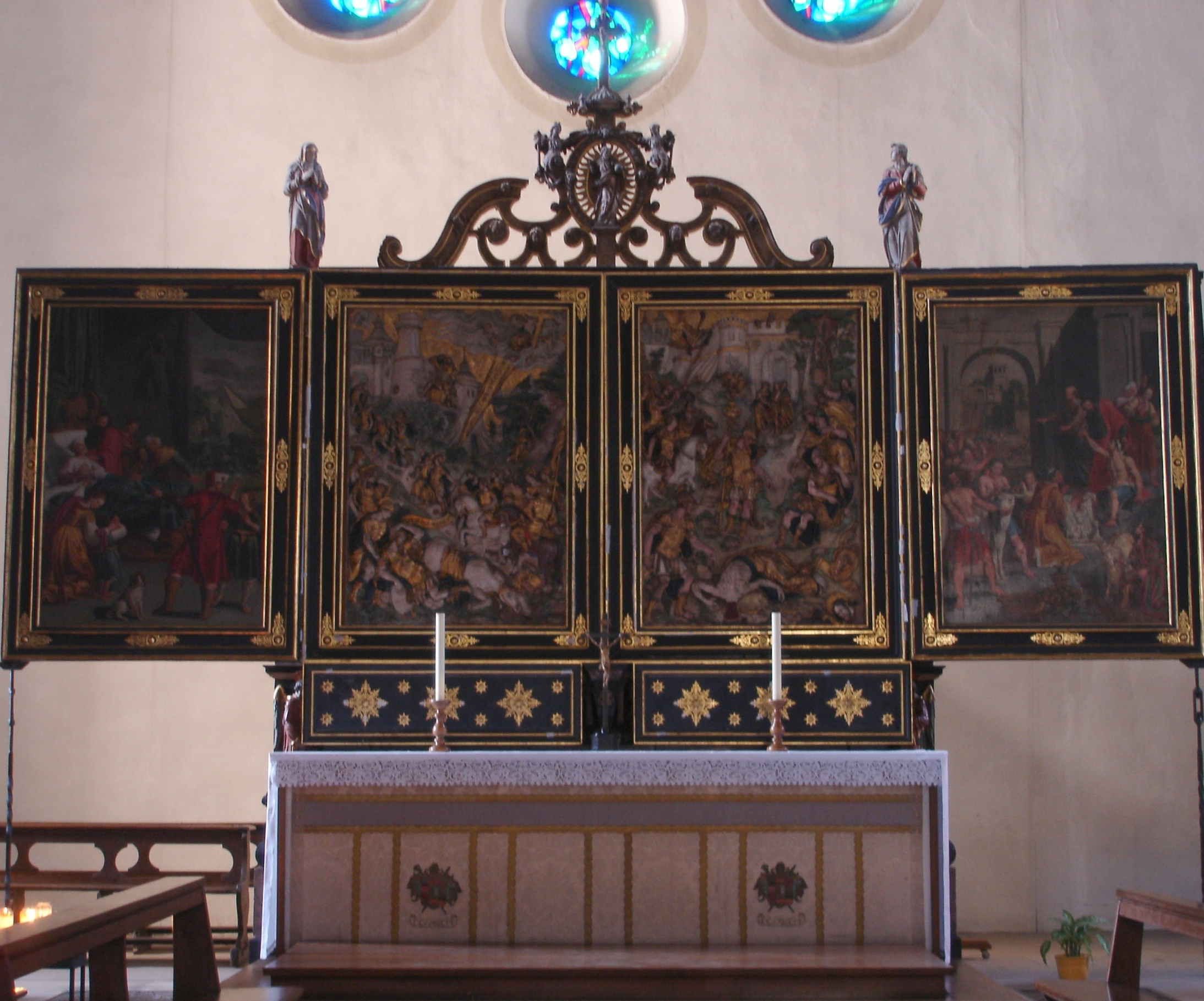
Baroque high altar

On the west wall of the Old Choir is the Baroque high altar (1.), which was made by Adrian van den Boegart und Gerhard Gröninger. The high altar was donated by Gröninger on behalf of the cathedral chapter in 1619. The new high altar was intended to be able to hold, protect and display all the relics of the cathedral. Gröninger supplied further altar designs, in which the central part of the altar (retabel) was conceived as a stone reliquary. He discussed the form of the altar wings, also in 1619, with the important painter Peter Paul Rubens. But the order for the six panel paintings of the altar wings was filled in the end by Adrian van den Boegart of Amsterdam.

The high altar, with its painted and carved wings was located in the high choir of the cathedral from its creation until the beginning of the twentieth century and permanently displayed various relics. In the course of the restoration of the altar space and high choir after the Second World War, the high altar was transferred to the westwerk. The relics which were originally housed in the high altar, are now on display in the cathedral treasury. The fourteenth-century statues of the Apostles, which were also displayed on the high altar, are now in lighted niches of the celebration altar at the centre of the altar island. The central part of the high altar is only decorated with the items from the cathedral treasury for which it was originally made on special occasions – most recently the cathedral jubilee in 2014.

===== Folding doors =====
The high altar depicts central scenes and events in the life of St Paul.

When closed (especially during Advent and fasts) the depictions of miracles worked by St Paul on the back sides of the two altar wings are visible. When opened, the left wing shows the healing of Saint Publius' sick father on Malta, while the right wing shows the people of Lystra bringing offerings to Paul and Barnabas.

When the wings are opened, a further pair of wings are visible, which decorate the central marble reliquary shrine. Their exterior was designed by Gröninger himself and shows two scenes in shallow relief: the Conversion of Paul and his decapitation. The interior shows the same two scenes, but as paintings.

===== Marble shrine =====
The marble shrine itself in the centre of the high altar is intended to hold the more than 57 expensive vessels, statues, reliquaries and over treasures from the romanesque, gothic and Baroque periods. The central part was not made of sandstone, but of black and dark red marble, which contrasts strikingly with the gold and silver reliquaries. Gröninger arranged the shrine in four levels; each dedicated to a single important "time" or phase of religious history.

The uppermost pedimental level was dedicated to the "time of the prophets" and contained the 14 busts of Biblical patriarchs, kings and prophets which were made between 1380 and 1390. The two middle levels were dedicated to the "wealth of times" or the "Middle time." This was the place for the 14th-century statues of the apostles which have been displayed on the front of the modern high altar in the crossing since 1956, but it also has space for a 13th-century statue of the Mother of God enthroned and for a reliquary cross from the beginning of the 12th century. The bottom level is devoted to the time of time of Christian love and witness. This has space for various reliquaries of numerous saints, including Paul, as well as saints associated with the diocese.

==== Baptismal font ====
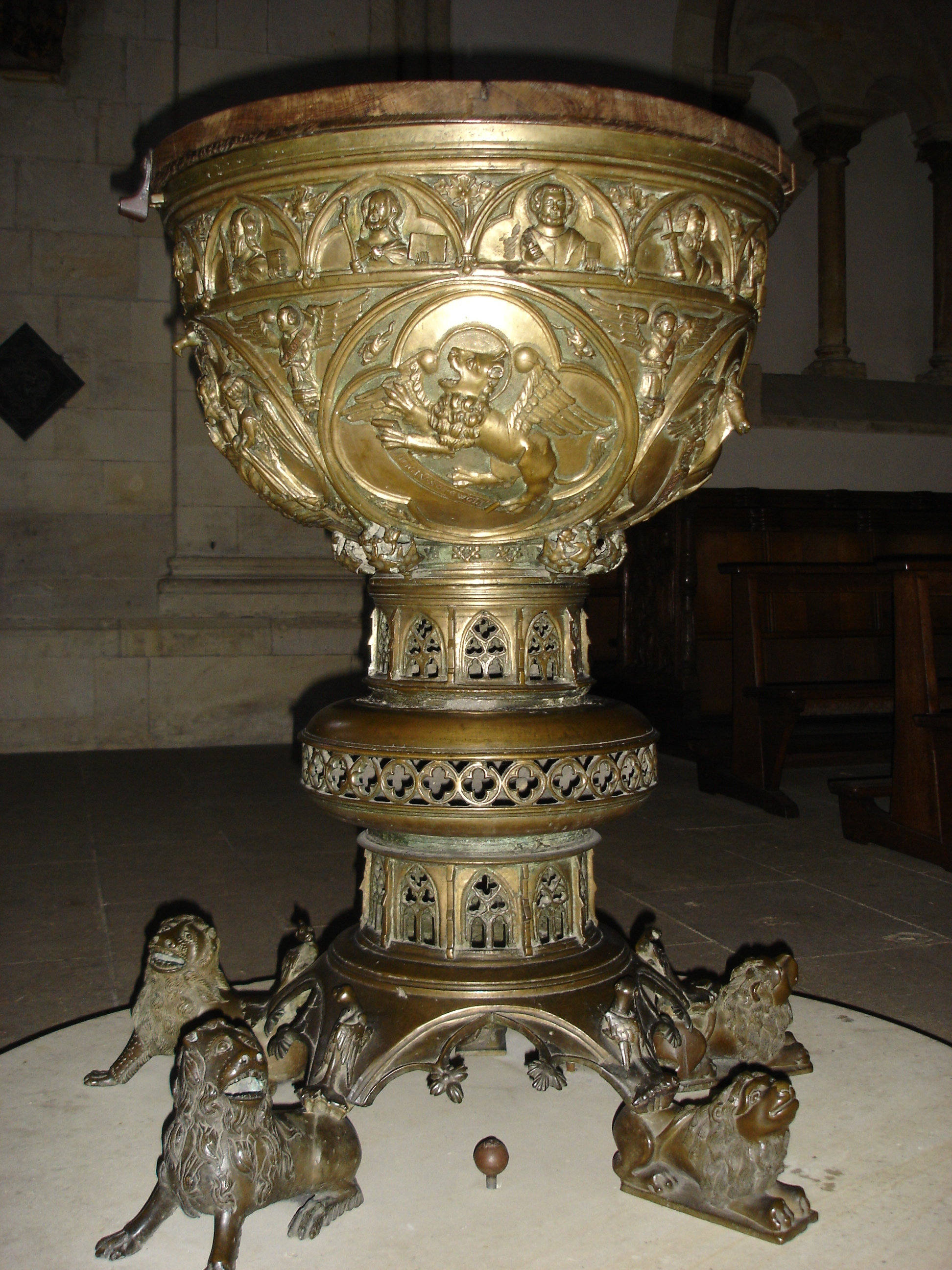
Baptismal font with lion motifs in the west choir

The baptismal font (3.) in the Old Choir dates from the early 14th century. It shows depictions of the Baptism of Jesus and the four evangelists.

==== Plaque for Cardinal Höffner ====
On the northwest crossing pillar of the westwerk hangs a memorial (2.) for Cardinal Joseph Höffner who was Bishop of Münster (1962–1968). It is a bronze relief (shoulder bust) made by sculptor Karl Burgeff of Cologne and was installed in the cathedral during the city's 1200th anniversary celebrations. The relief is about 1.46 m high and 60 cm wide. It shows the Cardinal in episcopal costume, i.e. the cope and mitre, but without his crozier. His narrow, ascetic face is striking; his severe eyes look out directly at the viewer from thick glasses.

The plaque reads "Gedenken an Joseph Kardinal Höffner 1906–1987 / Bischof von Münster 1962–1968 / Erzbischof von Köln 1969–1987" (In gratitude for Cardinal Joseph Höffner 1906–1987 / Bishop of Münster 1962–1968 / Archbishop of Cologne 1968–1987) and also has a quote of the bishop on the occasion of his departure: "Wenn ihr alles getan habt, was euch befohlen wurde, sollt ihr sagen: wir sind unnütze Knechte! Wir haben nur unsere Schuldigkeit getan. Keiner von uns wird zu sagen wagen, dass er alles getan hat. Deshalb bitte ich um Vergebung für alles, was ich als Bischof versäumt habe" (When you have done everything asked of you, you should say: we are useless servants! We have only done our duty. None of us will dare to say that they have done everything. So I beg forgiveness for everything I have not done as bishop). The relief shows the bronze arms of the cardinal as well, with his motto "justitia et carita" (justice and love).

==== Triptych ====
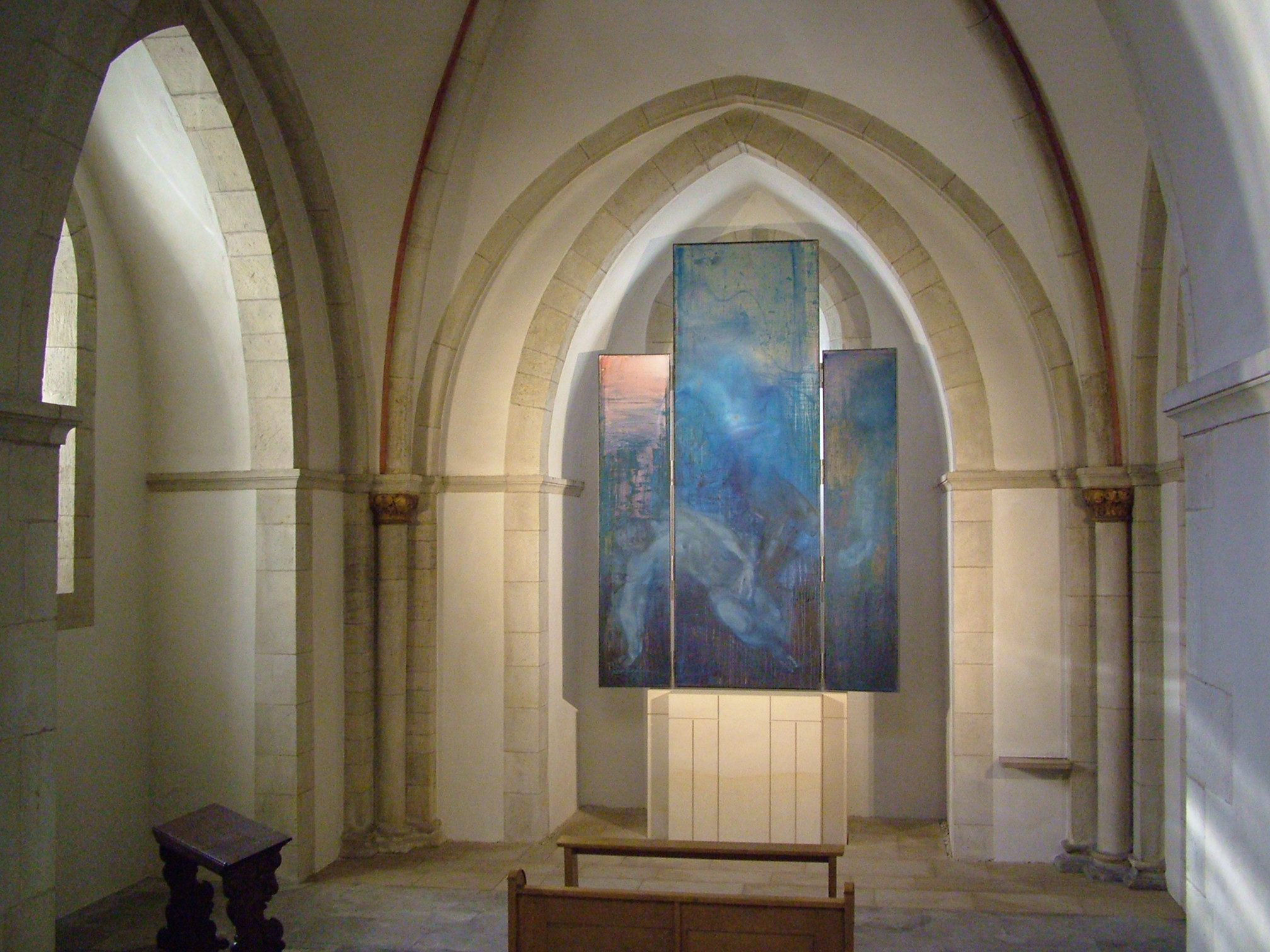
Triptych in the south tower chapel

There is a large triptych (4.) "Pietà und Auferstehung" (Piety and Resurrection) in the chapel of the south tower, which was made by artist Thomas Lange. It shows the descent from the cross in the foreground and the sketched shape of Mary in the background, with the dead Christ resting in her lap. God the Father is visible in the upper part. The triptych was donated by a private individual.

==== Statue of St Barbara ====
In the entrance area (south-west transept) is a statue of St Barbara which is not very prominently displayed. She holds a round tower with three windows in her hands. The legend has it that the saint was locked in a tower by her father to keep her from marriage and Christian influence. Because of the cramped nature of the tower and its stairway, she is now patron saint of miners – the cramped tower symbolises the way through the narrow door of death to eternal life.

==== Images ====
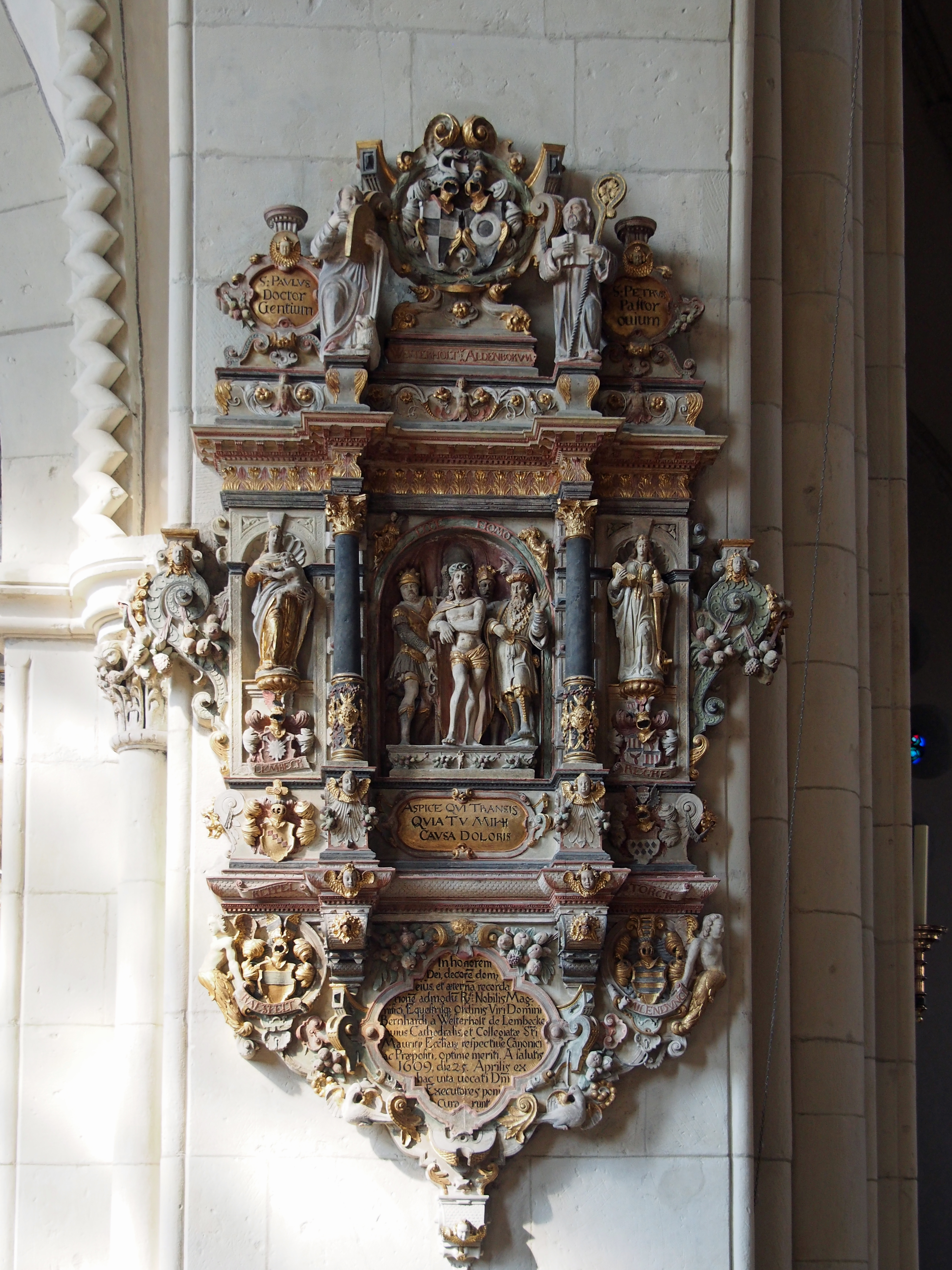
Epitaph of Bernhard von Westerholt († 1609)

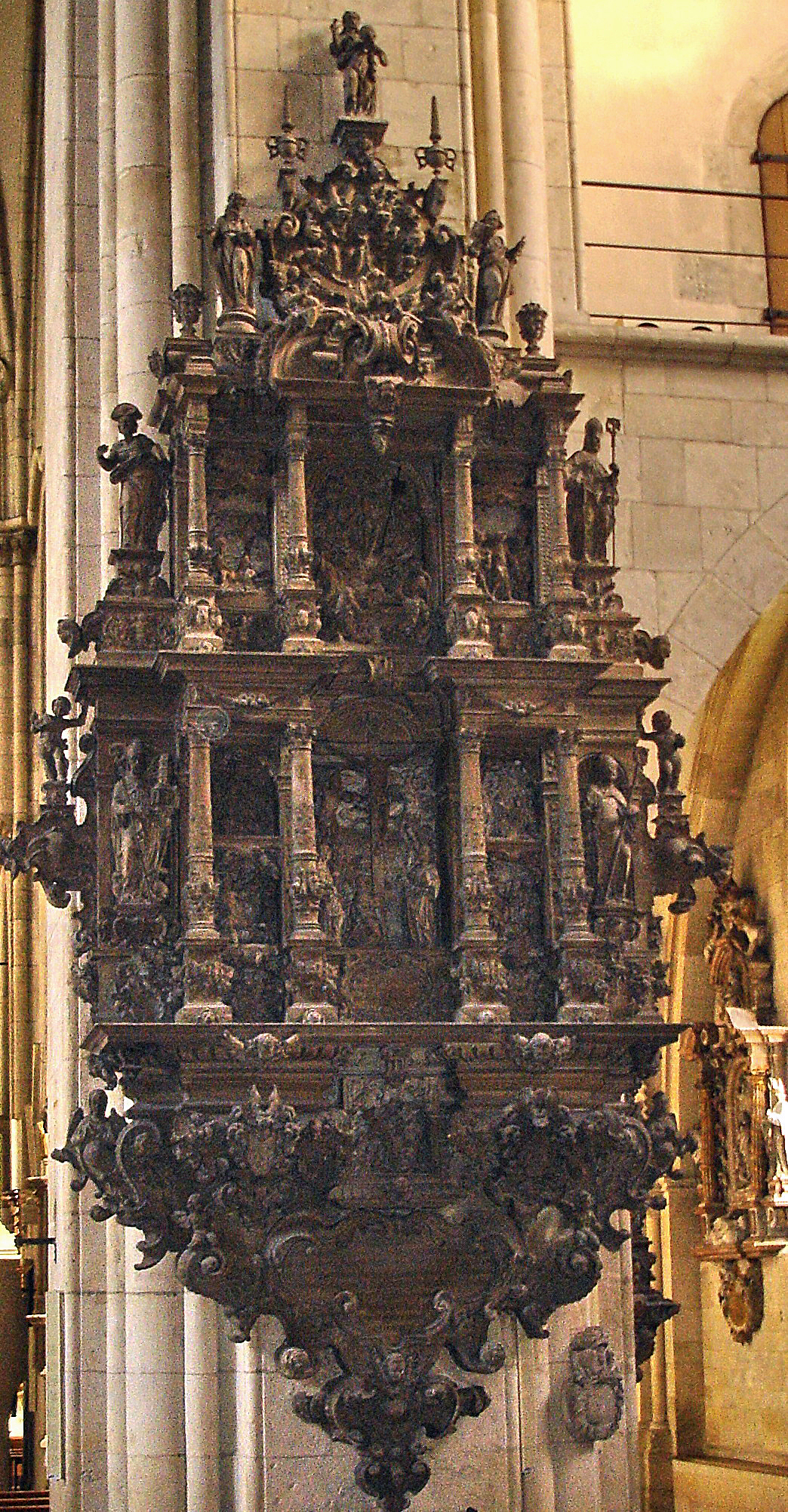
Epitaph of Otto von Dorgelo (in the transept)

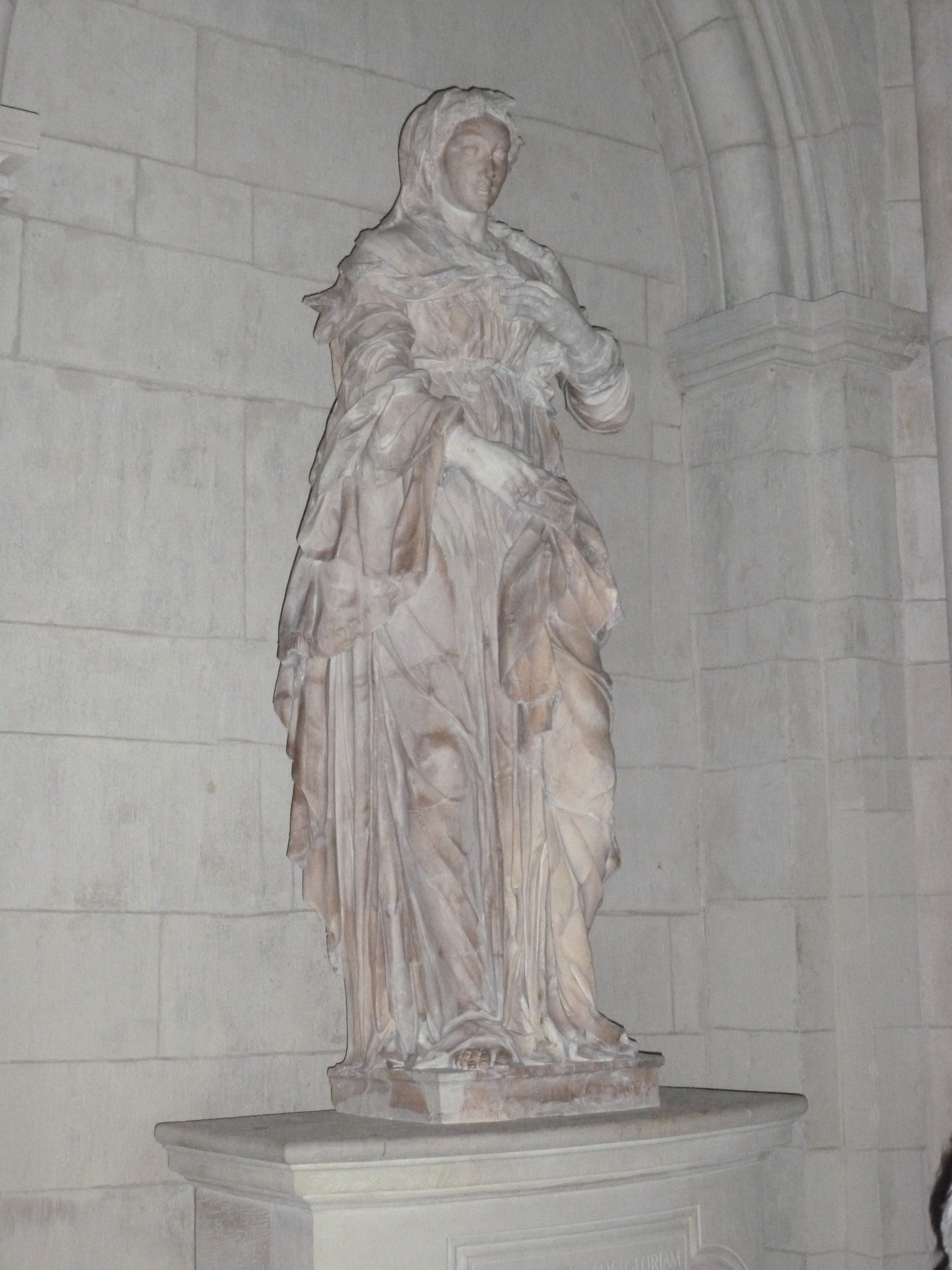
Depiction of Mary

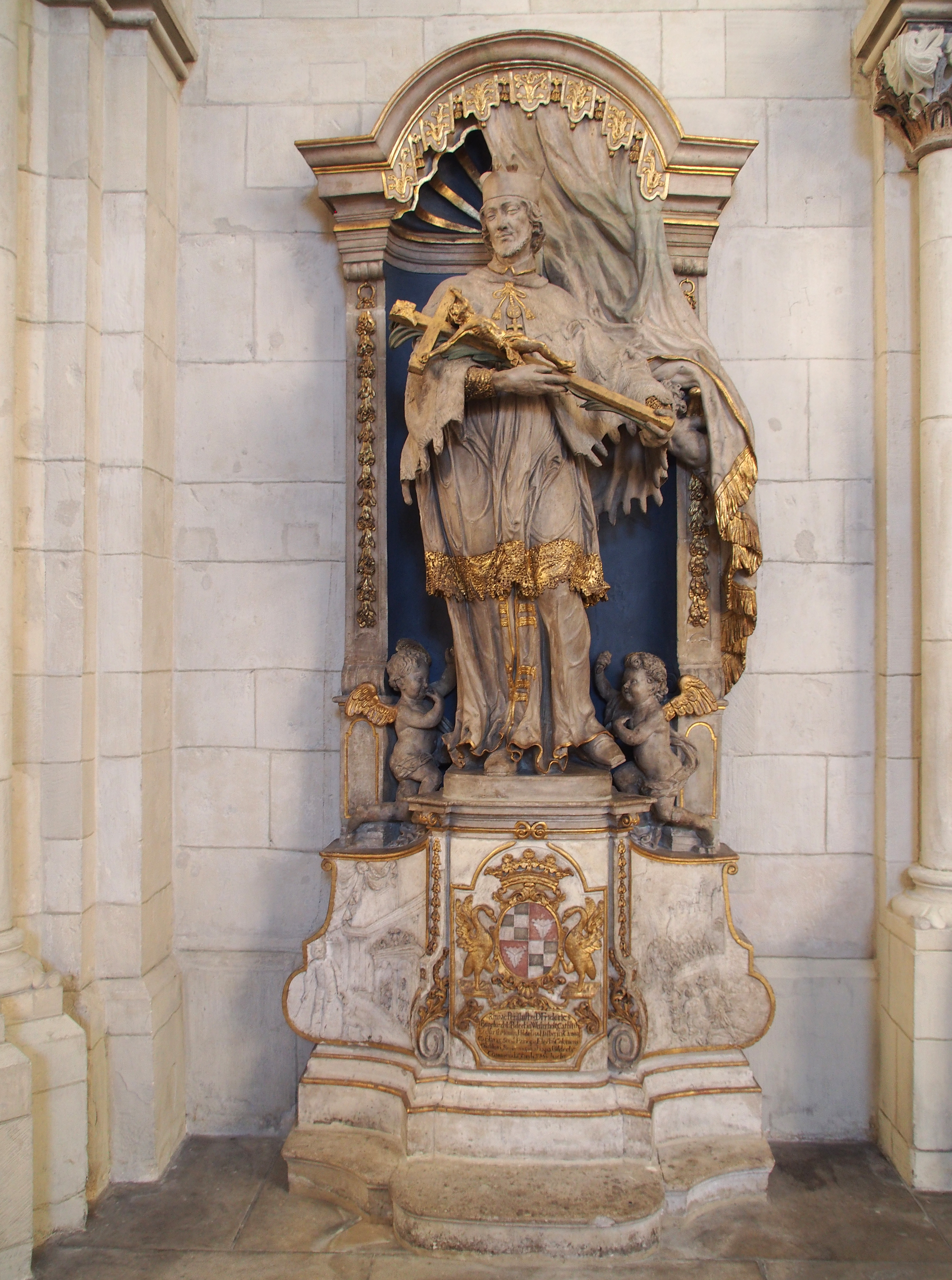
Statue in the paradise

=== Nave ===
==== Christophorus-Statue ====
On the pillar on the northern transition from the west transept to the central aisle of the nave is a monumental statue of St Christopher (5.). Statues of this saint have been common in entrance ways since the Middle Ages: a quick look at the statue is meant to protect from sudden death. The sculpture dates to 1627. It was made by Johann von Bocholt.

The sculpture was only slightly damaged in the Second World War. In the course of the restoration work after the war however, the original paintwork of the statue was destroyed. In its left hand the statue holds a leafless trunk with branches. On his right shoulder is the young Jesus, with his right hand raised in a benediction. The inscription on the base of the statue commemorates provost and Domherr Johann Heidenreich of Vörden zu Darfeld, who commissioned it.

==== St Catherine ====
Opposite the pulpit is a statue of St Catherine. She is the patroness of preachers and is invoked to save the "tongue tied."

==== Von Velen's Epitaph ====
In the south side-aisle (I) is the epitaph of Domsenior Anton Heinrich Hermann von Valen, which was made in his lifetime by the carpenter Johann Heinrich König and was completed in 1738.

==== Images ====
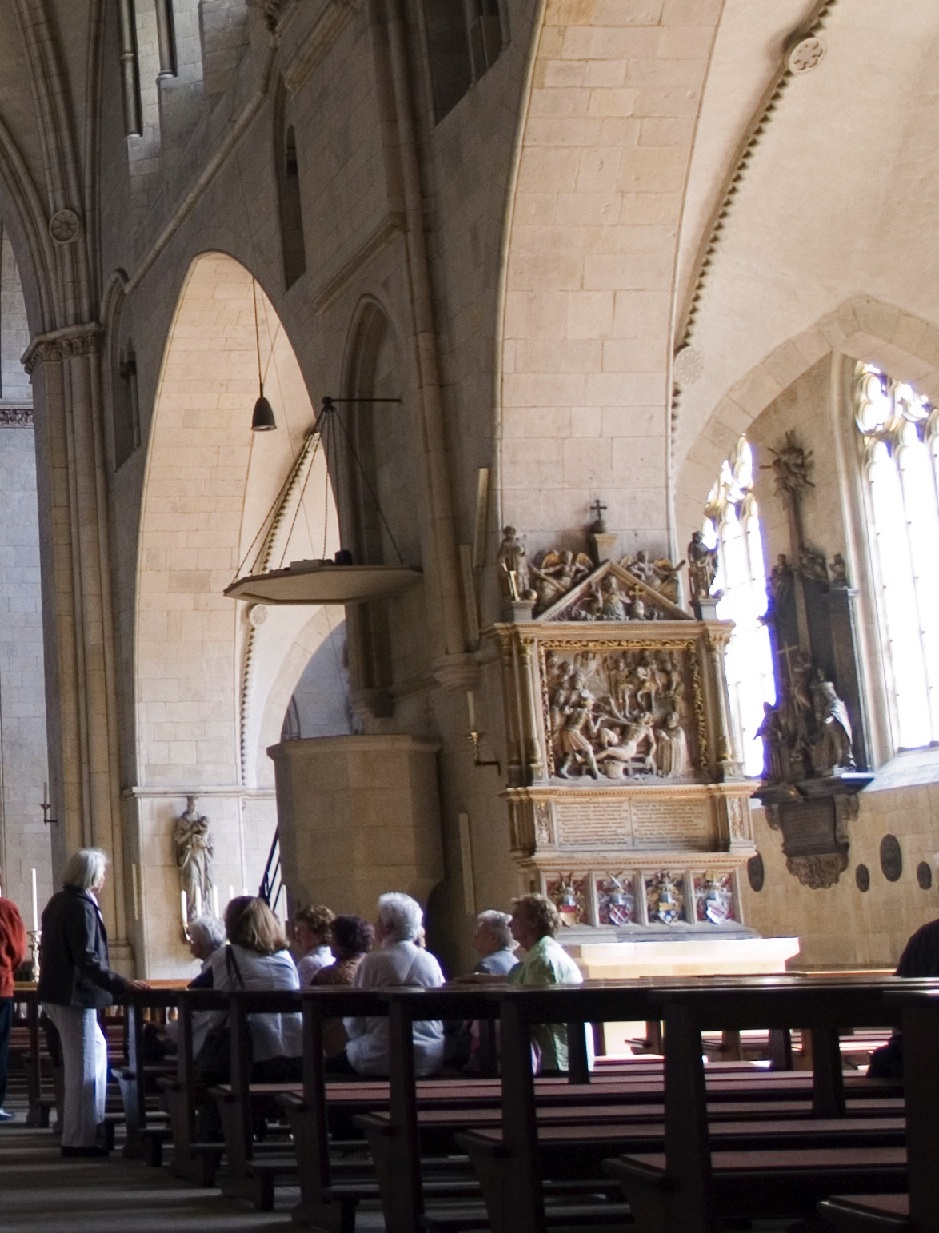
Pulpit and Laurentius-Altar

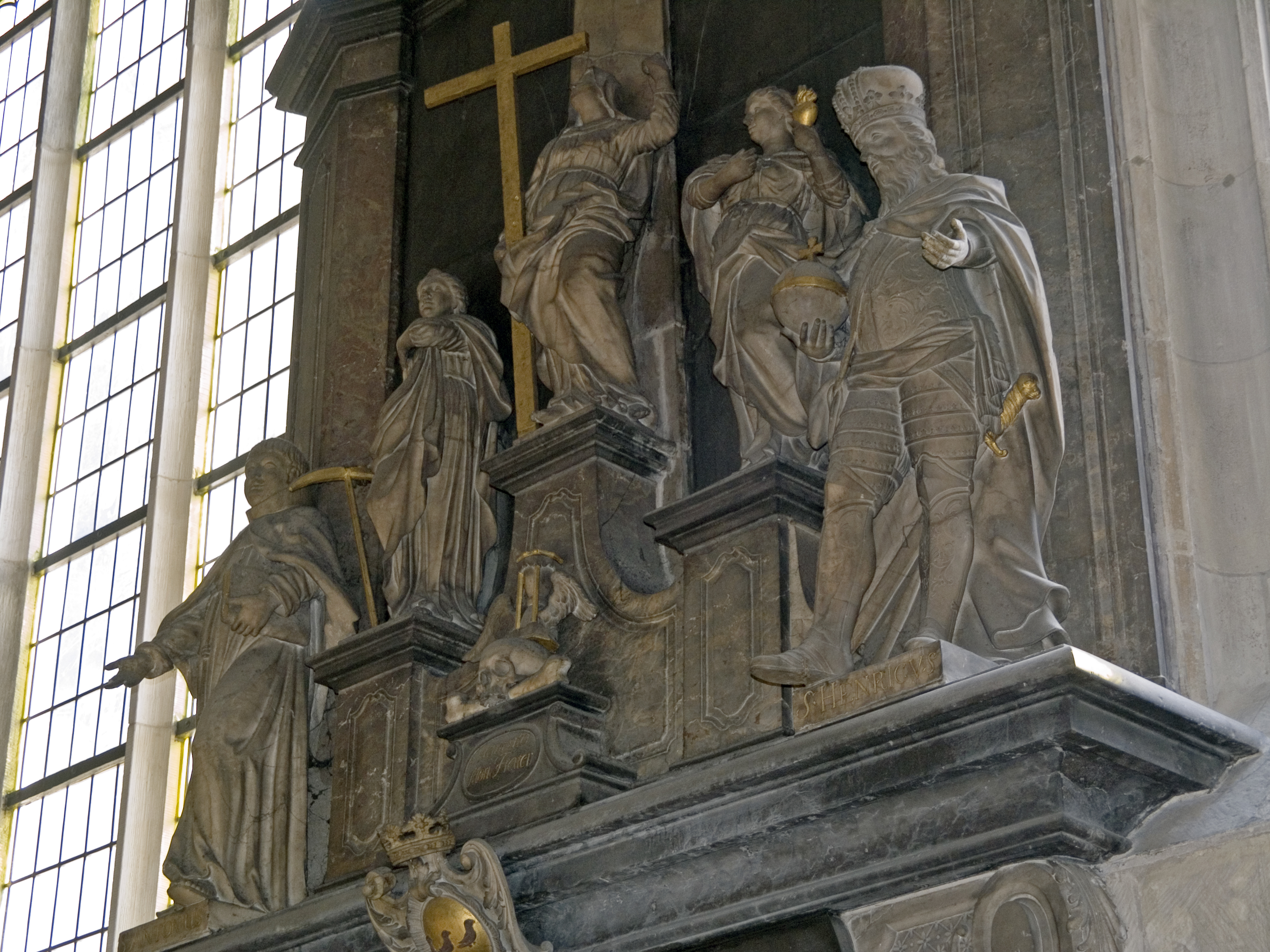
Von Velen's Epitaph

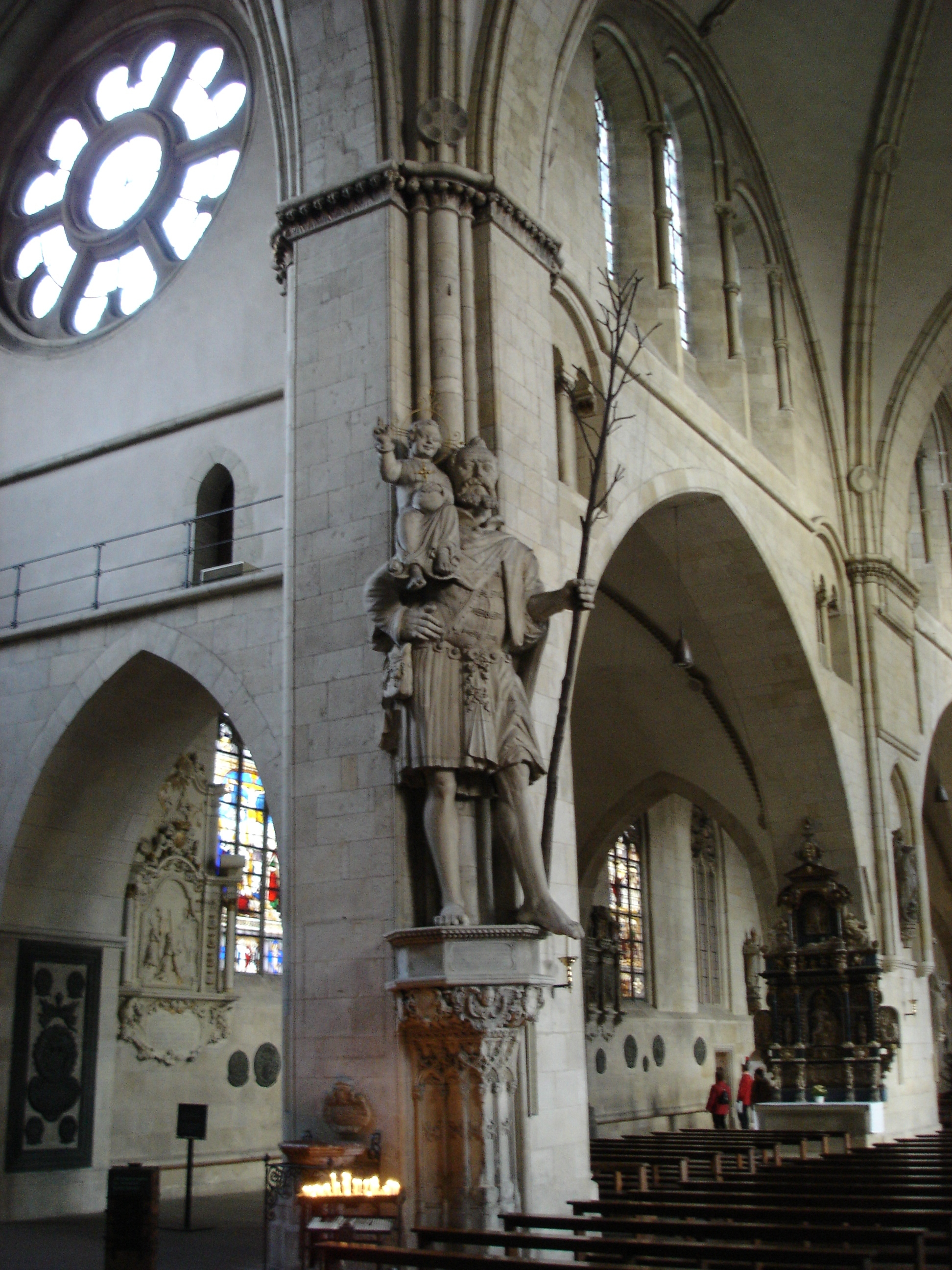
Christophorus-Statue and Blasius-Altar

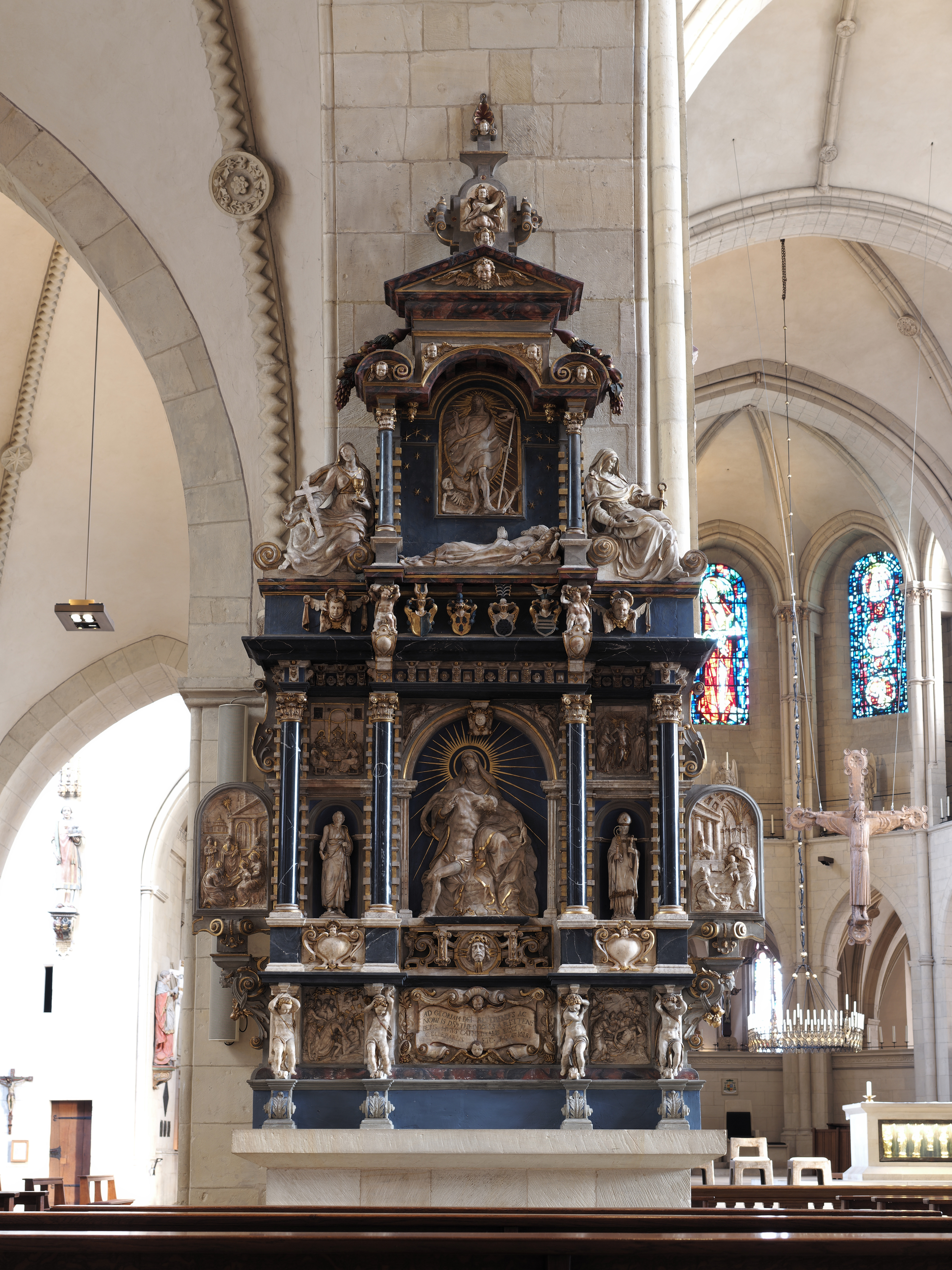
Blasius-Altar

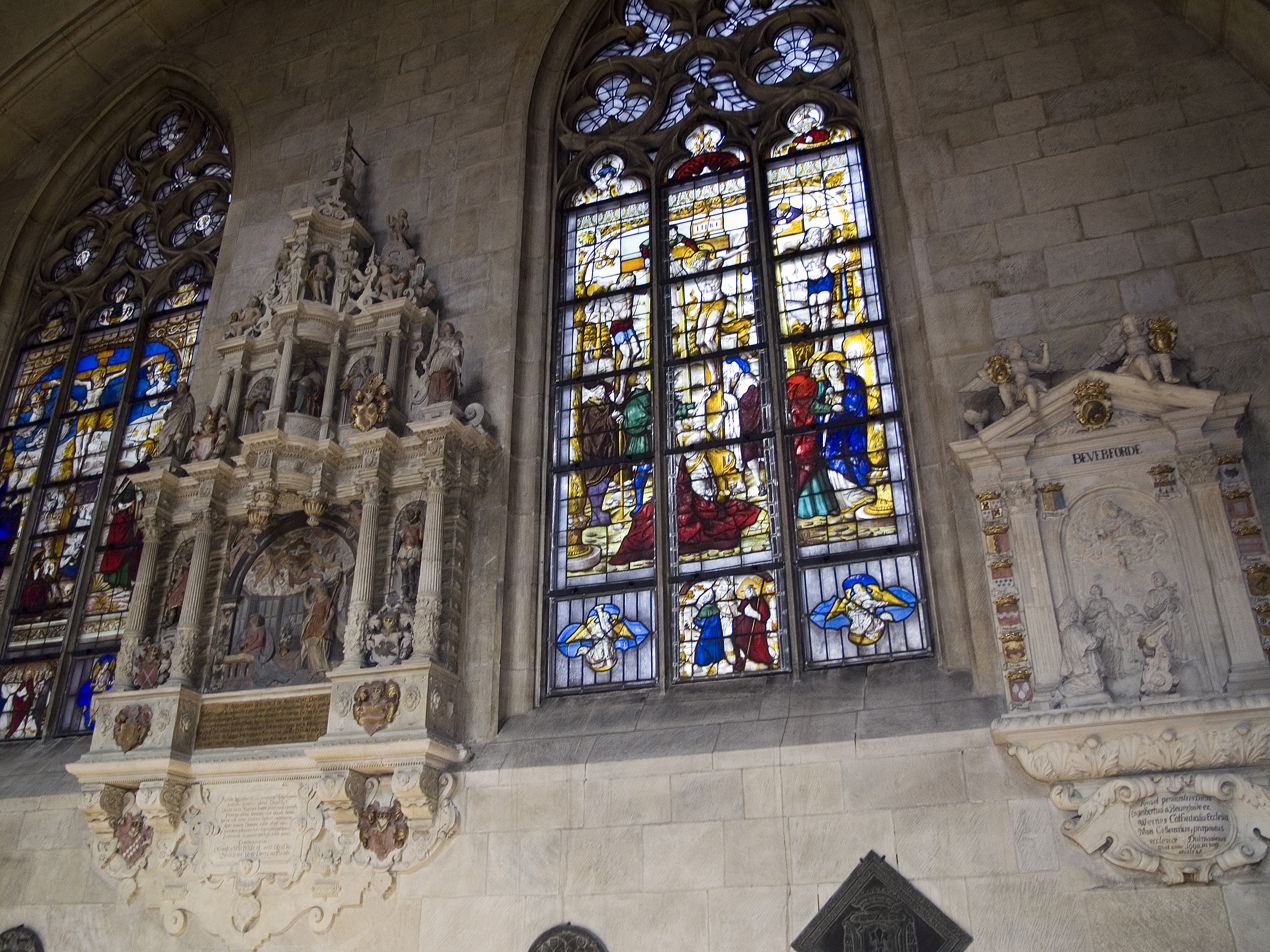
The Epitaph of Jodokus von Droste (left)

=== East transept ===
==== Van Büren Epitaph altar ====
In the south arm of the east transept is a painted stone relief (6.) depicting the Adoration of the Magi: in the centre is the Mother of God with the newborn Jesus in her lap taking a gift from the kneeling king Melchior. The king is depicted in the guise of Domherr Melchior van Büren, who donated the altar. Behind him stands King Caspar with a golden goblet prepared as a gift for the baby Jesus. King Balthasar is depicted as an African. He too stands behind the kneeling king Melchior. Joseph and the Apostle Bartholomew are included in the scene, as are two armed putti. The monument was created before 1534.

==== Tomb of von Plettenberg ====
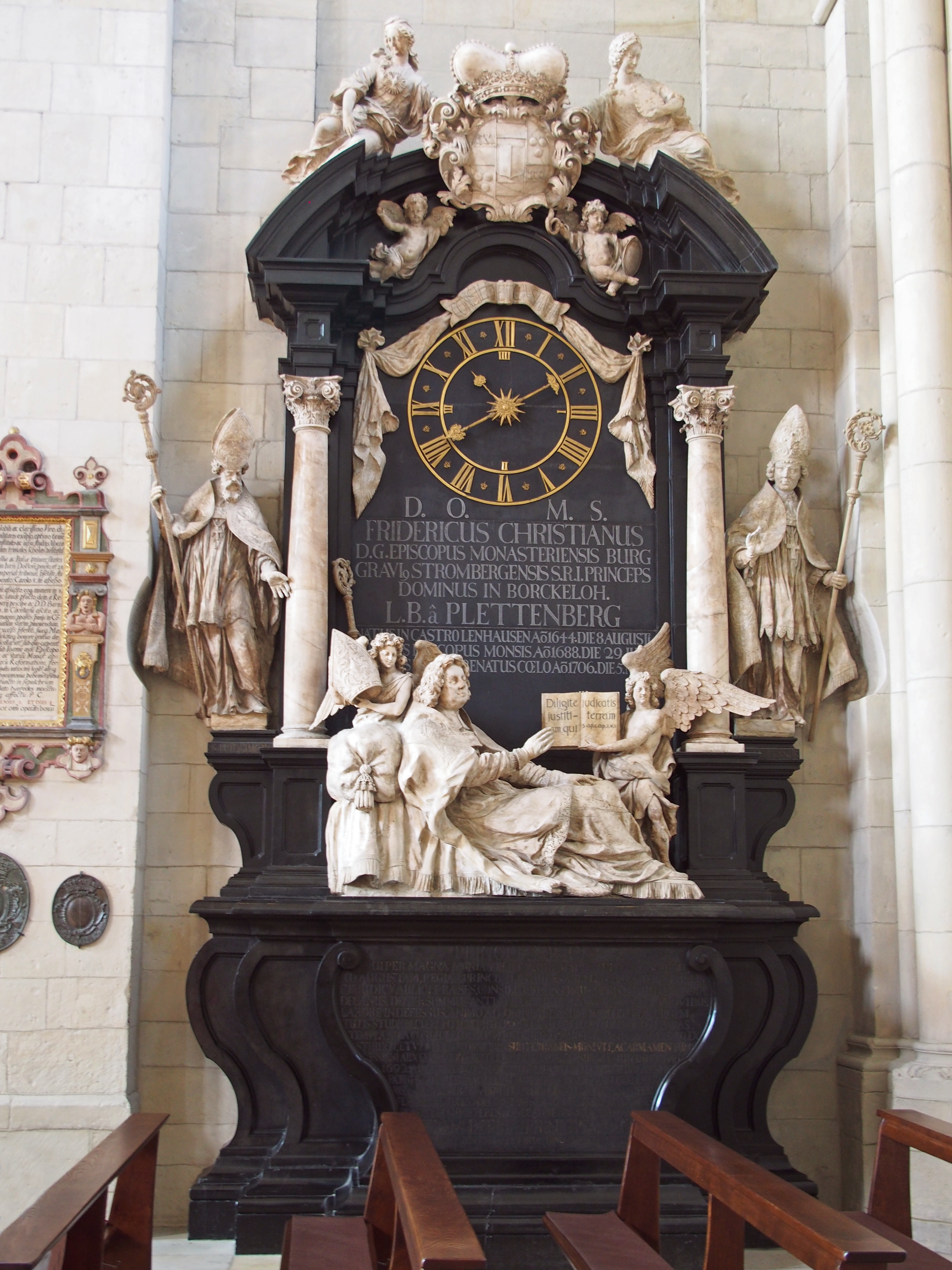
Tomb of Prince-Bishop von Plettenberg

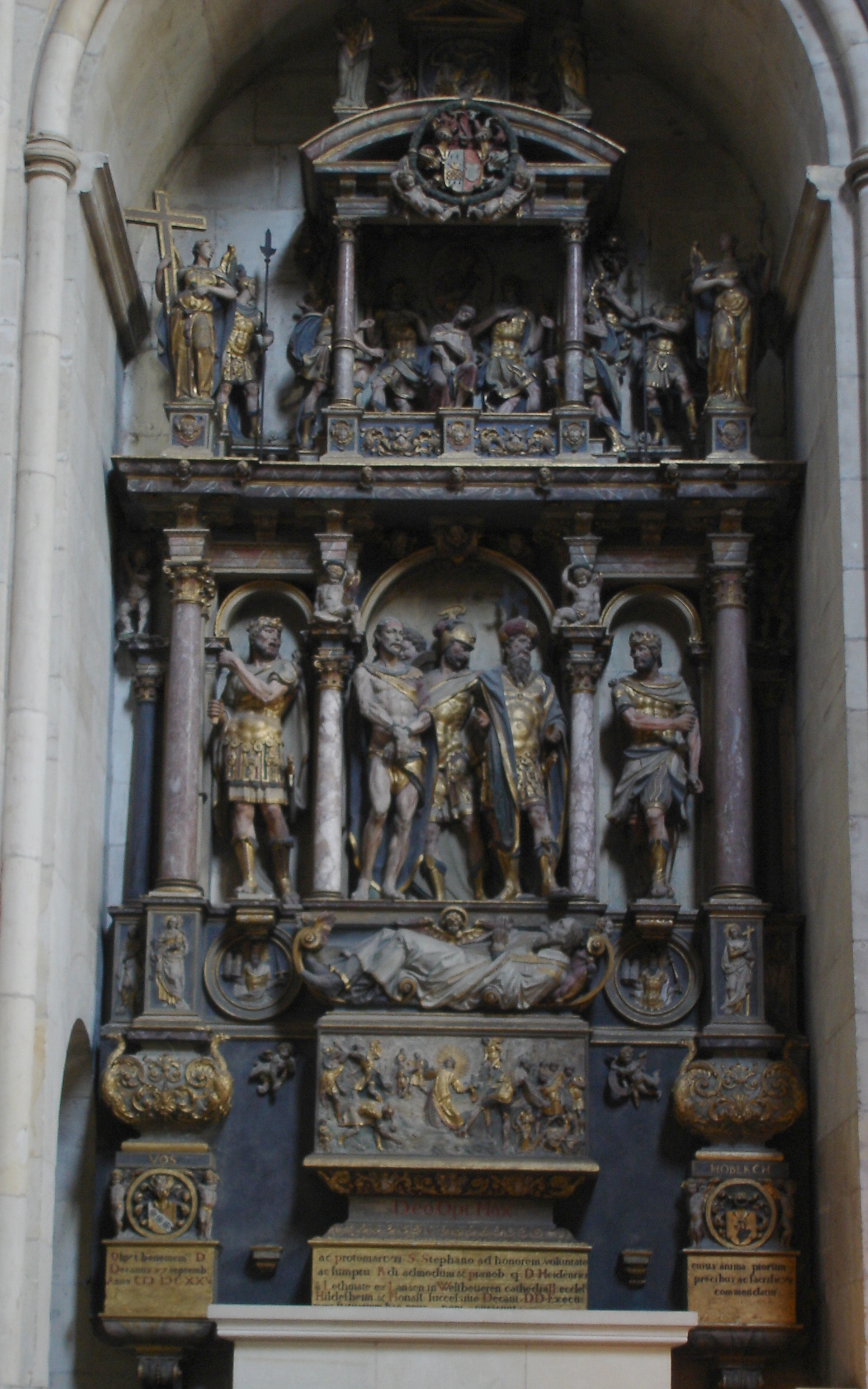
Stephanus-Altar

In the north arm of the east transept (the Stephanus-Choir) is the grave monument of Prince-Bishop Friedrich Christian von Plettenberg (8.). Following his death in May 1706, it was installed between 1707 and 1708 by the sculptor Johann Mauritz Gröninger.

The grave monument consists of a portico structure, flanked by statues of von Plettenberg's name saints in episcopal costume with mitres and croziers – St Frederick on the left and Bishop Christian on the right. In the centre of the monument is a sarcophagus with the image of the Prince-Bishop on top of it. The prince's arms are displayed above the portico structure by putti. Von Plettenberg's titles and honours are inscribed on the front and back of the sarcophagus.

The image of the Prince-Bishop on top of the sarcophagus is in a half-sitting, half-lying position with his head looking slightly upwards. At his feet stands an angel with an open book. Originally the words "Diligite iustitiam, qui iudicatis terram" (Favour justice, you who pass judgement on the world: Wisdom 1.1.) were inscribed in the book. Behind the cardinal stands a second heavenly servant, holding the insignia of the Prince-Bishop.

In the upper part of the marble structure is a large clock. It is surrounded by drapery and a banner with the words "Consilio et Constantia" ("By Counsel and Constancy"). The clock itself was made by the clockmaker Joachim Münnig and painted by Wolff Heinrich Schmorck.

The monument is made of black and white marble. It originally stood in the High Choir, behind the astronomical clock – the two clocks were intended to use the same mechanism. Today it is located on the west wall of the east transept.

==== Pestkreuz ====
On the east wall of the Stephanus-Choir is a 14th-century processional cross. It is known as the "Pestkreuz" (Plague Cross), because it is believed that the sufferings of plague c. 1350 are reflected in the depiction of the woeful crucified Christ depicted on it.

The wooden cross and the statue of Jesus were made together. Jesus' face is wrought with cares and shows the signs of suffering. His half-opened eyes are swollen, his cheeks sunken, his lips slightly open. His emaciated body hangs from the cross.

On the back side of the statue there are two niches – one between the shoulder blades, the other larger one near the pelvis. They are now empty, but presumably originally held relics.

==== St. Liborius ====
In the Johannes-Choir, opposite the astronomical clock, is a lifesize figure of St Liborius. The saint is depicted in the costume of a bishop. In his left hand he holds a book with three stones, as patron saint of kidney stones. In his right hand he holds a gilt wooden crozier.

An old tradition is connected to the crozier, according to which, at the death of a diocesan bishop, Liborius' staff is placed at the dead man's feet. His successor must provide Liborius with a new staff. This tradition began during the Thirty Years' War (1618–1648). At that time, the Domherrs of Paderborn sent their reliquaries to Münster, to protect them from robbery and arson. During their time in Münster are meant to have miraculously spared the city from the contemporaneous destruction. For this reason, the Domherr of Münster, Johann Wilhelm von Sintzig donated the state of St Liborius to the cathedral after the signing of the Peace of Westphalia in 1648. Since then, each bishop is interred with the statue's crozier and his successor has to acquire a new one. This is to be an exact successor of its predecessor, made of Linden wood, with layers of chalk applied and decorated with gold leaf and oil paints.

=== High choir ===
==== Triumphal Cross ====
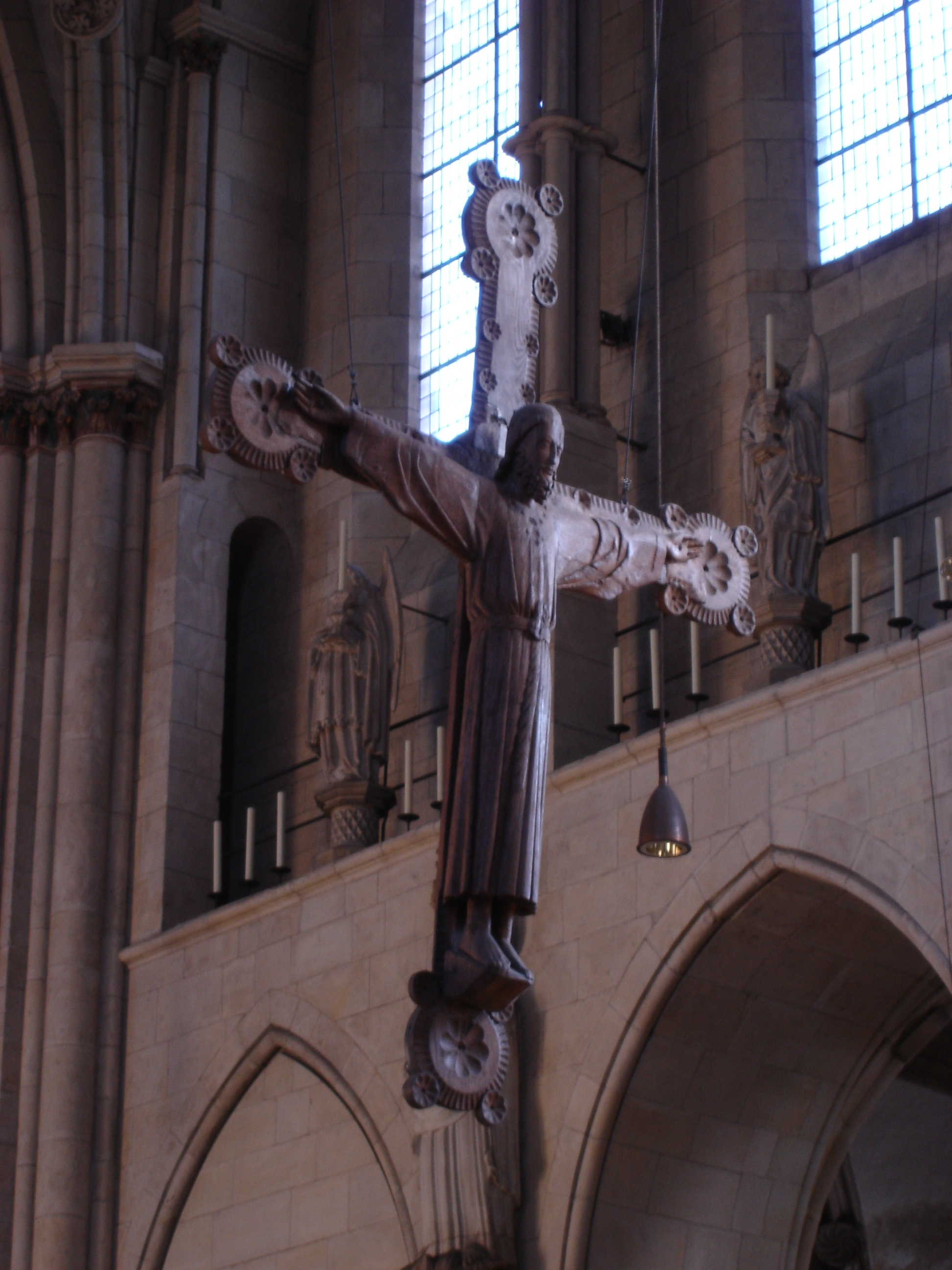
Triumphal cross

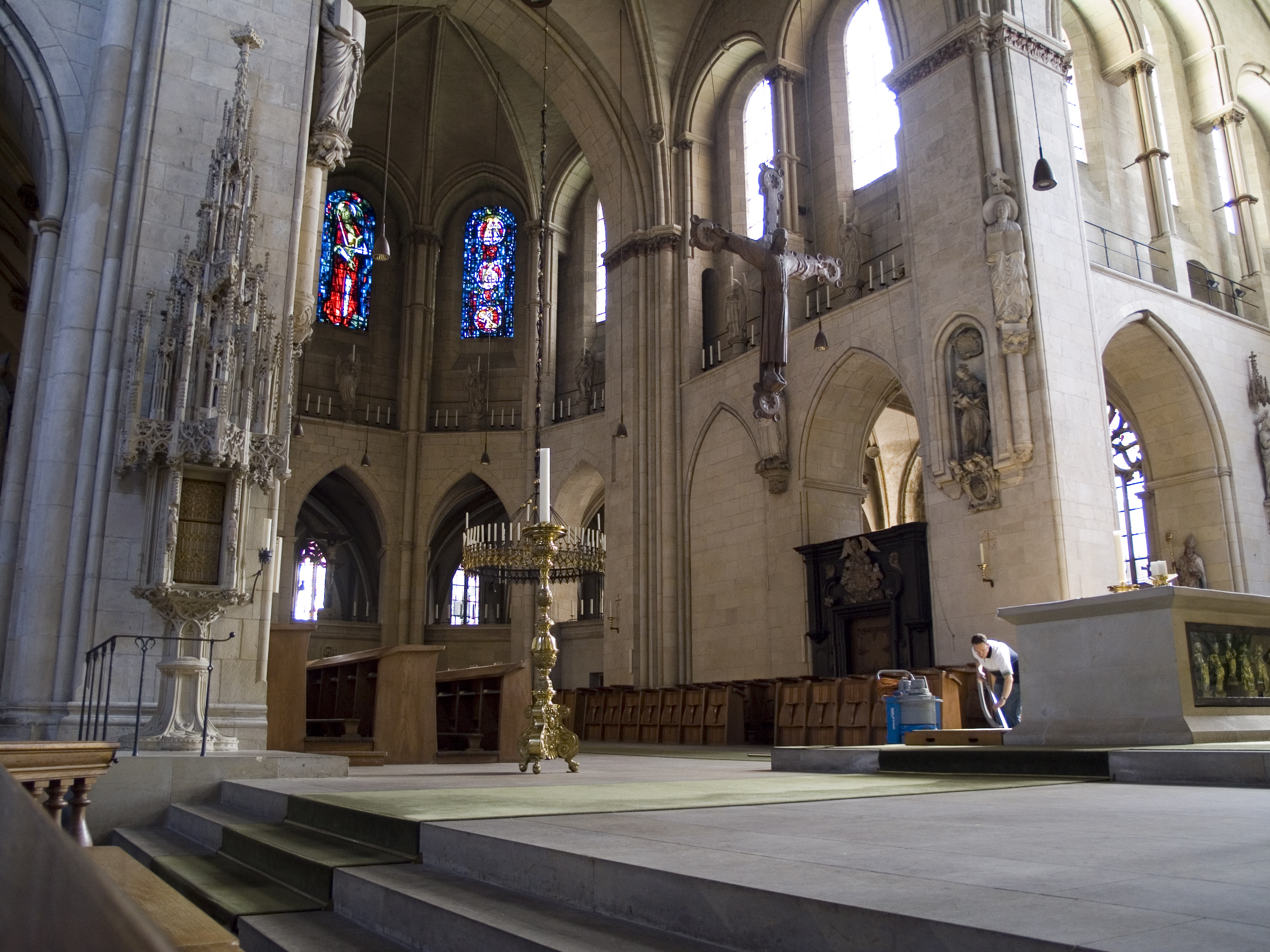
View into the choir. Rear of the astronomical clock at right under the triumphal cross. At left: tabernacle.

The Triumphal Cross (German: Triumphkreuz, 10.) is a monumental wooden crucifix, which hangs above the main altar in the high choir. It shows Jesus being crucified as continuous redeemer of sins, dressed like the risen Christ in a long, belted tunic shaped into grooved parallel folds. Christ is depicted in hieratic symmetry. Head, body, legs and feet are completely vertical, the arms extend absolutely horizontally. His open palms are nailed to the cross. His feet stand on a Suppedaneum and are not nailed. Jesus' bearded head appears solemn, with his eyes directed at the viewer. On the collar and chest of his high priestly gown are carvings imitating gemstones. The figure must have originally worn a crown, but this has been lost. This depiction is based on the vision of John of Patmos in the Book of Revelation (similem Filio hominis, vestitum podere, et precinctum ad mamillas zona aurea – "A likeness of the Son of man, dressed in the poderes with a golden belt tied round his breast," Rev 1:13).

The crucifix, also known as "Volto Santo" dates to the late 13th century. Cross and corpus are made of oak. The figure is c. 2.22 m high, his armspan is 1.98 m. The cross itself is 3.55 m high, 2.62 m wide and about 3 cm deep.

The Triumphal cross has only hung in the high choir of the cathedral as the altar cross since 1973. Before that it hung in the cloisters and was in poor condition. Parts of the arms of the cross and the ends of the arms had disappeared, and the figure was cracked. In 1973 and 1974, the cross was restored in Osnabrück, using photographs. In the course of the restoration, the lost ends of the arms were reconstructed. Whether the eight-petalled rosette pattern on the ends existed on the original is uncertain. Originally the crucifix was painted, but only a few traces still remain today. It is mounted on steel rods in its back side, which is undecorated because the work was originally designed as a wall hanging.

==== Further items ====
- The modern high altar (10.) is located under the crossing. It is made of sandstone and is shaped as a simple block. A lit vitrine is enclosed in its front side, in which the historic apostle statues from the old gothic high altar are displayed.
- In front of the northeastern crossing pillar is a Gothic filagreed Sakramentshaus (Tabernacle, 11.)
- In the centre of the high choir hangs a large wheel chandelier (13.).
- Halfway up the crossing pillars on the altar island are more-than-life-size stone statues of the Four Evangelists, who face towards all the cardinal directions, proclaiming the good news.
- Further statues of saints stand in the high choir. They symbolise the presence of the saints at the Eucharist. In addition to statues of the Mother of God, Joseph and the church's patron Paul (with a sword), there are stone statues of the twelve apostles, holding candlesticks, below the upper level of windows in the high choir.
- The bishop's seat, the cathedra is shaped like a professorial chair, which symbolises the instructional role of the bishop.

=== Ambulatory ===
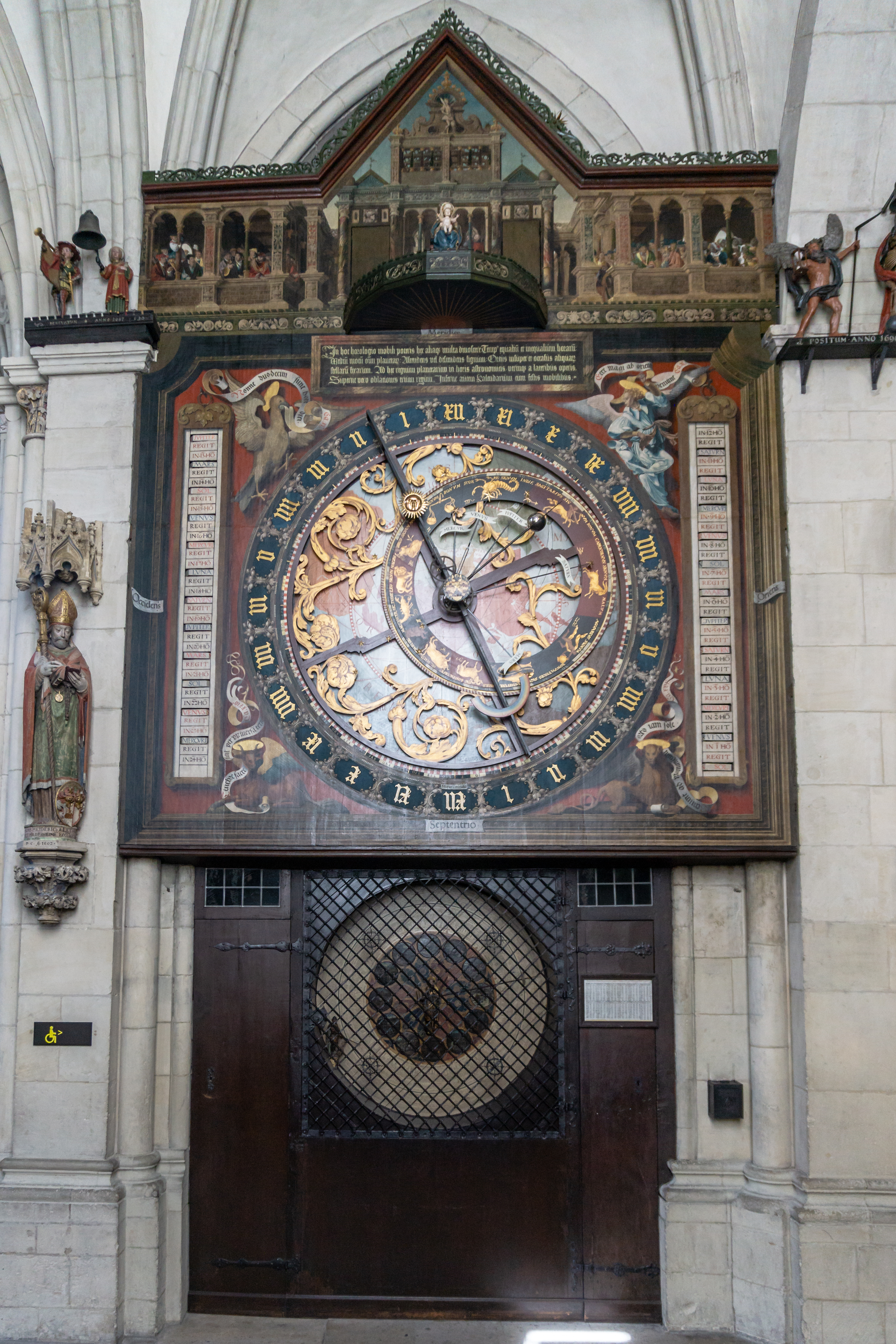
Astronomical clock

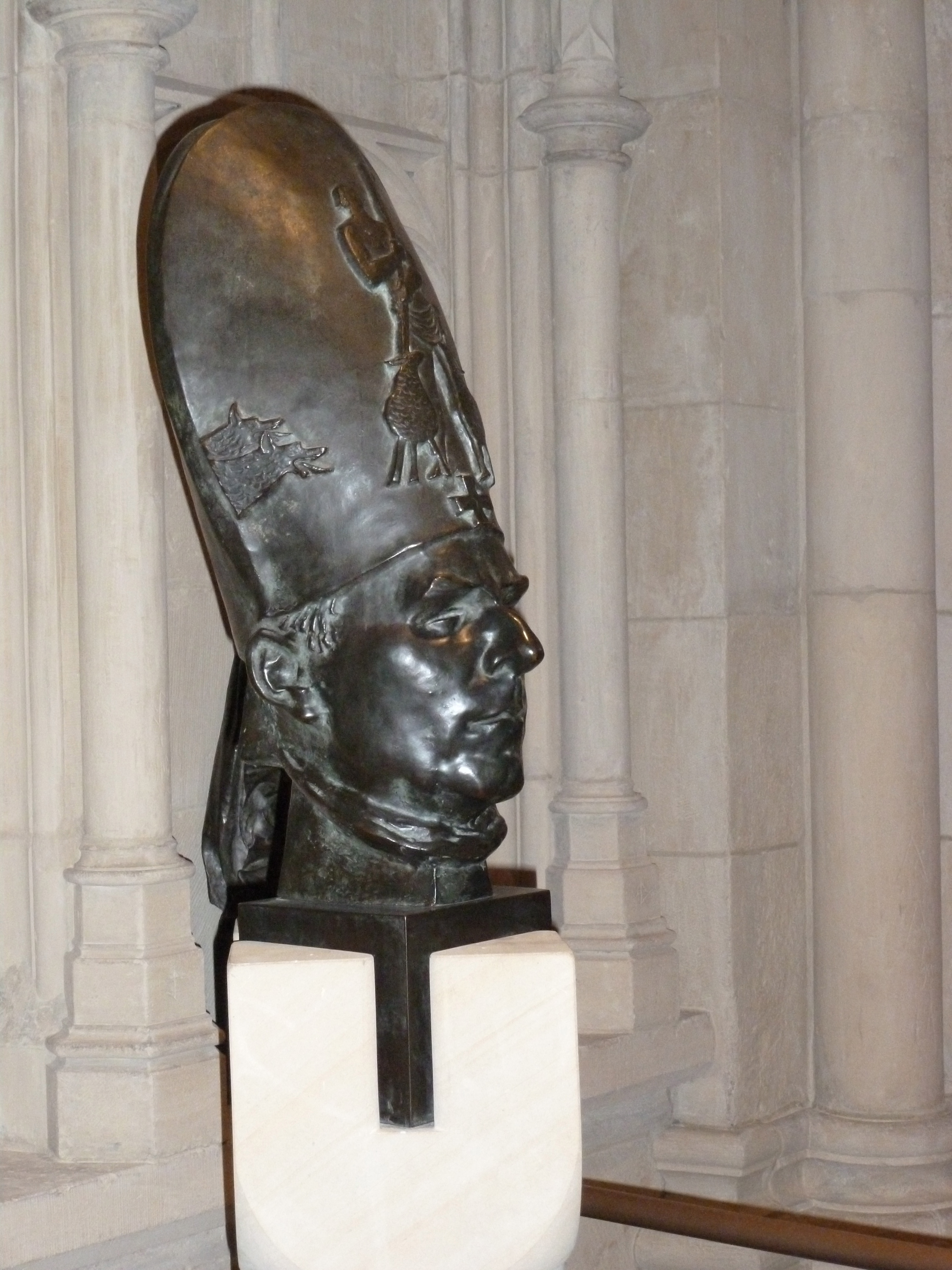
Bust of Cardinal von Galen

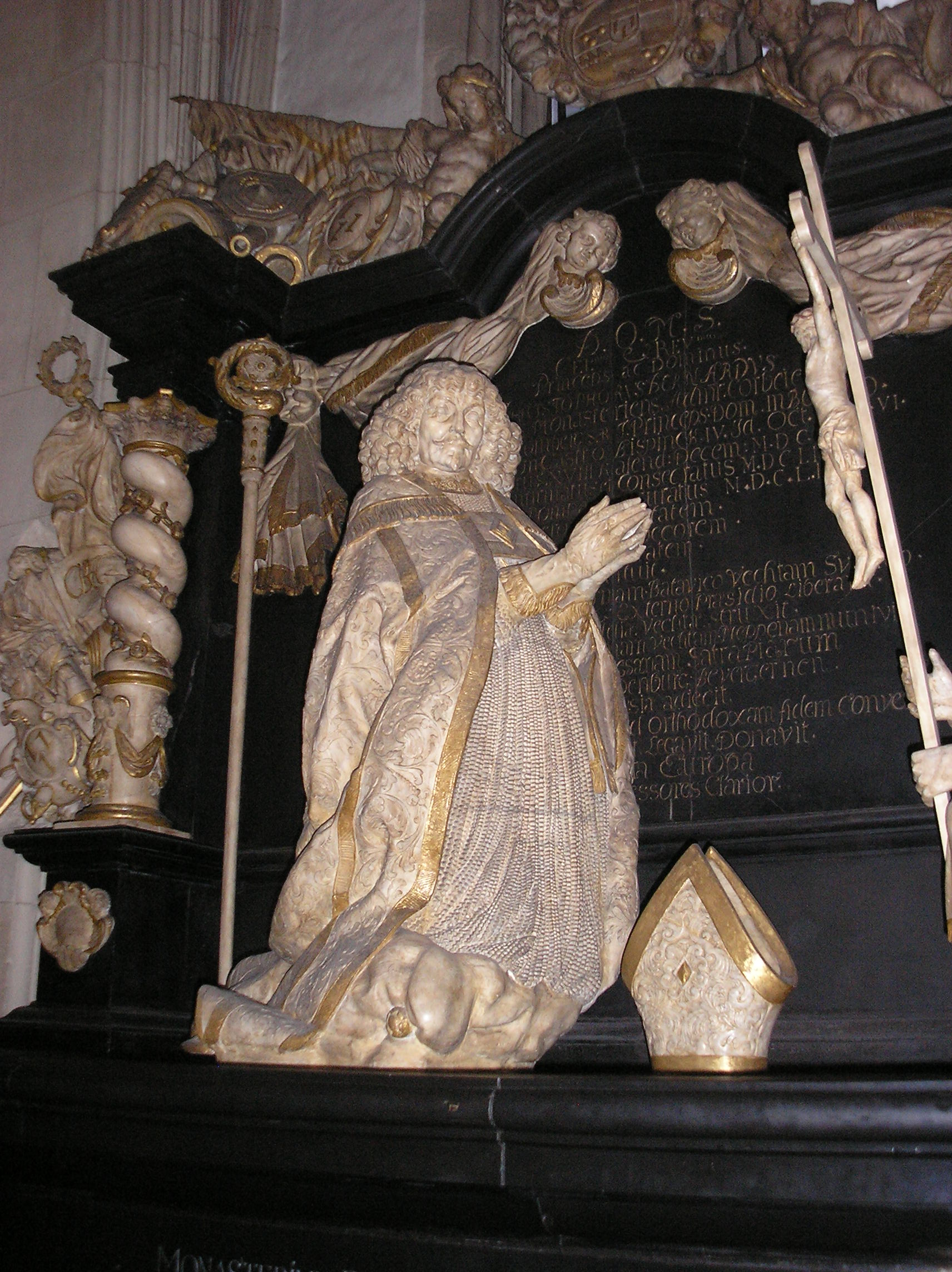
Josephskapelle: The Tomb of Christoph Bernhard von Galen

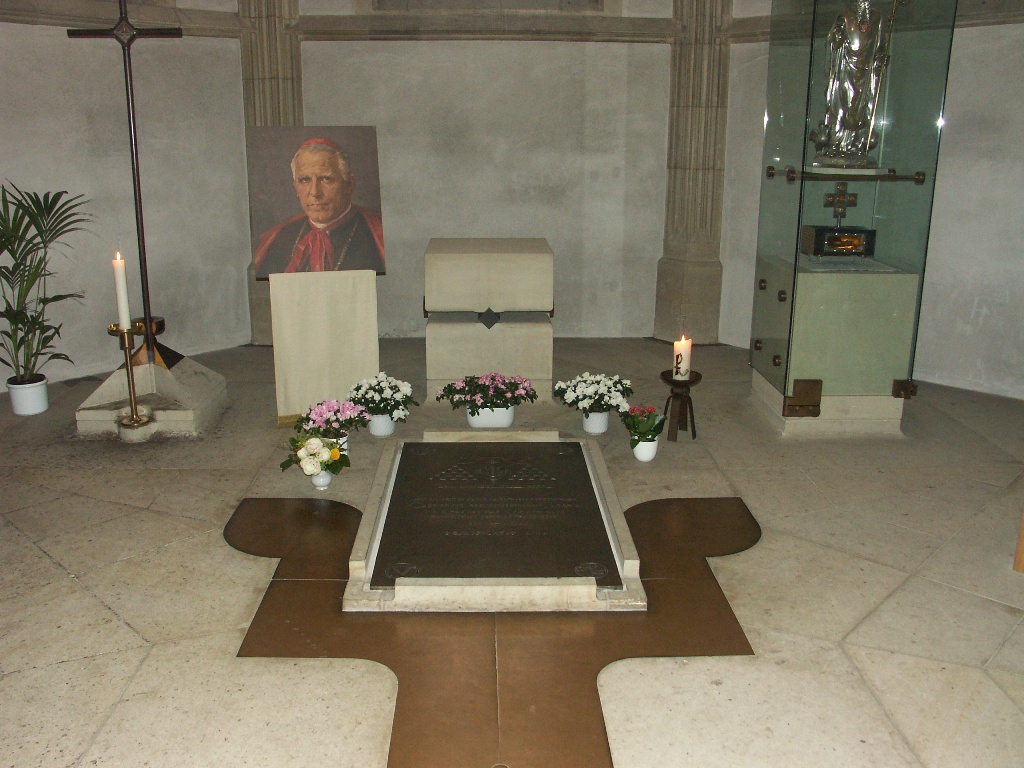
Tomb of Cardinal von Galen

==== Astronomical clock ====
The astronomical clock was built between 1540 and 1542, replacing an earlier astronomical clock of 1408. It has a ten-bell chime which can be operated from the cathedral organ, and automata which move at the quarter hour. The main dial is an astrolabe, the lower dial is a calendar.

==== Statue of St Anthony ====
The ambulatory of the cathedral contains a statue of Saint Anthony of Padua, dressed as a Franciscan friar, with the baby Jesus in his arms. The saint looks at the child, smiling, and Jesus looks back at him.

The sculpture was made by court sculptor Johann Mauritz Gröninger of Münster. It was originally located in an abbey in Münster and came into the possession of the cathedral only in 1907 as the result of a (private) donation. The statue is dated to around 1675.

==== Stations of the Cross ====
In the niches of the walls of the choir screen are 15 stations of the cross (14.), which were made by the artist Bert Gerresheim of Düsseldorf) between 1995 and 1996. They are bronze sculptures in the round. They are special because modern-day individuals and important people from the diocese's history are depicted in the stations, including Karl Leisner, Sister Maria Euthymia, Niels Stensen, Anna Katharina Emmerick, Clemens August von Galen, Pope John Paul II and Mother Teresa.

==== Bust of Cardinal von Galen ====
At the back wall of the high choir stands a pedestal with a bronze bust of Cardinal Clemens August von Galen (15.). It is a reproduction – the original was made in 1950 by sculptor Edwin Scharff for the foyer of the diocese's archives. The Cardinal is depicted with a mitre decorated with an image of the Good Shepherd. Source material for the bust included, among other things, the cardinal's death mask.

The reproduction was made in 1976 for the 30th anniversary of the Cardinal's death. It initially stood on a stone corbel in the burial chapel. When Pope John Paul II visited in 1987, the burial chapel was remodelled and the bust was moved out of the chapel to a location with a view of the chapel. The bust and tomb are linked by a bronze plate in the floor.

==== Ivory crucifix ====
In the Maximuskapelle is an ivory crucifix (18.), on permanent loan from a private owner. The sculpture was produced by Flemish artist Francois Duquesnoy (1597–1643).

==== Tomb of Christoph B. von Galen ====
The tomb of Prince-Bishop Christoph Bernhard von Galen (19.) is located in the St. Josephskapelle, the furthest east of the chapels built by him on the ambulatory. The monument was made by court sculptor Johann Mauritz Gröninger. Construction was begun during the life of the Prince-Bishop and was completed in 1679, the year after his death. The monument sits on a massive podium, with a marble statue of the Prince-Bishop kneeling on a cushion, venerating a crucifix which an angel holds in front of him. The Prince-Bishop is shown dressed in a surplice and a pluvial, with his crozier propped up behind him and his mitre on the floor in front of him.

==== Tomb of Cardinal von Galen ====
The tomb of Clemens August Graf von Galen (20.) is located in the southeast Galen chapel off the ambulatory, the Ludgeruskapelle. It consists of a grave plate made by South Tyrol sculptor Siegfried Moroder. It bears the following inscription:

Hic exspectat resurrectionem mortuorum Clemens Augustinus de Galen S.R.E. presbyter cardinalis episcopus Monasteriensis

Translation:

Here Clemens August von Galen S.R.E. cardinal priest and bishop of Münster awaits the resurrection of the dead

==== Further items ====
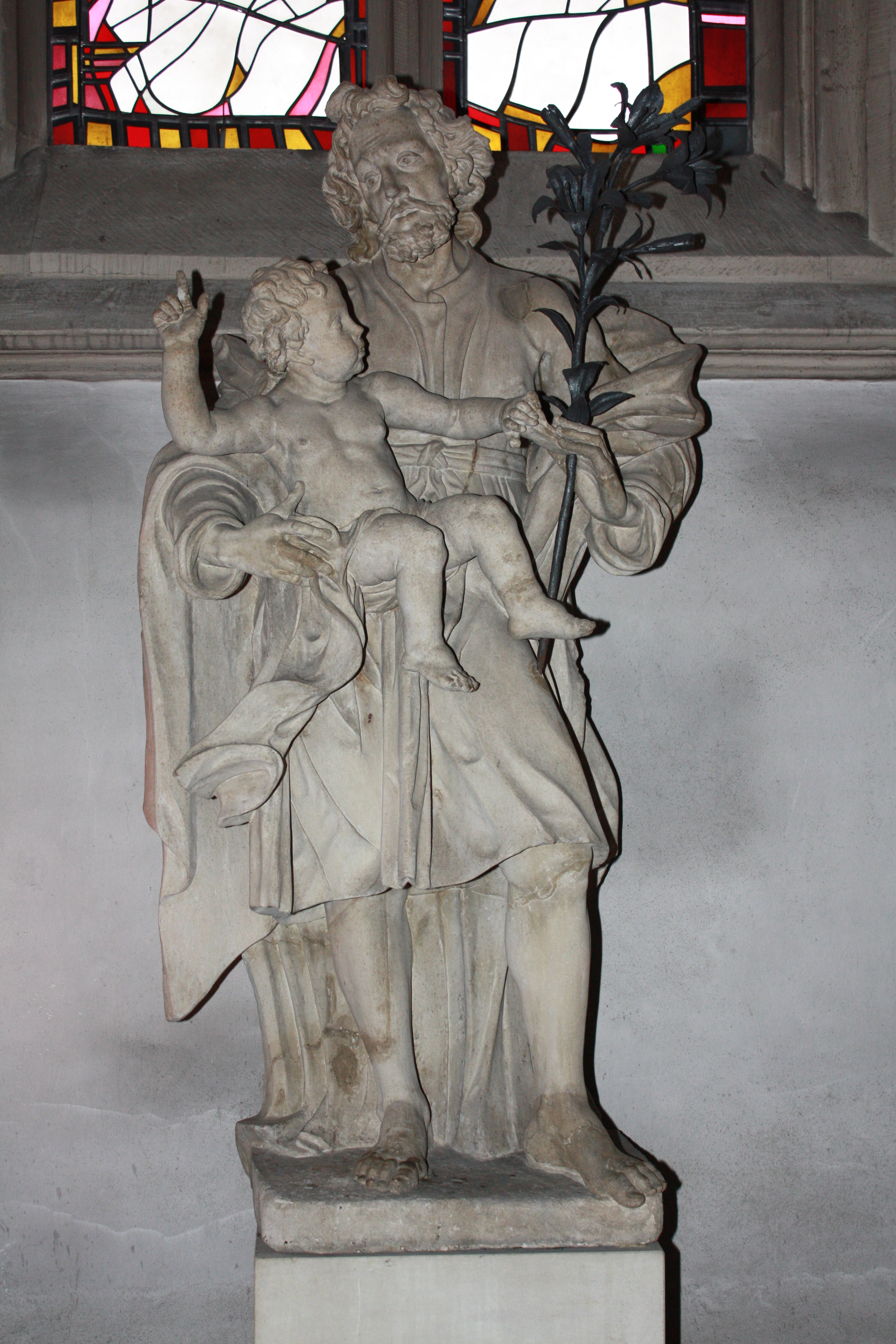
Josephskapelle: Statue of St. Joseph, originally a pedimental sculpture on one of the farm buildings of Marienfeld Abbey

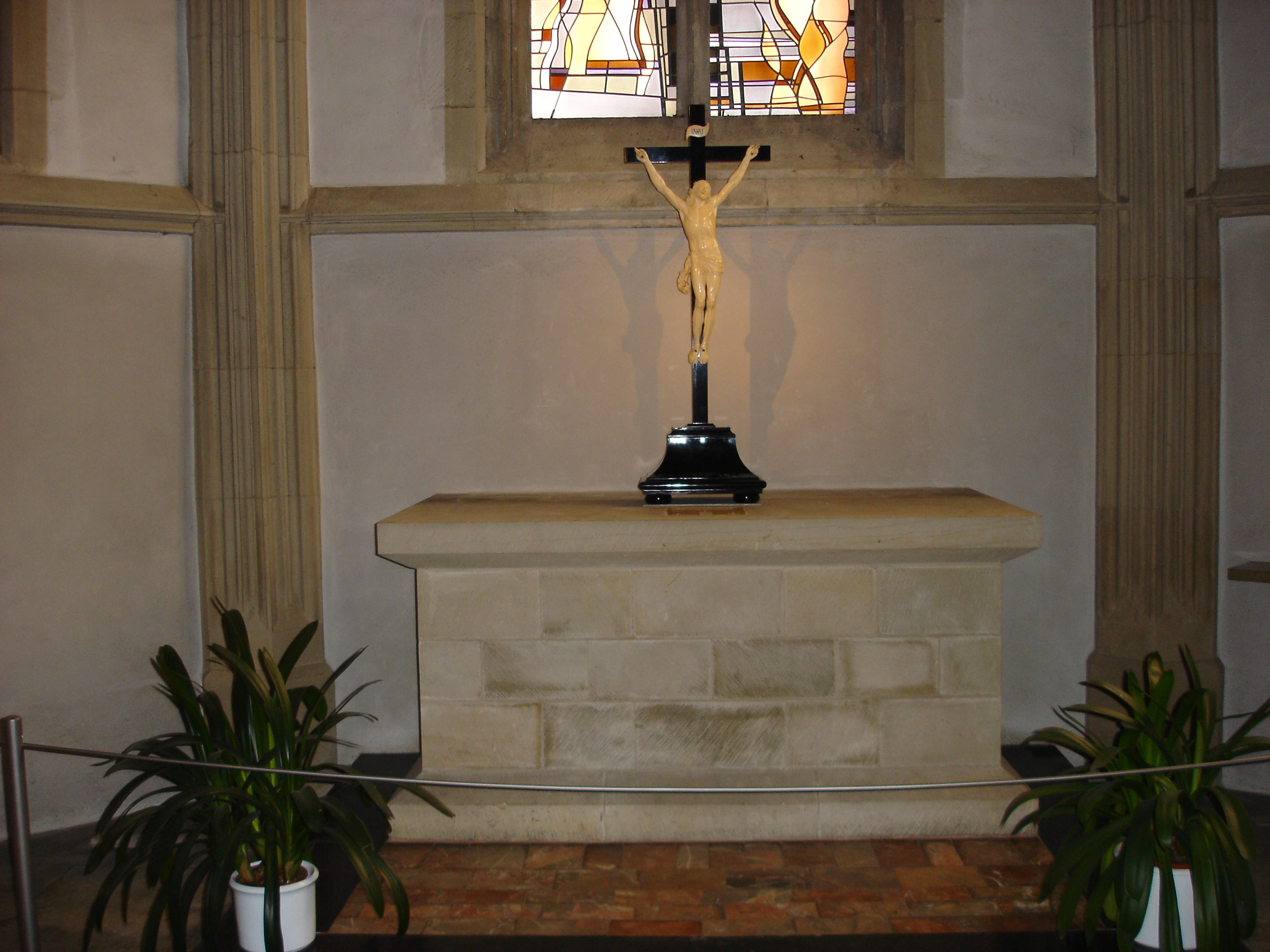
Maximuskapelle: Ivory crucifix

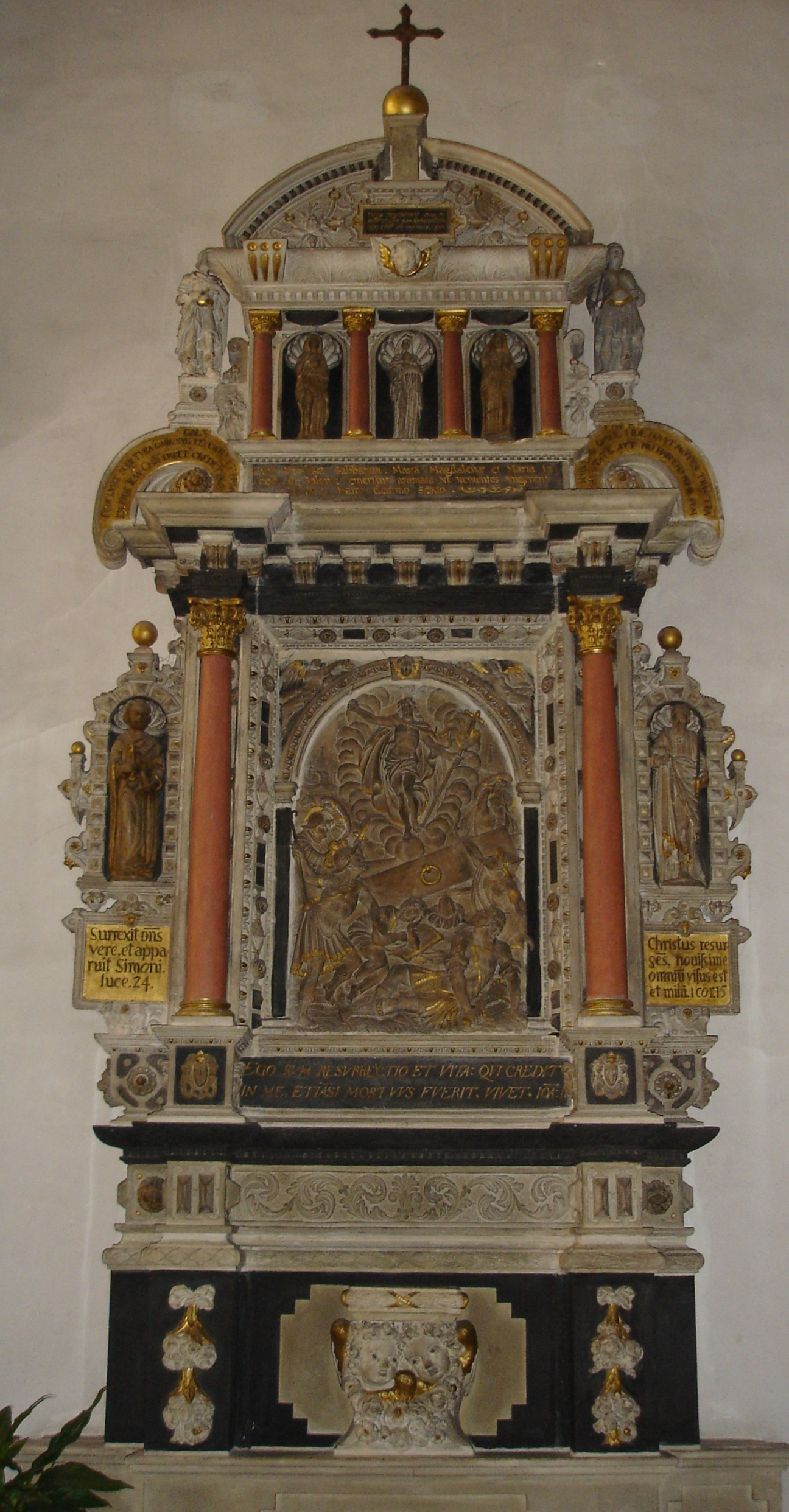
Maximuskapelle: Sebastian's altar

=== Cloisters ===
==== Der Bettler ====
In the cathedral cloisters is a bronze sculpture called "Der Bettler" ("The Beggar", 23.). The sculpture is an over-life-size depiction of an emaciated man on crutches, looking up towards heaven. The original sculpture was made by Ernst Barlach in 1930 in connection with plans for a sculptural cycle for the facade of the St. Catherine's Church in Lübeck, inspired by the concept of "Community of the Saints"; it was not meant to be a traditional depiction of a saint, but a depiction of human fundamentals.

The sculpture in the cathedral is one of eight copies produced in 1979–1980. The roughly 2.17 m high figure was originally in the St. Laurentius Kirche in Herne before being donated to the cathedral.

=== Crucifixion group ===
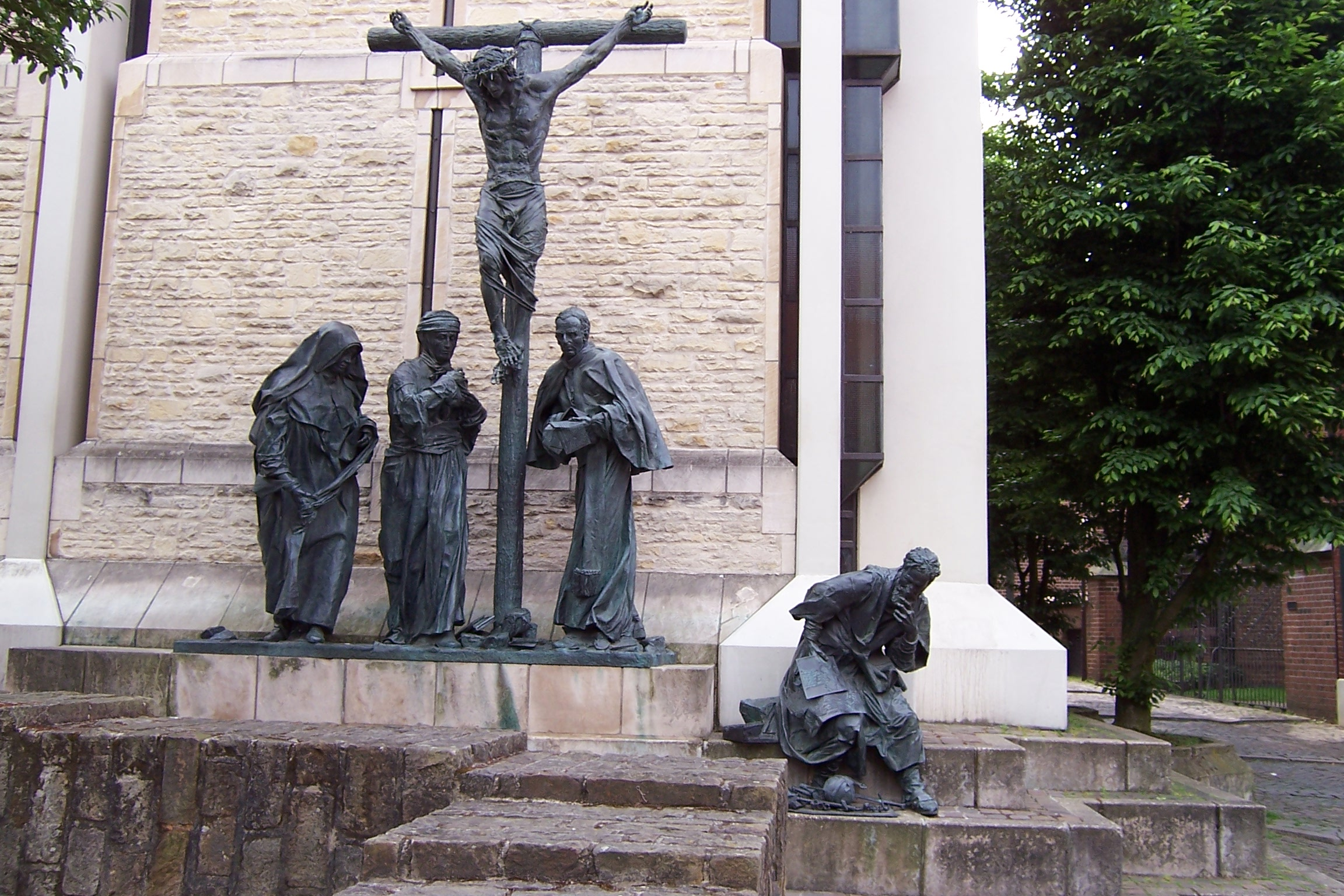
Crucifixion group

North of the cathedral, on the Horsteberg hill, behind the cathedral treasury, is a new bronze crucifixion group by Bert Gerresheim of Düsseldorf, which was installed in 2004. Until then, a sandstone crucifixion group from the first half of the eighteenth century stood on the same site, which had been severely damaged by weathering and vandalism.

Unlike most depictions of the scene on Golgotha, the sculpture does not show Mary and John under the cross, but figures from later history. The blessed Anne Catherine Emmerich and the blessed sister Maria Euthymia stand below the cross, with Cardinal von Galen opposite them, holding the notes from his sermon "Wachrufe in einer politisch gefährlichen Welt" (Wake-up calls in a politically dangerous world). At the foot of the cross is a stone (German: Stein) with the seal of the Carmelite order, a reference to St Edith Stein. Separated from them is a sitting figure of the Anabaptist king John of Leiden, along with a mass of broken signs and symbols (the Swastika, the star of David, the Hammer and Sickle, etc.), which are meant to indicate the hard times of human history.

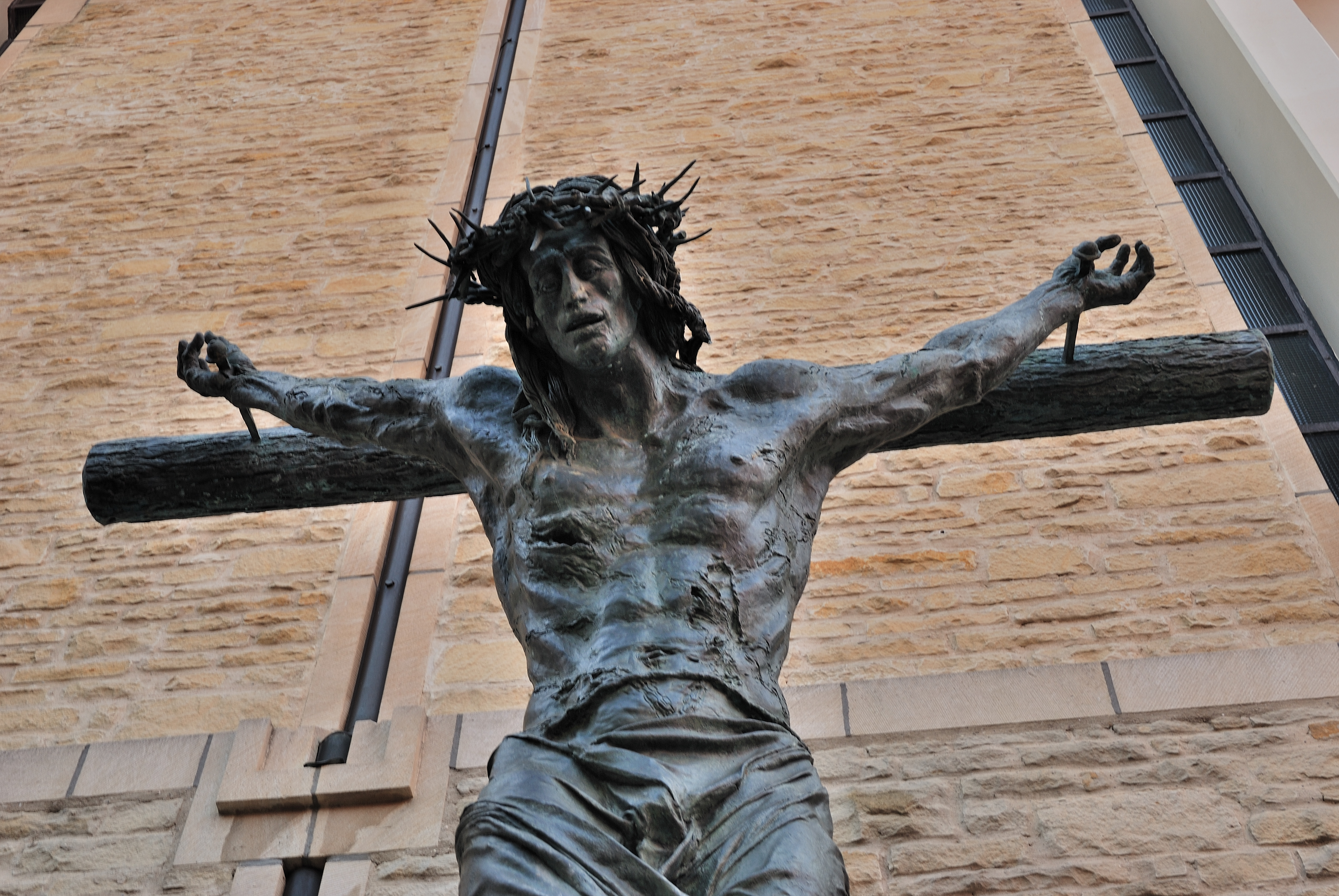
Christ on the cross

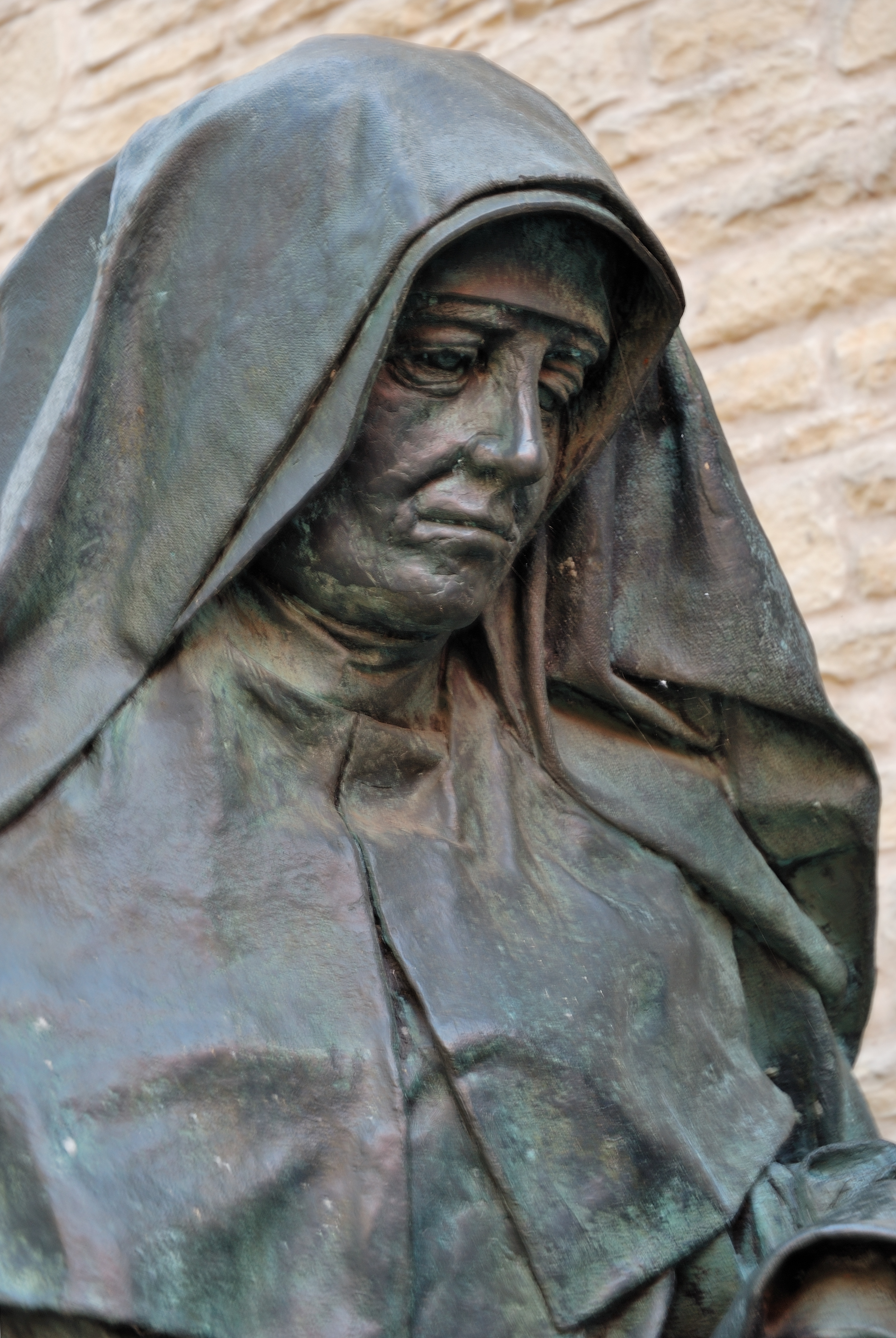
Sister Maria Euthymia

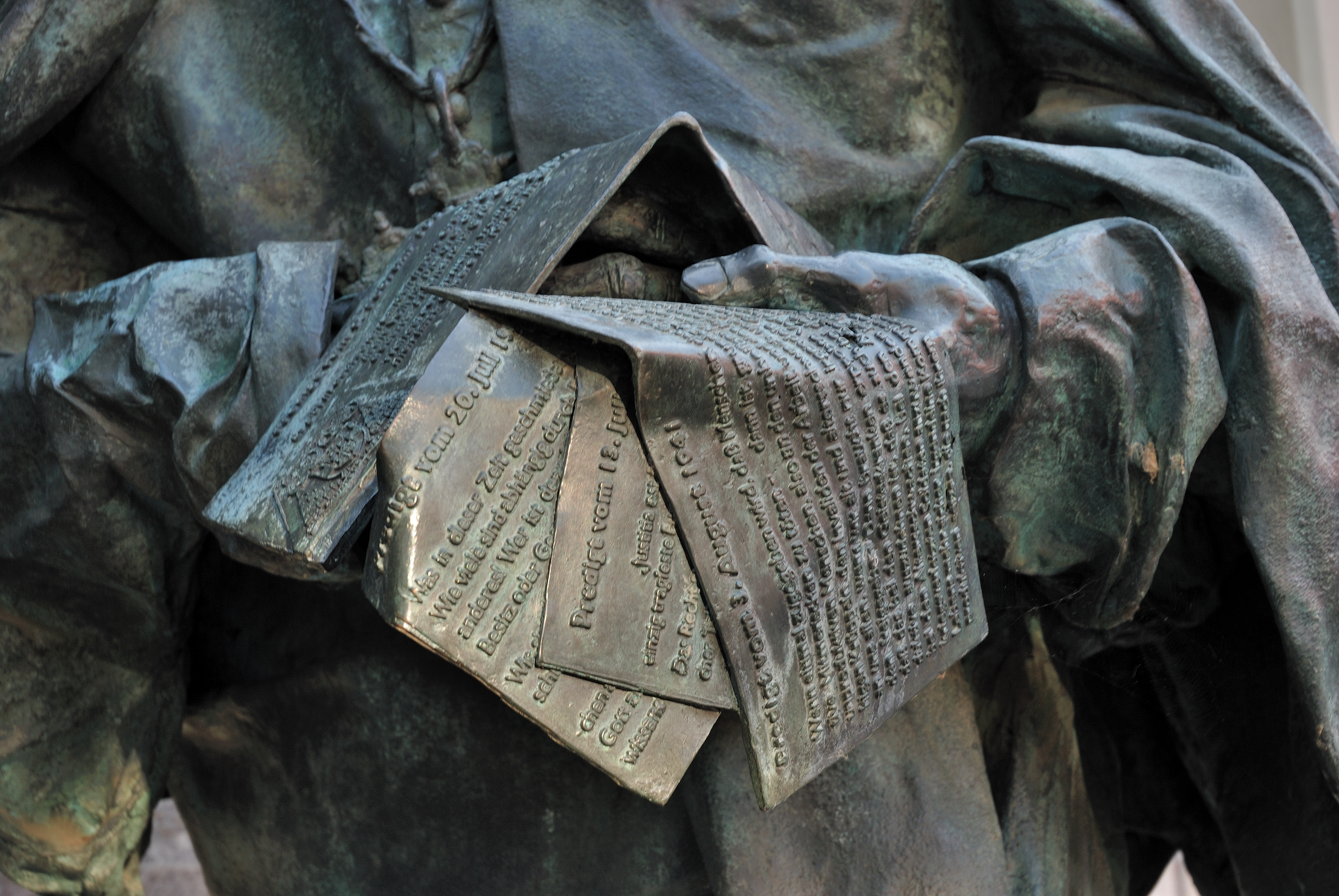
Detail: Sermon notes in Cardinal von Galen's hands

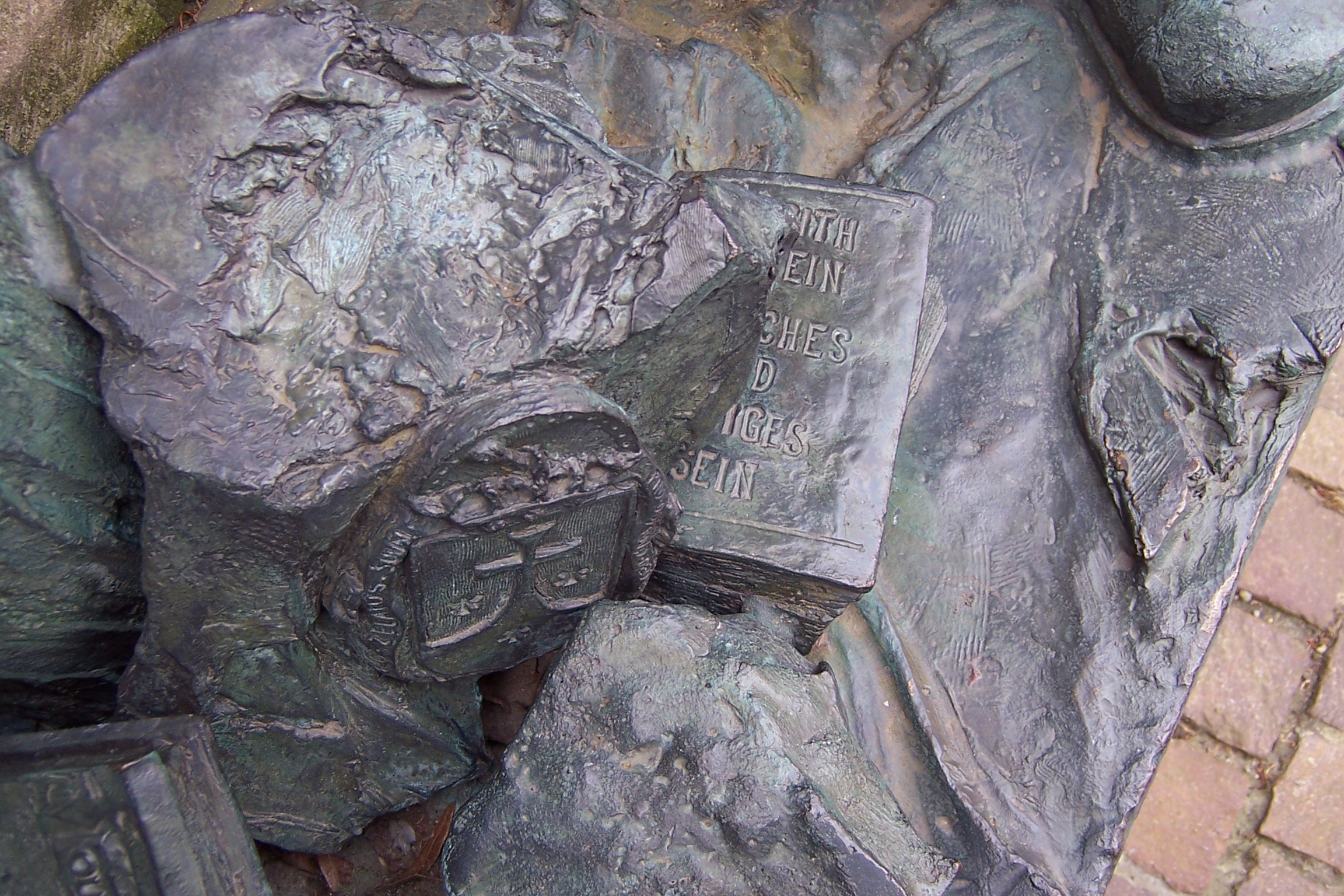
Detail: Carmelite seal, referencing St Edith Stein

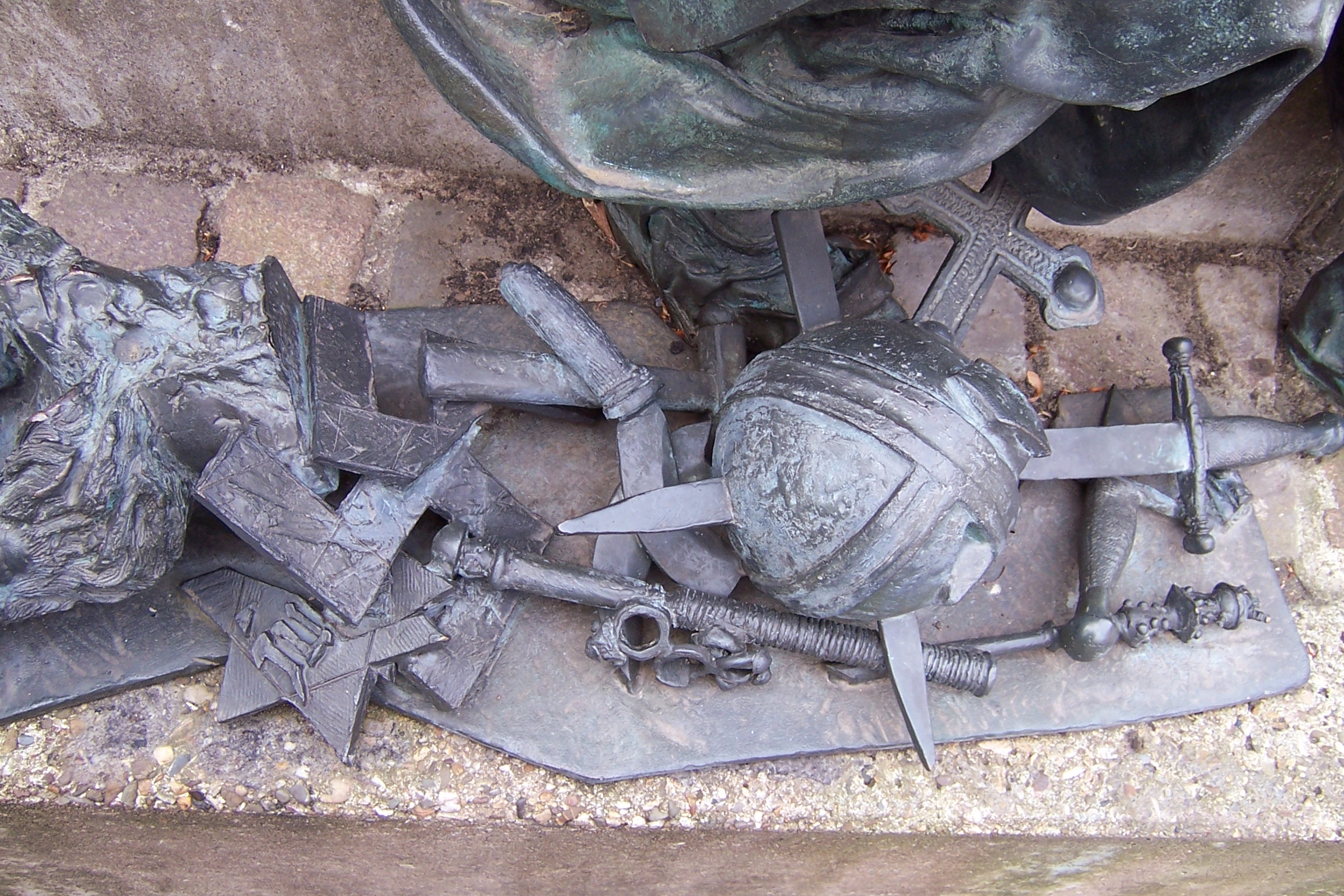
Detail: Broken signs and symbols

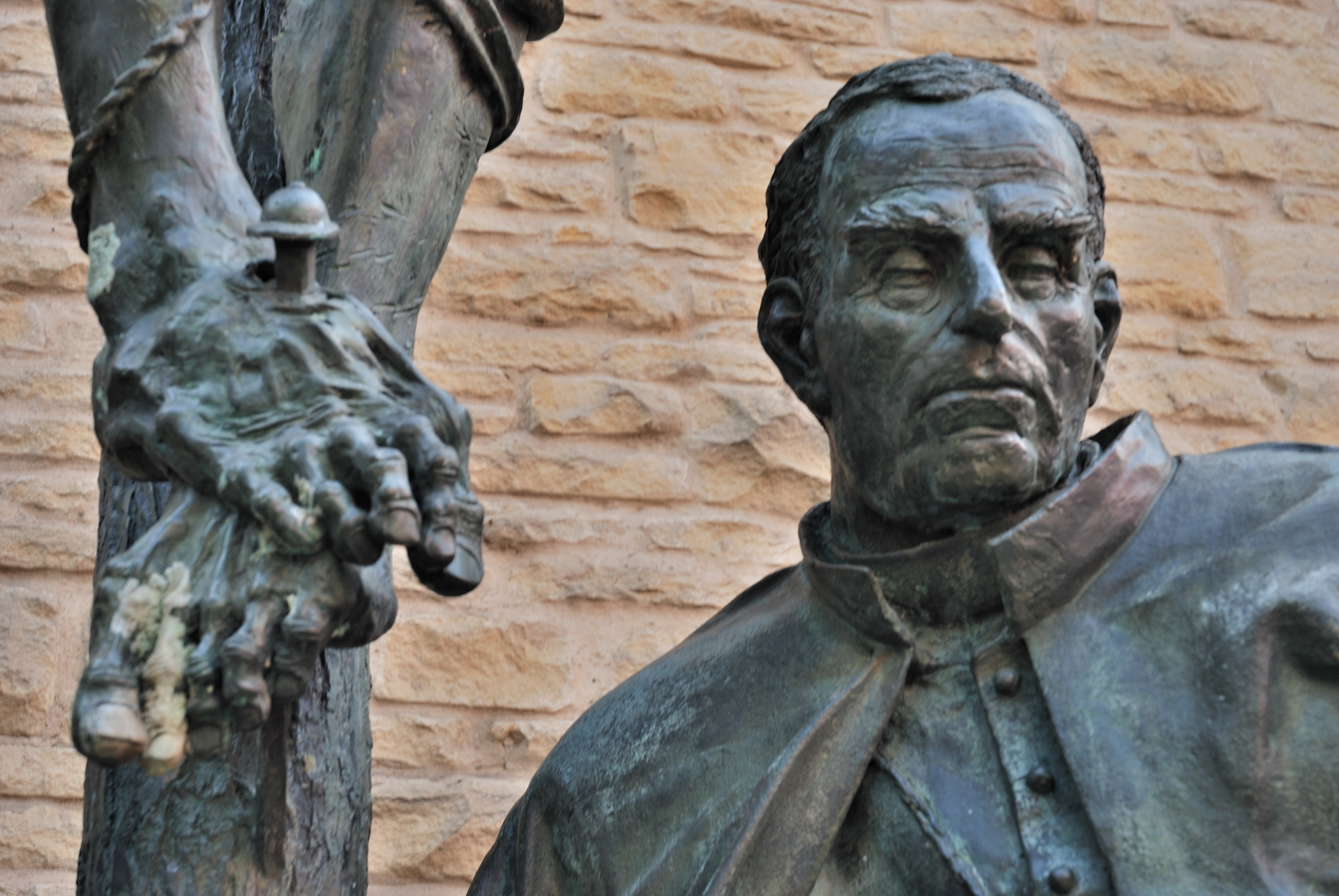
Cardinal von Galen

== Cathedral treasury ==
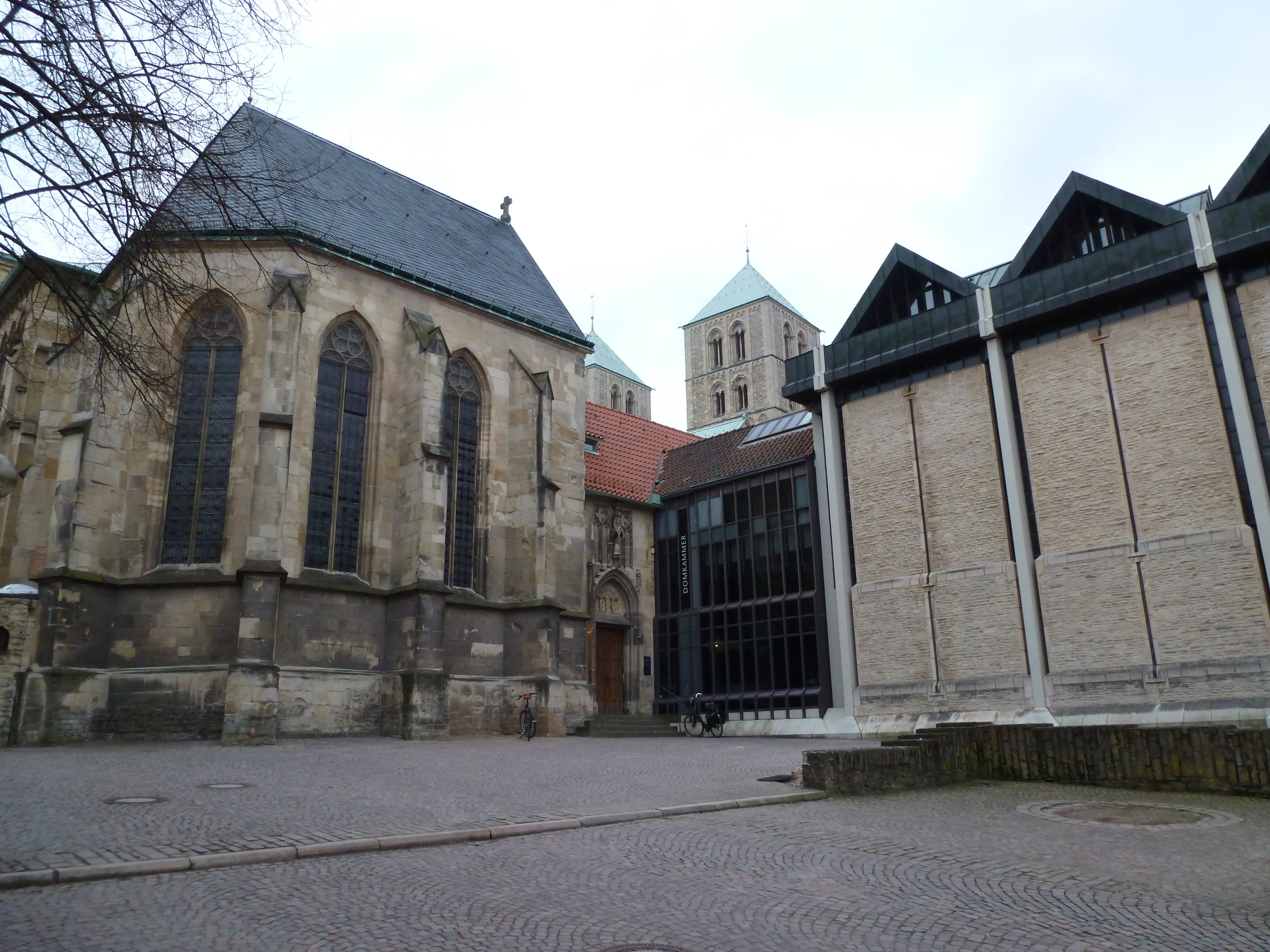
Diocesan museum at right, Marienkapelle at left

The Domschatz of Münster Cathedral, which has been stored since 1981 in a specially built treasury chamber north of the cloisters, contains valuable sacred artworks from the time of the Carolingians to the 20th century, particularly goldsmithery and textiles from the Romanesque, Gothic and Baroque periods. Some of the liturgical equipment in the treasury is still in use.

Over 700 items are on display in the treasury chamber, split over three floors.

The bottom floor is mostly historic parament and liturgical equipment: two chasubles from the 14th century, late Gothic costumes with Italian silk, velvet and gold brocade, and gold brocade chasubles donated by Maria Theresa (her son Maximilian Francis was Prince-Bishop of Münster from 1784 until 1801).

The middle level contains the most significant pieces in the cathedral treasury: former furnishings of the cathedral, like the so-called "speaking reliquaries", an image cycle by Hermann tom Ring, remains of Johann Brabender's rood screen and a series of monumental reliefs by Johann Mauritz Gröninger.

The upper level uses selected examples to offer a tour through the art historical period found in the cathedral.

The treasury is currently closed for renovation.

=== Speaking reliquaries ===
A highlight of the middle level are the "speaking reliquaries" which indicate the nature of the relic contained within them by their shape.

- The Pauluskopf (Bust of Paul), created c. 1040, is one of the oldest surviving reliquaries and the earliest reliquary bust in the western world to be made entirely of gold. It contains part of the skull cap of the Apostle Paul of Tarsus.
- Another bust of St Paul, in silver, is also found in the treasury. It came to Münster c. 1380. The face has a high hairline, straggly hair and divided beard – a style common in depictions of saints since Late Antiquity. On the bust's podium, which is decorated with gemstones, is a keystone with the Chi Rho.
- The Arm Reliquary of St Felicitas dates from around 1260 and was made in Münster. It contains the bones of St Felicitas' lower arm. The silver arm is richly decorated with strings of gemstones etc.
- The Bust of the Prophet Philo of Alexandria was made c. 1390. It is one of 14 reliquary busts associated with the Baroque high altar of the cathedral and among the greatest treasures in European collections. The face of the prophet is strikingly shaped. On his breast is a large crystal disc, with relics of St Walpurga and St Vincent behind it. Their names are written on the parchment strips which the prophet holds in his hands.

=== Further items ===
Other notable items include:

- A golden reliquary cross (c. 1090, Münster), an altar cross with a base made of Iranian quartz in the shape of a pawn; it is a crux gemmata and is richly decorated with semi-precious stones;
- The Kokosnußpokal (Coconut cup) from c. 1230;
- The 13th-century Dog Aquamanile, a golden Aquamanile or water jug in the shape of a dog, which was used by the priests to wash their hands during the liturgy; the dog, as a faithful guard to mankind, represented the watchfulness of the believers.
- The so-called Weibermachtreliquiar (Power of Women Reliquary), made of ivory in Münster c. 1370–1380 which depicts, among other things, Phyllis, the lover of the young Alexander the Great, riding the philosopher Aristotle.
- A sculpture of Christ scourged and wearing the crown of thorns, called the Elendschristus (Misery Christ) made of Bamburg sandstone c. 1470–1480.
- A fifteenth-century monstrance.
- The altarpiece of the old Johannesaltar, a painting by Kilian Wegeworth (Münster, 1537), depicting Christ holding the orb of the Earth, flanked by John the Baptist and John the Evangelist in an architectural setting.
- The so-called Horstmarer Pauluspokal (Horstmar Cup of Paul), made in 1651 by the goldsmith Johan Meiners of Coesfeld, which is a large double cup, crowned by a figure of Paul (the patron saint of the diocese), with map of all the places in the former Prince-Bishopric of Münster engraved on the sides. The cup can be opened in the middle and was probably used for the washing of hands and feet during the Easter liturgy.

== Organ and cathedral music ==
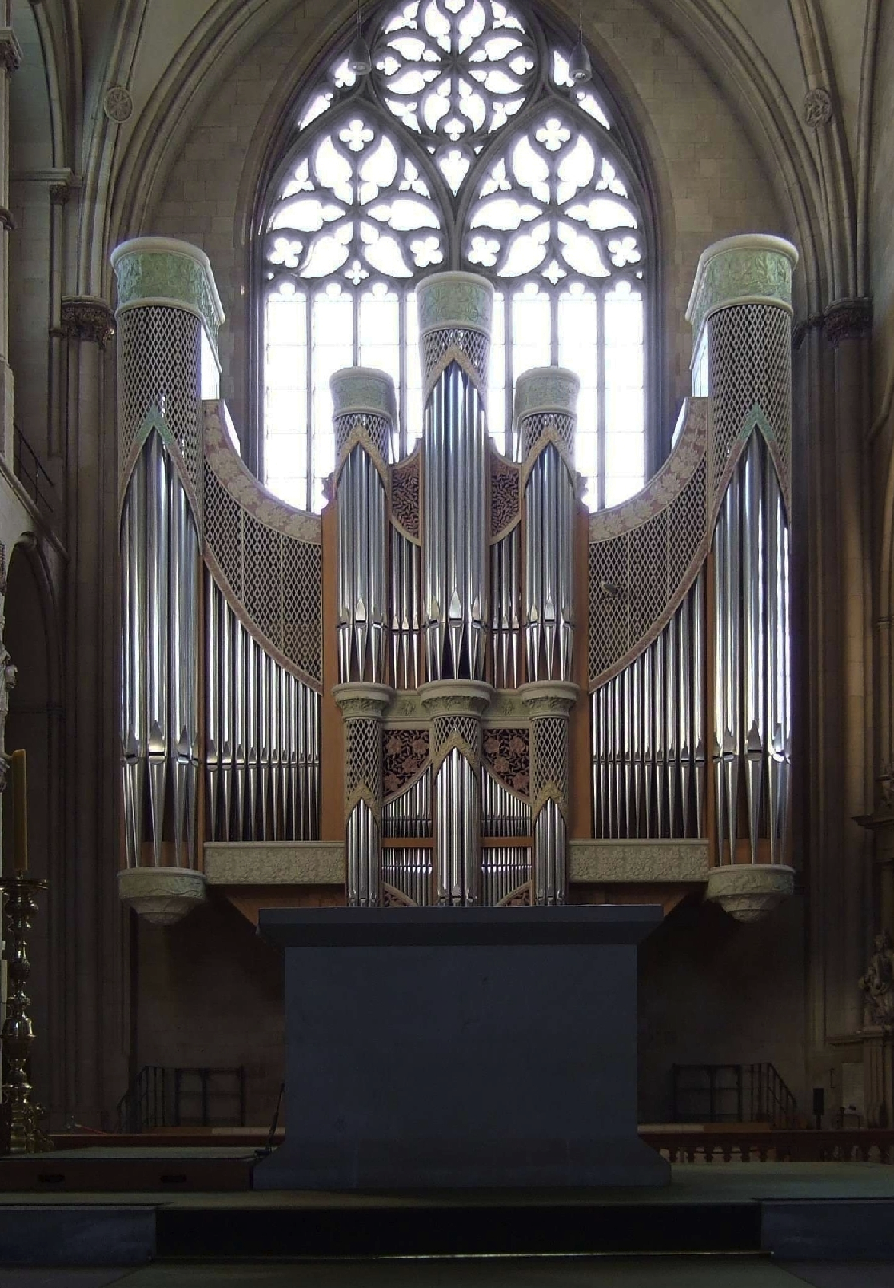
Cathedral organ in the east transept

The cathedral has three organs

- The main organ is in the east transept (Johannischoir). The pipeworks are largely those of the organ built by Hans Klais in 1956 and installed in a niche in the Stephanschoir (the north-east transept, K) opposite the chapter house. In 1987 the instrument was removed and re-installed in a new housing in front of the south window of the south-east transept, with a slightly different disposition. The disposition was slightly altered again in 2002.
- Since 2002, an auxiliary works has been located in the upper chapel of the north tower. It has 14 manual and pedal stops and serves to project sound into the western part of the cathedral. The auxiliary works have no console, instead they are operated from the main organ. These works are arranged similarly to a main works and contain an 8' high pressure stop "Tuba episcopalis," with extensions (16' and 4').
- In the west choir is the so-called "Lettner-Positiv". This is a small positive organ from the seventeenth century, which originally stood atop the rood screen (German: Lettner). It was completely restored and renovated in 2009. Today it is used to accompany sung Vespers.

Since 2003, the cathedral organist has been Thomas Schmitz. Among his predecessors as cathedral organist were cathedral vicar Dr Hans Ossing (1974–1997), who played a key role in the relocation of the organ in 1987, and Heinrich Stockhorst (1950–1973).

Several choirs are active in the cathedral: the cathedral choir of St Paul, the girls' choir, and the boys' choir – called the Capella Ludgeriana. Parts of the choirs also form the cathedral chamber choir and a choir for Gregorian chant. The cathedral choir and the Capella Ludgeriana have been led by cathedral choir master Alexander Lauer since August 2015. Verena Schürmann has been the women's choir master since 2006.

== Bells ==
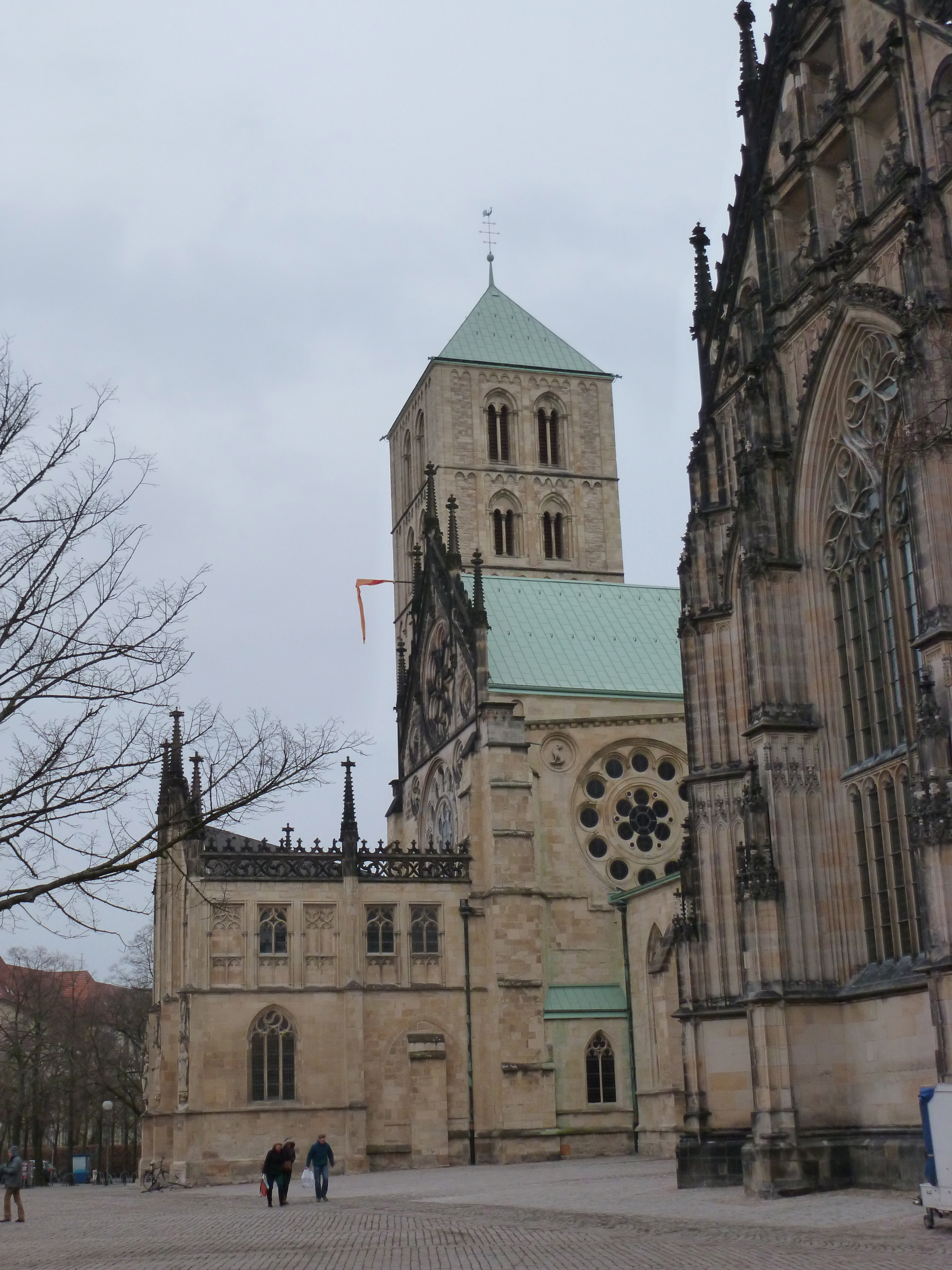
South tower; the bell frames take up the top two levels

At the beginning of the twentieth century, the south tower of the cathedral contained one of the largest rings of bells in Westphalia.

- The main ring consisted of six (large) bells, with strike tones g^{0}, a^{0}, c^{1}, d^{1}, f^{1} and g^{1}. Some of these were very old and precious bells – two of the resonators dated from the consecration of the cathedral in 1264; the others were cast in 1675, 1856, 1890 and 1911.
- Three small bells from 1538 and 1683 formed the crown ring. They had the tones h^{1}, d^{2} und fis^{2} and were called the "English" hunt, since they were "rung in rapid succession in a hunting melody."

In 1917, the Marybell from 1890 (d^{1}) was melted down for war purposes. In March 1945, the tower burnt down and all remaining bells were destroyed, including the two clock bells, one of which dated from the 14th century.

=== Ring in the south tower ===
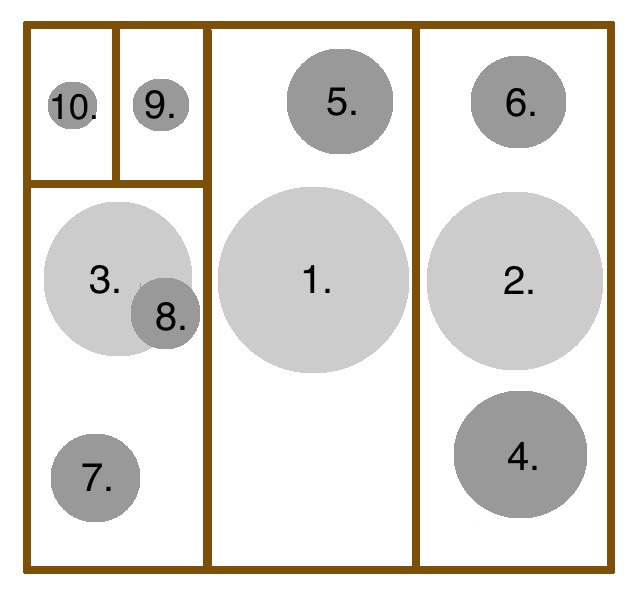
Arrangement of the cathedral bells (viewed from above. The bells on the lower tier are in light grey.)

Today 10 church bells hang in the south tower, the two largest bells are bourdon bells. One of them, the Ludgerus-bell, was cast in 1526 by Wolter Westerhues, a student of Gerhard von Wou, and originally hung in the parish church of St Ludgerus in Schermbeck. It was sold to the cathedral in 1954. The other nine bells were cast in 1956 by the Münster bellfoundry Feldmann & Marschel – their largest work.

During the manufacture of the nine bells in 1956 it came to be felt that the original ring should be expanded with a tenth, deeper bell (strike tone f^{0}). However, when the casting was complete, six of the bells were out of tune. Despite this set back, the bells were consecrated and installed on 29 September 1956. The affected bells were only fixed in 1979, after the employment of a bell expert. This tone correction affected the three largest bells, which were arranged into individual tones. At the same time, the state heritage office desired that the historic Ludgerus-bell be retuned; it had already been corrected in 1956 by Feldmann & Marschel.

Until 2011, the bells hung in a steel frame. In the course of the cathedral renovations of 2011–2012, this frame was replaced with a new oak wood frame, intended to produce a softer ring. The new frame consists of 24 m3 of wood and its load-redistributing substructure weighs 6 tonnes. In addition, the electrical system was renovated: the motor was replaced, and each bell was equipped with its own electronically operated strike hammer.

The bells are distributed over two levels in the frame, some at 34 m and some at 37 m above the ground: The three deepest bells hang on the lower level, under the rest of the bells. The new frame includes space in the centre of the upper level for an expansion of the ring, perhaps with a bell with strike tone dis^{1}. In Germany, the bells are always numbered from largest to smallest, Bell 1 is always the tenor or bourdon.

No.	Name	Year	Caster, location	Ø (mm)	Weight (kg)	Nominal (ST-^{1}/_{16}) [before tone correction]	Peal occasions (solo)
1	Kardinal (Bourdon Bell)	1956	Feldmann & Marschel, Münster	2267	7604	fis^{0} −7	Consecration (High Feast 1st rank), Death of priest/bishop
2	Bernardus (2nd Bourdon Bell)	1956	Feldmann & Marschel, Münster	1983	4490	gis^{0} −7	Consecration (High feast 2nd rank), Death of auxiliary bishop
3	Paulus	1956	Feldmann & Marschel, Münster	1675	2940	h^{0} −6	Consecration (Sunday), Death of cathedral capitular
4	Petrus	1956	Feldmann & Marschel, Münster	1469	2036	cis^{1} −7 [+2]	Death of a member of the community
5	Ludgerus	1526	Wolter Westerhues	1141	1000	e^{1} −5 [+4]	Weekday mass in Advent/Lent, Lenten sermon
6	Andreas	1956	Feldmann & Marschel, Münster	1074	790	fis^{1} −5 [+1]	Angelus at 7 am, noon & 6pm, Vespers in Advent/Lent
7	Maria	1956	Feldmann & Marschel, Münster	959	535	gis^{1} −4 [−1]	Vespers of the Poor Clares in Advent/Lent
8	Michael	1956	Feldmann & Marschel, Münster	835	363	h^{1} −3 [±0]	Bells 8–10 together as the "English Hunt": Eternal blessing prayer / forty hour prayer Benediction of the Blessed Sacrament
9	Gabriel	1956	Feldmann & Marschel, Münster	712	213	cis^{2} −3 [±0]	Bells 8–10 together as the "English Hunt": Eternal blessing prayer / forty hour prayer Benediction of the Blessed Sacrament
10	Raphael	1956	Feldmann & Marschel, Münster	578	120	e^{2} −2 [−1]	Bells 8–10 together as the "English Hunt": Eternal blessing prayer / forty hour prayer Benediction of the Blessed Sacrament

For the cathedral ring there is a distinct peal order for significant occasions (e.g. high feasts) and services (e.g. Pontifical High Mass) with a special number of bells or a special melody. There is a "pre-peal" with the smallest two bells for each peal on the occasion of every high mass. During the penitential seasons (Advent and Lent), the ring is reduced and at festivals it is increased or deepened. With the bells it is possible to ring out a special melody; these include the Westminster Quarters (descending: h^{0}, e^{1}, fis^{1}, gis^{1}) and the Salve Regina (ascending: e^{1}, gis^{1}, h^{1} cis^{2}).

=== Hour bells ===
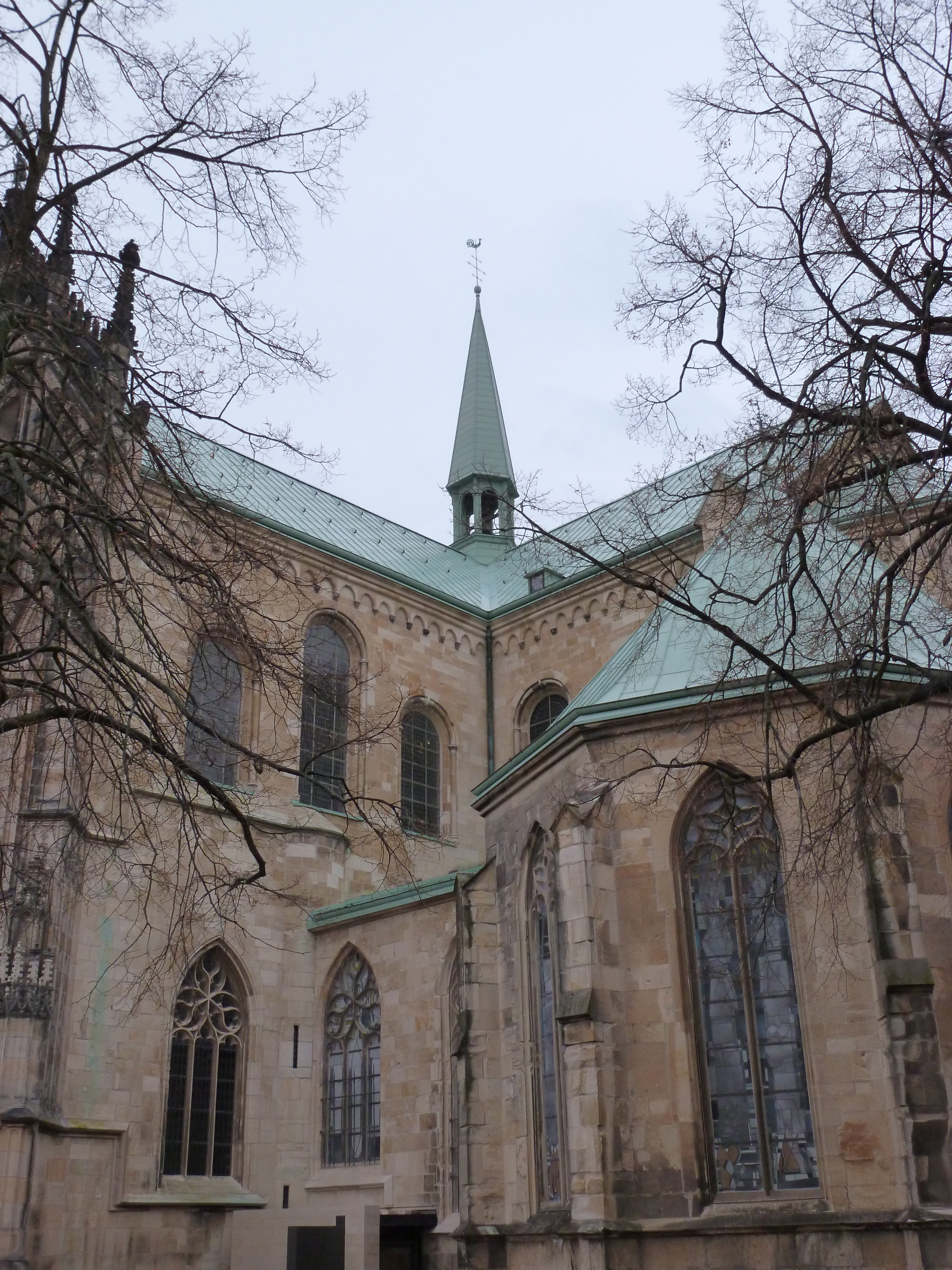
View of the flèche

In the flèche above the crossing are two bells from the Baroque period which were acquired after the war. They serve to ring the hours and quarter hours. The clock work is controlled by the astronomical clock.

No.	Name	Year	Caster, location	Ø (mm)	Weight (kg)	Nominal (ST-^{1}/_{16})	Function
I		1766	Christian August Becker, Hildesheim	600	150	g^{2} −1	Full hours
II		1772	unknown	470	60	a^{2} ±0	Quarter hours

== See also ==
- List of Gothic cathedrals in Europe

== Bibliography ==
General

- Domkapitel der Kathedralkirche zu Münster: Den Dom zu Münster virtuell erleben. 1200 Jahre Glaubensgeschichte in Bauwerken, in Kunstschätzen, in Gottesdiensten. DVD with 8 page handbook. Dialogverlag, Münster 2005, ISBN 3-937961-07-0.
- Simone Epking, Christoph Hellbrügge et al.: Der Dom zu Münster 793–1945–1993. Die Ausstattung. (= Denkmalpflege und Forschung in Westfalen. Band 26, 2). Mainz 2004, ISBN 3-8053-3416-8.
- Max Geisberg: Die Bau- und Kunstdenkmäler von Westfalen. Volume 41: Die Stadt Münster. Part 5: Der Dom. Münster 1977, ISBN 3-402-05094-3.
- Bernd Haunfelder, Edda Baußmann, Axel Schollmeier: „Ein wunderherrliches Werk“. Die Feierlichkeiten zum Wiederaufbau des Domes in Münster 1956. Aschendorff, Münster 2006, ISBN 3-402-00428-3.
- Géza Jászai, Rudolf Wakonigg: Der Dom zu Münster und seine Kunstschätze. Dialogverlag, Münster, ISBN 3-933144-28-0.
- Géza Jászai: Der Paulus-Dom zu Münster in alten Ansichten. Aschendorff Verlag, Münster 2001, ISBN 3-402-05425-6.
- Uwe Lobbedey: Der Dom zu Münster 793–1945–1993. Der Bau. (= Denkmalpflege und Forschung in Westfalen. Vol. 26, 1). Bonn 1993, ISBN 3-7749-2571-2.
- Alexandra Pesch: Der Dom zu Münster. Das Domkloster. Archäologie und historische Forschung zu Liudgers honestum monasterium in pago Sudergoe. Die Ausgrabungen 1936–1981 am Horsteberg in Münster. (= Denkmalpflege und Forschung in Westfalen. Band 26, 4). Mainz 2005, ISBN 3-8053-3515-6.
- Thomas Sternberg (Ed.): Der Paulus-Dom zu Münster. 2nd Edition. Franz-Hitze-Haus, Münster 1990, ISBN 3-9802204-1-9.
- Theodor Wieschebrink: Der St. Paulus-Dom zu Münster (Westf.). Domkapitel (Ed.), Münster 1965.
- Markus Trautmann, Christiane Daldrup: Unser Paulusdom in Münster. Domkapitel (Ed.). Michael Bönte (Photos). Dialogverlag, Münster 2013.

On the astronomical clock

- Theodor Wieschebrink: Die astronomische Uhr im Dom zu Münster. edited by Erich Hüttenhain. 2nd Edition. Aschendorff, Münster 1998, ISBN 3-402-05980-0.
- Trude Hüttenhain: Die astronomische Uhr im Dom zu Münster. 5th Edition. Aschendorff Verlag, Münster 2008, ISBN 978-3-402-05984-5.

On the Stations of the Cross

- Domkapitel der Kathedralkirche zu Münster: Weg der Hoffnung. Kreuzweg im St.-Paulus-Dom Münster. Dialogverlag, Münster, ISBN 3-933144-05-1.

On the Meistermann windows

- Werner Thissen: Einsichten in Unsichtbares. Die Fenster Georg Meistermanns im Dom zu Münster. 2nd Edition. Dialogverlag, Münster 1998, ISBN 3-933144-12-4.

Other topics

- Andreas Efing, Tobias Schrörs et al.: D.O.M.S. Lateinische Inschriften im Dom zu Münster: Übersetzt – Kommentiert – Gedeutet. 1st Edition. Dialogverlag Presse- und Medien Service, Münster 2009, ISBN 978-3-941462-00-7.
- Martin Goebel: Das Domgeläut zu Münster in Westfalen. CD with handbook. 2nd Edition. Münster 2000.
- Tobias Schrörs: Der Lettner im Dom zu Münster – Geschichte und liturgische Funktion. 1st Edition. Books on Demand, Norderstedt 2005, ISBN 3-8334-2658-6.
