= Domplatz (Münster) =

Square in Münster, Germany

Coordinates: 51°57′45″N 07°37′32″E

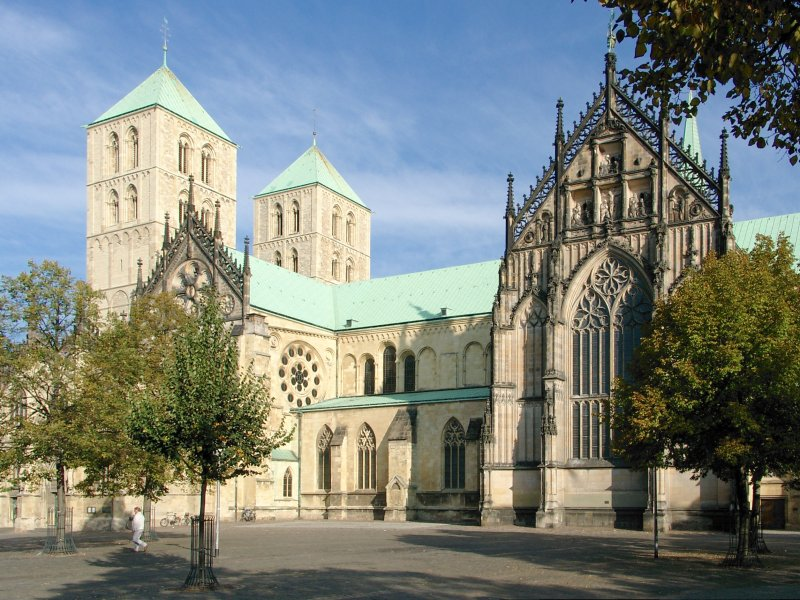
St.-Paulus-Dom in the Domplatz

The Domplatz (German: "Cathedral Square") in Münster, Westphalia, is the square in front of Münster Cathedral. The square lies to the south of the cathedral.

The traces of the 14th century Domburg are still recognisable in the modern Domplatz. The square was the centre of the Domimmunität. In the middle ages it contained the curia of the Domherren of the Münster Cathedral Chapter and St. Jacobi, the parish church for its servants. Immediately in front of the main door, the Michaelistor, stands the City hall, erected in the 14th century as an assertion of the townsmen against the bishop.

South of the Domplatz is the headquarters of the Münster Bezirksregierung, a branch of Deutsche Post, two cafes and the Westphalian State Museum of Art and Cultural History. On the west side the Domplatz is bordered by the Fürstenberghaus of the University of Münster and the Dishop's Balace, on the west side by the backs of the shops on Prinzipalmarkt and the buildings of the old Reichsbank branch, which now house offices of the Bezirksregierung.

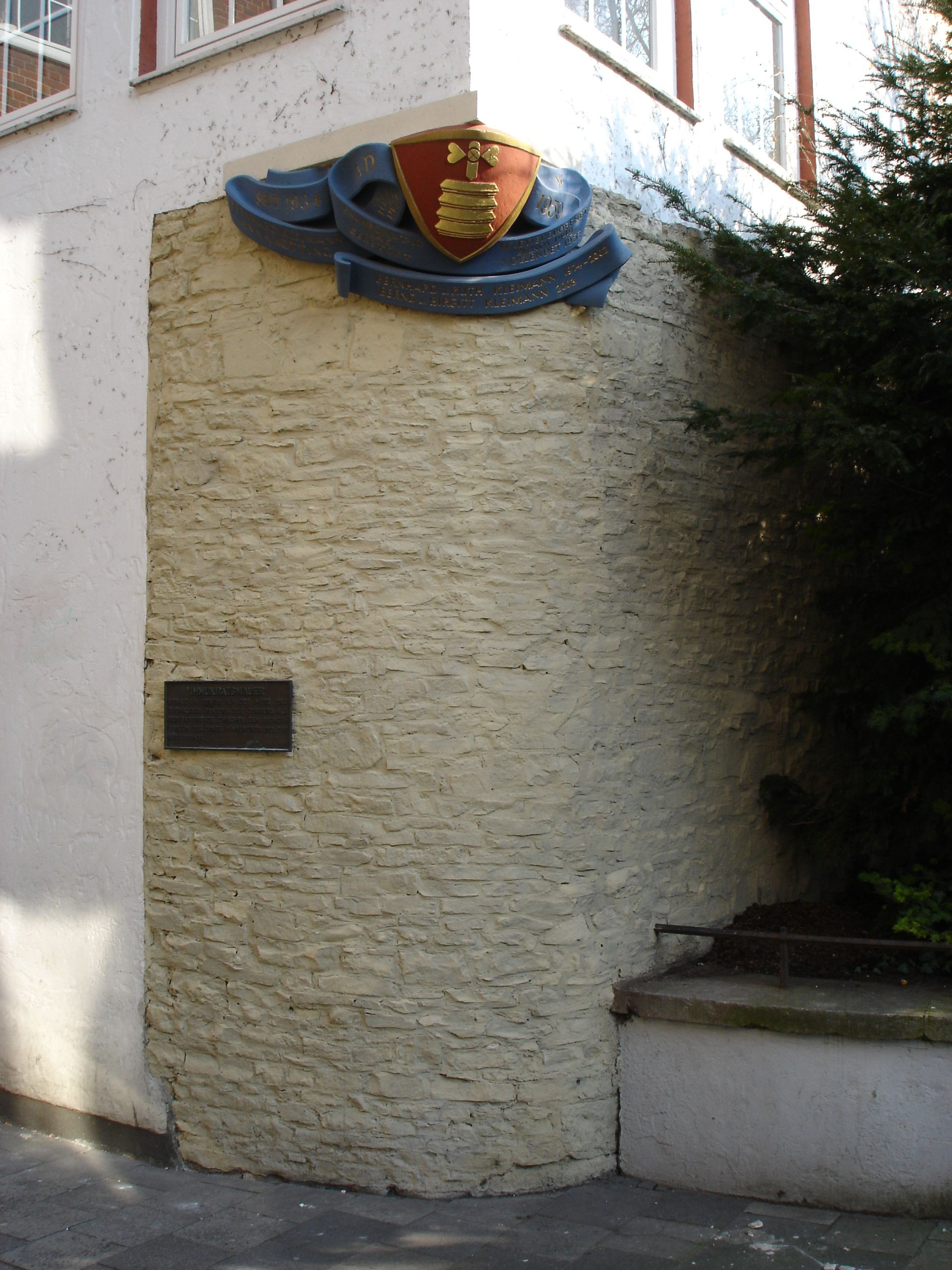
Last surviving piece of the Domplatz's Immunity-wall.

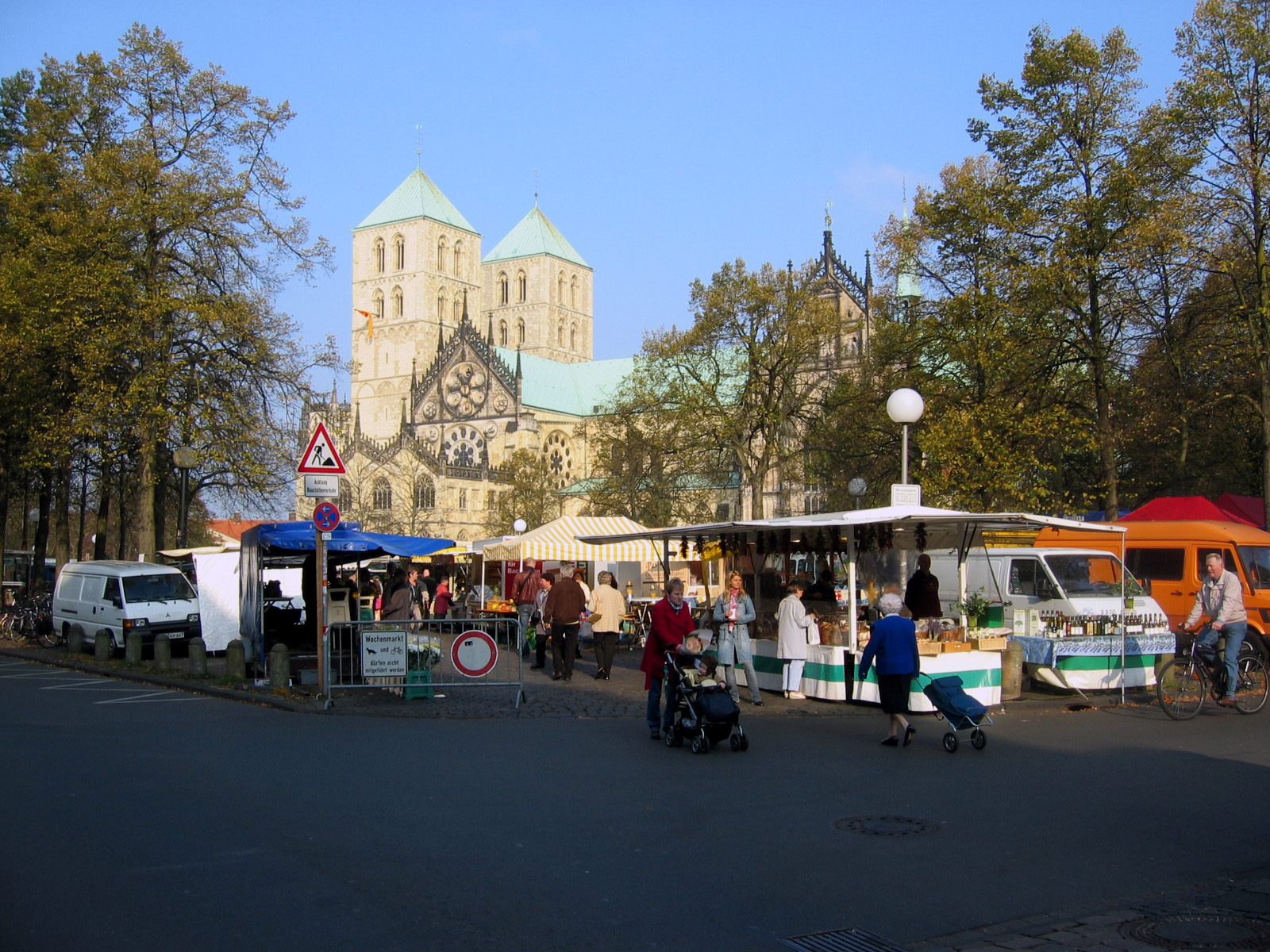
Weekly market in the Domplatz

On Wednesday and Saturday mornings there is a large market. On Fridays, biologically controlled and/or locally produced products are sold at a Biomarket. A portion of the east part of the square is a dedicated carpark, with about 100 positions, in order to alleviate the parking shortage in the Münster inner city area. The Domplatz is a key venue for open air events like the Eurocityfest. On the 1200th jubilee of the Diocese of Münster in Summer 2005, the band Silbermond sang in the Domplatz to an audience of 30,000.
