= Timeline of Münster =

The following is a timeline of the history of the city of Münster, North Rhine-Westphalia, Germany.

== Prior to 19th century ==
- 797 – School founded.
- 800 – Roman Catholic Diocese of Münster established.
- 800's – Charlemagne made it the residence of Saint Ludger, the newly appointed bishop of the Saxons.
- 1040 – Überwasserkirche convent founded.
- 1070 – Church of St Maurice founded.
- 1170 – Church of St Ludgerus erected.
- 1180
  - Prince-Bishopric of Münster established.
  - Municipal charter received.
- 13th C. – Member of the Hanseatic League.
- 1250 – Town Hall in use (approximate date).
- 1253 – Munster joins the City Alliance of Werne.
- 1264 - Münster Cathedral built.
- 1340 - Our Lady's Church built.
- 1444 - Kloster Niesing (béguinage) founded.
- 1450 – Münster Diocesan Feud begins.
- 1458 – Leinenlegge (cloth inspection entity) established (approximate date).
- 1485 – Printing press in operation.
- 1532 – Protestant Reformation.
- 1534 – February: Münster Rebellion; Anabaptists in power.
- 1588 – Jesuit College, Münster founded.
- 1589
  - Krameramtshaus (guild hall) built.
  - Jesuit College's Bibliotheca Paulina (library) active.
- 1617 – Saint Clare Monastery construction begins on the Stubengasse.
- 1630 – Liebfrauen-Schützenbruderschaft von 1630 Münster (militia) formed.
- 1648 – Dutch-Spanish peace treaty signed in Munster.
- 1661 – Forces of Christoph Bernhard von Galen occupy Munster.
- 1662 – Münster Citadel built.
- 1665 – An alliance with Christoph Bernhard von Galen was sought by the English against Holland.
- 1720 – Aschendorff publisher in business.
- 1759 - City besieged by Hanoverian forces during the Seven Years' War.
- 1780 - University of Münster founded.
- 1787 - Schloss Münster (palace) built.
- 1800 – Damenclub founded.

== 19th century ==
- 1803
  - Münster Regierungsbezirk (administrative region) established.
  - Botanischer Garten Münster established.
  - The bishopric was secularized and annexed to Prussia.
- 1806 – French in power.
- 1810 – Münster "annexed to France."
- 1815 – Münster "ceded to Prussia" per Congress of Vienna.
- 1816 – Population: 17,316.
- 1825 – Verein für Geschichte und Altertumskunde Westfalens, Abt. Münster (historical society) founded.
- 1829 – Staatsarchiv Münster (regional archive) established.
- 1835 - "Revidierte Städteordnung" (city self-administration) in effect.
- 1848
  - 25 May: Münster–Hamm railway begins operating.
  - Münster Hauptbahnhof opens.
- 1861 - Population: 27,332 (city).
- 1874 – Wanne-Eickel–Hamburg railway in operation.
- 1875
  - Lamberti, St. Mauritz, and Überwasser become part of city.
  - Münster Zoological Gardens established.
- 1880 - Population: 40,434.
- 1885 - Population: 44,060.
- 1890 – Münster Hauptbahnhof opened.
- 1892 – Westfälisches Museum für Naturkunde opens.
- 1895
  - Lortzing-Theater opens.
  - Population: 57,135.
- 1897 – Münstersche Zeitung (newspaper) in publication.
- 1899 – Port of Münster and Dortmund–Ems Canal open.

== 20th century ==
- 1901
  - Tram begins operating.
  - Stadtwerke Münster established.
- 1905 – Population: 81,468.
- 1906 – Stadtbücherei Münster (library) and SC Preußen Münster (football club) founded.
- 1908 – Westphalian State Museum opens.
- 1919
  - Münster Symphony Orchestra founded.
  - Population: 100,452.
- 1926 – Halle Münsterland and Preußenstadion (stadium) open.
- 1929 – Provinzialinstitut für westfälische Landes- und Volkskunde (regional history institute) founded.
- 1940
  - 16 May: Bombing of city by Allied forces begins.^{(de)}
  - Oflag VI-D prisoner-of-war camp mostly for French, but also some Polish and Soviet, officers founded.
  - Population: 144,945.
- 1944 - September: Allied prisoners of war relocated from Oflag VI-D to Oflag VI-A in Soest.
- 1946 - Westfälische Nachrichten newspaper begins publication.
- 1947 - Reconstruction of Prinzipalmarkt begins.
- 1948 - University of Münster's Institutum Judaicum Delitzschianum established.
- 1956 – Städtische Bühnen Münster (theatre) built.
- 1958 – Old City Hall reconstructed.
- 1960
  - City twinned with Orléans, France.
  - Population: 180,117.
- 1971 – Fachhochschule Münster established.
- 1972 – Münster/Osnabrück Airport begins operating.
- 1974 – Population: 200,448.
- 1975
  - Hiltrup becomes part of city.
  - Population: 264,546.
- 1977
  - Salzstraße (Münster) pedestrianized.
  - Skulptur Projekte Münster begins.
- 1979
  - Stadtmuseum Münster founded.
  - South Park, Münster created.
- 1981 – Filmfestival Münster begins.
- 1984 – Jörg Twenhöven becomes mayor.
- 1985 – Fernmeldeturm Münster (TV tower) erected.
- 1987 – Catholic pope visits city.
- 1993
  - Münster-Barometer survey begins.
  - Museum für Lackkunst opens.
- 1994 – Marion Tüns becomes mayor.
- 1999 – Berthold Tillmann becomes mayor.

== 21st century ==
- 2003 – Bait ul-Momin mosque opens in Hiltrup.
- 2005 – GuD-Kraftwerk Münster Hafen begins operating.
- 2007 – January: Storm.
- 2009 – Markus Lewe becomes mayor (CDU).
- 2010 – Population: 279,803.
- 2012 – British military stationed in York Barracks in Gremmendorf depart.
- 2018 – 2018 Münster attack.
- 2025 – Tilman Fuchs becomes mayor (Greens).

== See also ==
- History of Münster
- List of heritage sites in Münster (Westfalen)
- List of religious buildings in Münster
- Timelines of other cities in the state of North Rhine-Westphalia:^{(de)} Aachen, Bonn, Cologne, Dortmund, Duisburg, Düsseldorf, Essen

== Bibliography ==
=== in English ===
- Abraham Rees (1819), "Munster", The Cyclopaedia, London: Longman, Hurst, Rees, Orme & Brown, hdl:2027/mdp.39015011957639
- William Henry Overall, ed. (1870). "Munster, Prussia". Dictionary of Chronology. London: William Tegg. hdl:2027/uc2.ark:/13960/t9m32q949.
- "Münster" . Encyclopædia Britannica. Vol. 17 (9th ed.). 1884.
- "Münster". Handbook for North Germany. London: J. Murray. 1886. hdl:2027/hvd.hn1imr.
- "Münster". Chambers's Encyclopaedia. London: William and Robert Chambers Publishing. 1901.
- "Münster", Northern Germany (15th ed.), Leipzig: Karl Baedeker, 1910, OCLC 78390379
- "Münster (Westphalia)" . Encyclopædia Britannica. Vol. 19 (11th ed.). 1910.
- Benjamin Vincent (1910), "Münster", Haydn's Dictionary of Dates (25th ed.), London: Ward, Lock & Co., hdl:2027/uc2.ark:/13960/t41r6xh8t
- Joseph Lins (1911). "Diocese of Münster". Catholic Encyclopedia. New York: Robert Appleton Company – via Google Books.
- R. Po-chia Hsia (1984). Society and Religion in Münster, 1535–1618. Yale University Press. ISBN 978-0-300-03005-1.
- D. Jonathan Grieser (1995). "Tale of Two Convents: Nuns and Anabaptists in Munster, 1533-1535". Sixteenth Century Journal. 26 (1): 31–47. doi:10.2307/2541524. JSTOR 2541524.
- John M. Jeep, ed. (2001). "Munster". Medieval Germany: an Encyclopedia. Garland Publishing. ISBN 0-8240-7644-3.
- Colum Hourihane, ed. (2012). "Munster". Grove Encyclopedia of Medieval Art and Architecture. Oxford University Press. ISBN 978-0-19-539536-5.

=== in German ===
- Topographisch-historisch-statistische Beschreibung der Stadt Münster (in German), 1836
- Heinrich August Erhard (1837), Geschichte Münsters (in German), Fr. Regensberg
- J. F. Lange (1855). Münster und seine nächsten Umgebungen (in German) (2nd ed.). Munster: Friedrich Regensberg.
- "Munster: Die Stadt". Biblioteca geographica: Verzeichniss der seit der Mitte des vorigen Jahrhunderts bis zu Ende des Jahres 1856 in Deutschland (in German). Leipzig: Wilhelm Engelmann. 1858. (bibliography)
- Hermann Lövinson (1889). "Münster". Beiträge zur Verfassungsgeschichte der Westfälischen Reichsstiftsstädte (in German). Paderborn: Verlag Ferdinand Schöningh.
- Karl von Hegel (1891). "Munster". Städte und Gilden der germanischen Völker im Mittelalter (in German). Vol. 2. Leipzig: Duncker & Humblot. hdl:2027/wu.89094689700 – via HathiTrust.
- "Münster". Brockhaus' Konversations-Lexikon (in German) (14th ed.). Leipzig: Brockhaus. 1896. hdl:2027/njp.32101064064494.
- Quellen und Forschungen zur Geschichte der Stadt Münster [Sources and research on the history of the city of Münster] (in German), vol. 1, 1898
- P. Krauss und E. Uetrecht, ed. (1913). "Munster". Meyers Deutscher Städteatlas [Meyer's Atlas of German Cities] (in German). Leipzig: Bibliographisches Institut.
- Albert Ludorff, ed. (1932). Stadt Münster. Die Bau- und Kunstdenkmäler von Westfalen (in German). Vol. 41.
- Franz-Josef Jakobi, ed. (1993), Geschichte der Stadt Münster (in German), Münster Stadtarchiv
- Karl-Heinz Kirchhoff; Mechthild Siekmann, eds. (1993), Munster, Westfälischer Städteatlas (in German), vol. 4
- Susanne Kill (2001). Das Bürgertum in Münster 1770–1870: Bürgerliche Selbstbestimmung im Spannungsfeld von Kirche und Staat [The middle classes in Münster 1770–1870: Civil self-determination in the tension between church and state] (in German). Munich: R. Oldenbourg Verlag. ISBN 978-3-486-83264-8.
- Wolfgang Adam; Siegrid Westphal, eds. (2012). "Munster". Handbuch kultureller Zentren der Frühen Neuzeit: Städte und Residenzen im alten deutschen Sprachraum (in German). De Gruyter. pp. 1519+. ISBN 978-3-11-029555-9.
