= Randeck =

Randeck may refer to:

== People ==
- House of Randeck, a German family whose seat was at Randeck Castle
- Eberhard of Randeck (died 1372), cathedral dean and bishop-elect of Speyer; see Randeck Castle
- Marquard of Randeck (1296–1381), Patriarch of Aquileia
- Marquard of Randegg (also: Randeck; died 1406), a bishop of Minden

== Other uses ==
- Randeck Castle (Palatinate), ruined castle in Donnersbergkreis, Rhineland-Palatinate, Germany
- Randeck Maar Formation, Southwestern Germany
- Randeck Museum, Mannweiler-Cölln, Rhineland-Palatinate, Germany
