= St. Jacobi, Münster =

Coordinates: 51°57′44″N 7°37′34″E

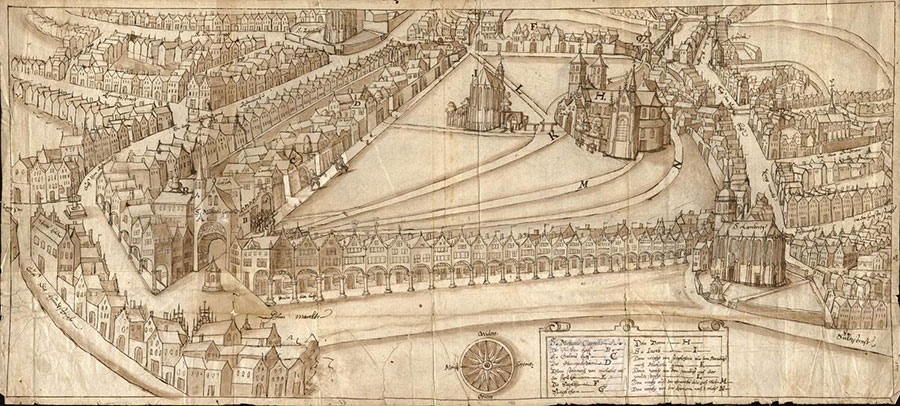
Munster c.1600 (view from the east); St. Jacobi is in the Domplatz at left (south), next to the Cathedral

The church St. Jacobi was located south of Münster Cathedral in the Domplatz in Münster and served as the parish church for the laity who lived within the Domimmunität. The church is first mentioned in 1262. The building was heavily damaged during the Münster Rebellion, but was rebuilt after 1535. During the French period, the building was demolished in 1812 after the rejection of an alternative proposal to demolish the cathedral and expand St. Jacobi. The bells of St. Jacobi continue in use at St. Agatha in Angelmodde.

According to a 1748 ground plan of the cathedral and cathedral district including St Jacobi by Schlauns, St. Jacobi was an aisleless church, had three-bayed structure enclosed by cross-vaults with a polygonal apse (5/8 choir: five segments of an octagon). On the south side of the church building was a fenced area whose purpose (graveyard?) is no longer clear.

== Bibliography ==
- Wilhelm Kohl: Das Domstift St. Paulus zu Münster. Berlin 1987 (Germania sacra NF 17,1), pp. 52–54.
