= Nikolaus Georg von Reigersberg =

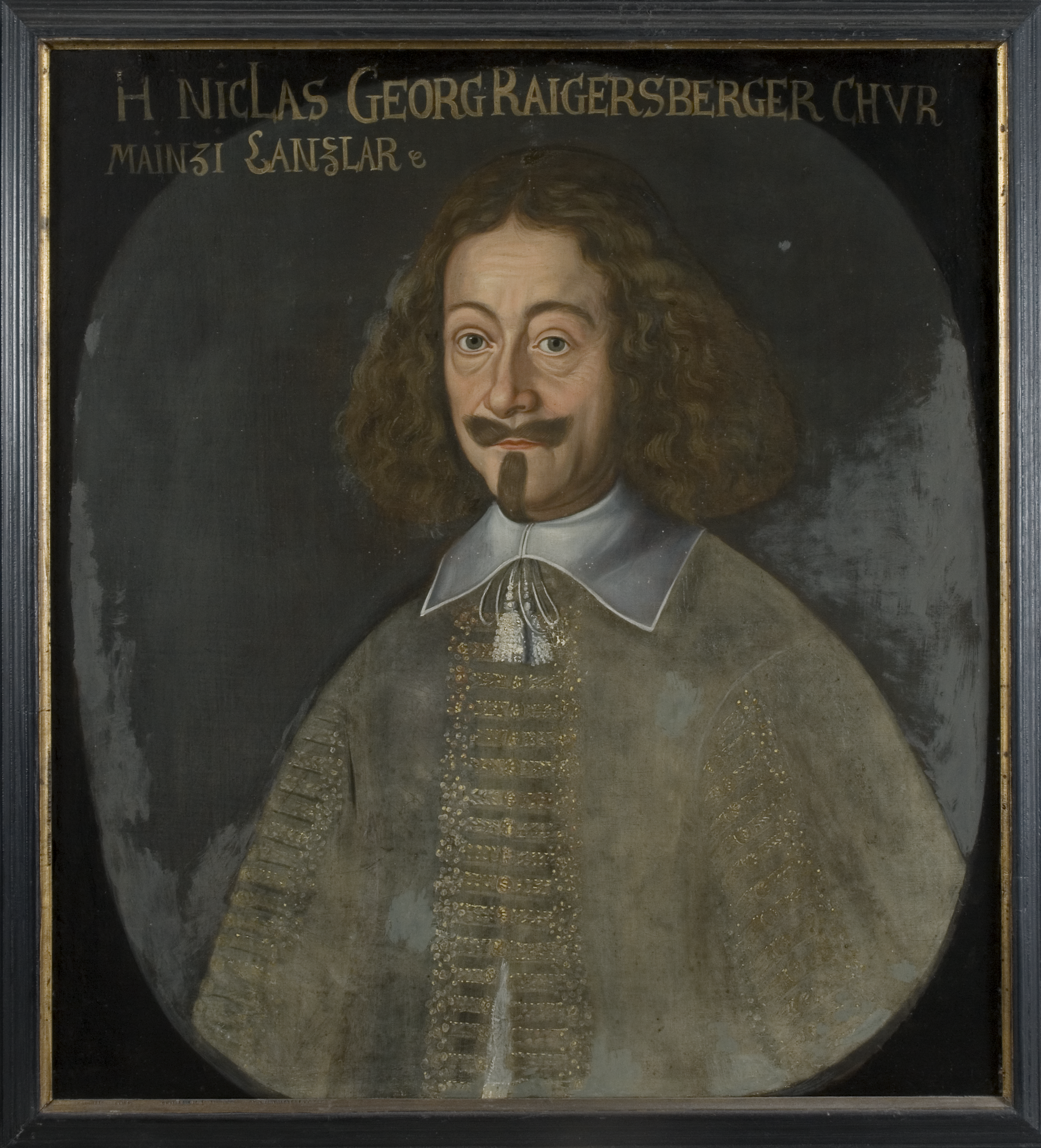

Nikolaus Georg von Reigersberg (1598 – 7 June 1651) was an imperial official, Chancellor in the Electorate of Mainz and Mayor of Aschaffenburg. He came to wider prominence as a delegate from Mainz to the negotiations at Münster that eventually ended the Thirty Years' War.

== Life ==
=== Provenance, early years and family ===
Born in 1598, Nikolaus Georg von Reigersberg was the son of a butcher, also called Georg von Reigersberg, in Diedenhofen and his wife Anna Gudnacht. The younger Georg von Reigersberg studied Jurisprudence at Cologne and Mainz, concluding his studies with a double doctorate in canon and civil law. His first marriage, which took place on 24 August 1624, was to Maria Salome von Faber, the daughter of the cup-bearer Nikolaus Faber. She died in 1639, by which point the marriage had produced four recorded sons and one daughter. His second marriage was to the heiress Eva Maria von Münster, who brought the Collenburg into the family. The Collenburg (hill), and a century later the Schloss Fechenbach, would become the family seat for their heirs.

=== Career ===
His professional career began in 1622 with a court appointment as secretary in the electoral chancelry of Mainz. From 1624 till 1651 he also served as Schultheiß in Aschaffenburg. He also presided as inquisitor in witch trials at Aschaffenburg, Großkrotzenburg, Wörth und Mönchberg. However, he was relieved of his inquisitorial responsibilities in 1628 following allegations that he was using the office to enrich himself. In 1635 Elector-Archbishop Anselm Casimir Wambold von Umstadt appointed him to the nobility. Between 1640 and 1643 he was a member of the Elector-Archbishop's privy council, and Chancellor of the Archbishopric of Mainz.

The size of von Reigersberg's footprint on history results not merely from a succession of court appointments and meetings with princes, but also from his participation in the peace negotiations at Münster and Osnabrück in March 1648 which led to the Peace of Westphalia and the end of thirty years of exceptionally destructive warfare. As the representative of Johann Philipp von Schönborn, who had taken over as Elector-Archbishop of Mainz in 1647, on 24 October 1648 von Reigersberg placed his signature on the treaty document. His was the first of the signatures placed by or on behalf of the Prince-electors. His contribution was prominently acknowledged by Emperor Ferdinand.

In 1651, his politics being no longer in tune with the times, he requested to be released from his chancellorship. He died in 1652 and was buried in The Church of Our Lady in Aaschafenburg.
