= Roger Wilmans =

German historian and archivist

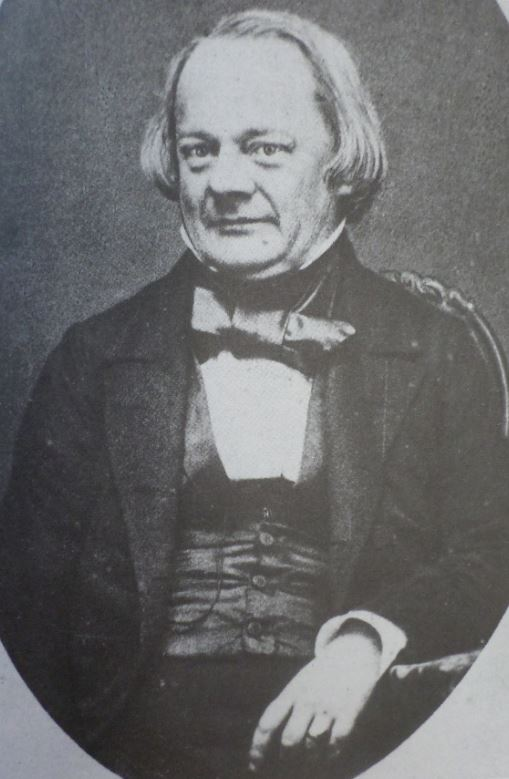
Roger Wilmans in 1868

Franz Friedrich Roger Wilmans (18 July 1812, in Bielefeld – 28 January 1881, in Münster) was a German historian and archivist.

From 1832 he studied philology and history at the University of Berlin, receiving his doctorate in 1835 with a dissertation on Cassius Dio, De Dionis Cassii fontibus et auctoritate. Afterwards, he worked as a schoolteacher at the Cadet Corps and Joachimsthal Gymnasium in Berlin. In 1851 he succeeded Heinrich August Erhard as director of the provincial archives in Münster, a position he maintained up until his death in 1881.

== Selected works ==
He made important contributions to the Monumenta Germaniae Historica, that included editions of works by Otto von Freising. Among his other principal writings are the following:

- Jahrbücher des Deutschen Reichs unter der Herrschaft König und Kaiser Otto's III., 983-1002, (1840) – Yearbooks on the German Empire under the rule of King and Emperor Otto III, 983–1002.
- Die Kaiserurkunden der Provinz Westfalen 777–1313 – The royal register of the province of Westphalia 777–1313.
  - Die Urkunden des Karolingischen Zeitalters 777–900, (1867) – Documents of the Carolingian era 777–900.
  - Die Urkunden der Jahre 901–1254, (1881) – Records of the years 901–1254.
- Die Schicksale der Reichskleinodien und des Kirchenschatzes des Aachener Krönungsstiftes während der französischen Revolution, (1872) – Fates of the imperial ministries and church treasuries of the Aachen Krönungsstift during the French Revolution.
- Zur Geschichte der Universität Münster in den Jahren 1802–1818. Nach archivalischen Quellen, (1875) – History of the University of Münster in the years 1802–1818; according to archival sources.

In the Westfälisches Urkundenbuch (Westphalian register) he published:

- Index zu H. A. Erhardts Regesta historiae Westfaliae, (1861) – Index to Erhardt's Regesta historiae Westfaliae.
- Die Urkunden des Bisthums Münster von 1201–1300, (1871) – Records of the Bishopric of Münster from 1201 to 1300.
- Die Urkunden des Bistums Paderborn 1201–1300 – Documents of the Diocese of Paderborn 1201–1300.
  - Book 1: Die Urkunden der Jahre 1201–1240, (1871) – Records from the years 1201–1240.
  - Book 2: Die Urkunden der Jahre 1241–1250, (1880) – Records from the years 1241–1250.
