= Randeck Castle (Palatinate) =

- Burg Randeck; Burg Randegg
- Mannweiler-Cölln
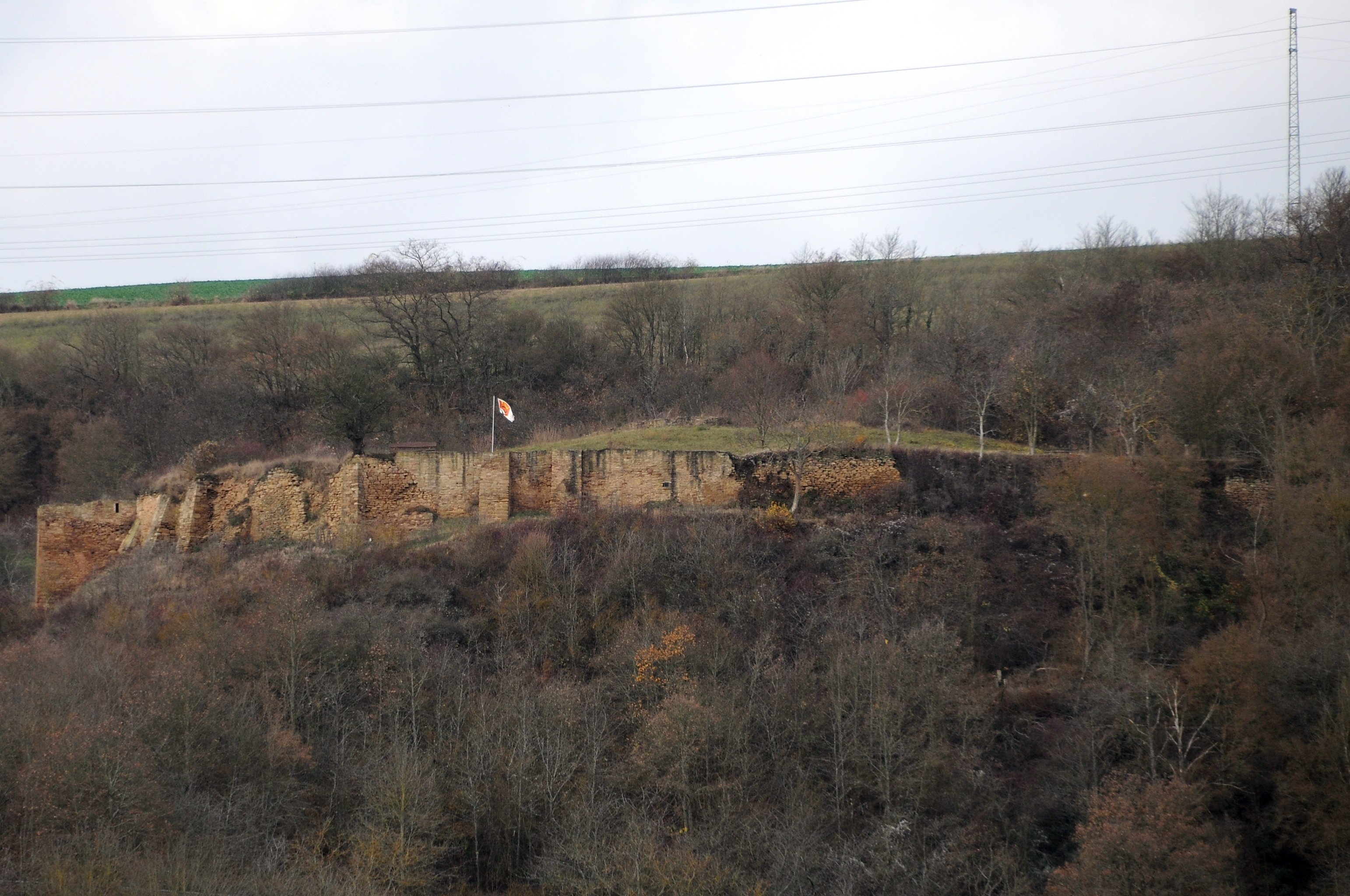
- Randeck Castle seen from Mannweiler

Site information
- Type: hill castle
- Code: DE-RP
- Condition: wall remains

Location
- Coordinates: 49°41′48″N 7°47′37″E
- Height: 263 m above sea level (NHN)

Site history
- Built: c. 1200

Garrison information
- Occupants: nobility

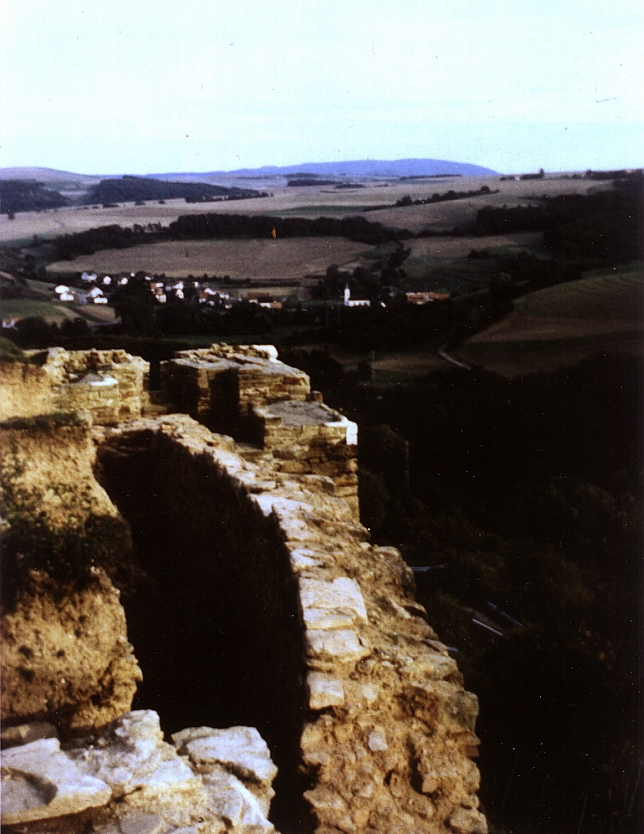
View from Randeck Castle looking towards the Donnersberg, 1986

Randeck Castle (German: Burg Randeck or Randegg) is a ruined hill castle on the Schlossberg (263 m above sea level (NHN)) roughly west of the wine growing village of Mannweiler-Cölln on the River Alsenz in the county of Donnersbergkreis in the German state of Rhineland-Palatinate. It was the family seat of the lords of Randeck.

== History ==
The castle was probably built in the 12th century. It is first recorded in 1202 with a Henry of Randeck (Henricus de Randeke). He was probably a grandson of Ulrich of Wartenberg. He was succeeded in 1231 by his son Godfrey I of Randeck. The grandson of Godfrey in 1298, Dietrich of Randeck. Another grandson in 1311, George of Randeck. From here were also descended Eberhard of Randeck (d 1372), cathedral dean and Bishop-elect of Speyer.

The castle was loaned in 1649 by Emperor Ferdinand III to the Teutonic knight, Hans Ludwig of Lewenstein. After the Lewensteins died out, the castle fell in 1668 to the Electoral Mainz chancellor, Nikolaus Georg Reigersberg. In 1690, during the War of the Palatine Succession, the castle was suddenly stormed by the French and blown up. Despite that, a few of its buildings were made habitable again. It was reported in 1844 that the castle was in private hands; it was torn down and its materials utilised.

Today, the castle is owned by the Cultural History Society of Mannweiler-Cölln. The remains of the enceinte, a corner outwork, the flanking towers and the foundations of the bergfried have survived.
