= Mannweiler-Cölln =

- Municipality
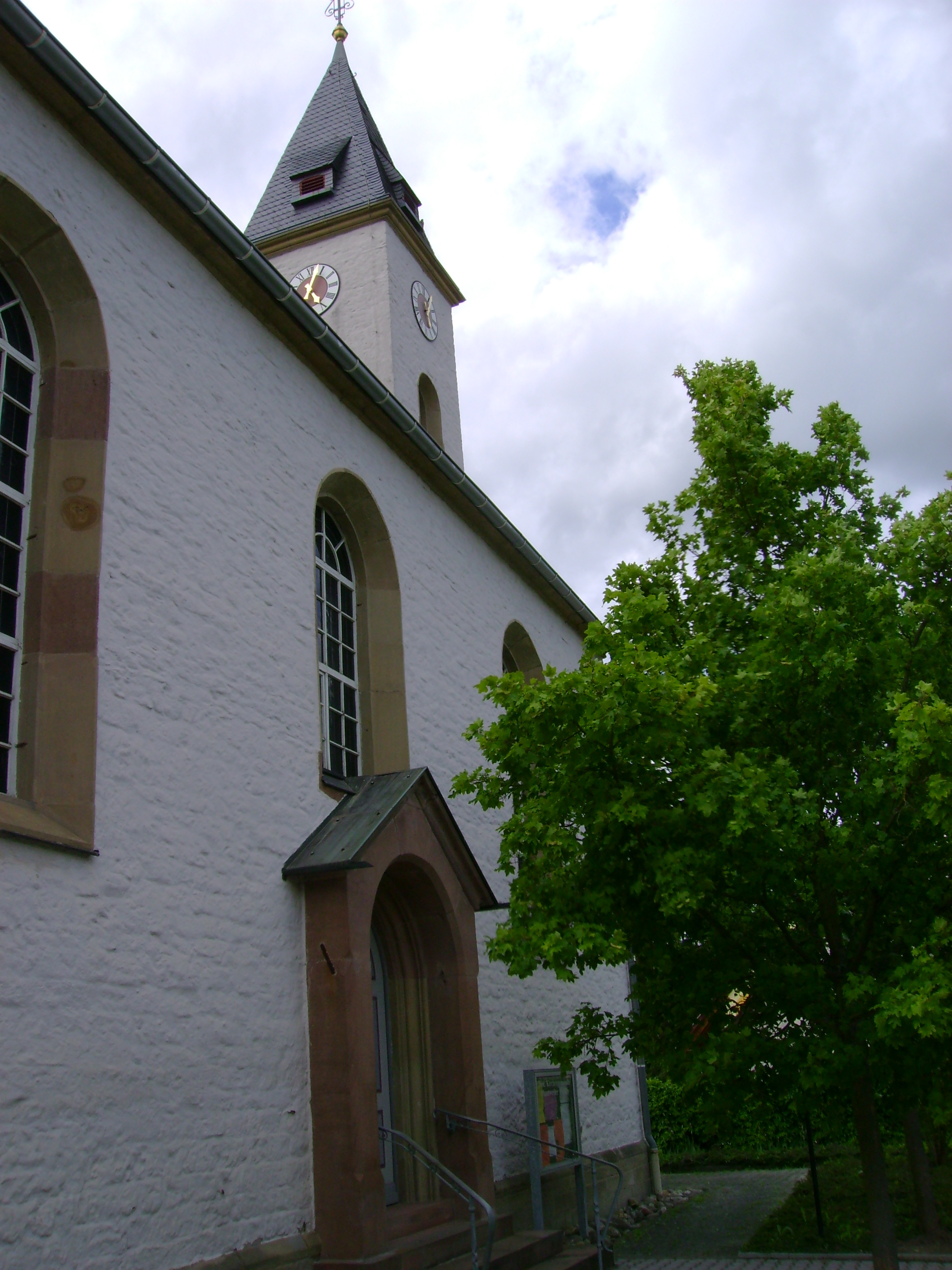
- protestant church

- Coat of arms

- Location of Mannweiler-Cölln within Donnersbergkreis district
- Interactive map of Mannweiler-Cölln
- Location within Germany Location within Rhineland-Palatinate
- Coordinates: 49°41′35″N 7°48′14″E
- Country: Germany
- State: Rhineland-Palatinate
- District: Donnersbergkreis
- Municipal assoc.: Nordpfälzer Land

Government
  - Mayor (2019–24): Udo Weyh

Area
  - Total: 4.90 km^{2} (1.89 sq mi)
- Elevation: 165 m (541 ft)

Population (2025-12-31)
  - Total: 382
  - Density: 78.0/km^{2} (202/sq mi)
- Time zone: UTC+01:00 (CET)
  - Summer (DST): UTC+02:00 (CEST)
- Postal codes: 67822
- Dialling codes: 06362
- Vehicle registration: KIB

Mannweiler-Cölln is a municipality in the Donnersbergkreis district, in Rhineland-Palatinate, Germany.

== Geography ==
Mannweiler-Cölln is located in the Alsenz river valley in the North Palatine Uplands. It borders Oberndorf, Bayerfeld-Steckweiler and Schiersfeld.

Kaiserslautern is located about 38 km (24 mi) to the south.

== History ==
The current municipality was formed in 1969 by the merger of Mannweiler (north) and Cölln (south).

== Culture and sights ==
- The Protestant Church of Mannweiler-Cölln (built 1860–61)
- Catholic Chapel (Kleiner Böhl 2). Chapel room in old Catholic schoolhouse, made 1741 by conversion of a farmhouse. Timber-framed building with stained-glass, today occasionally used for services
- Randeck Museum (Böhlstraße 5).
- Ruins of Randeck Castle
- Ruins of the Stolzenburg (in the vicinity)

== Infrastructure ==
Mannweiler had an epounymous station along the Alsenz Valley Railway. Cölln shared a station with neighbouring Bayerfeld-Steckweiler under the name Bayerfeld-Cölln. Both were closed after World War II.
