= History of Münster =

History of the city in Germany (793-)

Münster is a city in the northern part of North Rhine-Westphalia, Germany. Münster is a major university town and was the location of several significant historical events.

== Founding ==
In 793, Charlemagne sent out as missionary the Frisian Liudger (later canonized) to convert the Saxons with whom he had been battling, offering as headquarters his recently demolished Frankish stronghold of Mimigernaford ("ford over the Aa river"), at the crossroads of the road from Cologne and the road to Frisia. Liudger was a product of Utrecht and the York school of Ethelbert, which produced many of the clerics who served in Charlemagne's chancelry. He built his church and cloister on the right bank, on the height called the Horsteberg: it was the monastery ("monasterium") from which Münster derives its name. In 805, Liudger travelled to Rome to be ordained as the first bishop of Münster, and soon founded a school (The Gymnasium Paulinum is believed to have been founded as the monastery school in 797). The combination of ford and crossroad, marketplace, episcopal administration center, library, and school, established Münster as an important center .

== Middle ages ==
In the Middle Ages, Münster was a leading member of the Hanseatic League. By the beginning of the Sixteenth Century Münster had a population of over 15,000 and had achieved a considerable degree of self-government under its territorial leader, the Bishop of Münster.

== Early Modern period ==
=== Anabaptists and New Jerusalem ===
In August 1532, radical Protestants under the leadership of the former Lutheran priest Bernt Rothmann and the cloth merchant and magistrate Bernhard Knipperdolling took control of all of Münster's churches, with the exception of the Bishop's cathedral. By late 1533, these radicals had effective control of the entire town. By this time, they had also been converted to the Anabaptist ideas of Melchior Hoffman.

In 1534 these Anabaptists, led by Jan Matthys (or Matthijs) and Jan Beukels (often referred to as John of Leiden), took power openly in the Münster Rebellion and founded a "New Jerusalem." They claimed all property, burned all books except the Bible, and expelled or executed dissenters. John of Leiden believed he would lead the elect from Münster to capture the entire world and purify it of evil with the sword in preparation of Jesus's Second Coming and the beginnings of a New Age.

However, after a lengthy siege, with associated high mortality due to famine and disease, the town fell to Bishop Franz von Waldeck and his Imperial allies on July 24, 1535. The remaining Anabaptists were slaughtered, their corpses were exhibited in cages, which can still be seen hanging on the Tower of St. Lamberti's steeple.

=== Peace of Westphalia ===
The signing of the Peace of Westphalia of 1648 at Münster and Osnabrück ended the Thirty Years' War and Eighty Years' War and was one of the foundations upon which modern Europe was built. It also guaranteed the future of the prince-bishop and the diocese; the area was to be exclusively Roman Catholic.

=== Modern Münster ===
In 1780 the University of Münster (official name: German "Westfälische Wilhelms-Universität") was established, now a major European centre for excellence in education and research with large faculties in the arts, humanities, theology, sciences, business and law. Currently there are about 40,000 undergraduate and postgraduate students enrolled. In 1802 Münster was conquered by Prussia during the Napoleonic Wars. It became the capital of the Prussian province of Westphalia. A century later in 1899 the city's harbour started operations when the city was linked to the Dortmund-Ems Canal. With the spread of radio technology, in 1924 the radio and television organisation Westdeutscher Rundfunk (WDR) was set up in Münster's harbour area.

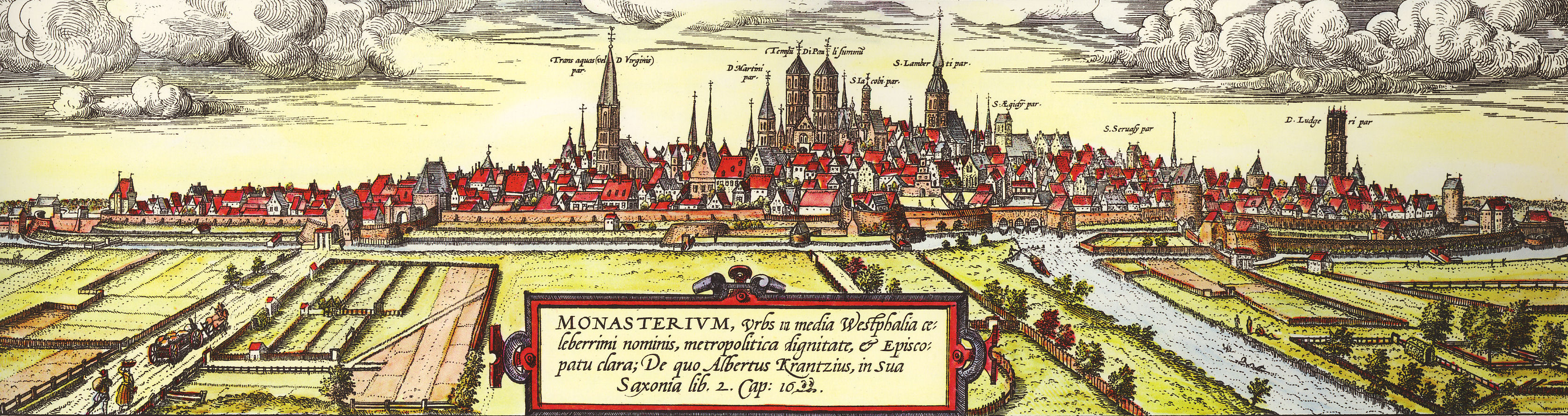
View from the south-west of Münster in 1570 as seen by Remius Hogenberg. On the left is the Überwasserkiche, in the center is St. Pauls Cathedral and to its right St. Lambert's Church, and on the far right is the Ludgerikirche

== World War II ==
During World War II Münster was maintained as the headquarters (Hauptsitz) for the 6th Military District (Wehrkreis) of the German Wehrmacht, under the command of Infantry General (General der Infanterie) Gerhard Glokke. Originally made up of Westphalia and the Rhineland, after the Battle of France it was expanded to include the Eupen - Malmedy district of Belgium. The headquarters controlled military operations in Münster, Essen, Düsseldorf, Wuppertal, Bielefeld, Coesfeld, Paderborn, Herford, Minden, Detmold, Lingen, Osnabrück, Recklinghausen, Gelsenkirchen, and Cologne. Münster was the home station for the VI and XXIII Infantry Corps (Armeekorps), as well as the XXXIII and LVI Panzerkorps. Münster was also the home of the 6th, 16th and 25th Panzer Division; the 16th Panzergrenadier Division; and the 6th, 26th, 69th, 86th, 106th, 126th, 196th, 199th, 211th, 227th, 253rd, 254th, 264th, 306th, 326th, 329th, 336th, 371st, 385th, and 716th Infantry Divisions (Infanterie-division). Due to the prominent presence of the military, Münster was a guaranteed Allied target. About 91% of the Old City and 63% of the entire city was destroyed by Allied air raids. In the 1950s the Old City was rebuilt to match its pre-war state, though many of the surrounding buildings were replaced with cheaper modern structures. The Bishop of Münster in the 1940s was Cardinal Clemens August Graf von Galen, one of the most prominent critics of the Nazi government. In retaliation for his success, Münster was heavily garrisoned during WWII and five large complexes of barracks are still a feature of the city.

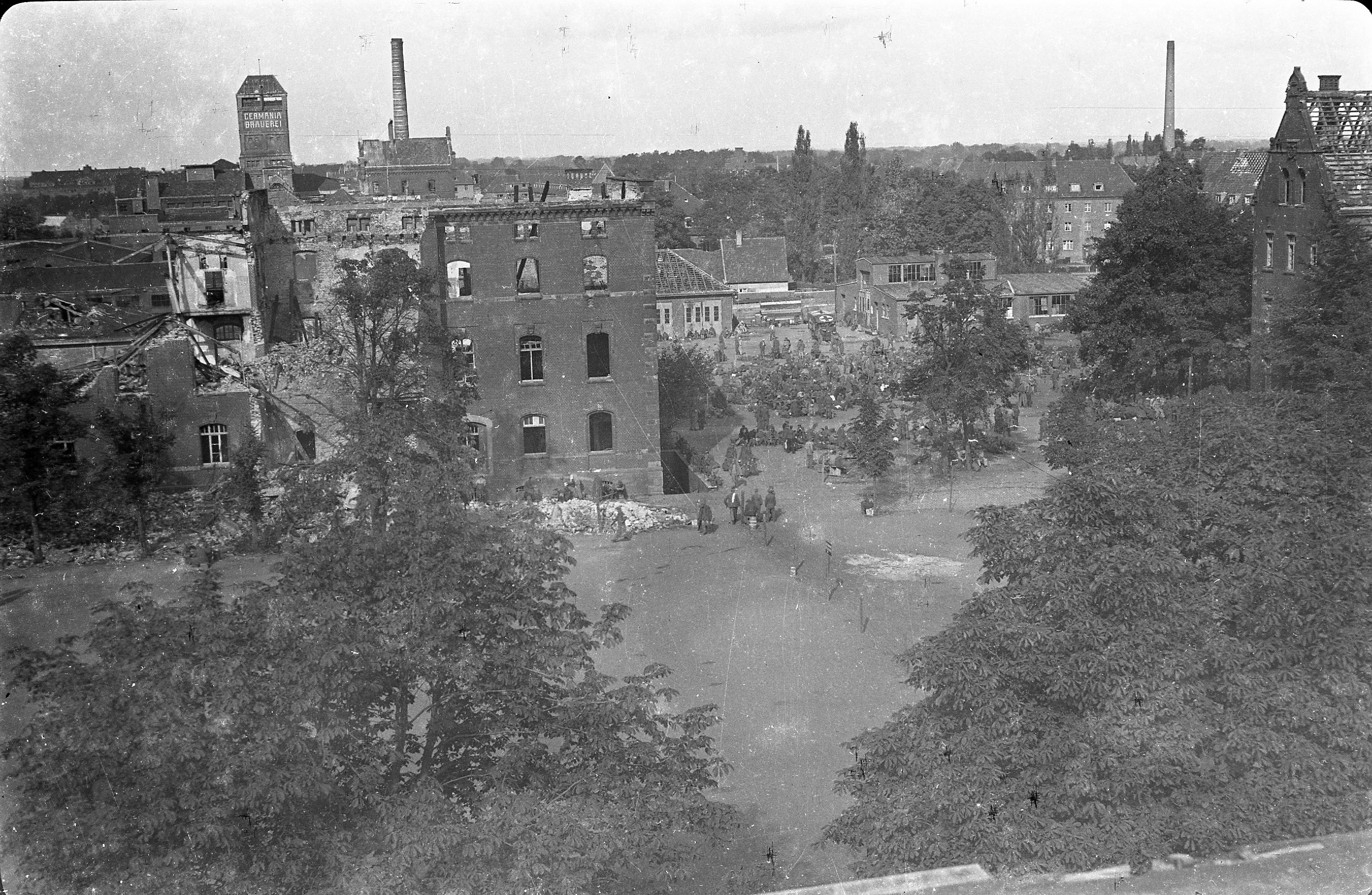

== Postwar period ==
From 1974 onward, the city was the residence of the American artist Moondog, an eccentric individual who idolized postwar Germany. In 2003, Münster hosted the Central European Olympiad in Informatics. In 2004, Münster won an honorable distinction: the LivCom-Award for the most livable city in the world with a population between 200,000 and 750,000. For more information about the honour, see the leaflet (.pdf) and the 10-minute DivX coded film: the 48mb-version or the 87mb-version from the official Münster-homepage.

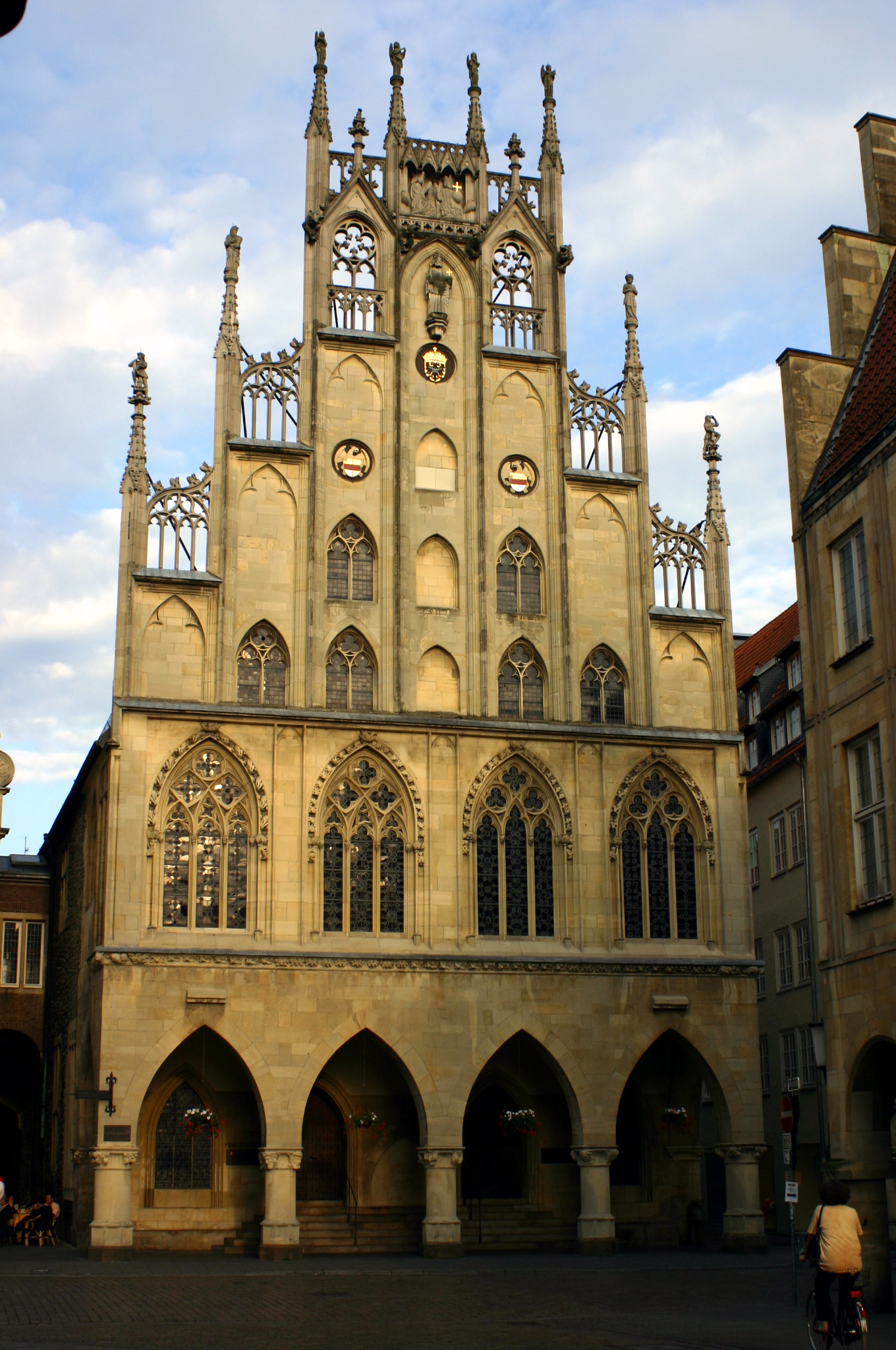
Town Hall in the Prinzipalmarkt.

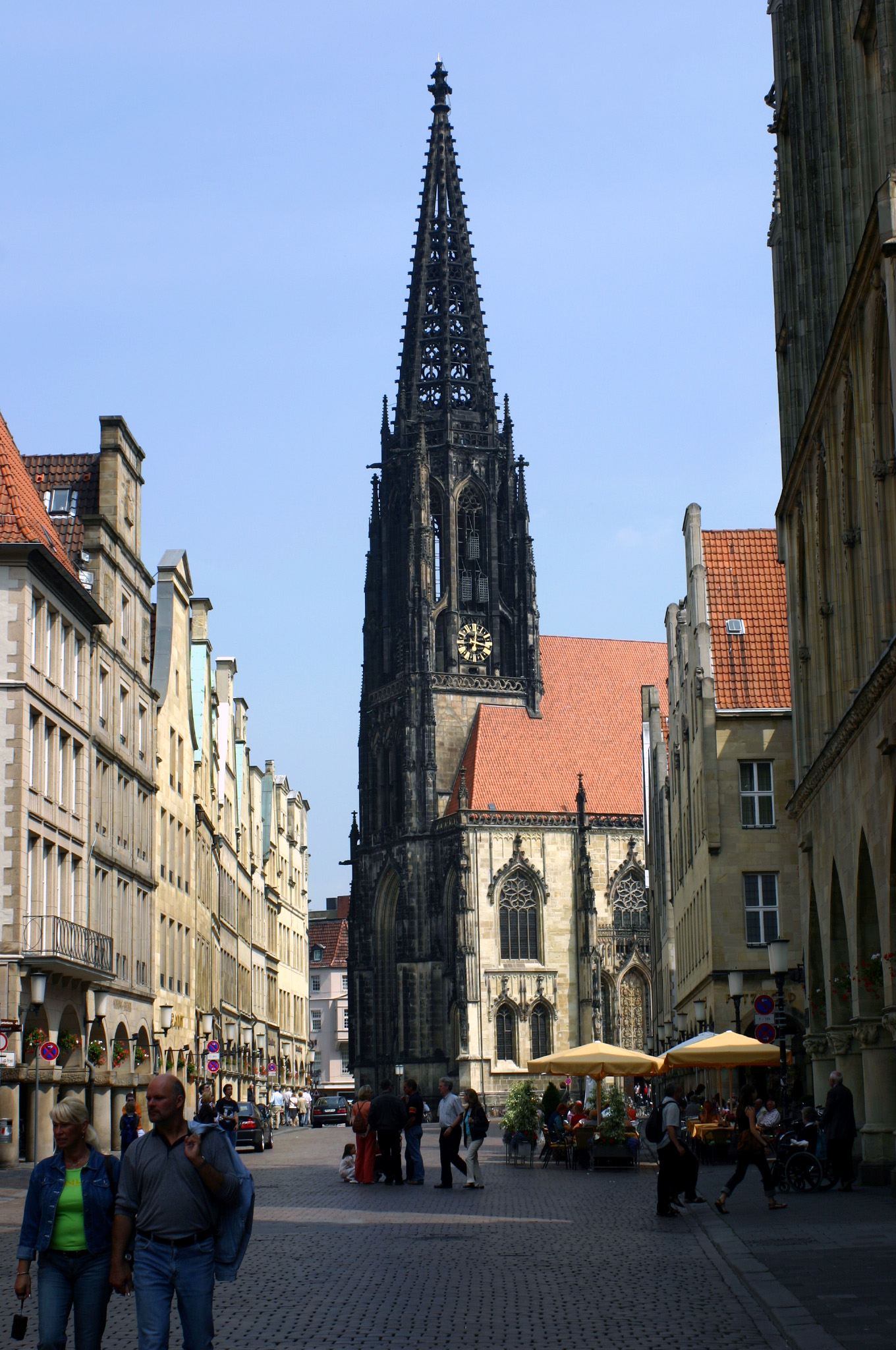
Münster: the Prinzipalmarkt with St Lambert's church.

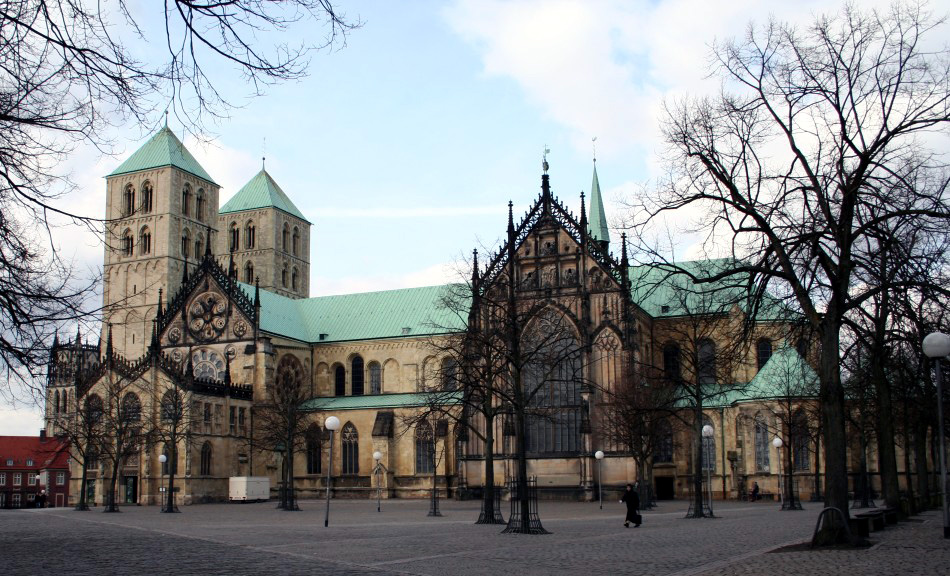
St. Paul's Cathedral.

== See also ==
- Timeline of Münster
