= Heinrich August Erhard =

German physician, archivist and historian

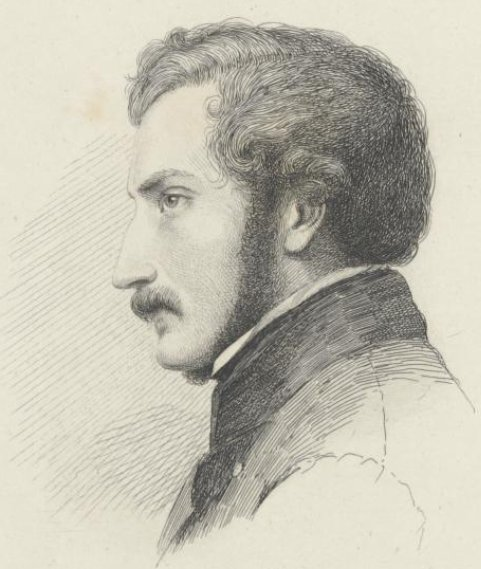
- Born: 13 February 1793; Erfurt
- Died: 22 June 1851; Münster
- Education: University of Göttingen; University of Erfurt
- Occupations: Physician, Archivist, Historian
- Years active: 1813–1851
- Known for: Contributions to Westphalian history and archaeology
- Medical career
- Profession: Physician, Archivist, Historian
- Field: History, archaeology; medicine
- Institutions: University of Erfurt; Provincial Archives of Magdeburg; Provincial Archives of Münster
- Research: Westphalian history; German history

Heinrich August Erhard (13 February 1793, in Erfurt – 22 June 1851, in Münster) was a German medical doctor, archivist and historian.

From 1809 he studied medicine, history and philology at the University of Göttingen, receiving his doctorates in medicine (1812) and philosophy (1813) from the University of Erfurt. After graduation, he worked as a physician in Erfurt (1813–16), as a military doctor (1815), as an assistant librarian (from 1816) and as a teacher at the Evangelical Gymnasium (Erfurt).

From 1822 to 1827 he served as librarian at the former university library in Erfurt. In 1824 he became an archivist at the provincial archives in Magdeburg while still maintaining his function at the Erfurt library. In 1831 he was appointed director of the provincial archives in Münster. After his death in 1851, he was succeeded at Münster by Roger Wilmans.

He was the editor of numerous articles in the Archiv für Geschichte und Alterthumskunde Westphalens ("Archive for History and Archaeology of Westphalia") and the Zeitschrift für vaterländische Geschichte und Altertumskunde ("Journal of Patriotic History and Archaeology").

== Selected works ==
- Geschichte des Wiederaufblühens wissenschaftlicher Bildung, vornehmlich in Teutschland bis zum Anfange der Reformation (3 volumes, 1827–32) – History on the rebirth of scientific education, especially in Germany up until the beginning of the Reformation.
- Mittheilungen zur Geschichte des Landfriedens in Teutschland, 1829 – On the history of Landfrieden in Germany.
- Erfurt mit seinen Umgebungen, 1829 – Erfurt with its surroundings.
- Nachricht von den bei Beckum entdeckten alten Gräbern, 1836 – News of ancient tombs discovered in Beckum.
- Geschichte Münsters, 1837 – History of Münster.
- Westfälisches Urkendenbuch (2 volumes, 1847–51) – Westphalian register.
