= Domfreiheit =

Land surrounding a cathedral in the HRE subject to ecclesiastical privileges

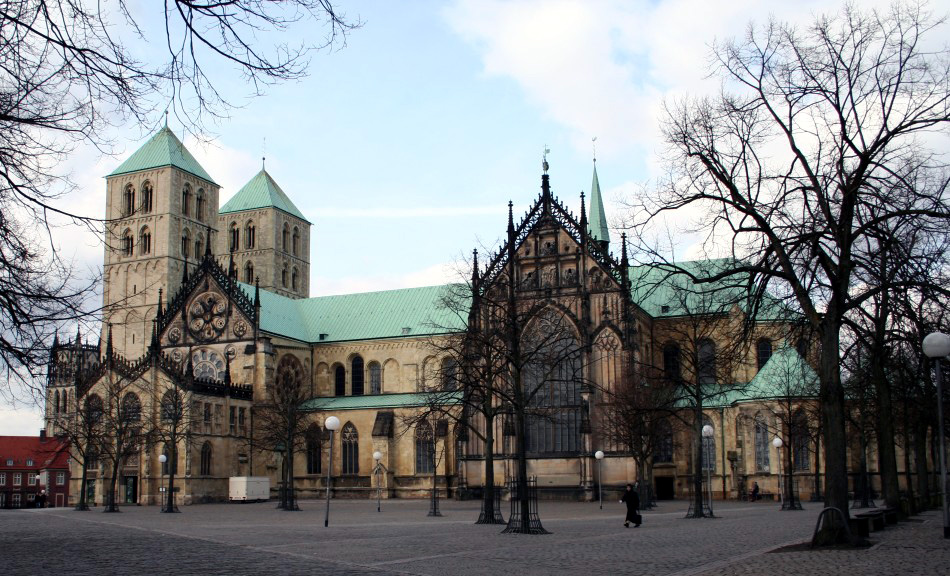
St.-Paulus-Dom in Münster in the Domplatz

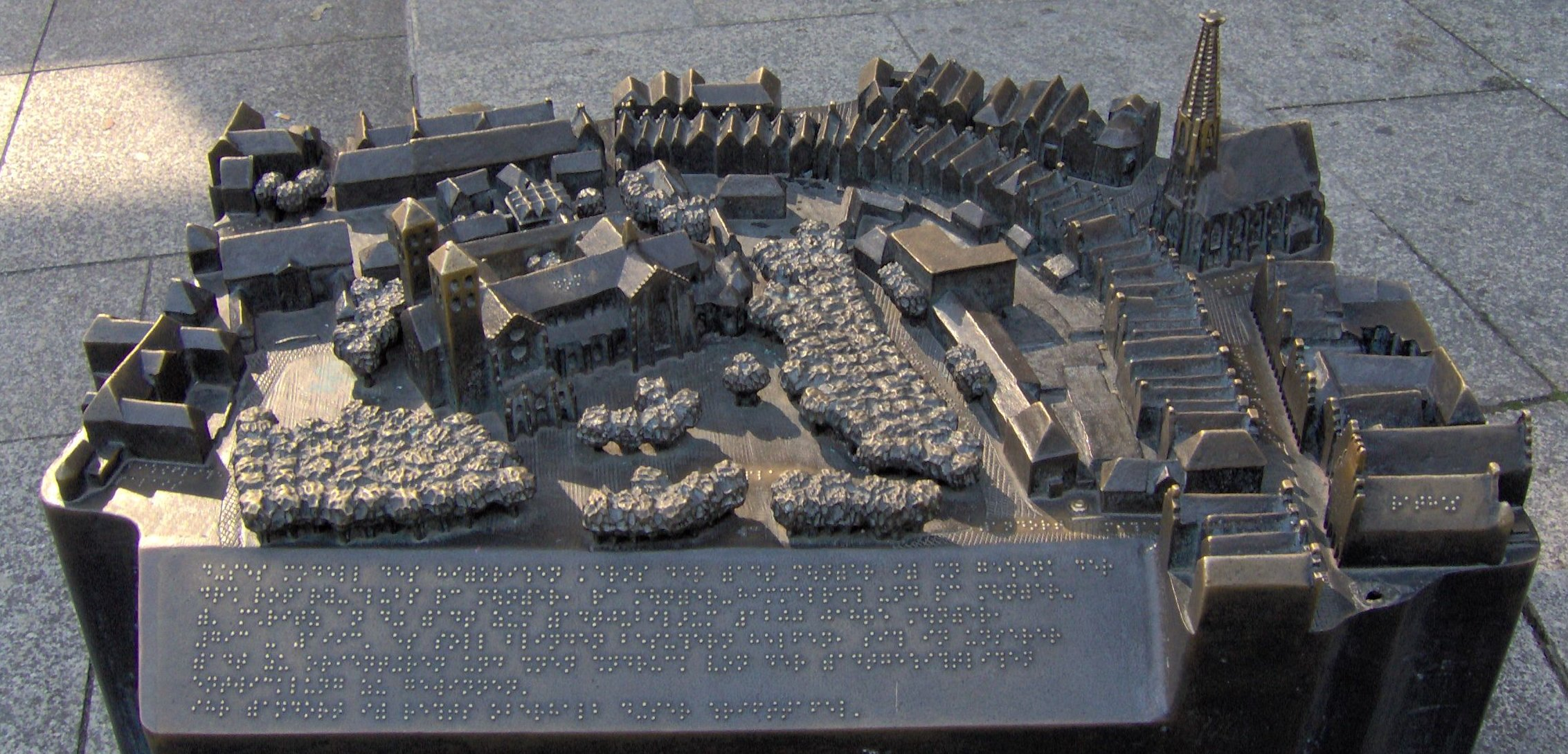
Model of the Domplatz and Prinzipalmarkt in Münster

In the Holy Roman Empire, the Domfreiheit (German: Cathedral Freedom) or Domimmunität (Cathedral Immunity) was the area immediately around the seat of the Bishop of a cathedral and its cathedral chapter, which was managed by the Domdechant; the English term is cathedral close. This area stretched only a few hundred metres from the outbuildings of the cathedral, at most, and was usually surrounded by a fortified wall (Domburg). They belonged to the secular domain or Hochstift of the bishop.

The area of the Domfreiheit was not part of the surrounding city's jurisdiction, but had its own jurisdiction, which included both the clergy and their servants. It contained the residences of the Domherren and their staff. This area was not subject to civic taxes – hence the term "Freiheit" (Freedom). There were, thus, two distinct sovereign entities within the city walls.

This led to ever greater tension in many cities over the centuries, as is clear, for example, from the entry for 1612 in the Speyerer Chronicle by town secretary Christoph Lehmen. He says: "There have been many long and distinct quarrels between the citizenry and the clergy in the state. Therefore King Rudolph ordained by treaty that the civic council should be in charge of it."

Where the Reformation found root, most cloisters were secularised and, as a rule, the Domfreiheit also ceased to exist. It did not last much longer in the cities which remained Catholic. With the secularisation of the Diocese of Bremen as Bremen-Verden in 1648, after almost eighty years as a Lutheran bishopric, its Domfreiheit in the centre of the city came under Swedish control. From 1715 it belonged to Hanover and only in 1803 did it come under the control of the surrounding city. After the abolition of the Diocese of Ratzeburg in the Reformation, its property was incorporated into the Principality of Ratzeburg, which was awarded to the duchy of Mecklenburg in 1648 and formed the western part of Mecklenburg-Strelitz after 1701. The rest of the city of Ratzeburg, however, belonged to the Duchy of Lauenburg.

Relatively well preserved Domfreiheiten include those in Halberstadt, Hildesheim, Magdeburg, Merseburg, Münster, Meissen, Naumburg and Trier.

== Bibliography ==
- Ernst Schubert und Jürgen Görlitz, Die Inschriften des Naumburger Doms und der Domfreiheit, Berlin 1959.
- Ursula Hoppe, Ursula, Die Paderborner Domfreiheit: Untersuchungen zu Topographie, Besitzgeschichte und Funktionen, München 1975. (Unpublished dissertation, Münster 1971).
