= Domburg (civic structure) =

A Domburg (German: Cathedral Castle) was the cathedral close or area in many old European diocesan seats around the cathedral surrounded by a large fortified wall and only accessible through gatehouse. Within the Domburg was the cathedral, additional churches and chapels (often), the bishop's palace, the houses of the members of the cathedral chapter, workshops and kitchen gardens.

The fortification served to protect the bishop, Cathedral chapter and their servants, but also served as a safehaven for the neighbouring labourers and merchants. The outer fortifications (city wall) which protected the whole city, were usually built after the Domburg and often remained weaker. The fortified cathedral area was imbued with special privileges (rights and freedoms) and was therefore often known as the Domfreiheit. It was the central hub of the city.

The lines of the old Domburg are still clearly visible in Münster, Paderborn, Hildesheim (Domhof) and Naumburg (Domplatz, accessed from the back of the cathedral). In addition, chronicles and archaeology provide evidence for the Domburg in Bremen and the Hammaburg in Hamburg.
