= Historical City Hall of Münster =

Historic building in Germany

Coordinates: 51°57′42″N 7°37′41″E

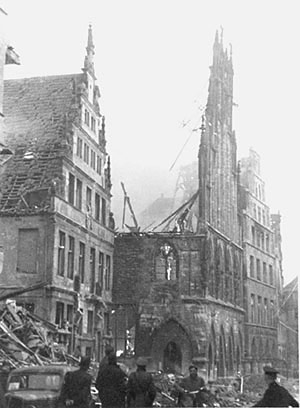
After being bombed by the Anglo-Americans in 1944

The Historical City Hall of Münster (German: Rathaus Münster), located in the centre of Prinzipalmarkt 10, is a well-known and much-visited landmark of the city of Münster, alongside Münster Cathedral, with over 120,000 visitors recorded at the site in 2012. It rose to prominence during the negotiations for the Peace of Westphalia Treaty of 1648, which concluded the Thirty Years' War in Western Europe; and the Eighty Years' War between Spain and the Republic of the Seven United Netherlands.

The Gothic structure was heavily damaged during World War II, it was rebuilt true to the original from 1950 to 1958. Though the building is occasionally used for council meetings, since 1907 the official residences of the Lord Mayor and the city administration have moved to nearby properties at Klemensstraße 10, Heinrich-Brünig-Straße and Syndikatsgasse.

The monument's contributions to European history were officially recognised on April 15, 2015, when the European Commission awarded the town halls of Münster and Osnabrück the European Heritage Seal as "Sites of the Peace of Westphalia".

== History ==
Due to the destruction of all documents housed in the city's archive pertaining to its history during the regime of the Anabaptists in 1534 and 1535, all information prior to this timeframe is based on documents stored outside of the city and its archives. Thus, the full history of the building cannot be reliably established prior to 1530.

=== Construction ===
Münster was granted city status circa 1170. In order to facilitate meetings and court proceedings by members of the city council who acted as judges and lay judges, a simple timber-framed building was constructed directly opposite the Michaelistor to the Domburg, in the vicinity of the episcopal catherdral area near the Prinzipalmarkt. This occurred sometime during the mid 12th century.

The Grade I listed half-timbered building, located 12 metres east of the Prinzipalmarkt, was likely substituted before the year 1200. This building was the first recorded assembly place for the judiciary in 1250. The Council Chamber, placed in the lower part of the structure, was known as the Hall of Peace.

At the beginning of the 14th century, the area was extended with the placement of another building situated in front of the existing structure. This extension is believed to have been built around the year 1320 when Johann III. von Deckenbrock was mayor, and is believed to have been created to give locals a forum to congregate in the open, instead of confining themselves to the row of houses present on the Prinzipalmarkt. In circa 1395, the hall was extended by a four-metre-long porch that protruded into the market. The porch was supported by five round pillars directly on the roadside, serving as part of the characteristic archway of Prinzipalmarkt.

When the Prinzipalmarkt was first divided, the space for the town hall was likely left free in this location - in agreement with the bishop, as the ruling authority of the town and state - since on old cadastral maps, a free area with twice the width of other buildings was noted in the position of the town hall. This decision speaks to the citizenry of Münster's self-assurance, notably the elite city nobility who were the so-called heirs to the divisions. In placing the town hall in direct view from the Münster cathedral and the episcopal palace, they demonstrated their drive for freedom and the goal of self-government over the bishop. The addition of the ornate architecture and façade of the town hall in the late-fourteenth century was undoubtedly a provocation for the latter, whose passage to the cathedral was impeded by the structure.

=== 16th century to World War II ===
Between the sixteenth century and World War II, the Town Hall underwent several renovations. In 1576 and 1577 the roof of the rear part of the building above the council chamber and armoury was rebuilt. The original north-south gable roof was replaced with a new east-west gable roof similar to the front part of the building. The master craftsmen employed for the conversion project marked their work in blue clinker bricks in the east gable. Further extension to the hall was built in 1602, known as the Stoveken, or Winter Council Chamber and consisted of two floors. The addition was designed due to the difficulty of heating the main council chamber. Despite having a fireplace, members situated furthest from the fire were reportedly freezing whilst those nearest to the fire experienced extreme warmth. Thus the council moved to the smaller chambers during the cold months. In 1892 a third floor was added, however, the structure was destroyed during World War II and rebuilt in the 1950s. This was replaced by a new stair tower.
