= Prinzipalmarkt =

Coordinates: 51°57′44″N 7°37′41″E

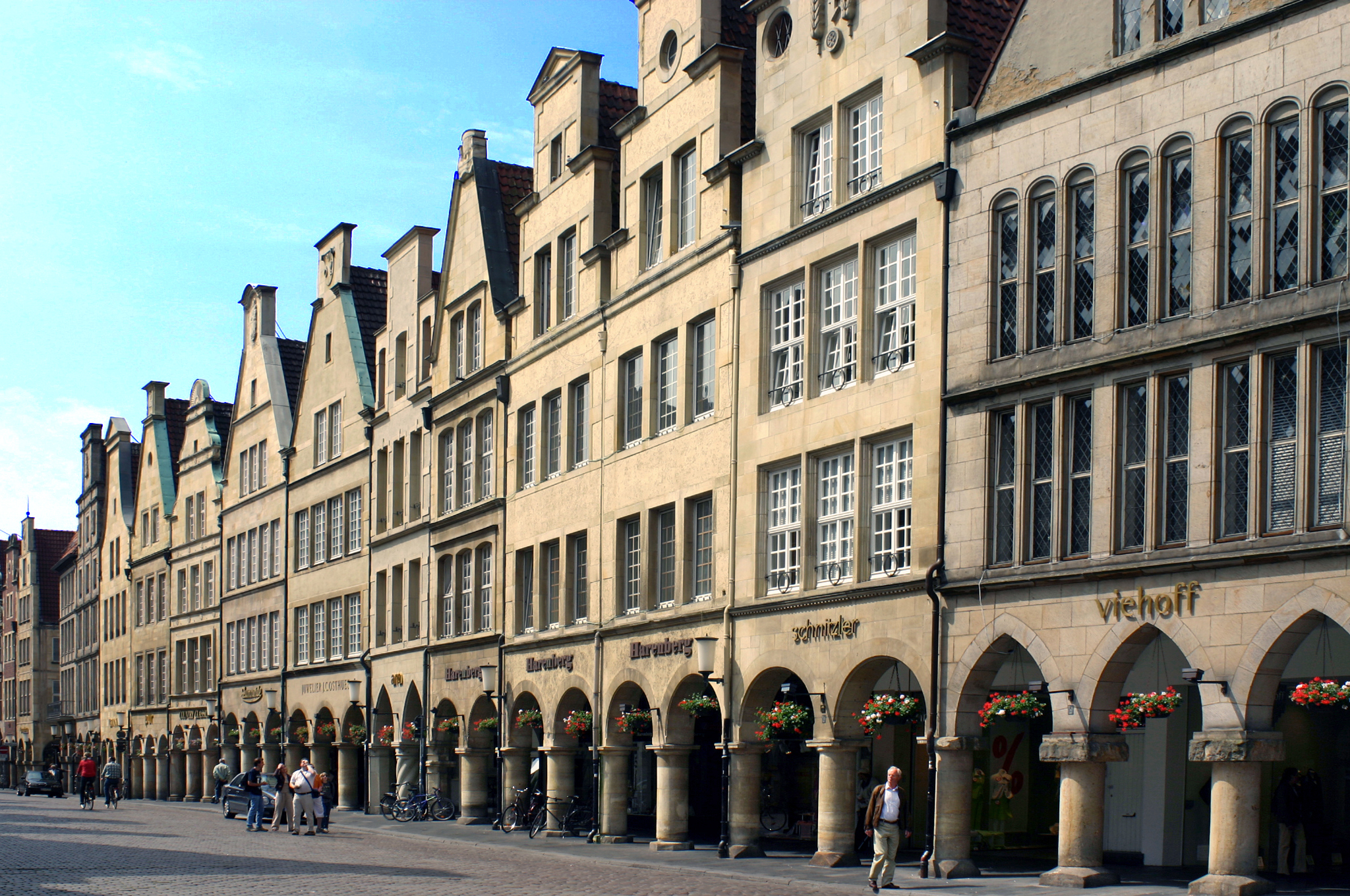
Prinzipalmarkt in central Münster

The Prinzipalmarkt (German pronunciation: [pʁɪntsiˈpaːlmaʁkt]) is the historic principal marketplace of Münster, Germany. It is shaped by historic buildings with picturesque pediments attached to one another. It extends from St. Lambert's Church (Lambertikirche) in the north to the Townhouse Tower (Stadthausturm) in the south and is home to luxurious shops and cafés. The centre of the eastern side, opposite the south-eastern entrance to Cathedral Square (Domplatz), is dominated by the Historical City Hall of Münster.

Having been largely destroyed during World War II, the Prinzipalmarkt was reconstructed from 1947 to 1958, most buildings true to the original.

== Literature ==
- Karl-Heinz Kirchhoff: Der Prinzipalmarkt mit Michaelisplatz, Gruetgasse, Syndikatgasse und Syndikatplatz. Münster : Aschendorff, 2001, ISBN 3-402-06643-2
