= Eli Marcus =

Jewish German playwright, actor and poet (1854–1935)

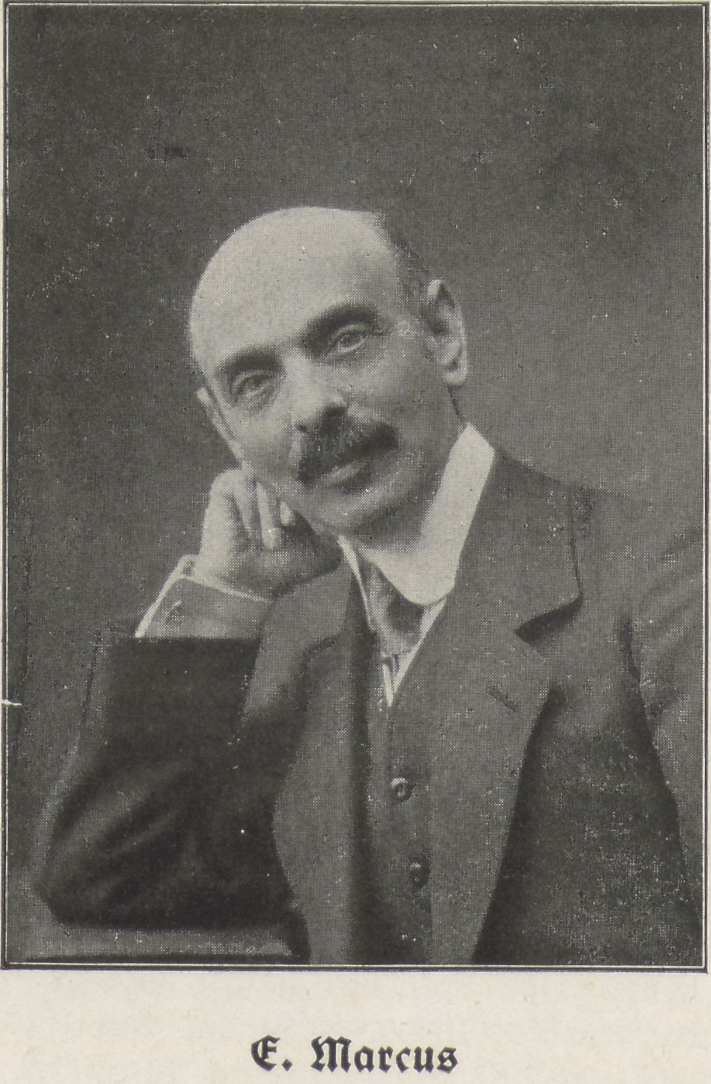
Eli Marcus 1914

Elias "Eli" Marcus (26 January 1854 – 3 September 1935), also known under the pseudonym Natzohme) was a Jewish German dialect poet, playwright and actor from the city of Münster.

== Biography ==
Eli Marcus was born in Münster on January 26, 1854, the eldest son of Samuel Marcus (1810–1890), a tanner from Burgsteinfurt, and his wife Betty Weingarten (1818–1893), who was born in Bruchhausen-Vilsen near Bremen.

His father had been running a leather business in Münster since 1842. This business led to the founding of the shoe store "S. Marcus" on the city Roggenmarkt city square in 1875. Eli Marcus received his early education in Münster at the school operated by the Marks-Haindorf Foundation. After graduating from secondary school, he spent three years at a private boarding institution for Jewish boys and young men, founded by Philipp Heidenheim in Sondershausen. From 1870 to 1872, he completed a commercial apprenticeship in Bochum before returning to Münster. After his father's death in 1890, he managed the shoestore together with his brother Julius.

In 1893, he joined the Association for the Defense against Anti-Semitism (German: Verein zur Abwehr des Antisemitismus) (1890–1933). Marcus was a committed member of Hermann Landois' Zoological Evening Society (German: Zoologische Abendgesellschaft). He was closely acquainted with the sculptor August Schmiemann (1846–1927), the music director Julius Otto Grimm (1827–1903) as well as the writers Augustin Wibbelt (1862–1947) and Hermann Löns (1866–1914). He served as a lay judge at the local commercial court, supported the independent artists' association "Schanze", and was a member of the jury that selected art objects for the "Das schöne Münster" exhibition held in the 1920s.

He gained recognition in the Münsterland region for his theatrical works written in the Low German dialect, and additionally soon was regarded as favored performer of his own plays. Newspaper articles from this period underscore his esteem as playwright. He often wrote his folk plays under the pseudonym Natzohme, the name of his signature role in the play "Mester Tüntelpott". After the turn of the century, Marcus increasingly devoted himself to Low German poetry, while continuing to engage with the theater. Together with Landois, he published a collection of Low German poems.

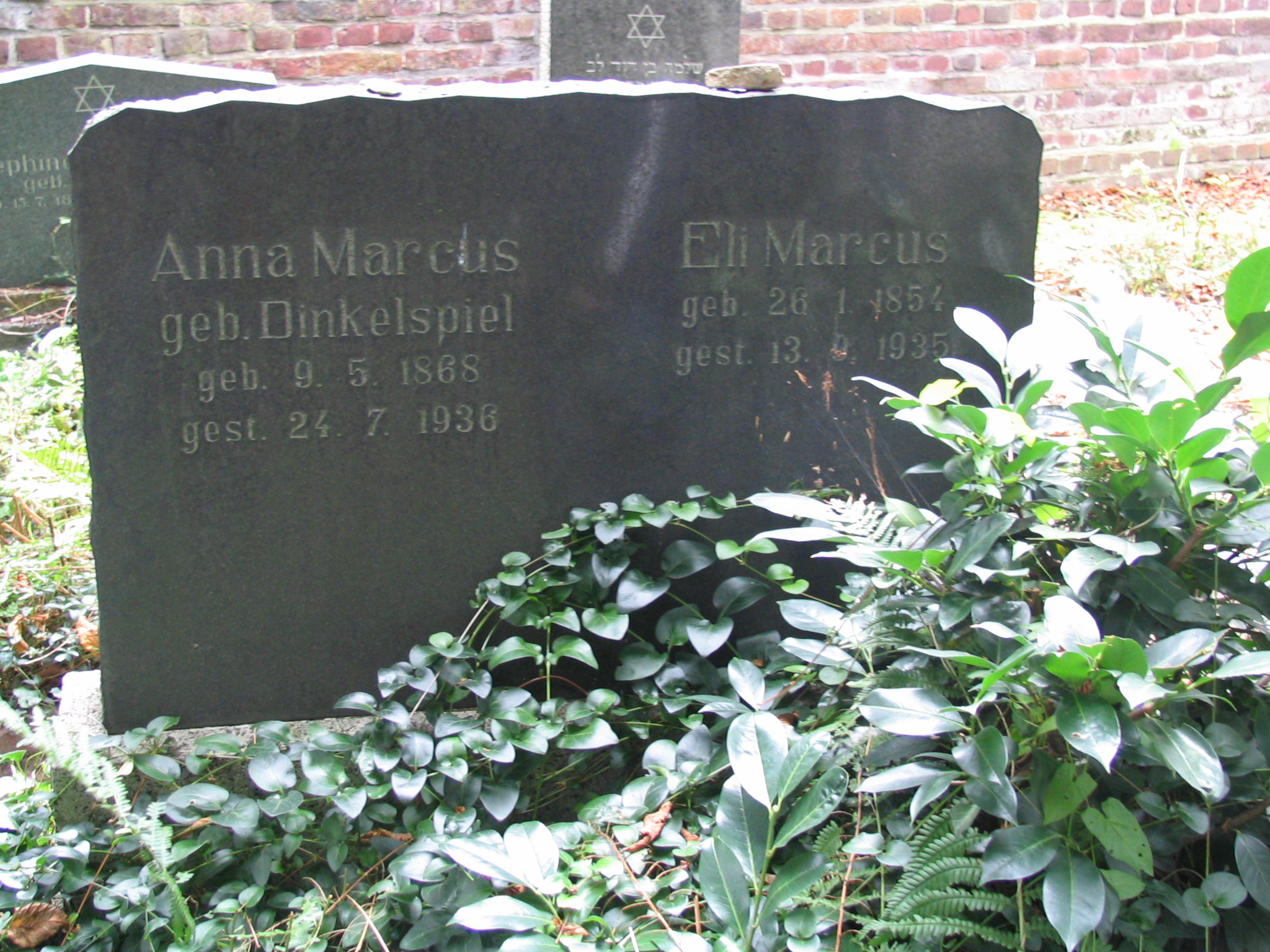
Grave of Anna and Eli Marcus in the Münster Jewish Cemetery

After his son Ernst (a non-commissioned officer and recipient of the Iron Cross First Class and the Silver Friedrich August Medal) was killed in action on 25 July 1917 during First World War, Eli Marcus gave up his shoe business and turned to dealing in antiques and modern art. The upheavals of the November Revolution in 1918 deeply unsettled his convictions; as a devoted German patriot and committed Prussian, Marcus viewed the changing times with growing unease and gradually retreated from public life. The hyperinflation further destroyed much of his fortune.

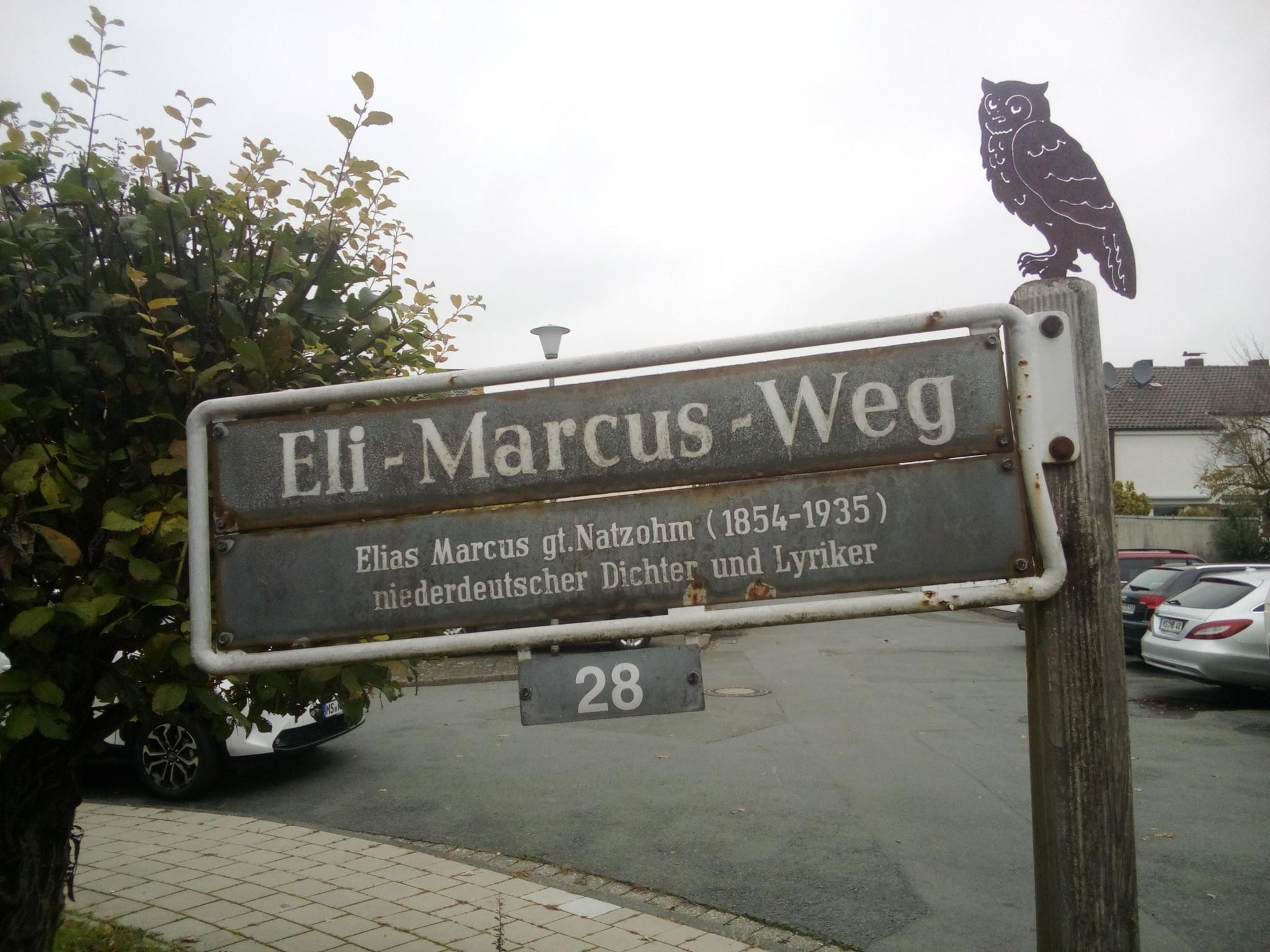
Eli-Marcus-Weg in Münster

His final public appearance took place at the age of 79 in the form of a radio interview. By the time he turned 80, the city of Münster no longer commemorated his birthday. During the Nazi era, Eli Marcus' plays were no longer performed and gradually faded into obscurity. In 1961, the city of Münster named a street in the Kinderhaus district in his honor. Two other German cities, Greven and Emsdetten, also paid tribute to Eli Marcus by naming streets after him.

He was buried in the Jewish Cemetery in Münster.

== Works ==
=== Plays and narratives ===
- Die Pfahlbauern oder Der Kampf ums Dasein. Plattdeutsches Fastnachtsspiel [Low German Shrovetide Play]. Münster 1881.
- Eine Stunde im Polizeigefängniß oder Das fidele Höffken. Plattdeutsches Fastnachtsspiel. Münster 1883.
- Jan van Leyden, König der Wiedertäufer oder Libbetken Klutenkemper's Brautfahrt oder Der münstersche Bettelstudent. Plattdeutsches Fastnachtsspiel. 1st and 2nd edition: Osnabrück 1884. 84 pages; 3rd edition: Bielefeld 1889.
- Jérôme Napoleon, König von Westfalen oder Morgen wird es wieder lustik. Plattdeutsches Fastnachtsspiel. Münster 1885.
- King Bell oder die Münsteraner in Afrika. Plattdeutsches Fastnachtsspiel. Münster 1886.
- General Kaulbarsch oder Et wärd gothisk! Plattdeutsches Fastnachtsspiel. Münster 1887.
- Madame Limousin oder Wi häbt et jä! Große carnevalistische Burlangerie. Münster 1888. IV, 50 pages.
- Schulte Graute Schlemm oder Sklaverei und Liebe oder Wu krieg wi't up? Große romantische Posse [Grand Romantic Farce]. Münster 1889. XII, 61 pages.
- Mingelmängel oder Die lustigen Weiber von Münster oder Laot suusen! Plattdeutsches Fastnachtsspiel. Münster 1890.
- Fräulein Minna Oder die Hexenkuhle in den Baumbergen Oder Män nich hassebassen! Plattdeutsches Fastnachtsspiel. Münster 1891.
- Graf Tucks oder Cavalleria lusticana oder Spiel dich nich up! Große karnevalistische Ritter- und Räuber-Posse mit Gesang und Tanz in vier Akten [Grand Carnival Farce of Knights and Robbers, with Song and Dance in Four Acts]. Mitsdörffer, Münster 1892. 53 pages
- Der große Prophet Jan van Leyden oder Siske! oder Holland in Nauth! Plattdt. Fastnachtsspiel. Münster 1893, new edition.
- Plumps Anton! oder Französke Russen und latiniske Buuren. Plattdt. Fastnachtsspiel. Münster 1894.
- Mester Tüntelpott oder De aolle Wallhiege oder Dat wull! Große karnevalistische Posse mit Gesang und Tanz [Grand Carnival Farce with Song and Dance]. 2nd edition. Abendgesells. des Zoolog. Gartens, Münster 1895. 30 pages
- Söffken van Gievenbeck oder Ruhig Franz! oder He treckt up de Lieftucht. Plattdt. Fastnachtsspiel. Der Westfale, Münster 1896. 70 pages
- Hoppmarjännken oder Schichten un Deehlen oder Nu män sinnig an! Plattdt. Fastnachtsspiel. Mitsdörffer, Münster 1897. 32 pages
- Kirro de Buck oder De Huoltwüörmer in China oder Daovon aff! Plattdt. Fastnachtsspiel. Mitsdörffer, Münster 1898.
- Ohm Paul oder De verharmloste Zwangsinnung oder Dat is'n Appel. Plattdt. Fastnachtsspiel. Münster 1900.
- De graute Kumeet off Weg met'n Dreck! Begiäbenheit in eenen Akt. Nao een aoll Döhnken torecht klamüsert. Plattdt. Fastnachtsspiel. Seiling, Münster 1901. 14 pages
- Hiärtens-Fennand off Buernsohn un Küötterjunge. Plattdt. Fastnachtsspiel. Fredebeul Koenen, Essen 1902. 21 pages
- Lünnings Lena off: Mien Een un Alles. Truerige Hiärtensgeschichte tom Dautlachen. Plattdt. Fastnachtsspiel. Fredebeul Koenen, Essen 1902. 24 pages
- Jans Krax off Dat aolle Schamiesken! Verwesselung in eenen Akt nao een aolt Stücksken torecht stuckedeert. Plattdt. Fastnachtsspiel. Münster 1903.
- Düörgemös. Plattdütske Riemsels, Vertällsels un Döhnkes. Fredebeul Koenen, Essen 1903. 77 pages
- Up Bruutschau off Thresken un Blässken! Kohmädchenspiel in eenen Akt. Plattdt. Fastnachtsspiel. Münster 1903.
- Usse Dölfken oder Latienske Buern oder Was kräucht da in dem Busch herum? Plattdt. Fastnachtsspiel. Münster 1905.
- He hät sienen Dag off Schnieder un Mürken. Posse in eenen Akte. Münster 1909. 19 pages
- Aolle Döhnkes un niee Vertällsels. Aschendorff, Münster 1910. 120 pages
- De Suohn. Liäbensspiel in eenen Uptoch. Plattdt. Fastnachtsspiel. Greve, Münster 1920. 18 pages
- De guede Maondag. Volksstück mit Gesang und Tanz. Plattdt. Fastnachtsspiel. Münster 1921. 56 pages
- Graute Schlemm. Gesangsposse. Plattdt. Fastnachtsspiel. Münster 1922. 62 pages
- Piäpper-Potthast. Vertällsels in Mönstersk Platt. Münster 1924. 103 pages

=== Poetry ===
- Schnippsel vom Wege des Lebens. Gereimtes und Ungereimtes in Hoch und Platt. Fredebeul Koenen, Essen 1902. XII, 165 pages
- Sunnenblomen. Dichtungen in der Mundart des Münsterlandes. Greve, Münster 1913. 133 pages

=== Other publications ===
- Professor Landois. Lebensbild eines westfälischen Gelehrten-Originals. Lenz, Leipzig 1907. 123 pages

== Sources ==
in chronological order of publication

- Hermann Schönhoff (1914), Geschichte der Westfälischen Dialektliteratur, Münster: A. Greve, pp. 27–30, 32, 40–41
- Gisela Weiss (1989), "Eli Marcus — ein jüdischer Mundartautor Westfalens", in Hans Taubken and Siegfried Kessemeier and Robert Peters and Ulrich Weber (ed.), Jahrbuch der Augustin Wibbelt-Gesellschaft e.V., nr. 5, Münster: Regensberg, pp. 70–77, ISBN 3-7923-0586-0
- Gisela Möllenhoff and Rita Schlautmann-Overmeyer, ed. (1995), Jüdische Familien in Münster, 1918–1945, Teil 1: Biographisches Lexikon, Münster: Westfälisches Dampfboot, pp. 285–287, ISBN 978-3-929586-48-0
- Walter Gödden and Iris Nölle-Hornkamp, ed. (1997), Westfälisches Autorenlexikon Bd. 3. 1850 bis 1900, Schöningh, pp. 467–471, ISBN 3-506-79743-3, "Marcus, Eli"
- Manfred Schneider and Julian Voloj (2004), Eli Marcus. Ick weet en Land. Ausgewählte Texte und ein Lebensbild, Münster: Aschendorff, ISBN 3-402-05481-7
- Iris Nölle-Hornkamp and Hartmut Steinecke, ed. (2007), Westfälische Lebensstationen: Texte und Zeugnisse jüdischer Schriftstellerinnen und Schriftsteller aus Westfalen, Bielefeld: Aisthesis, pp. 518–519
- Siegfried Kessemeier (2007), "Jüdische Niederdeutschautoren. Erinnerung an Eli Marcus (1854–1935) und Carl van der Linde (1861–1930).", in Ingrid Straumer (ed.), Greten fragt: „Woans höllst du dat mit de Religion?“. 59. Beversen-Tagung. Jahrestagung für Niederdeutsch, 15. bis 17. September 2006 in Bad Beversen. Herausgegeben im Auftrag des Vorstands, Syke: Printhaus Dr., pp. 40–50
- Lexikon deutsch-jüdischer Autoren, Band 16: Lewi–Mehr. Herausgegeben vom Archiv Bibliographia Judaica, München: Saur, 2008, pp. 290–295, ISBN 978-3-598-22696-0, "Article Marcus, Eli"
- Gisbert Strotdrees (2024), "′Well röp mi dao deip in de Nacht?′ Jüdische Dichter des Niederdeutschen: Carl van der Linde und Eli Marcus", Jüdisches Landleben. Vergessene Welten in Westfalen. Das Landjudentum von seiner Entstehung seit dem Mittelalter bis zur völligen Zerstörung während des Nationalsozialismus, Münster: Landwirtschaftsverlag, pp. 68–73, ISBN 978-3-7843-5781-2
