= An American in the Making =

An American in the Making may refer to:

- An American in the Making: The Life Story of an Immigrant (1917) by M. E. Ravage, an immigrant autobiography exploring the tensions between assimilation and cultural identity.
- An American in the Making (1913), a silent movie directed by Carl Louis Gregory
