= Heidenheim =

Heidenheim may refer to:

- Heidenheim an der Brenz, town in Baden-Württemberg, southern Germany
  - 1. FC Heidenheim 1846, German football club from the city of Heidenheim
  - Heidenheim (district), district (Kreis) in the east of Baden-Württemberg
- Heidenheim, Bavaria, municipality in the Hahnenkamm, Weißenburg-Gunzenhausen district, Bavaria, Germany

== People with the surname ==
- Philipp Heidenheim (1814–1906), German rabbi and educator
- Wolf Heidenheim (1757–1832), German exegete and grammarian
