= Marcus Eli Ravage =

Jewish-American writer (1884–1965)

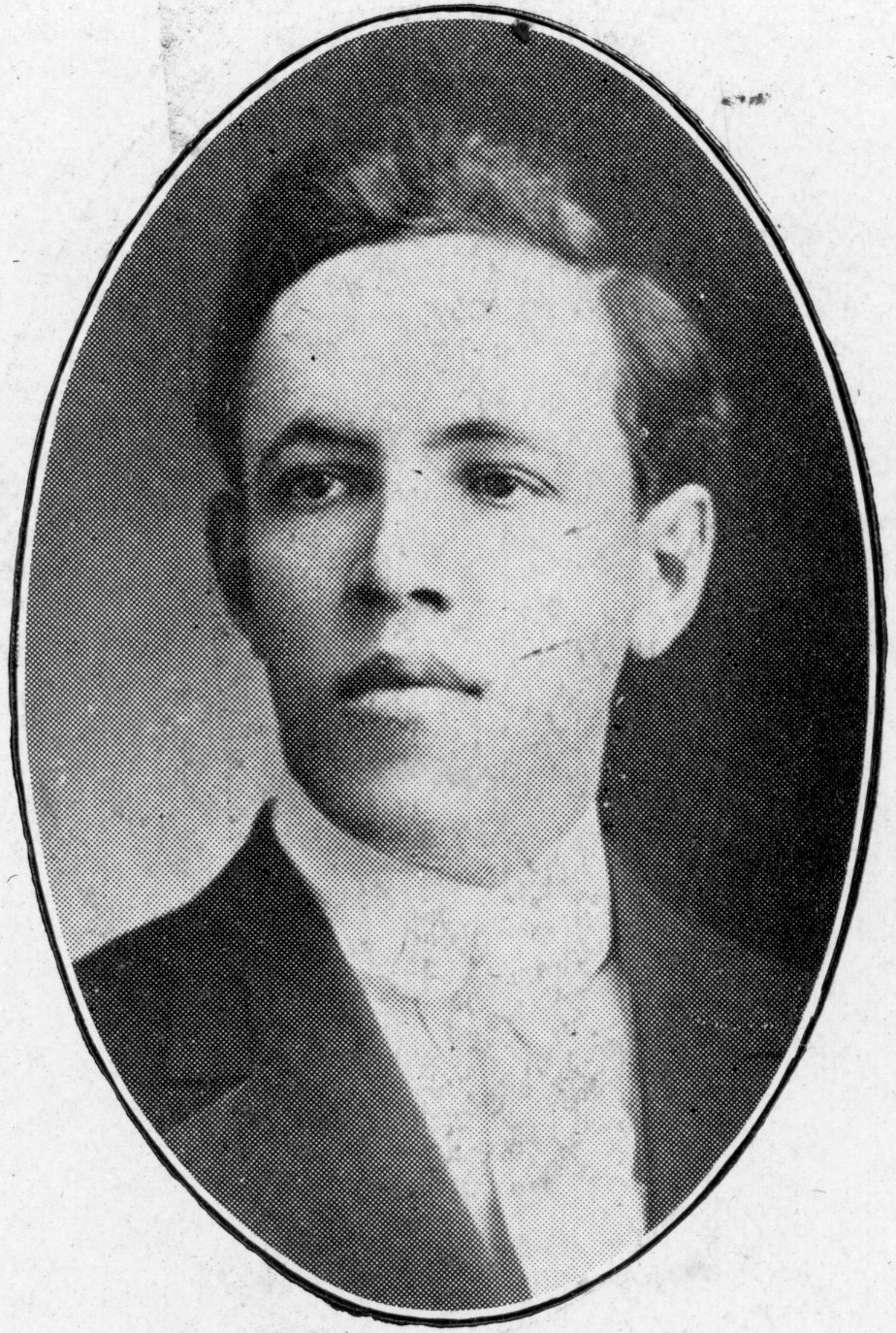
- Ravage in 1909
- Born: June 25, 1884; Bârlad, Kingdom of Romania
- Died: October 6, 1965 (aged 81); Grasse, France
- Citizenship: United States (from 1912); Stateless (1884–1912) (Note: Ravage was born 1884 as a Jew in the Kingdom of Romania. Under Article 7 of the 1866 Constitution of Romania, Jews were excluded from Romanian citizenship. Ravage was therefore a legal "alien" to Romania. He became a naturalized U.S. citizen in 1912.)
- Education: University of Missouri (BA), University of Illinois (MA)
- Occupation: Writer
- Years active: 1900s–1950s
- Known for: Early contributions to American migrant literature
- Notable work: An American in the Making (1917, autobiography)
- Spouses: Jeanne Louise Suzanne Martin; Denise Montel
- Children: 3

Marcus "Max" Eli Ravage (or Ravitch, born Revici; June 25, 1884 – October 6, 1965) was a Romanian-born Jewish American writer and journalist who divided his life between the United States and France.

He is known for An American in the Making (1917), a seminal immigrant autobiography exploring the tensions between assimilation and cultural identity. During the interwar period, Ravage wrote prolifically on immigration in the United States and on political affairs across Europe and America.

His satirical essays about antisemitism, published 1928, were later stripped of context and ideologically repurposed by Nazi propaganda – a conspiracist distortion further recycled in postwar antisemitic discourse.

Ravage also authored popular biographies of the Rothschild family and of Marie Louise, Napoleon's second wife. He served as European correspondent for the U.S. magazine The Nation, and contributed to Harper's Magazine, The New Republic, Current History, The New York Times, The Forward, the humor magazine Puck, The Century Magazine, The Saturday Evening Post, the British newspaper The Nation and various European publications.

== Name ==
Born and raised in Romania as Marcus (or Marcu) Eli Revici, he adapted the spelling of his name over the course of his migrations.

While later biographical summaries suggest that he may have already adopted his 'Americanized' surname Ravage upon arrival at the U.S. immigration inspection station at Ellis Island in 1900, early records from his educational trajectory indicate that during the decade between his immigration and eventual naturalization, he used the surname Ravitch, together with the forename Max. (Note: Attributed to multiple references:) Phonetic transcriptions of birth names streamlined for compliance with English pronunciation were common among Eastern European immigrants. Ravage's own account suggests that his transitional use of the name "Max" may have reflected broader patterns of Americanization rather than personal preference. (Note: The 1917 memoir, though published under the name Marcus Eli Ravage, introduces its autobiographical narrator as "Max". In Chapter 8, Ravage cites "Mordecai [..] had been changed to the insipid monosyllable Max" as one of several examples of the widespread Americanization and simplification of immigrant, particularly Hebrew, names, alongside Rebecca to Becky, Samuel to Sam, Abraham to Abe, and Israel to Izzy.) For his early steps as a writer, he also used the penname 'Max the Sleever' (then referencing his occupation as a garment worker).

Evidenced by the start of his professional publishing activity in 1917, with contributions to Harper's, Puck, and Century Magazine as well as the publication of An American in the Making, he would adopt the surname Ravage and reclaim the use of his forename Marcus together with his Hebrew middle name Eli.

During his later years in France – documented, for example, in publications for Le Petit Parisien, Vendredi, Ce soir and Vu – his name was also rendered as Mark‑Eli Ravage, or Marc‑Elie Ravage, sometimes with accent on the "É".

== Biography ==
Ravage was born 1884 in Bârlad as the youngest of four children to his father Judah Loeb Revici, a struggling grain merchant, and his mother Bella Rosenthal Revici.

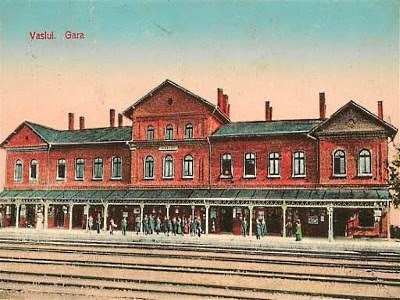
Old train station of Vaslui, from which Ravage began his journey to America.

While he was still a child, the family moved to nearby Vaslui, a town of some 12,000 people in 1900, about 31 percent of whom Jewish like the Revicis.

His sister Annie died when he was 11 years old. At the age of 14, he saw a cousin return to visit Vaslui, who had settled in New York City. The relative's unexpected reappearance in Vaslui, combined with his positive reports about America, contributed to local discussions about emigration, including Ravage's own.

At the age of sixteen, in the year 1900, Ravage joined the Fusgeyer movement (Jews fleeing increased antisemitism in Romania) and set off for America. According to a 1909 interview, at first he landed in Montreal and made his way to New York a few months later, where his cousins provided him with a room on Rivington Street on the Lower East Side. He worked in versatile jobs, from peddling chocolates and toys to tending bar and doing all sorts of general work in a saloon, and later making shirtsleeves in a sweat shop, while learning English in night school. Ravage pursued his education through self-directed workers' schools and private evening preparatory academies in New York City, later attending DeWitt Clinton High School to qualify for a state scholarship.

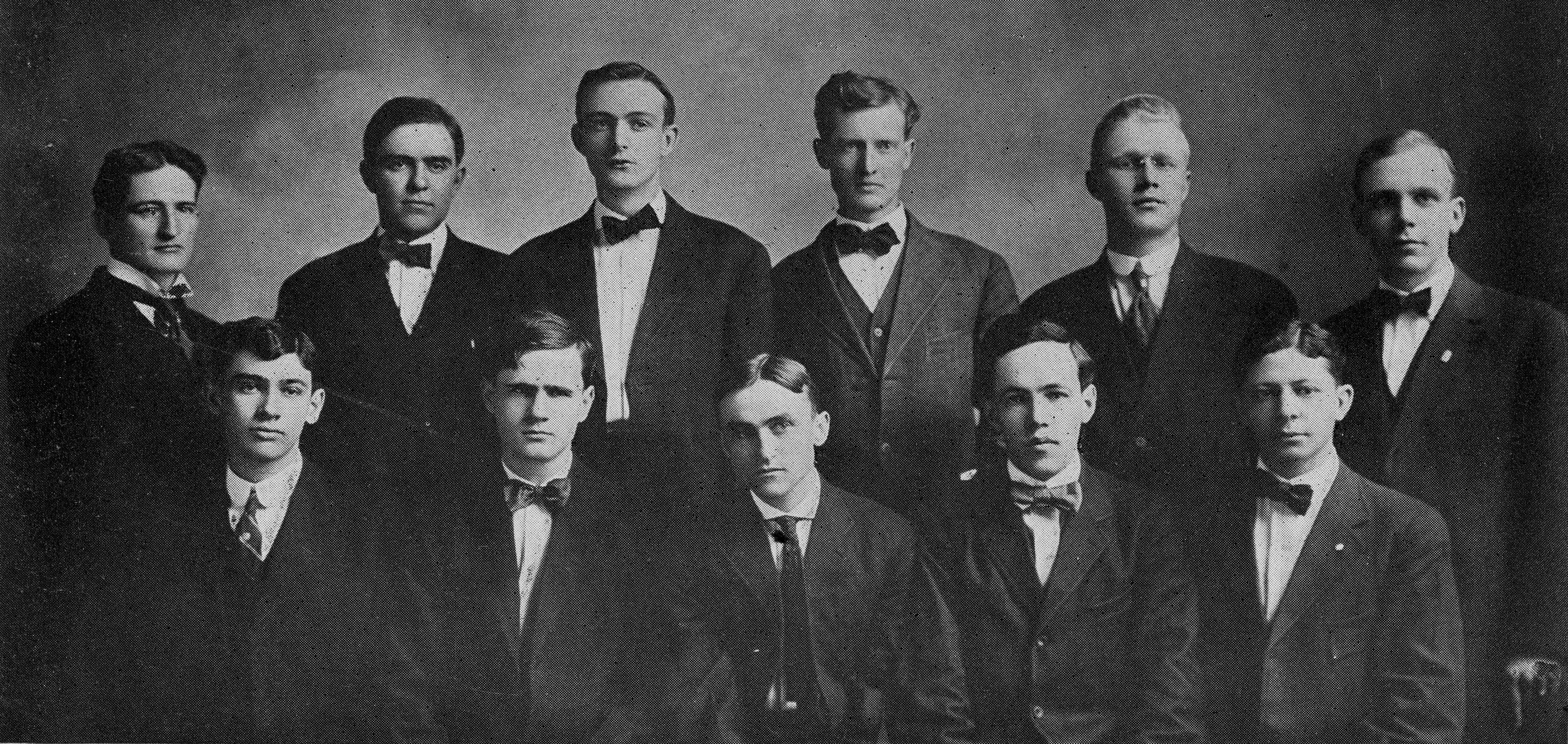
Marcus Eli Ravage, seated in the front row, second from right, with fellow students at the Asterisk Club, University of Missouri, 1909

In 1903, as a young adult, he was informed by mail of the deaths of his parents in Vaslui. His brothers Paul and Harry likewise came to New York.

He studied English at the University of Missouri in Columbia, Missouri from 1906 onward, where, according to the Columbia Missourian (1924), he was "the first New York Jew to attend the University". After earning a bachelor's degree in 1909, he transferred to the University of Illinois to pursue a master's degree. As a student, he participated in several campus organizations, including the Asterisk Club, a literary circle, the Menorah Society, a Jewish cultural and literary association, and the Cosmopolitan Club, a multicultural student organization; as head of the University of Missouri Cosmopolitan Club's Jewish group in 1909, he organized a Jewish-themed campus evening featuring musical performances and addresses by faculty members as well as his own talk on Jewish literature.

Marcus Eli Ravage, seated on the right end of the third visible row (not the back row), with fellow students at the Cosmopolitan Club, University of Missouri, 1909

After completing his M.A. at the University of Illinois in 1910 with a thesis on the Yiddish Theater, Ravage undertook graduate studies at Columbia University in New York City. (Note: Recent biographical sources differ on the exact duration of his enrollment at Columbia University. Contemporary university sources identify him as a graduate student there in 1910–1911. A 1926 biographical lexicon states that he "studied Columbia 1910–11, 1912–13"; his daughter Louise Ravage Tresfort also wrote that he "studied at Columbia University intermittently from 1910 to 1913".) During these years, he also worked as an English instructor at Kansas State Agricultural College, (Note: Some sources explicitly date his teaching appointment in Kansas to 1911–1912, while others mention it but are unspecific on its exact duration. Although the institution's name suggests a focus on agriculture and science, its curriculum at the time included humanities.) where he was reportedly "responsible for the local chapter" of the Cosmopolitan Club when students and faculty from a dozen countries founded the college's branch of the organization. Later, he settled in New York City again, where he was actively involved in immigrant-relief and settlement work, an experience that culminated in his writing An American in the Making (1917).

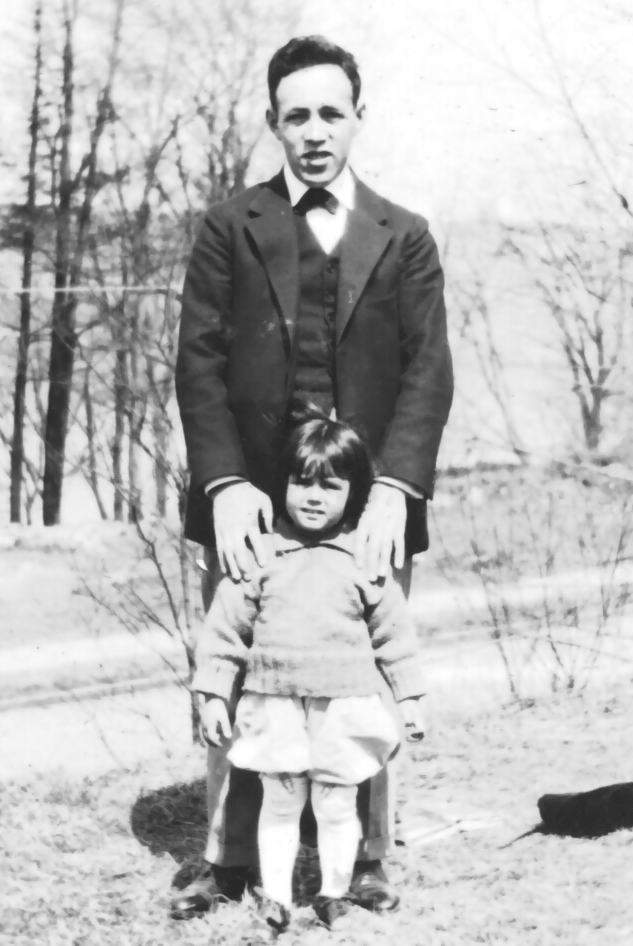
Marcus Eli Ravage with his daughter Suzanne (c. 1921)

In November 1912, Ravage was naturalized as a United States citizen at a courthouse in New York City.

After meeting the Frenchwoman Jeanne Louise Suzanne Martin in Saranac Lake, New York, Ravage married her in 1915. The couple had their first child, Suzanne Anna, in 1916. Two years later, their second child, Louise Belle, was born. In these years, M. E. Ravage established himself as successful magazine writer, journalist and freelance author on social and political issues. He maintained contacts with public figures from literature, (Note: Ravage's literary network at the time included later Pulitzer Prize-winning author Hamlin Garland (1860–1940).) journalism, social reform, and law, and was active as director of the Peoples of America Society, documented by correspondence with human rights activist Lillian D. Wald and investigative journalist Ida Tarbell (1919–1920). (Note: Other members of the Peoples of America Society included Allen T. Burns (Who Was Who entry), Grace Abbott, Jane Addams, George L. Bell, Herbert Croly, Felix Frankfurter (future Supreme Court Justice), Florence Jaffray Harriman, Isaac Aronovich Hourwich, Frederic C. Howe, William Morris Leiserson, Bishop Francis John McConnell, Louis Freeland Post, Reverend John A. Ryan, Lillian D. Wald, and Dorothy Payne Whitney Straight, bringing together figures from feminist social work, labor and civil rights movements, child rights advocacy, housing policy, healthcare, welfare state theory, immigration integration, religious ethics, and legal reform.) Ravage appeared frequently as a public speaker at conferences, community meetings, and civic organizations, lecturing on immigration and social reform as reported in national and local newspapers.

In 1920, the Ravages moved to Paris, France, with Ravage himself travelling across Europe as foreign correspondent, namely to Italy, Austria, Yugoslavia, and Romania, including a visit to his hometown Vaslui for one day. After returning to New York City in 1923, Jeanne and Marcus Eli Ravage welcomed their third child, John Mark, the following year.

Marcus Eli Ravage (c.1960)

1927 marked the family's second move to Paris, undertaken largely for financial reasons. In the following years, Ravage grew increasingly estranged from his family and entered into a relationship with Denise Montel, a publishing contact to whom he dedicated his 1931 biography of Marie Louise. When Jeanne learned of the affair in 1933, she left for Ithaca, New York, taking the children with her; sources differ, with later biographical summaries listing all three children as having left, while Suzanne Ravage's own account states that her sister Louise stayed behind to continue her education. Remaining in France, Ravage eventually divorced Jeanne and married Montel.

Writing both as European correspondent for the U.S. magazine The Nation in this period and for various European magazines and newspapers, among other things Ravage reported from Kemalist Turkey, fascist Italy, as well as Spain during its Civil War, while also interviewing various politicians from Central and Eastern Europe.

After spending most of World War II in the United States, M. E. Ravage returned to France and ultimately settled in Grasse. He died in 1965 at the age of eighty-one after a brief illness.

== Recognition ==
In December 1933, the University of Missouri chapter of Phi Beta Kappa elected Ravage to honorary membership, recognizing his literary achievements and connection to his alma mater.

From 1926 through at least 1941, Ravage was continuously listed in Marquis Who's Who in America, a biographical reference work that aims to document the best known individuals in the United States engaged in useful and reputable achievements. Over the years, his entries were updated to reflect his expanding publication record.

== Reception and distortion ==
=== Legacy in immigration discourse: An American in the Making (1917) ===
Marcus Eli Ravage's literary legacy is anchored in his early contributions to American immigrant literature, particularly through his autobiographical book An American in the Making (1917).

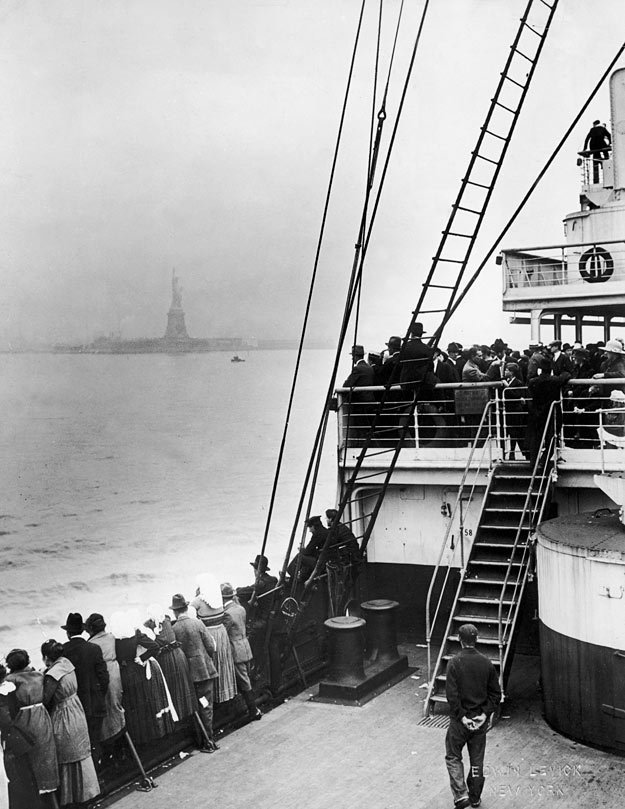
Immigrants approaching Statue of Liberty and Ellis Island (c. 1910s).

Upon publication, An American in the Making became widely used in early 20th-century New York schools and helped establish Ravage as a prominent public figure in the fields of immigration and education policy. (Note: According to a 1919 article in the New York Sun, he was involved in selecting and awarding college scholarships to "promising young men and women of foreign parentage". Drawing on his own return visit to Romania after World War I, Ravage's later articles for the Saturday Evening Post (1923) were cited in U.S. Congressional discussions of immigration reform and received international media attention.)

Ravage's reflections on acculturation in the U.S. resonated with intense public debates about the so-called new immigrants since 1880. Competing ideas about how to incorporate millions of newcomers ranged from Anglo-Saxonism conformity, over the "melting pot" metaphor, to the notions of "hyphenated" Americans and cultural pluralism.

While his work was one of numerous other immigrant autobiographies in the U.S. at that time, it was commended for reflecting lived experience blended with sharp social critique.

The similarly titled autobiographical work The Making of an American (published in 1901 by Danish-American reformer Jacob Riis) was interpreted as an unambiguous celebration of Americanization, popularizing the trope of the self-made assimilated immigrant. Ravage's book, by contrast, exposed the contradictions of Americanization, revealing how immigrants were unrealistically expected to shed their identities, like "a blank sheet to be written on as you see fit", while navigating a society that seldom understood them. Offering a vivid portrayal of his journey from Eastern Europe to the United States, and from the tenements of New York to the rural Midwest, Americanization is presented (as implicated in the title) as a contingent and ongoing process: intense, often disorienting, and at times disappointing.

By asserting that "the alien" has as much to teach as to learn, Ravage challenged prevailing assimilationist models and promoted an early vision of cultural pluralism grounded in reciprocity. Starting from his introduction to the original 1917 edition, Ravage confronted growing hostility towards immigration directly.

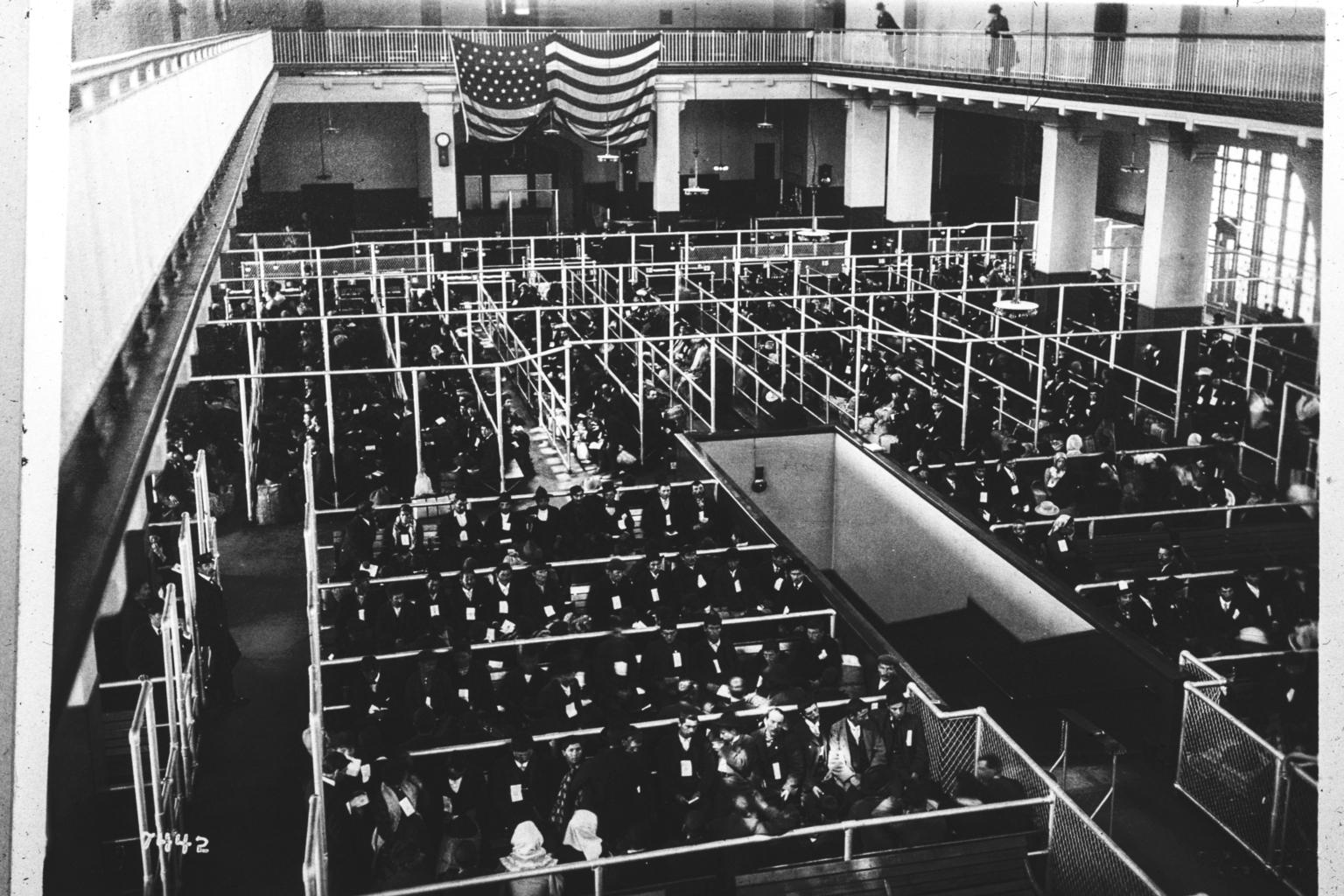
Registry Room for new immigrants at Ellis Island (c. 1910s).

I cannot help saying to myself that Americans have forgotten America. The native, I must conclude, has, by long familiarity with the rich blessings of his own land, grown forgetful of his high privileges and ceased to grasp the lofty message which America wafts across the seas to all the oppressed of mankind. What, I wonder, do they know of America, who know only America? [..] It is the free American who needs to be instructed by the benighted races in the uplifting word that America speaks to all the world. Only from the humble immigrant, it appears to me, can he learn just what America stands for in the family of nations.

— M. E. Ravage, Introduction, An American in the Making (1917)

Consistent with his later publications, (Note: Following the devastations of World War I, Ravage's publicist efforts focused on engaging the American public to extend its democratic promise outward, advocating improved conditions for vulnerable groups, such as Jews who had remained in Europe. See The Jew Pays 1919 and The Malady of Europe 1923.) Ravage underscored the democratic and pluralistic potential of the U.S., while acknowledging the country's flaws. He juxtaposed this promise with the exclusionary ethos of mono-ethnic nationalism, which, as a Romanian Jew, he had witnessed at the turn of the century. (Note: As Dana Mihăilescu observes in her 2021 study of Ravage's writings, "one cannot ignore that America too makes the Jewish immigrant aware of his difference from the others because of a separate background. Still, because of this emigrant's relocation into a society of consent, Ravage highlights the possibility of bridging the gap, in contrast with a descent-based society like Romania, where everything seems to be officially fixed in stable, unchanging patterns.")

Based on both his own personal growth in the Midwest, as well as his critical reflections on immigrant microcosms in New York City, Ravage encouraged fellow immigrants to "go West" and immerse themselves in American life to gain a deeper grasp of its cultural fabric. He advocated the merits of this "rocky road" toward realizing the democratic potential in the immigrant experience. Understanding immigrant identities as "bundles", defined by multiplicity rather than homogeneity, Ravage pursued a conscious "blending" or "commingling" of old- and new-culture elements. This way, Ravage sought to avoid both the pressures of forced assimilation and the risks of ethnic enclave formation within metropolitan settings.

=== Propagandistic abuse since the Nazi era: "A Real Case Against the Jews" & "Commissary to the Gentiles" (1928) ===
==== Original satirical intent of 1928 Century Magazine articles ====
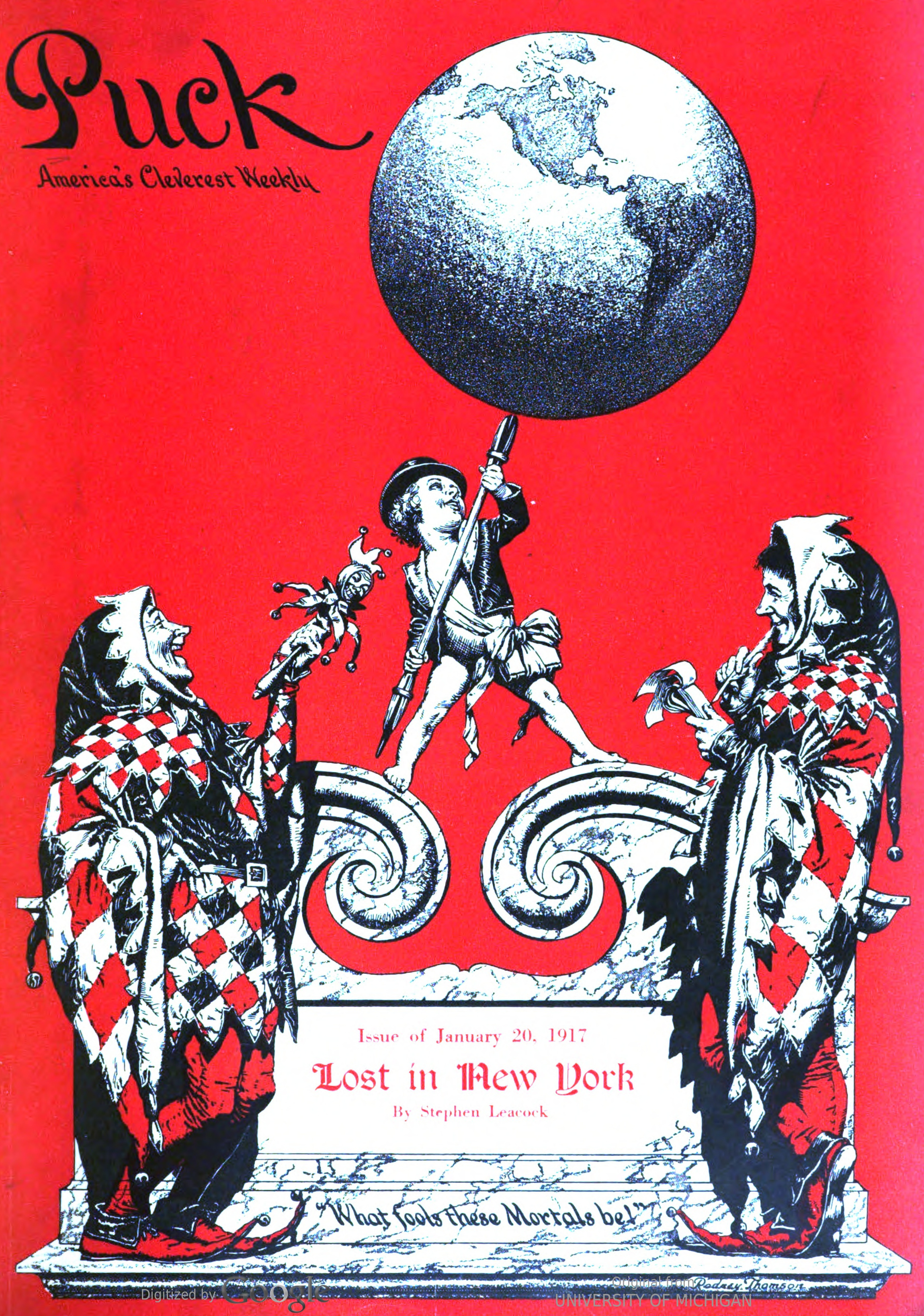
"What fools these mortals be!" (Shakespeare) – Cover of Puck, Jan. 20, 1917; Ravage contributed satirical essays.

Marcus Eli Ravage's essays "A Real Case Against the Jews" and the follow-up "Commissary to the Gentiles", originally published in the January and February 1928 issues of Century Magazine, were written as rhetorical satire to expose antisemitic reasoning. Ravage himself described the two Century essays as written "in an obviously satirical vein", and scholars have interpreted them as parodistic, satirical interventions that use ironic reversal and deliberate overstatement to push antisemitic arguments to absurd extremes. (Note: Attributed to multiple references:)

Ravage's sarcastic style was already well established by the time The Century Magazine published his essays in 1928. His 1917 autobiography, An American in the Making, clearly reflects his ironic sensibility; (Note: Attributed to multiple references:) in addition, he had contributed multiple times to Puck, (Note: Attributed to multiple references:) America's first magazine of political satire, renowned for its bold caricatures and long tradition of humorous commentary. He continued publishing popular essays of self-irony, like How To Make People Hate You! (1927), which drew lighthearted notice in numerous U.S. newspapers. (Note: See: "Ten Most Irritating Things in World Listed by Author". The Hardin News. December 5, 1927. p. 2. "Ten Most Irritating Things in World Listed by Author". Stanberry Herald Headlight. December 8, 1927. p. 2. "Editorial". The Neosho Times. December 8, 1927. p. 2. "Ten Most Irritating Things in World Listed by Author". The Advertiser Courier. December 9, 1927. p. 4. "Ten Most Irritating Things in World Listed by Author". Dunklin County News. December 13, 1927. p. 2. "Ten Most Irritating Things". The Vincennes Commercial. December 13, 1927. p. 4. "Ten Most Irritating Things in World Listed by Author". Bethany Republican Clipper. December 14, 1927. p. 2. "Ten Most Irritating Things in the World". Shelby County Herald. December 14, 1927. p. 7. "Which is Yours?". The Boston Transcript. December 28, 1927. p. 31. "Unpopularity Rules". The Evening Sentinel. April 26, 1928. p. 3. "Author Lists 10 Most Irritating Things in World". San Jose News. August 2, 1928. p. 7. "How To Make People Hate You". McMurry War Whoop. March 19, 1937. p. 2. "Do You Lack Friends? (An Editorial)". The Shamrock Texan. April 2, 1937. p. 3.) The Century Magazine itself had introduced him to its readers in 1917 with the remark: "His youthful ideas of America have been somewhat shattered, but his sense of humor has never deserted him."

The 1928 Century essays are framed as so-called "friendly advice" to contemporary antisemitic writers, particularly targeting the intellectual network around industrialist Henry Ford, whose publishing company Dearborn had recently been sued for releasing a series of antisemitic pamphlets under the title The International Jew.

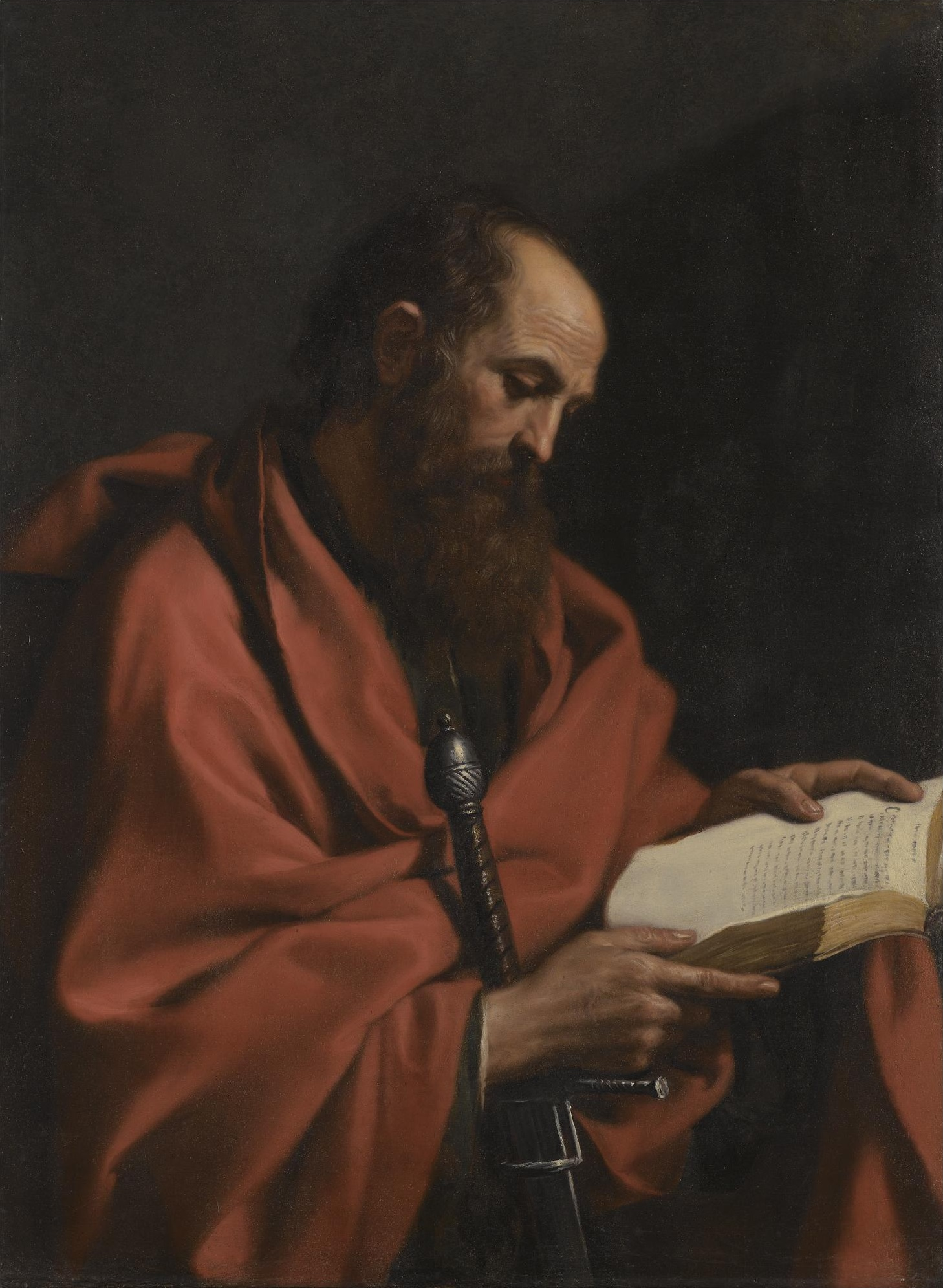
Guercino, "Saint Paul". Ravage's 1928 satire recast Paul the Apostle as a fictional agent of Jewish influence.

Ravage's core argument (according to Kellman 2009 and Berthiaume 2024) consists in highlighting Jewish contributions to Western civilization, especially through Christian religion, to challenge antisemitic tropes. He sarcastically recalls pre-Christianization European religion as an "innocent, care-free pagan race [..] a noble, sensual culture, unirked by the prickings of a social conscience or by any sentimental questionings about human equality". Ravage questions the common explanation of Christian antisemitism as a reaction to Jewish rejection of Jesus, allegations of Jewish deicide, or resistance to conversion to Christianity. Instead, Ravage advances his earlier psychological interpretation of antisemitism from "The Wondering Jew" (an article he had published in Century Magazine 1924), suggesting that Western antisemitism partly reflects unacknowledged resentment toward the Jewish moral and religious legacy embedded in Christianity itself; (Note: Whereas Ravage's 1928 essays develop these themes through overt satire and ironic reversal, William S. Berlin (1979) already notes Ravage's "bitter irony" in the context of his 1924 essay, while interpreting Ravage's emphasis on Jewish moral influence largely in earnest terms, including his idea of "the Jew" as the (asserted) "conscience" of the Western world it would prefer to forget and therefore "subconsciously hates".) – a thesis taken up by Glenn Frank in 1927, and elaborated by Sigmund Freud in Moses and Monotheism (1939).

In "Commissary to the Gentiles", Ravage recasts Paul the Apostle as a covert Jewish agent plotting to overthrow the Roman empire, thereby parodying the modern antisemitic idea of Judeo–Bolshevism (i.e. the idea of communism as a Jewish plot to destroy Western civilisation, citing Jewish heritage of some communists as alleged proof): "Why talk about Marx and Trotski when you have Jesus of Nazareth and Paul of Tarsus to confound us with?"

As summarized by Jonker 1941, Ravage's sarcastic argument suggests that, if antisemitic conspiracy fantasies were to be taken seriously, it would be "more sensible" to accuse Jews of having "undermined" non‑Jewish religion by giving Christianity to the West.

At the same time, the Century essays contain sharp criticism of the contradictory and self‑defeating nature of antisemitic allegations, exposing how, for centuries, Jews have been arbitrarily blamed for social and political evil, even when the accusations are mutually incompatible. Ravage also explicitly dismisses the Protocols of the Elders of Zion as a crude forgery: "A clumsy Russian forges a set of papers and publishes them in a book called 'The Protocols of the Elders of Zion', which shows that we plotted to bring on the late World War."

==== International distortion campaign carried by Nazi Germany c. 1935 onwards ====
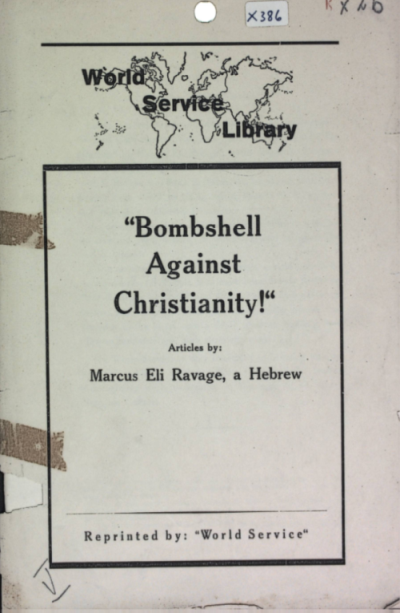
"Bombshell Against Christianity!" (c. 1936) – Cover of unlicensed reprint by Fleischhauer's Welt-Dienst ("World Service"), abusing Ravage's 1928 essays for antisemitic propaganda. (Source: The Wiener Library for the Study of the Nazi Era and the Holocaust, Sourasky Central Library, Tel Aviv University.)

Despite their complex and ironic tone, Ravage's 1928 Century essays have been repeatedly misused by antisemitic and conspiracist groups. Stripped out of context, the ironic reversals have been misrepresented to endorse and affirm the very biases they were meant to critique. Thus, they have become frequent targets for ideological distortion, falsely coloring them as literal "proof" of Jewish world conspiracy. (Note: Attributed to multiple references:)

As Jonker (1941) documented, Ravage's essays were at that time systematically misappropriated by international antisemitic networks, with Nazi Germany serving as the central production and distribution hub for this propaganda, particularly through the Welt-Dienst ("World Service") office based in Erfurt. Conceived by the antisemitic publisher Ulrich Fleischhauer as a "foreign propaganda office" and established in 1933 as a news agency accompanied by a multilanguage publication series of the same title, the Welt-Dienst was regime-backed and institutionally coordinated from inception, yet presented itself as independent to enhance credibility abroad, aiming to foster connections with fascist and antisemitic organizations worldwide and to propagate antisemitic ideas across national borders. The Welt-Dienst series originated as a bimonthly news bulletin and soon expanded to include standalone pamphlets. (Note: See the German Wikipedia article: de:Welt-Dienst)

In 1935, a synchronized rollout of articles in Nazi propaganda outlets – including newspapers as well as magazines – began quote-mining and ideologically reframing Ravage's 1928 Century magazine essays, presenting them as alleged "confessions" of Jewish control over – and hostility toward – Western civilization. In the same year, the far‑right Montreal weekly Le Patriote – whose masthead featured both a swastika and a Christian cross – published distorted Ravage quotations directly referencing the Welt‑Dienst network as source, demonstrating its early transnational reach. By January 1936, in its periodical The Fascist, the British 'Imperial Fascist League' also reproduced portions of Ravage's satire as literal.

A man who cannot see that Ravage writes in an ironical strain, showing the absurdity of the accusations which are burled against the Jews, and takes these words seriously, is not open to any reasoning. One can only pass by with a shrug of the shoulder and regret.

— Moses Gaster, responding to Douglas Dewar, who invoked The Fascist, at a 1936 meeting of the Victoria Institute in London

Initially funded by Joseph Goebbels (and later directed by Alfred Rosenberg), the Welt-Dienst office in 1936 started to print expanded editions of Ravage's 1928 essays, (Note: Attributed to multiple references:) blatantly without the author's or the original publisher's consent, often under sensationalized titles ('Bombshell against Christianity!' etc.), and accompanied by mischaracterizing editorial prefaces and translations that reinforced the ideological framing. (Note: The prefaces to the Welt-Dienst editions of Ravage's essays are ideologically distorting, and also factually inaccurate. For instance, they falsely claim he had five children, mistakenly counting his three children's multiple forenames as separate individuals. The error can be backtraced to a 24 October 1935 intelligence circular by the Deutscher Beobachter in New York and became reprinted by Welt-Dienst without verification.) Numerous editions appeared directly under Fleischhauer's established imprint, i.e. his original pseudonym U. Bodung-Verlag.

During its formative years, Fleischhauer's Welt-Dienst distributed these propagandistic reprints (in parallel with other antisemitic pamphlets) at least in England, France, and Germany. (Note: According to a Berne Trial document titled "Die Aufdeckung einer nationalsozialistischen Agitationszentrale in Mitteleuropa", Welt-Dienst was published in eight languages and was reportedly preparing editions in thirteen, including Hungarian, Polish, Serbian, and Arabic.) Fascist groups outside Europe (including in Australia, Canada, South Africa, and the USA) jumped on the bandwagon and disseminated twisted versions of Ravage's essays. (Note: In Australia, the fascist 'Unity League' reproduced such a pamphlet titled The Sensational Confessions of Marcus Eli Ravage (A Hebrew) against Christianity, described by historians as an inflammatory piece in the long tradition of antisemitic polemics.) (Note: Canadian fascist Adrien Arcand distributed his French pamphlet La clé du mystère from 1937 onwards, which systematically misquoted and distorted Ravage among other Jewish writers in an attempt to validate antisemitic conspirational beliefs. In 1939, South African Nazi sympathiser Manie Maritz reproduced portions of La clé du mystère, translated into Afrikaans, within his autobiography, including the Ravage misquotations: Maritz (1939). My Lewe en Strewe. pp. 183–185.) (Note: The Erfurt-based American section of Welt-Dienst supplied the pamphlet Bombshell against Christianity directly to "native fascist" groups in the United States, including the 'German American Bund', the most influential Nazi organization in the USA at that time (est. Mar 1936, dis. Dec 1941); which further distributed that pamphlet domestically, where it was sold in specialized antisemitic bookstores such as in Los Angeles, California, until the U.S. entered World War II in December 1941, or shortly thereafter.) (Note: Based in Chicago, Illinois (USA), the antisemitic organization 'Right Cause' issued a pamphlet that combined different propagandistically manipulated text corpora by Jewish authors: a distorted presentation of Ravage's 1928 essays; and a tendentious translation of a German-language article by Jewish Party of Romania activist Manfred Reifer, originally published in the Czernowitzer Allgemeine Zeitung, 3. September 1933, p. 10. The Chicago pamphlet's umbrella title appears to falsely attribute rabbinic status to Reifer and/or Ravage.) Under Alfred Rosenberg's direction after 1937, and fully relocated to Frankfurt am Main in 1939 (tied to his newly founded Institute for Research on the Jewish Question), the Welt-Dienst office generally expanded its output to at least 11 languages by 1940 including Hungarian, Polish, Danish, Spanish, Dutch, Romanian, Norwegian and Swedish, with further growth in subsequent years reportedly reaching over 20 languages including Arabic, Russian, Latvian, Italian, Spanish, Croatian, Bulgarian, Serbian and Greek. (Note: Another key actor in Nazi foreign propaganda was the Deutscher Fichte-Bund in Hamburg, which used similar methods and audiences as Welt‑Dienst, shipping comparable multilingual pamphlets internationally.)

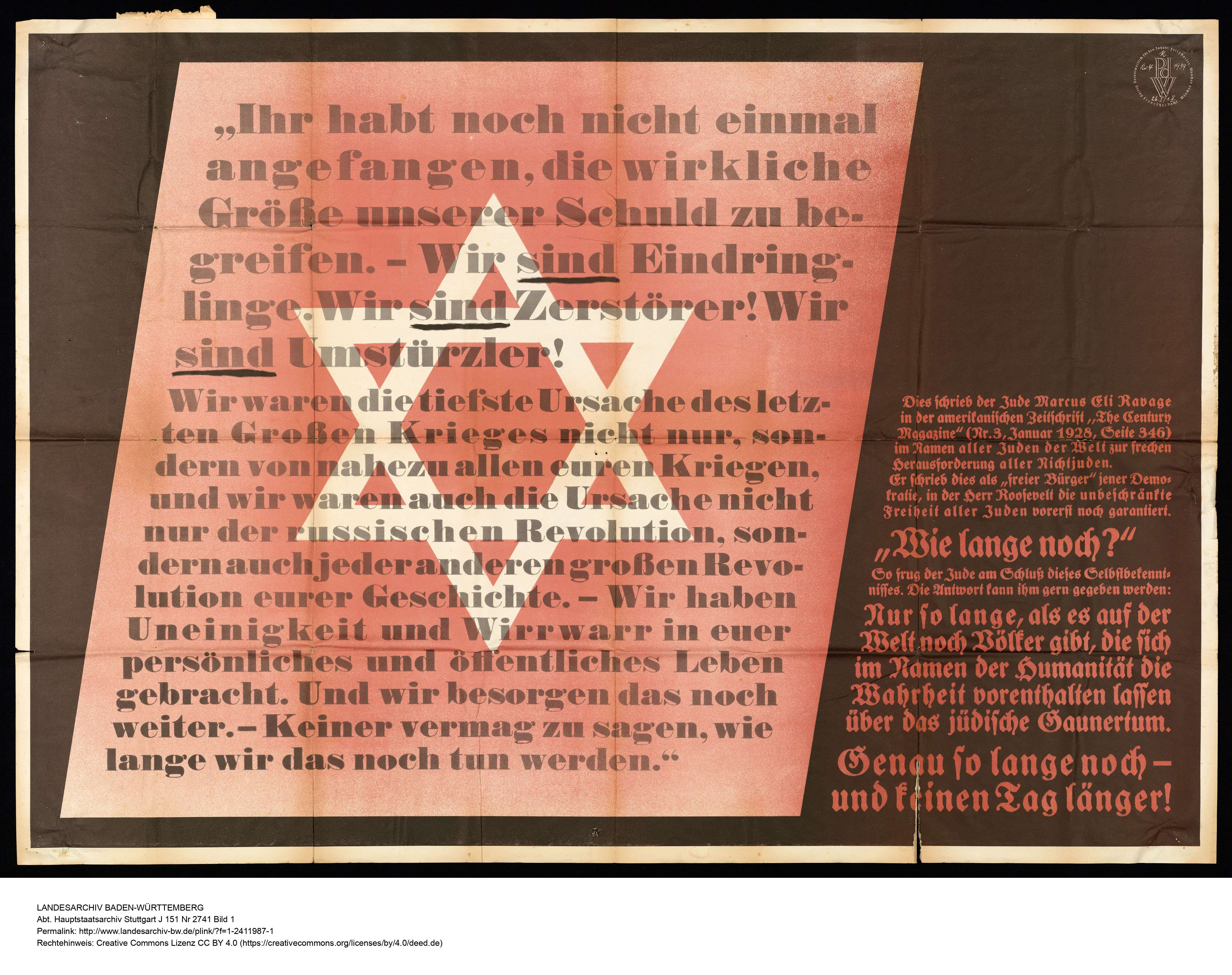
Antisemitic Nazi propaganda placard from the Parole der Woche series, quote-mining Marcus Eli Ravage (1939).

Though archival holdings of such prints remain largely elusive, (Note: Among the numerous later propagandistic Ravage translations that extended beyond the initial German, French, and English editions, documented examples include Czech, Dutch, Hungarian and Polish prints. They circulated in various nationalist and antisemitic milieus during the late 1930s and early 1940s.) Welt-Dienst verifiably escalated its propaganda following Nazi Germany's invasion of Poland in September 1939, aiming to shift blame for World War II onto Jews. According to contemporary news reports, the strategy in the United States combined selective misquotation of Marcus Eli Ravage's writings in the World-Service Bulletin (1 October 1939; 1 February 1940) with the intensified distribution of full Century essays reprints, the latter issued with antisemitic cover imagery and a reverse-side blurb featuring the forged Franklin "prophecy on Jews"; Ravage subsequently announced plans to pursue legal action against pro-Nazi groups in the United States. (Note: Attributed to multiple references:) By 1940 at the latest, the NSDAP's Central Publishing House, controlling several publishing houses in the occupied territories through its subsidiary Europa Verlag GmbH, also distributed propaganda versions of the Ravage essays.

Individual passages and quotations from Ravage's Century articles were repeatedly used in broader Nazi and pro-Nazi propaganda efforts, such as Parole der Woche, Völkischer Beobachter, Der Stürmer, and the Vichy France exhibition guide Le Juif et la France by Jean Marquès-Rivière.

The unauthorized reprints are now cited by scholars as examples of ideological appropriation of Ravage's writings by antisemitic propagandists.

Even after the defeat of Nazi Germany in 1945, antisemitic groups continued to treat Ravage's 1928 essays as literal 'self-incrimination', periodically quote-mining them in conspiracist, far-right, Islamist (Note: David Musa Pidcock, founder of the Islamic Party of Britain, also published Islamist‑fundamentalist tracts such as Satanic Voices, Ancient and Modern (1992), incorporating ideological misreadings of Ravage's 1928 essays into antisemitic conspiracy narratives.) and white‑supremacist publications; today, such misappropriations are amplified in antisemitic online spaces. (Note: Archive.org hosts a 2018 re-edition of Ravage's essays, containing a misattributed photograph as well as a newly added editorial note which promotes antisemitic conspiracy claims and incites racial violence; the item is cited here to document the persistent misrepresentation of Ravage and his work.)

=== Visual misrepresentation in digital media ===
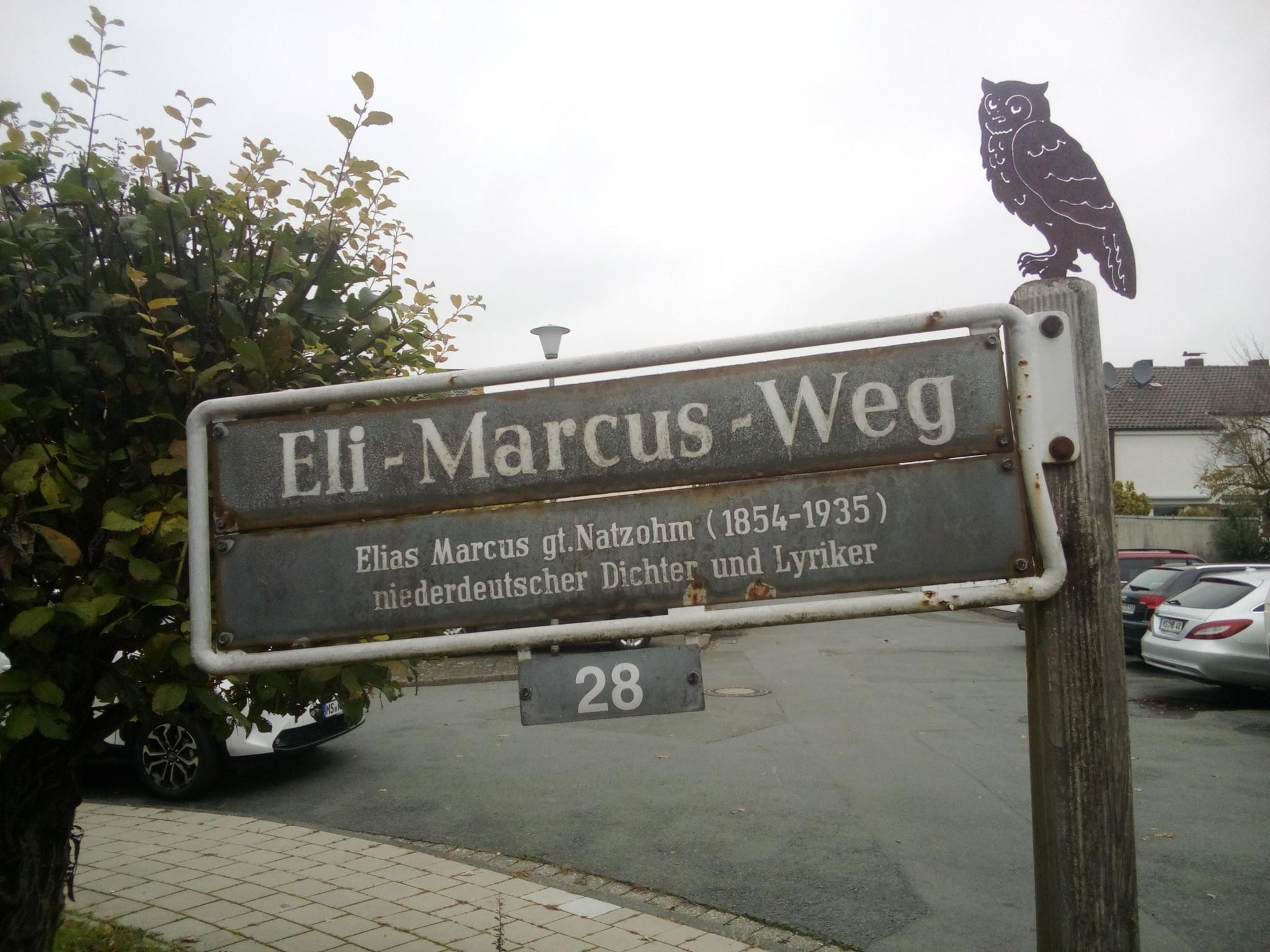
Eli-Marcus-Weg in Münster (Germany) is unconnected to American essayist Marcus Eli Ravage (1884–1965). The street was named in 1961 to honor German poet Eli Marcus (1854–1935), whose portrait, however, has been misused by antisemitic websites to depict Ravage.

Though authentic portraits of Marcus Eli Ravage are attested in publications both contemporaneous and recent, such as the 1909 University of Missouri student yearbook as well as Deborah Hopkinson's scholastic history book Shutting Out the Sky (2003), he has repeatedly been visually misrepresented in online contexts throughout the 2010s and 2020s. As documented by the Dorsten-located Jewish Museum of Westphalia, antisemitic and conspiracy‑ideological websites circulate a historical portrait of the unrelated German Westphalian actor and dialect poet Eli Marcus (1854–1935) and misidentify it as a depiction of M. E. Ravage.

Historically, the first documented publication of this portrait was 1914 in the book Geschichte der Westfälischen Dialektliteratur, where it is correctly captioned as depicting the German playwright E. Marcus; since then, the portrait has been consistently attributed to E. Marcus in recent scholarship as well. Nevertheless, since at least 2013, it has been repeatedly misused in antisemitic circles as an alleged image of M. E. Ravage. This misrepresentation briefly spread to Wikipedia in 2025, where it was subsequently corrected. The persistent use of the incorrect image in antisemitic contexts, where Ravage's writings are selectively quoted or distorted, reflects a lack of source scrutiny in such circles.

== Works ==
=== Monographs ===
- M. E. Ravage (1917). An American in the Making: The Life Story of an Immigrant (1st ed.). New York and London: Harper & Brothers – via Library of Congress.
  Reviewed as:
  B. I. Bell (May 4, 1918). "An Immigrant's Biography: Review of 'An American in the Making'". The Public: A Journal of Democracy. 21 (1031): 576–577. hdl:2027/chi.79230421.
  R. E. Park (1918). "Review of: 'An American in the Making: The Life Story of an Immigrant', by M. E. Ravage". American Journal of Sociology. 23 (6): 839–840. doi:10.1086/212834.
  A. Shaw (May 4, 1917). "Review of: 'An American in the Making'". The American Review of Reviews. 56 (Jan–Jun): 664. hdl:2027/mdp.39015027769523.
- M. E. Ravage (1919). Democratic Americanization: A Criticism and a Policy. [Reprint of a series of essays in The New Republic: Standardizing the Immigrant (May 31, 1919), The Immigrant's Burden (June 14, 1919), The Task for Americans (July 16, 1919)]. The Peoples of America Society – via Princeton Theological Seminary#Libraries Wright Library.
- M. E. Ravage (1919). The Jew Pays: A Narrative of the Consequences of the War to the Jews of Eastern Europe, and of the Manner in Which Americans Have Attempted to Meet Them. New York: Alfred A. Knopf – via Library of Congress.
  Reviewed as:
  M. J. H. (November 29, 1919). "Book Review: 'The Jew Pays'". The Reform Advocate. 58. Chicago, Illinois: Block & Newman: 393–394. hdl:2027/mdp.39015082355408.
  M. Massee, ed. (January 1920). "Ravage, Marcus Eli: The Jew Pays (Review)". The Booklist. 16 (4). Chicago: American Library Association Publishing Board: 111. hdl:2027/hvd.hxtdcy.
- M. E. Ravage (1923). The Malady of Europe. New York: Macmillan – via Internet Archive.
  Reviewed as:
  W. A. White (October 31, 1923). "Review of 'The Malady of Europe'". The New Republic. Vol. 36, no. 465. pp. 260–262 – via Internet Archive.
  L. S. Gannett (January 1924). "A Challenging Diagnosis (Review of 'The Malady of Europe')". The World Tomorrow: 21. hdl:2027/njp.32101072882515.
  "Maladies of Europe and an Original Remedy; Review of 'The Malady of Europe' By M. E. Ravage". New York Times. November 18, 1923.
- M. E. Ravage (1924). The Story of the Teapot Dome. New York: Republic Publishing Co. hdl:2027/uc1.$b284789.
- M. E. Ravage (1929). Five Men of Frankfort: The Story of the Rothschilds. New York: The Dial press – via Internet Archive.
  Translated into Czech as: Pět mužů z Frankfurtu – Historie Rothschildů. Translated by H. Pavelcová. Praha: Jos. R. Vilímek. 1931.
  Translated into Dutch as: Opkomst en bloei van het huis Rothschild. Amsterdam: Allert de Lange. 1930. OCLC 187965.
  Translated into French as: Grandeur et décadence de la Maison Rothschild. Translated by André T. Naijon. Paris: Albin Michel. 1931.
  Translated into German as: Glanz und Niedergang des Hauses Rothschild. Translated by Wilhelm Cremer. Hellerau: Avalun-Verlag. 1930. (Note: The German translation of this book was also serialized in numerous installments in the Viennese tabloid newspaper Die Stunde in the early 1930s.)
  Translated into Spanish as: Grandeza y decadencia de la casa de los Rothschild: Cinco hombres de Francfort. (La historia de los Rothschild). Translated by G. Sans Huelín. Madrid: Espasa-Calpe S.A. 1931.
  Translated into Yiddish as: Di finf Frankfurṭer: gešichṭe fun der familie Roṭšild (די פינף פראנקפורטער – די געשיכטע פון דער פאמיליע ראטשילד). Translated by Y. Glazer (י' גלאזער). Buenos Aires (בוענאס איירעס): G. Ḳaplansḳi (פארלאג ג. קאפלאנסקי). 1932. LCCN 74951137. OCLC 165481302.
  Reviewed as:
  W. Lichtenstein (1929). "Review of .. 'Five Men of Frankfort: The Story of the Rothschilds', by M. E. Ravage". The Journal of Modern History. 1 (3). University of Chicago Press: 486–488. JSTOR 1871448.
- M. E. Ravage (1931). Empress Innocence: The Life of Marie-Louise. New York: Alfred A. Knopf – via Internet Archive.
  Translated into French as: Iphigenie ou La Vie de Marie Louise. Translated by Jean Talva. Paris: Albin Michel. 1932.
  Translated into Spanish as: La vida de María Luisa, la emperatriz inocente. Vidas extraordinaires. Translated by Julio Huici Miranda. Madrid: Espasa-Calpe S.A. 1932.
  Reviewed as:
  J. Hallett (June 1932). "Review of: 'Empress Innocence', by M. E. Ravage". Fortnightly Review, May 1865-June 1934. 21: 799–801. ISSN 2043-2887. ProQuest 2453778.
- M. E. Ravage (1936) [1917]. An American in the Making: The Life Story of an Immigrant (With newly added Pt. V, 'Postscript: Twenty Years Later.') (2nd ed.). Harper Modern Classics.
- M. E. Ravage (1971) [1917]. An American in the Making: The Life Story of an Immigrant (With preface by the author's daughter, Louise Ravage Tresfort) (3rd ed.). Dover Publications. ISBN 0-486-22013-3. LCCN 73125869 – via Internet Archive.
- M. E. Ravage (2009) [1917]. Kellman, Steven G. (ed.). An American in the Making: The Life Story of an Immigrant (With a new scholarly introduction by the editor, plus chronological notes) (4th ed.). Rutgers University Press. ISBN 978-0-8135-4537-0. JSTOR j.ctt5hhx2m.

=== Selected articles in periodicals ===
==== Puck ====
- M. E. Ravage (January 20, 1917). "I Laugh As I Think". Puck (America's Cleverest Weekly). Vol. 81. p. 16. hdl:2027/mdp.39015082471429.
- M. E. Ravage (February 10, 1917). "The Fable of the Cipher". Puck (America's Cleverest Weekly). Vol. 81. p. 19. hdl:2027/mdp.39015082471429.
- M. E. Ravage (March 17, 1917). "A Preface To a Novel". Puck (America's Cleverest Weekly). Vol. 81. p. 20. hdl:2027/mdp.39015082471429.

==== New York Times ====
- M. E. Ravage (November 4, 1917). "A Clue to Hillquit". The New York Times.
- M. E. Ravage (March 30, 1919). "To Educate Foreign Colonies Out of Existence: An Americanized Writer Suggests the College in a Small Town as the Best Medium for Assimilating Aliens and Would Make National Fund a Roosevelt Memorial". The New York Times Magazine (Sunday supplement to The New York Times). pp. 7, 14.

==== Harper's ====
- M. E. Ravage (February 1917). "The Prophet from America". Harper's Magazine. Vol. 134. pp. 388–395. hdl:2027/uc1.31210015290578.
- M. E. Ravage (March 1917). "To America on Foot". Harper's Magazine. Vol. 134. pp. 479–486. hdl:2027/uc1.31210015290578.
- M. E. Ravage (April 1917). "My Plunge into the Slums". Harper's Magazine. Vol. 134. pp. 658–665. hdl:2027/uc1.31210015290578.
- M. E. Ravage (May 1917). "Immigrant's Luck". Harper's Magazine. Vol. 134. pp. 837–848. hdl:2027/uc1.31210015290578.
- M. E. Ravage (June 1917). "An American in the Making". Harper's Magazine. Vol. 135, no. 805. pp. 111–125. hdl:2027/mdp.39015056097465.
- M. E. Ravage (April 1936). "The French Volcano". Harper's Magazine. Vol. 172. pp. 592–601.

==== The Century Magazine ====
- M. E. Ravage (June 1917). "The Loyalty of the Foreign Born: An Interpretation". The Century Magazine. Vol. 94. Introduction by James Harvey Robinson. pp. 201–209. hdl:2027/uc1.b2922265.
- M. E. Ravage (November 1917). "Absorbing the Alien". The Century Magazine. Vol. 95. pp. 26–36. hdl:2027/uiug.30112001586285.
- M. E. Ravage (January 1918). "The Tired College Man". The Century Magazine. Vol. 95. pp. 376–384. hdl:2027/uiug.30112001586285.
- M. E. Ravage (February 1918). "The Religion of Sanity". The Century Magazine. Vol. 95. pp. 516–522. hdl:2027/uiug.30112001586285.
- M. E. Ravage (March 1923). "Picnicking on Perilous: The Human Meaning of the Exchange Problem". The Century Magazine. Vol. 105. pp. 737–746. hdl:2027/osu.32435051457083.
- M. E. Ravage (February 1924). "The Wondering Jew: Reflections on the Paradoxes of Anti-Semitism". The Century Magazine. Vol. 107. pp. 552–564. hdl:2027/uc1.b2922278.
- M. E. Ravage (January 1928). "A Real Case Against the Jews. One of Them Points Out the Full Depth of Their Guilt". The Century Magazine. Vol. 115, no. 3. pp. 346–350. hdl:2027/uc1.b2922286.
- M. E. Ravage (February 1928). "Commissary to the Gentiles: The First to See the Possibilities of War by Propaganda". The Century Magazine. Vol. 115, no. 4. pp. 476–483. hdl:2027/uc1.b2922286.

==== The New Republic ====
- M. E. Ravage (December 28, 1918). "The Temper of Jewry". The New Republic. pp. 242–244. hdl:2027/hvd.hxqfnx.
- M. E. Ravage (May 31, 1919). "Standardizing the Immigrant". The New Republic. pp. 145–147. hdl:2027/hvd.hxqfni.
- M. E. Ravage (June 14, 1919). "The Immigrant's Burden". The New Republic. pp. 209–211. hdl:2027/hvd.hxqfni.
- M. E. Ravage (July 16, 1919). "The Task for Americans". The New Republic. pp. 349–351. hdl:2027/hvd.hxqfni.
- M. E. Ravage (March 2, 1921). "Latter Day Nomads". The New Republic. pp. 10–12. hdl:2027/uva.x000855235.
- M. E. Ravage (June 22, 1921). "New Countries for Old". The New Republic. pp. 108–110. hdl:2027/uva.x000460670.
- M. E. Ravage (August 13, 1924). "A Pluralistic America. (Review of: 'Culture and Democracy in America: Studies in the Group Psychology of the American Peoples', by Horace M. Kallen)". The New Republic. Vol. 39, no. 506. pp. 334–335 – via Internet Archive.
- M. E. Ravage (November 16, 1927). "The Subversive Galilean (Review of 'Why Rome Fell', by Edward Lucas White)". The New Republic. Vol. 52, no. 676. p. 343 – via Internet Archive.
- M. E. Ravage (November 18, 1936). "The French in Indo-China". The New Republic. Vol. 89, no. 1146. pp. 82–83.
- M. E. Ravage (December 9, 1936). "Hopeful Catalonia". The New Republic. Vol. 89, no. 1149. pp. 171–173.
- M. E. Ravage (February 3, 1937). "In Catalonia". The New Republic. Vol. 89, no. 1157. pp. 401–402.

==== The Nation and Athenaeum (London) ====
- M. E. Ravage (1921). "Derelicts". The Nation. Vol. 28. London. pp. 809–810. hdl:2027/coo.31924007313368. OCLC 715567055.
- M. E. Ravage (December 31, 1921). "Lost patience of Vienna". The Nation. Vol. 30, no. 14. London. pp. 524–525. hdl:2027/coo.31924065574992 – via Internet Archive.
- M. E. Ravage (January 14, 1922). "Lost patience of Vienna (II)". The Nation. Vol. 30, no. 16. London. pp. 581–583 – via Internet Archive.

==== The Minneapolis Tribune ====
- M. E. Ravage (June 5, 1921). "Vienna Called World's Fair of Old Clothes: People Wear Suits Bought Before World War, Says Writer. Low Rate of Exchange Is Cause of Business Depression, Merchants Claim. (Special to Universal Services.)". The Minneapolis Sunday Tribune. Minneapolis. p. 23.

==== The Saturday Evening Post ====
- M. E. Ravage (March 17, 1923). "Our Sentimental Pilgrimage". The Saturday Evening Post. 195 (38): 3–4, 120. hdl:2027/mdp.39015016748017 – via Internet Archive.
- M. E. Ravage (March 24, 1923). "Our Sentimental Pilgrimage: The Return of the Native". The Saturday Evening Post. 195 (39): 8–9, 129–130, 133. hdl:2027/mdp.39015016748017 – via Internet Archive.
- M. E. Ravage (September 15, 1923). "America Goes A-Marketing". The Saturday Evening Post. 196 (11): 3–4, 189–190, 192–194 – via Internet Archive.
- M. E. Ravage (December 8, 1923). "Immigrants of Tomorrow". The Saturday Evening Post. 196 (23): 18, 148, 153–154, 156–157, 161–162 – via Internet Archive.
- M. E. Ravage (April 12, 1924). "About Foreigners and Food". The Saturday Evening Post. 196 (41): 21, 117 – via Internet Archive.

==== The Elks Magazine ====
- M. E. Ravage (March 1925). "The Paradise of Tourists. You Can Do Much for Little, Abroad – And Much Can Be Done to You" (PDF). The Elks. New York City: Benevolent and Protective Order of Elks. pp. 12–15, 69–72 – via Wikimedia Commons.
- M. E. Ravage (October 1925). "Where Is the Culture of America? The Cities Claim It – But Do They Monopolize It?" (PDF). The Elks. New York City: Benevolent and Protective Order of Elks. pp. 20–21, 71–77 – via Wikimedia Commons.

==== Hearst's International Combined with Cosmopolitan ====
- M. E. Ravage (July 1926). "What Happens in Real Life to Abie's Irish Rose". Cosmopolitan. Vol. 81. pp. 40–41. hdl:2027/mdp.39015010959628.

==== The Saturday Review ====
- M. E. Ravage (May 21, 1927). "A Personal Record (Review of: 'An American Saga', by Carl Christian Jensen)". The Saturday Review. 3 (43): 843 – via Internet Archive.

==== The American ====
- M. E. Ravage (June 1927). "My Wife Won't Let Me Be A Gypsy". American Magazine. Vol. 103. New York: Colver. pp. 47, 203–205. hdl:2027/iau.31858029197658.
- M. E. Ravage (December 1927). "How To Make People Hate You! (I know that these recipees for unpopularity work because I have tried them all)". American Magazine. Vol. 104. New York: Colver. pp. 14–15, 152–156. hdl:2027/mdp.39015007038238. OCLC 6403725.

==== Le Petit Parisien: journal quotidien du soir (Paris) ====
- M.-E. Ravage (October 4, 1933). "Comment un Américain découvre l'Amérique. Les États-Unis après six ans d'absence". Le Petit Parisien (in French). Vol. 58, no. 20672. pp. 1, 4 – via Bibliothèque nationale de France.
- M.-E. Ravage (October 6, 1933). "Ce qu'est la crise américaine. (Après six ans d'absence)". Le Petit Parisien (in French). Vol. 58, no. 20674. pp. 1–2 – via Bibliothèque nationale de France.
- M.-E. Ravage (October 15, 1933). "La fin du puritanisme aux États-Unis". Le Petit Parisien (in French). Vol. 58, no. 20683. pp. 1–2 – via Bibliothèque nationale de France.
- M.-E. Ravage (October 31, 1933). "Pourquoi le dollar a abandonné l'étalon-or. (Après six ans d'absence)". Le Petit Parisien (in French). Vol. 58, no. 20699. pp. 1, 5 – via Bibliothèque nationale de France.
- M.-E. Ravage (November 20, 1933). "N.R.A.: La loi du redressement national. (Après six ans d'absence)". Le Petit Parisien (in French). Vol. 58, no. 20719. pp. 1–2 – via Bibliothèque nationale de France.
- M.-E. Ravage (November 28, 1933). "Le racisme à l'Américaine. (Après six ans d'absence)". Le Petit Parisien (in French). Vol. 58, no. 20727. p. 5 – via Bibliothèque nationale de France.
- M.-E. Ravage (December 5, 1933). "La politique et l'économie aux États-Unis". Le Petit Parisien (in French). Vol. 58, no. 20734. p. 6 – via Bibliothèque nationale de France.

==== Vu: journal de la semaine (Paris) ====
- M.-E. Ravage (September 27, 1933). "Les États-Unis font leur révolution". Vu (in French). No. 289. pp. 1493–1495 – via Bibliothèque nationale de France.
- M.-E. Ravage (April 11, 1934). "L'écroulement de la légende américaine". Vu (in French). No. 317. p. 476 – via Bibliothèque nationale de France.
- M.-É. Ravage (February 27, 1935). "Un nationalisme sans impérialisme". Vu (in French). No. 363. pp. 258–259 – via Bibliothèque nationale de France.
- M.-E. Ravage (October 2, 1935). "La lutte pour le pouvoir. Dialogue au Troisième Reich". Vu (in French). Vol. 8, no. 394. pp. 1291–1292 – via Bibliothèque nationale de France.

==== Neues Wiener Tagblatt: Demokratisches Organ (Vienna) ====
- M. E. Ravage (August 17, 1934). "Amerikanische Wirtschaft". Neues Wiener Tagblatt (in German). Vol. 68, no. 225 (24602). Vienna. pp. 1–2 – via Austrian National Library.
- M. E. Ravage (August 23, 1934). "Planwirtschaft in Amerika". Neues Wiener Tagblatt (in German). Vol. 68, no. 231 (24608). Vienna. pp. 1–2 – via Austrian National Library.
- M. E. Ravage (September 26, 1934). "Roosevelts drei Kabinette". Neues Wiener Tagblatt (in German). Vol. 68, no. 265 (24642). Vienna. pp. 1–2 – via Austrian National Library.

==== Current History (New York/Oakland) ====
- M. E. Ravage (November 1935). "Italy Doubts Mussolini". Current History. 43 (2): 113–118. doi:10.1525/curh.1935.43.2.113. ISSN 0011-3530. JSTOR 45337590.
- M. E. Ravage (November 1936). "'Mr. WoolWorth' Comes to Paris". Current History. 45 (2): 97–100. doi:10.1525/curh.1936.45.2.97. ISSN 0011-3530. JSTOR 45337750.

==== Vendredi: hebdomadaire littéraire, politique et satirique (Paris) ====
- M.-E. Ravage (May 15, 1936). "Le Front populaire vu d'Amérique". Vendredi (in French). No. 28. p. 4 – via Bibliothèque nationale de France.

==== Ce soir: grand quotidien d'information indépendant (Paris) ====
- M. E. Ravage (March 31, 1937). "M. Kamil Krofta, ministre des Affaires étrangères de Tchécoslovaquie, déclare à 'Ce soir'..." Ce soir. p. 9. ISSN 2425-1445 – via Bibliothèque nationale de France.
- M. E. Ravage (April 27, 1937). "Le roi Carol fait à 'Ce soir' d'importantes déclarations". Ce soir. p. 3 – via Bibliothèque nationale de France.
- M. E. Ravage (April 30, 1937). "'Ce soir' a interviewé M. Antonesco, ministre des Affaires étrangères de Roumanie". Ce soir. p. 3 – via Bibliothèque nationale de France.
- M. E. Ravage (May 5, 1937). "'Ce soir' en Roumanie: Avec le chef de la garde de fer". Ce soir. p. 3 – via Bibliothèque nationale de France.
- M. E. Ravage (May 15, 1937). "'Ce soir' en Roumanie: La Petite-Entente reste la base de notre politique extérieure". Ce soir. p. 9 – via Bibliothèque nationale de France.
- M. E. Ravage (May 17, 1937). "'Ce soir' en Roumanie: M. Jorga, ancien président du Conseil, nous dit ..." Ce soir. p. 9 – via Bibliothèque nationale de France.

==== Das Echo (Vienna) ====
- M. E. Ravage (May 18, 1937). "Interview mit Tibor Eckhardt: ′Autarkie bedeutet Selbstmord′". Das Echo. Vol. 4, no. 112. Vienna. p. 2 – via Austrian National Library.

==== Nation Magazine (New York) ====
- M. E. Ravage (March 18, 1936). "The Decline of French Fascism". The Nation. Vol. 142 (36-1), no. 3689. New York. pp. 347–348. ISSN 0027-8378. OCLC 1643268 – via Internet Archive.
- M. E. Ravage (April 1, 1936). "Hitler Stiffens the French Right [indexed as: 'Hitler Strengthens the French Right']". The Nation. Vol. 142 (36-1), no. 3691. New York. pp. 408–410 – via Internet Archive.
- M. E. Ravage (April 29, 1936). "France Votes for the Future". The Nation. Vol. 142 (36-1), no. 3695. New York. p. 549 – via Internet Archive.
- M. E. Ravage (May 6, 1936). "A French Left Victory". The Nation. Vol. 142 (36-1), no. 3696. New York. pp. 573–574 – via Internet Archive.
- M. E. Ravage (June 3, 1936). "The French Socialists in Power". The Nation. Vol. 142 (36-1), no. 3700. New York. pp. 706–707 – via Internet Archive.
- M. E. Ravage (June 17, 1936). "France on Strike". The Nation. Vol. 142 (36-1), no. 3702. New York. p. 765 – via Internet Archive.
- M. E. Ravage (August 8, 1936). "The Blum Government – Second Phase". The Nation. Vol. 143 (36-2), no. 6. New York. pp. 155–156 – via Internet Archive.
- M. E. Ravage (September 12, 1936). "Doriot – France's Would-Be Fuhrer". The Nation. Vol. 143 (36-2), no. 11. New York. p. 299 – via Internet Archive.
- M. E. Ravage (November 7, 1936). "Reaction Rises in France". The Nation. Vol. 143 (36-2), no. 19. New York. pp. 544–545 – via Internet Archive.
- M. E. Ravage (January 9, 1937). "Blum and the Communists". The Nation. Vol. 144 (37-1), no. 2. New York. pp. 41–43 – via Internet Archive.
- M. E. Ravage (February 20, 1937). "What Good is Revolution? (Review: 'Return from the USSR', by André P. G. Gide)". The Nation. Vol. 144 (37-1), no. 8. New York. pp. 210–211 – via Internet Archive.
- M. E. Ravage (July 17, 1937). "After Chautemps, What?". The Nation. Vol. 145 (37-2), no. 3. New York. pp. 71–73 – via Internet Archive.
- M. E. Ravage (August 28, 1937). "Panic on the Danube". The Nation. Vol. 145 (37-2), no. 9. New York. pp. 215–217 – via Internet Archive.
- M. E. Ravage (September 11, 1937). "Toward a Bigger Little Entente". The Nation. Vol. 145 (37-2), no. 11. New York. pp. 258–260 – via Internet Archive.
- M. E. Ravage (November 27, 1937). "What Next in France?". The Nation. Vol. 145 (37-2), no. 22. New York. pp. 580–582 – via Internet Archive.
- M. E. Ravage (December 25, 1937). "Il Duce, Tool of Hitler". The Nation. Vol. 145 (37-2), no. 26. New York. pp. 713–714 – via Internet Archive.
- M. E. Ravage (January 22, 1938). "France in Crisis". The Nation. Vol. 146 (38-1), no. 4. New York. p. 90 – via Internet Archive.
- M. E. Ravage (February 5, 1938). "Why France Has No Dictator". The Nation. Vol. 146 (38-1), no. 6. New York. pp. 152–154 – via Internet Archive.

=== Articles in anthologies ===
- M. E. Ravage (1920), "The Loyality of the Foreign Born. (An extract from an article published under this title in the Century Magazine for June, 1917)", in Paul Monroe; Irving E. Miller (eds.), The American Spirit. A Basis For World Democracy, New York: World Book Company, pp. 209–217 – via Internet Archive
- M. E. Ravage (1922), "The New Immigration; and: What College Life in the West did for An Immigrant", in Stauffer, Robert E. (ed.), The American Spirit in the Writings of Americans of Foreign Birth, The Christopher publishing house, pp. 150–159 – via Internet Archive
- M. E. Ravage (1922), "The American People as a Whole", in Samuel Walker McCall; Charles W. Eliot (eds.), Patriotism of the American Jew, New York: Plymoth Press, pp. 274–289 – via Internet Archive
- M. E. Ravage (1924), "The American People as a Whole", in Samuel Walker McCall; Charles W. Eliot (eds.), Patriotism of the American Jew, New York: Plymoth Press, pp. 279–288, hdl:2027/uc1.$b309248 (slightly revised version)
- M.-E. Ravage (June 1934), "Les pleins pouvoirs de Roosevelt", in Valery, Paul; Drach, Frédéric (eds.), Dictatures et dictateurs, Témoignages de notre temps n°7 (in French), Société anonyme Les Illustres Français, pp. 75–81

=== Unpublished academic papers ===
- M. Ravitch (c. 1909), The Asterisks (ed.), (Unknown title; a literary criticism of Edgar Allan Poe) (pamphlet), University of Missouri
- M. Ravitch (1909), (Unknown title; an essay on John Greenleaf Whittier), University of Missouri
- M. Ravitch (1910). The Yiddish Drama: A Comparative Study in Dramatic Development (Master's thesis). University of Illinois. hdl:2142/54515.

=== Letters and correspondence ===
- M. E. Ravage (n.d.), Letter to Hamlin Garland (Archival manuscript), No year specified, dated November 30, Los Angeles: USC Libraries Special Collections, doi:10.25549/gar-c81-27761 (Note: While the exact year of the correspondence with Hamlin Garland remains undetermined, the letterhead establishes that both writers resided in New York at that time. Such was the case in the late 1910s or alternatively the mid-1920s.)
- M. E. Ravage (n.d.), Letter to Hamlin Garland (Archival manuscript), No year specified, dated December 7, Los Angeles: USC Libraries Special Collections, doi:10.25549/gar-c81-27839
- M. E. Ravage (n.d.), Letter to Hamlin Garland (Archival manuscript), No year specified, dated December 10, Los Angeles: USC Libraries Special Collections, doi:10.25549/gar-c81-27204
- T. Roosevelt (April 30, 1917), Letter to M. E. Ravage (Archival manuscript), T.R. Papers, Library of Congress Manuscript Division, Theodore Roosevelt Digital Library, Dickinson State University
- T. Roosevelt (January 3, 1918), Letter to M. E. Ravage (Archival manuscript), T.R. Papers, Library of Congress Manuscript Division, Theodore Roosevelt Digital Library, Dickinson State University
- Secretary of T. Roosevelt (January 25, 1918), Letter to Max E. Ravage (Archival manuscript), T.R. Papers, Library of Congress Manuscript Division, Theodore Roosevelt Digital Library, Dickinson State University
- M. E. Ravage (November 24, 1919), Letter to Ida M. Tarbell, Peoples of America Society, hdl:10456/24216, JSTOR community.41808730
- M. E. Ravage (February 2, 1920), Letter to Ida M. Tarbell, Peoples of America Society, hdl:10456/24205, JSTOR community.41810871
- M. E. Ravage (December 28, 1936). "Correspondence to Spain. Letter To the Editor, European Edition, Paris, Dec. 24". The New York Herald Tribune. p. 4 – via Bibliothèque nationale de France.

== See also ==
=== Parallel antisemitic reframings of Jewish authorship ===
- Maurice Samuel – author of You Gentiles, whose cultural critique has been misread as hostility.
- Samuel Roth – author of Jews Must Live, whose autobiographical reflections have been distorted into caricature.
- A Racial Program for the Twentieth Century – a fabricated text falsely attributed to a Jewish author, widely cited in hoaxes and conspiracy literature.
- Theodore N. Kaufman – author of Germany Must Perish!, whose polemical fringe pamphlet was exploited by Nazi propaganda.

== Sources ==
- Gert Buelens (September 1993). "'An American in the Making' de Marcus Ravage, ou l'homme en devenir perpétuel". Configuration de l'ethnicité aux États-Unis. Cahiers Charles V n°15 (in French). Vol. 15. pp. 107–119, here: 109. doi:10.3406/cchav.1993.1079. – Analysis of Ravage's autobiography as a literary reconstruction of a fragmented self between origin and integration.
- Christopher Clausen (1994), "Grandfathers", My Life with President Kennedy, University of Iowa Press – Memoirs of his grandson Christopher Clausen, with sections on M. E. Ravage.
- Suzanne Ravage Clausen (1995), Growing Up Rootless, Santa Barbara: Fithian, ISBN 978-1-56474-131-8 – Memoirs of his daughter Suzanne Ravage Clausen, with section on M. E. Ravage.
- Deborah Hopkinson (2003), Shutting Out the Sky: Life in the Tenements of New York, 1880–1924, New York: Orchard (Scholastic), ISBN 978-0439-375900 – An account of five immigrant biographies for young readers, one of which was Ravage's.
- Steven G. Kellman (2009). "Chronology; Introduction". An American in the Making: The Life Story of an Immigrant. Book authored by M. E. Ravage; scholarly reedition ed. Steven G. Kellman (4th ed.). Rutgers University Press. pp. ix–xii, xiii–xxxi. ISBN 978-0-8135-4537-0. JSTOR j.ctt5hhx2m.5. – A scholarly introduction prepared for the new edition of Ravage's autobiography, together with a prefatory biographical chronology.
- Dana Mihăilescu (2018). Eastern European Jewish American Narratives, 1890–1930: Struggles for Recognition. Lexington Studies in Modern Jewish History. Lanham/Boulder/New York/London: Lexington Books. ISBN 9781498563895. – Study on literary self‑representation and identity conflicts among Eastern European Jewish immigrants in the United States.
- Dana Mihăilescu (December 2021). "Struggles Between Nationalism and Ethnicity in Eastern Europe and the United States, 1890s–1910s: The Life Writings of M. E. Ravage and Michael Gold". Quest. Issues in Contemporary Jewish History (20). doi:10.48248/issn.2037-741X/13087. – Comparative analysis of two transatlantic autobiographies.
- Cristina Stanciu (2015). "Marcus E. Ravage's An American in the Making, Americanization, and New Immigrant Representation". MELUS. 40 (2). Oxford University Press, Society for the Study of the Multi-Ethnic Literature of the United States (MELUS): 5–29. doi:10.1093/melus/mlv007. ISSN 0163-755X. JSTOR 24569972. – A scholarly analysis of Marcus E. Ravage's autobiography as a lens for understanding Americanization narratives and the literary representation of Eastern European immigrants in early 20th-century U.S. culture.
- Sanford Sternlicht (2004). "Marcus Eli Ravage". The Tenement Saga: The Lower East Side and the Early Jewish American Writers. Madison: Terrace Books/The University of Wisconsin Press. pp. 95–97. ISBN 978-029920483-9 – via Google Books. – Survey study of Jewish‑American migration literature of the Lower East Side, with a section on Ravage.
