= Steven G. Kellman =

American critic and academic (born 1947)

Steven G. Kellman (born November 15, 1947) is an American critic and academic, best known for his books Redemption:The Life of Henry Roth (2005) and The Translingual Imagination (2000).

== Life and career ==
Kellman was born in Brooklyn, New York. A graduate of Harpur College at Binghamton University (1967), he received his M.A. and Ph.D. in comparative literature from the University of California at Berkeley in 1969 and 1972, respectively.

Kellman has taught at the University of California campuses at Irvine and Berkeley. In 1976, he joined the faculty of the University of Texas at San Antonio, where he was the university's first Ashbel Smith Professor, from 1995-2000, and is currently a professor of comparative literature, specializing in fiction, film, and criticism. He was named Jack & Laura Richmond Endowed Faculty Fellow in American Literature in 2023. He was a Fulbright Senior Lecturer at Tbilisi State University in 1980 and held the Fulbright Distinguished Chair in American Literature at the University of Sofia in 2000. He is married to the poet Wendy Barker.

The weekly column that Kellman wrote for the San Antonio Light from 1983 until the newspaper's demise in 1993 won the H. L. Mencken Award in 1986. He is a contributing writer for The Texas Observer and the San Antonio Current. His film reviews were awarded first place in arts criticism by the Association of Alternative Newsweeklies in 2006. His essays and reviews have appeared in The American Scholar, Atlantic Monthly, Bookforum, Huffingtonpost.com, Forward, Southwest Review, Michigan Quarterly Review, New York Times Book Review, Georgia Review, The Nation, San Francisco Chronicle, Los Angeles Times, Chicago Tribune, Atlanta Journal Constitution, Gettysburg Review, and Virginia Quarterly Review, among many other publications. In 2007, he was awarded the National Book Critics Circle's Nona Balakian Citation for Excellence in Reviewing. Kellman was founding president of the literary center Gemini Ink and was elected into membership in the Texas Institute of Letters. He served two terms on the board of directors of the National Book Critics Circle, from 1996-2002, and began his third term in 2009. He began his fourth term in 2012. In 2010, he began serving as Vice President for Membership of the NBCC. He was a finalist for the Kukula Award for excellence in nonfiction reviewing in 2023.

Kellman's first book, The Self-Begetting Novel, appeared in 1980 and examines a subgenre of modern metafiction in which the protagonist ends up writing the novel in which he appears. Loving Reading: Erotics of the Text (1985) is a study in reader theory that explores the analogy between reading and making love. In two books, The Translingual Imagination (2000) - which Peter Bush in the Times Literary Supplement called “a passionately eloquent narrative of a new translingual world behind the English Curtain" - and Switching Languages: Translingual Writers Reflect on Their Craft (2003), Kellman surveyed the phenomenon of writers who write in more than one language or in a language other than their primary one. He provided further reflections on literary translingualism in Nimble Tongues (2020). His biography of the author of the 1934 novel Call It Sleep, Redemption: The Life of Henry Roth (2005), received the New York Society Library Award for Biography and was hailed by Josh Lambert in the San Francisco Chronicle as “not only a necessary addition to the annals of American literature, but also a trenchant exploration of the relationship between the horrors of life and the saving power of art." American Suite: A Literary History of the United States, Kellman's first book of poems, appeared in 2018. The Restless Ilan Stavans: Outsider on the Inside, the first book-length study of the prominent public intellectual Ilan Stavans, appeared in 2019. Kellman's selected essays, Rambling Prose, appeared in 2020. In 2025 he edited and wrote the Afterword to the Complete Poems of his late wife Wendy Barker. In 2025, the independent publisher Restless Books renamed its annual literary award the Steven Kellman Prize for Immigrant Literature.

== Books ==
- The Self-Begetting Novel, 1980, New York: Columbia University Press, 1980, London: Macmillan
- Loving Reading: Erotics of the Text, 1985, Hamden, Conn.: Archon
- Approaches to Teaching Camus’s The Plague, (editor), 1985, New York: Modern Language Association
- The Plague: Fiction and Resistance, 1993, Boston: Twayne
- Perspectives on Raging Bull, 1994, (editor), New York: G. K. Hall
- Into "The Tunnel": Readings of Gass’s Novel, 1998, (co-editor), Newark: University of Delaware Press
- Leslie Fiedler and American Culture, 1999, (co-editor), Newark: University of Delaware Press
- The Translingual Imagination, 2000, Lincoln, NE: University of Nebraska Press
- Torpid Smoke: The Stories of Vladimir Nabokov, 2000, (co-editor), Amsterdam: Rodopi
- Magill’s Literary Annual, 2001–present, (co-editor), Pasadena: Salem Press
- Underwords: Perspectives on Don DeLillo’s Underworld, 2002, (co-editor), Newark: University of Delaware Press
- Switching Languages: Translingual Writers Reflect on Their Craft, 2003, (editor), Lincoln, NE: University of Nebraska Press
- Redemption: The Life of Henry Roth, 2005, New York: W. W. Norton
- Magill’s Survey of American Literature, rev. ed., 2007, (editor), Pasadena: Salem Press
- Magill’s Survey of World Literature, rev. ed., 2009, (editor), Pasadena: Salem Press
- M. E. Ravage, An American in the Making, (editor), 2009, New Brunswick, NJ: Rutgers University Press
- Critical Insights: Albert Camus, (editor), 2011, Pasadena: Salem Press
- American Suite: A Literary History of the United States. 2018, Georgetown, KY: Finishing Line Press
- The Restless Ilan Stavans: Outsider on the Inside. 2019, Pittsburgh, PA: University of Pittsburgh Press
- Nimble Tongues: Studies in Literary Translingualism. 2020, West Lafayette, IN: Purdue University Press
- Rambling Prose: Essays. 2020, San Antonio, TX: Trinity University Press
- The Routledge Handbook of Literary Translingualism. 2021, (co-editor), New York: Routledge
- Complete Poems Wendy Barker, 2025, (editor and afterword), Baton Rouge, LA: Louisiana State University Press
