= Wendy Barker =

American poet (1942–2023)

Wendy Barker (September 22, 1942 – March 11, 2023) was an American poet. She was Poet-in-Residence and the Pearl LeWinn Chair of Creative Writing at the University of Texas at San Antonio, where she taught since 1982.

== Biography ==
Barker was born September 22, 1942, in Summit, New Jersey, but grew up in Phoenix and Tucson, Arizona. Between 1968 and 1982 she lived in Berkeley, California. She received her B.A. and M.A. from Arizona State University and her Ph.D. in 1981 from the University of California, Davis. Barker also taught high school English in Scottsdale, Arizona, between 1966–68 and in Berkeley, between 1968 and 1972. She was married to the critic Steven G. Kellman.

Her sixth collection of poems is One Blackbird at a Time, winner of the John Ciardi Prize for Poetry (BkMk Press, 2015). Her fourth chapbook is From the Moon, Earth is Blue (Wings Press, 2015). An anthology, Far Out: Poems of the 60s, co-edited with David M. Parsons, was published by Wings Press in 2016. She has also published a selection of poems with accompanying drafts and essays about the writing process. Her translations (with Saranindranath Tagore) of Nobel Prize-winning poet Rabindranath Tagore received the Sourette Diehl Fraser Award from the Texas Institute of Letters.

Barker’s poems have appeared in such journals as Poetry, The American Scholar, The Georgia Review, The Southern Review, The Southern Poetry Review, The Gettysburg Review, Harpur Palate, The Marlboro Review, The Laurel Review, and Boulevard. Her poems have appeared in numerous anthologies, including The Best American Poetry 2013. Translations (with Saranindranath Tagore) of Rabindranath Tagore have appeared in such places as Partisan Review, The Kenyon Review, Stand, Puerto del Sol, and The Hollins Critic. Translations (with Amritjit Singh) of the Punjabi poet Gurcharan Rampuri have appeared in The Toronto Review of Contemporary Writing Abroad. Personal essays have appeared in Poets & Writers, Southwest Review, and the online journal Cerise Press: A Journal of Literature, Arts & Culture. Recipient of fellowships from the National Endowment for the Arts and the Rockefeller Foundation, her work has been translated into Chinese, Japanese, Hindi, Russian, and Bulgarian.

One Blackbird at a Time, Alan Shapiro says, "is one of the most personable, entertaining and moving books of poetry I've read in a long time". Ken Prufer describes the poems as "rich, complex, and shimmering with energy and intelligence." "A wonderful book of poems" that are "full of ferocity and rapture, a joy to read," states Alicia Ostriker

Barker's fifth collection of poems, Nothing Between Us: The Berkeley Years, a novel in prose poems set in Berkeley in the sixties (Del Sol Press, 2009), has been described as "unforgettably moving" by Sandra M. Gilbert; "a captivating page-turner" by Alicia Ostriker; and an "exciting tribute to a decade of change" by Denise Duhamel.

Barker died on March 11, 2023, at the age of 80. Her Complete Poems, edited by her husband Steven G. Kellman, was published posthumously in 2025 (LSU Press).

== Books ==
Poems

- Complete Poems Wendy Barker, ed. Steven G. Kellman (Baton Rouge: Louisiana State University Press, 2025).
- Those Roads, These Moons(Alabrava Press, 2024).
- Weave: New and Selected Poems (BkMk Press, 2022).
- Shimmer (Glass Lyre Press, 2019).
- Gloss (Saint Julian Press, 2019).
- One Blackbird at a Time (BkMk Press, 2015).
- From the Moon, Earth is Blue (Wings Press, 2015).
- Far Out: Poems of the 60s, co-edited with David M. Parsons (Wings Press, 2016).
- Nothing Between Us: The Berkeley Years (Washington, D.C., Del Sol Press, 2009).
- Things of the Weather [a chapbook] (Columbus: Pudding House, 2009).
- Between Frames [a chapbook] (San Antonio: Pecan Grove Press, 2006).
- Poems from Paradise (Cincinnati: WordTech Editions, 2005).
- Poems’ Progress [a selection of poems with accompanying essays] (Houston: Absey & Co., 2002).
- Way of Whiteness: Poems (San Antonio: Wings Press, 2000).
- Eve Remembers [a chapbook] (London: Aark Arts, 1996).
- Let the Ice Speak: Poems (Greenfield Center: Ithaca House Books, Greenfield Review Press, 1991).
- Winter Chickens and Other Poems (San Antonio: Corona Publishing, 1990).

Translations

- Tagore: Final Poems, co-translated with Saranindranath Tagore (New York: George Braziller, 2001).

Criticism

- The House Is Made of Poetry: The Art of Ruth Stone, co-edited with Sandra M. Gilbert (Carbondale: Southern Illinois University Press, 1996).
- Lunacy of Light: Emily Dickinson and the Experience of Metaphor (Carbondale: Southern Illinois University Press, 1987, Rept. paperback ed., 1991. Japanese trans., 1991).

== Awards ==
- John Ciardi Prize for Poetry, BkMk Press, 2015.
- Runner-Up, Del Sol Press Poetry Prize (for book manuscript, Nothing Between Us: The Berkeley Years) 2008.
- Finalist, James Wright Poetry Award, Mid-American Review, 2008.
- Violet Crown Book Award (for Between Frames), 2007.
- Literature Fellowship in Poetry, Writers’ League of Texas, 2003.
- Gemini Ink Literary Excellence Award, 2002.
- Sourette Diehl Fraser Award for Literary Translation, Texas Institute of Letters, 2002.
- Fulbright Senior Lecturer, St. Kliment Ohridski University of Sofia, Bulgaria, Fall 2000.
- Violet Crown Book Award (for Way of Whiteness), 2000.
- Citation for Excellence Award, Cal Aggie Alumni Association, University of California at Davis, 1995.
- Rockefeller Foundation Residency Fellowship, Bellagio Study and Conference Center, 1994.
- The Mary Elinore Smith Poetry Prize, The American Scholar, 1991.
- Distinguished Citizen Award, City of San Antonio, 1991.
- Arts and Letters Award, Friends of the San Antonio Library, 1991.
- Ithaca House Poetry Series Award, 1990.
- National Endowment for the Arts Creative Writing Fellowship in Poetry, 1986.
- Southwest Women Artists and Writers Award for Poetry, 1982.
