= Roggenmarkt (Münster) =

City square market in Münster Germany

Coordinates: 51°57′48.50″N 7°37′41″E

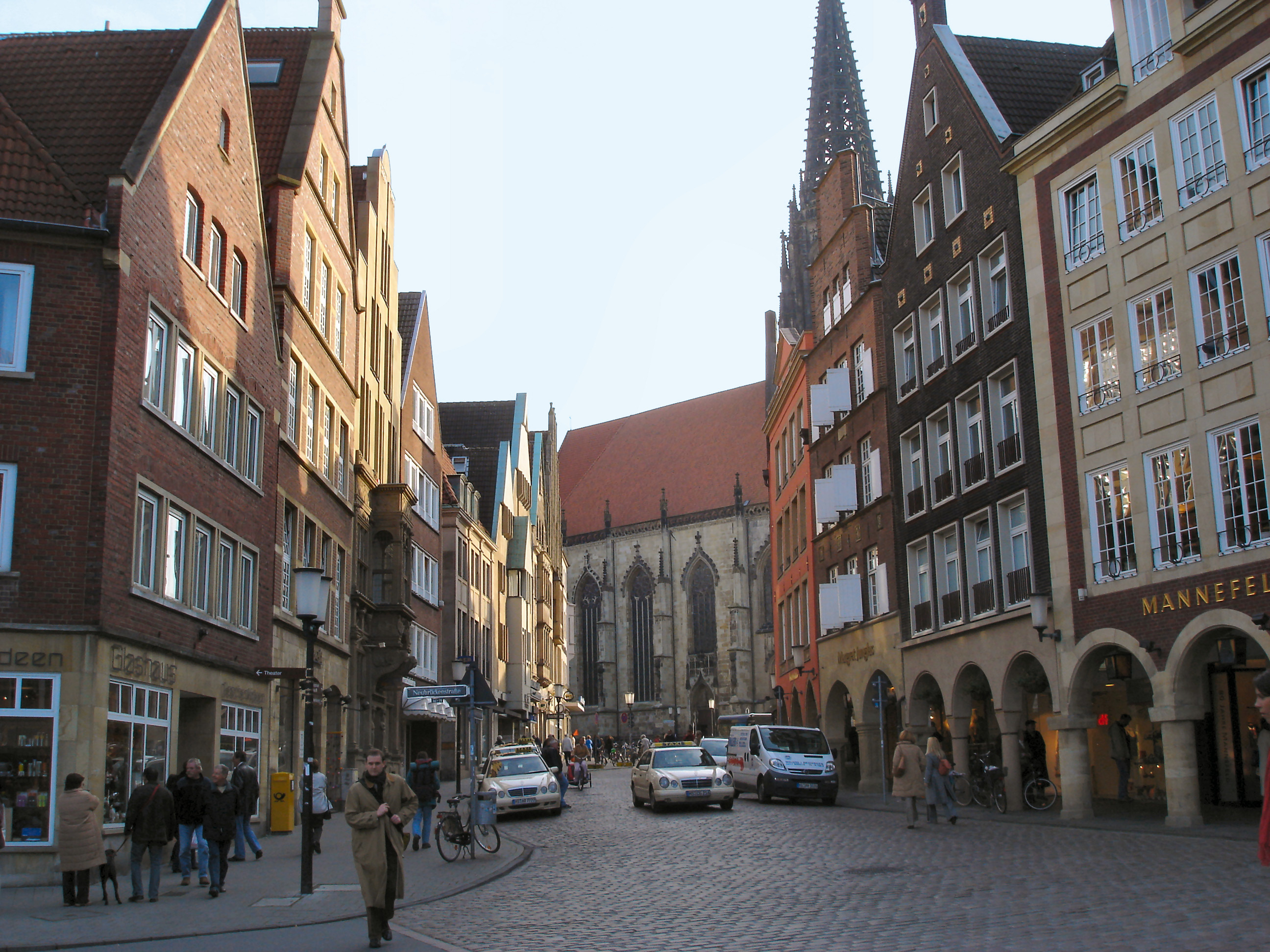
View of the Roggenmarkt. In the background is St. Lamberti's Church.

Roggenmarkt is a city square and marketplace in the city of Münster in the German state of North Rhine-Westphalia. It lies to the northeast of the Münster Cathedral at the city center. The Roggenmarkt is located north of the city's main Prinzipalmarkt and extends in an arc to the west away from St. Lambert's Church. The two markets flow into each other.

It was created by the middle of the 10th century and, together with the adjacent Old Fish Market (German: Alter Fischmarkt), is one of the oldest markets in the city. Roggenmarkt got its name because rye (German: Roggen) and other grains were mainly traded there. It lay on an important trade route in the east–west direction of Holland, and in the immediate vicinity of the major north–south connection from the Rhineland in the north and Friesland, Bremen, and also later Lübeck. As the principal market of rye, it was almost completely destroyed in the Second World War, and rebuilt thereafter to a large extent on the basis of the original.
