= Fusgeyer =

Group of Jewish Romanian emigrants

The fusgeyers (Yiddish: פֿוסגײער, "pedestrian" or "wayfarer"; Romanian: drumeți or pietoni) were a movement of Romanian Jews who emigrated in an organized manner from Romania from 1900 to 1920. Their name refers to the fact that they were often too poor even to purchase a train ticket to a port city. Roughly 60,000 Jews left the country during that period, going to Austria and Germany and then onwards via port cities to Canada and the United States. The number of specifically fusgeyer emigrants may be lower, perhaps a few thousand.

== History ==
The 1866 Constitution of Romania barred citizenship for non-Christians, meaning that most Jews in the country lived with severely reduced rights. Various attempts at mass Jewish emigration happened between that year and 1900, often in the face of resistance from the Romanian government After a famine in 1899 and outbreaks of antisemitic violence, many young Romanian Jews developed a new practice of emigration: banding into disciplined groups which would share resources and leave the country together. The first such group was created in May 1899 in Bârlad. A man named Ginsburg recruited 94 people who started calling themselves "the Wayfarers from Bârlad". This group inspired several other groups from other cities, which either named themselves after their city, the name of their occupation, or by a romantic name such as "One Heart" or "The Wandering Jew".

After they reached the Austro-Hungarian border, they were often provided funds for rail passage by charitable Jewish organizations.

== Literary representation ==
Many of the current-day articles about the fusgeyers cite Jill Culiner's 2004 book Finding Home: In the Footsteps of the Jewish Fusgeyers for most of their factual information. Her book in turn was inspired by the Yiddish language memoir of one of the original fusgeyers, Jacob Finkelstein's "Zikhroynes fun a fusgeyer fun Rumania kayn Amerika", which won a contest by the YIVO in 1945 and was printed in their journal, YIVO Bleter.
