= Philipp Heidenheim =

German rabbi and educator

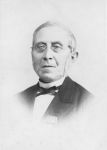

Personal life
- Born: 14 June 1814 Bleicherode, Germany
- Died: 14 June 1906 (aged 92) Sondershausen, Germany
- Buried: Sondershausen Jewish Cemetery
- Spouse: Lina Leser (m. 1839; died 1897)

Religious life
- Religion: Judaism
- Denomination: Liberal Judaism

Philipp Heidenheim (14 June 1814 – 14 June 1906) was a German rabbi and educator.

== Biography ==
Heidenheim was born in Bleicherode on 14 June 1814. In 1834 he was called as teacher to Sondershausen, where he worked under I. Wolffson, whom he succeeded in 1837 as principal and preacher. In 1840 he was appointed teacher at the Realschule, where he taught (1840–86) mathematics, geography, German, Latin, and history.

Heidenheim meanwhile pursuied rabbinical studies under the direction of Leiser Lazarus of Wieleń. In 1845, having received his ordination from Rabbi Löb Blaschke in Schönlanke and from Rabbis J. J. Oettinger and Michael Sachs in Berlin, he was appointed Landesrabbiner of the principality of Schwarzburg-Sondershausen; and shortly afterward the few scattered Jewish communities in the principality of Schwarzburg-Rudolstadt were added to his jurisdiction.

In 1848 he attended the conference of German teachers held in Eisenach, and was elected one of its officers. It was due to his initiative that in the first section of the constitution, which originally read, "The foundation of all education is Christian," the word "Christian" was changed to "moral and religious" (German: sittlich-religiös). Four hundred members voted in favour of the amendment, proposed by Heidenheim; and this so embittered a missionary who was present that he exclaimed: "We have sold Christ to the Jews."

== Personal life ==
Heidenheim married Lina Leser on 28 August 1839. The marriage produced six children: Richard (born 1840), Henriette Bier (1842–1919), Louis (born 1844), Bruno (born 1846), Gustav (born 1850), and Amalie Ehrenberg (born 1852).
