= List of museums in the Netherlands =

This is a list of museums in the Netherlands.

== Drenthe ==
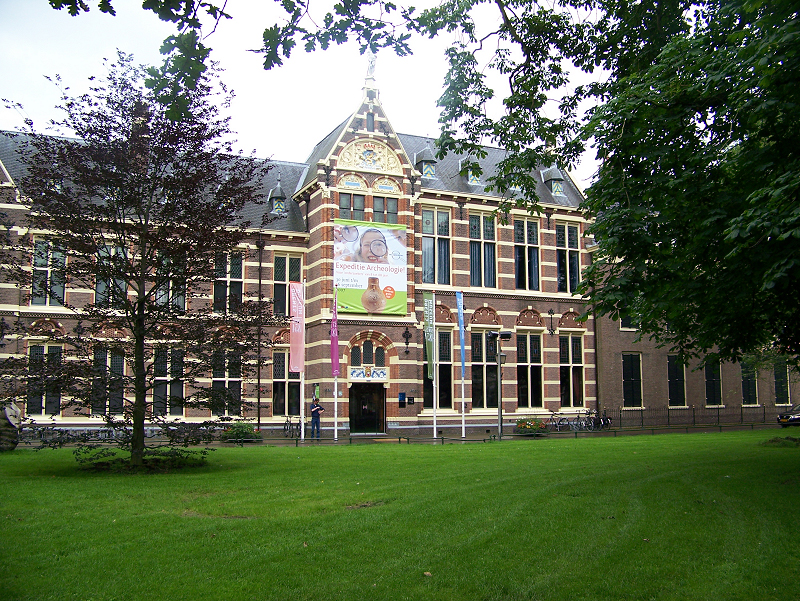
Assen Drents Museum

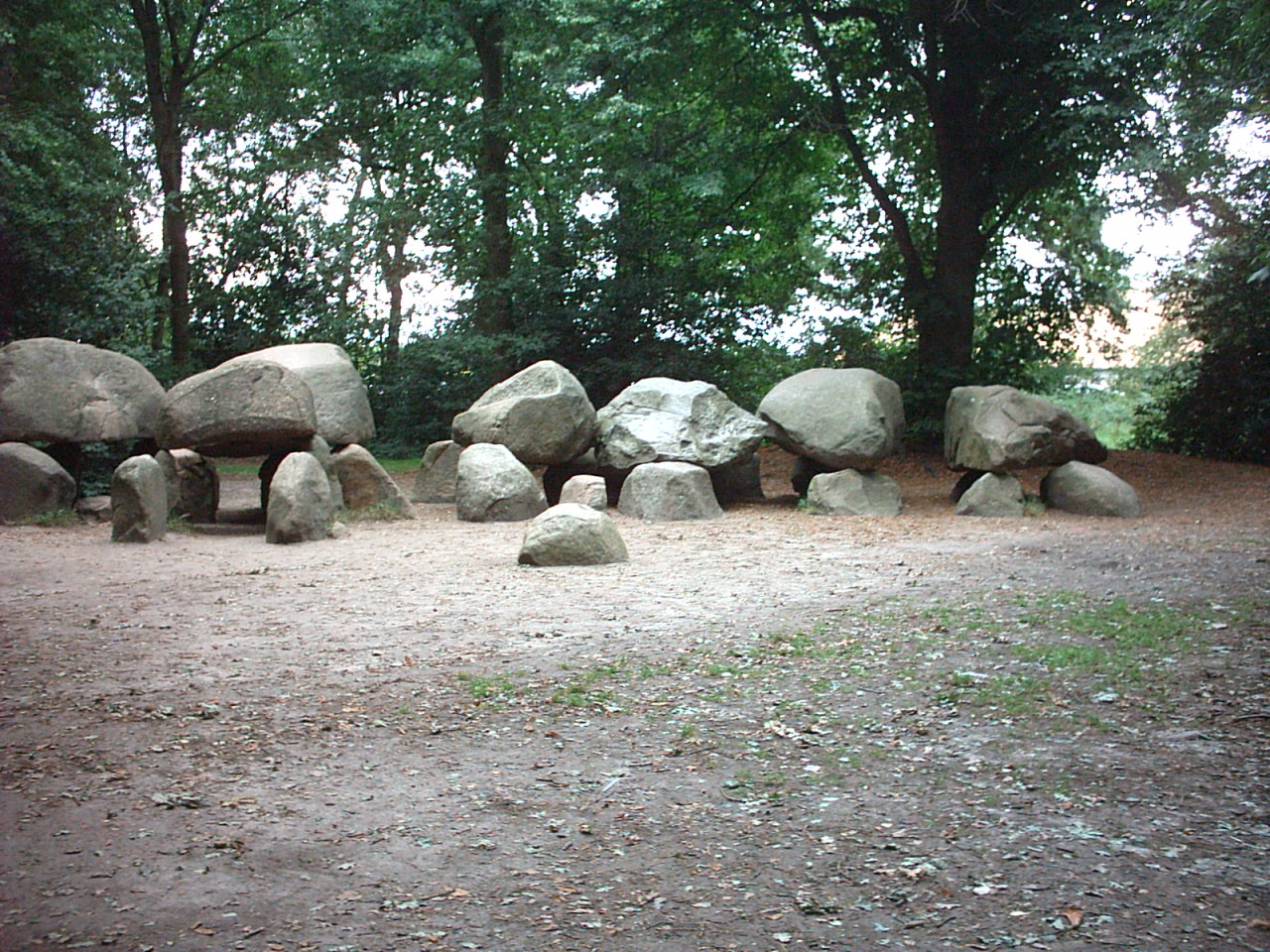
Borger Hunebed bij Centrum

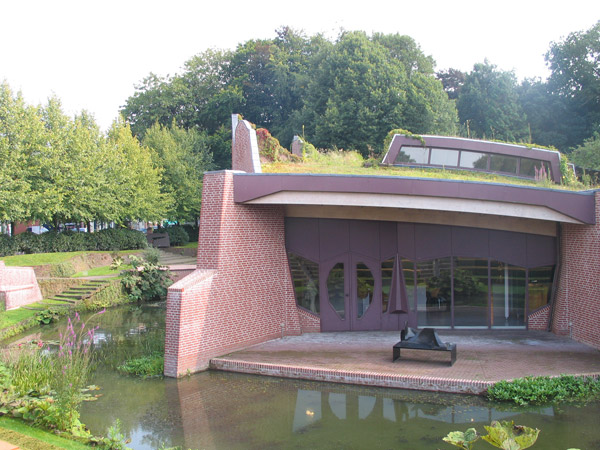
Eelde Museum de Buitenplaats

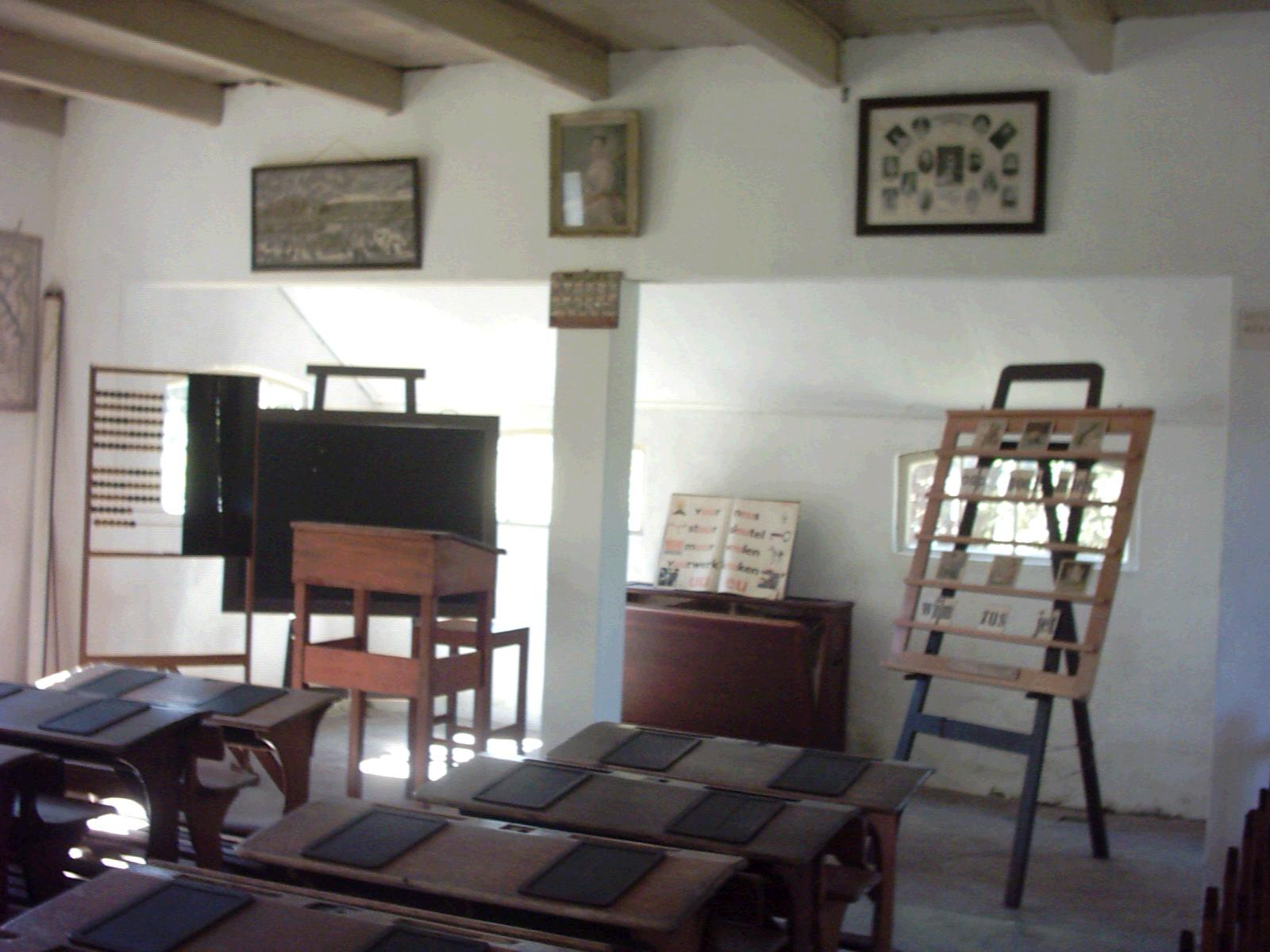
Schoonoord Ellert en Brammert Museum

=== Assen ===
- Draaiorgelmuseum
- Drents Museum
- Stoottroepen Museum

=== Borger-Odoorn ===
- Hunebedcentrum

=== Coevorden ===
- Stedelijk Museum (Coevorden)

=== Dwingeloo ===
- Planetron (Dwingeloo)

=== Eelde ===
- Museum de Buitenplaats
- International Wooden Shoe Museum Eelde
- Museum Vosbergen

=== Emmen ===
- Ergens in Nederland 1939-1945

=== Erica ===
- Industrieel Smalspoor Museum

=== Exloo ===
- Het Bebinghehoes

=== Frederiksoord ===
- Museum De Koloniehof

=== Hoogeveen ===
- De 5000 Morgen

=== Meppel ===
- Drukkerijmuseum

=== Nieuw-Buinen ===
- Royal Goedewaagen

=== Nieuw-Dordrecht ===
- Museum Collectie Brands

=== Nieuw-Roden ===
- Kunstpaviljoen

=== Orvelte ===
- Orvelte

=== Roden ===
- Speelgoedmuseum Kinderwereld

=== Rolde ===
- Cuby + Blizzards Museum in Grolloo
- Het Dorp van Bartje

=== Schoonoord ===
- Ellert en Brammert

=== Veenhuizen ===
- Gevangenismuseum

=== Vledder ===
- Miramar Zeemuseum
- Museums Vledder

=== Zuidlaren ===
- De Wachter Molenmuseum

== Flevoland ==
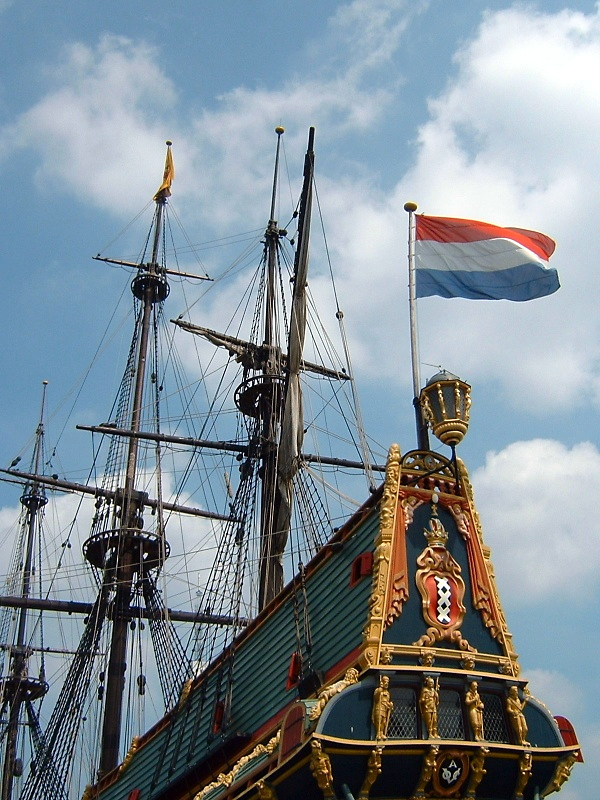
Lelystad de Batavia op de werf

=== Almere ===
- Museum De Paviljoens

=== Ens ===
- Museum Schokland

=== Espel ===
- Ferguson Farm

=== Lelystad ===
- Nationaal Luchtvaart Themapark Aviodrome
- Bataviawerf
- Nationaal Ruimtevaart Museum
- Nieuw Land Poldermuseum
- RACM Lelystad

=== Nagele ===
- Museum Nagele

=== Urk ===
- Het Oude Raadhuis

=== Zeewolde ===
- De Verbeelding kunst landschap natuur

== Friesland ==
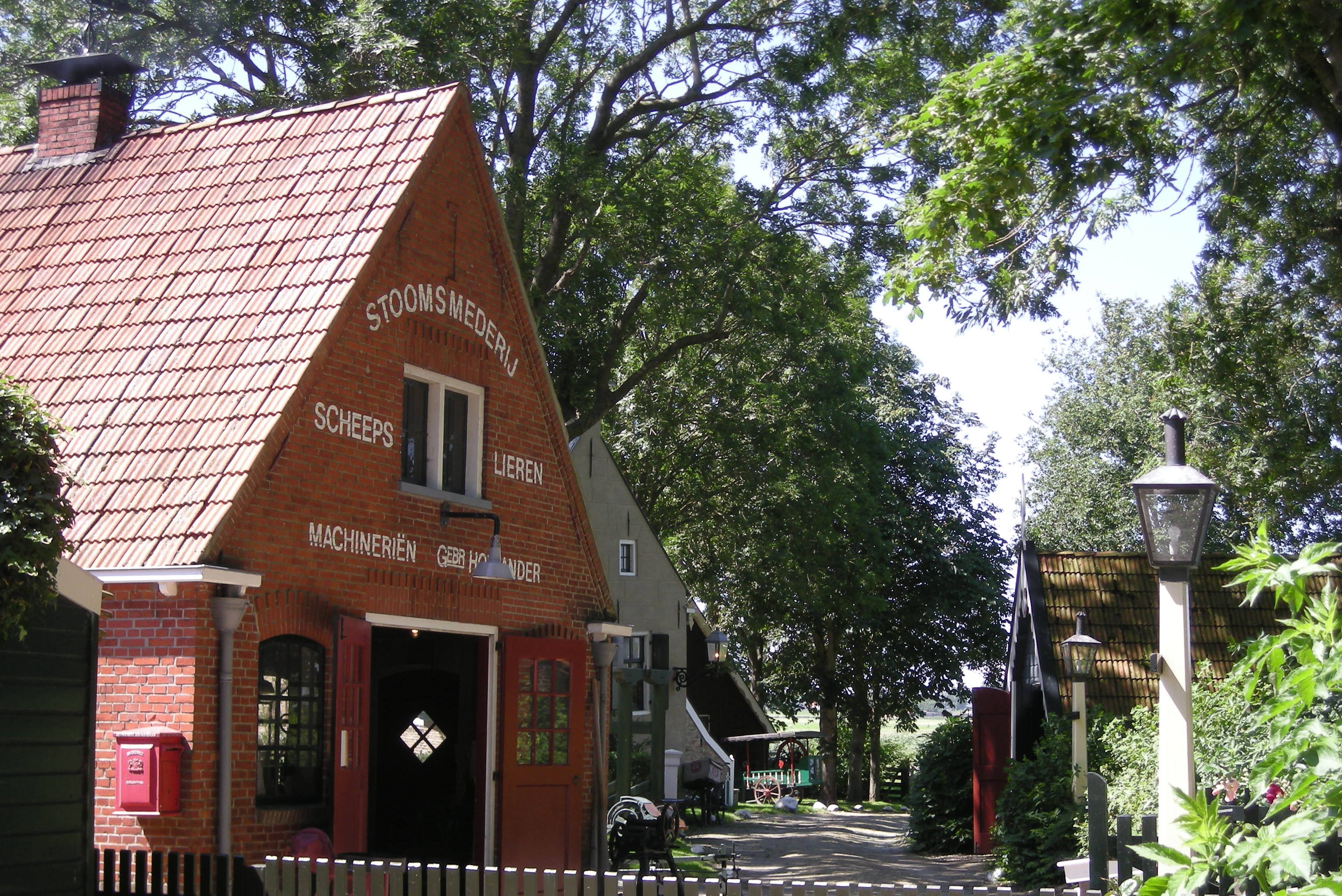
Allingawier Stoomsmederij

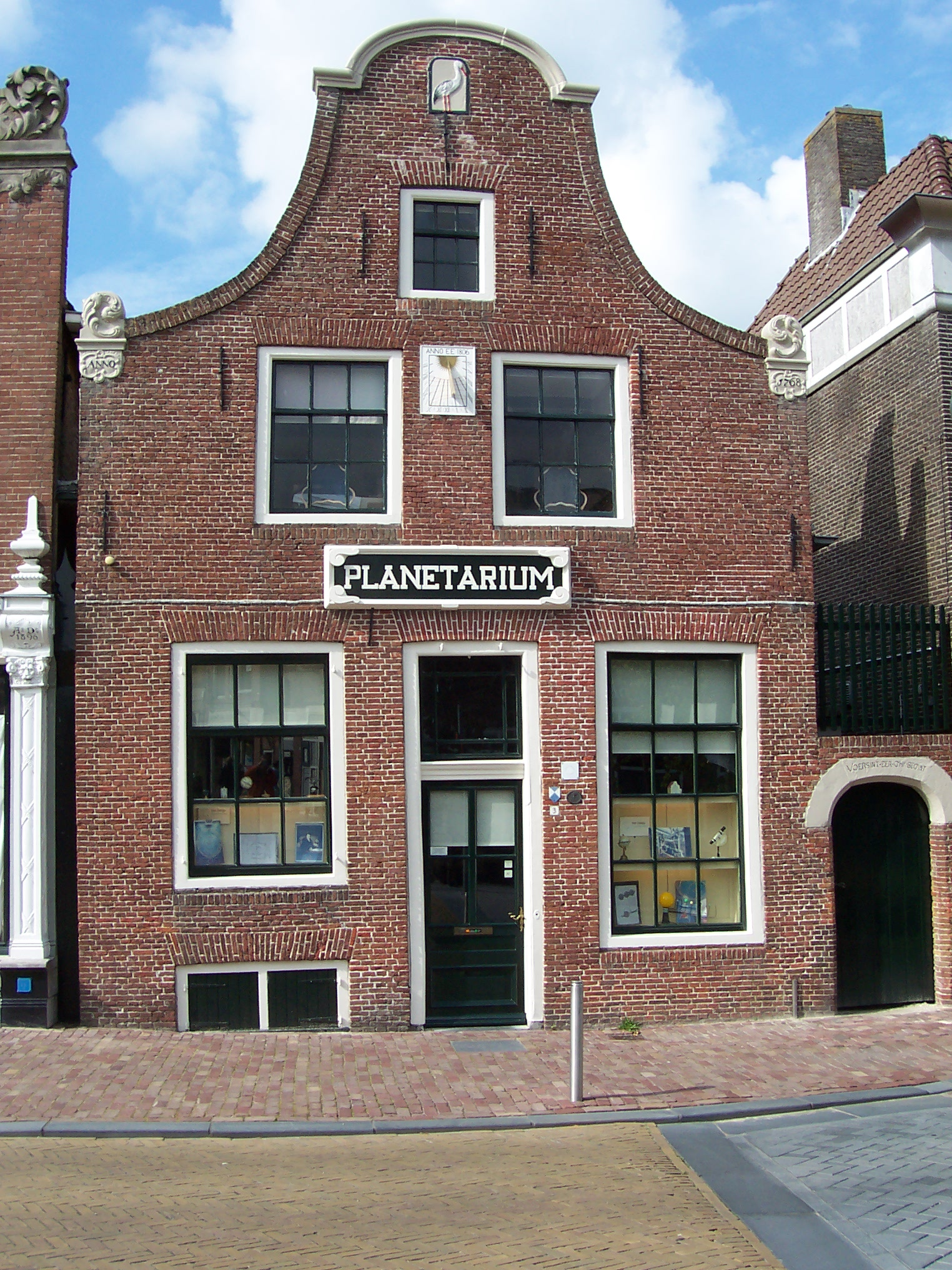
Franeker Planetarium Eisinga

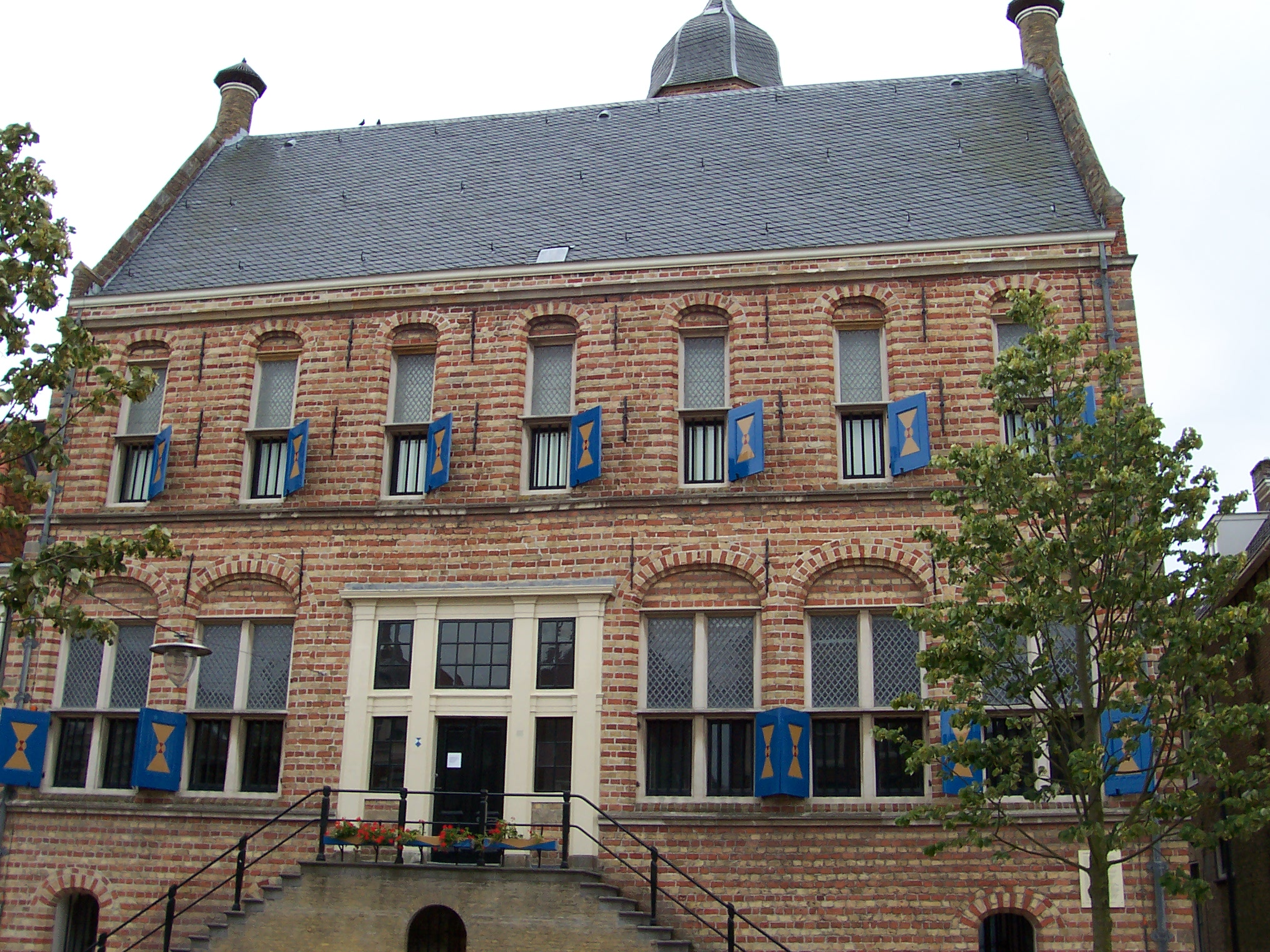
Franeker stadsmuseum Martena

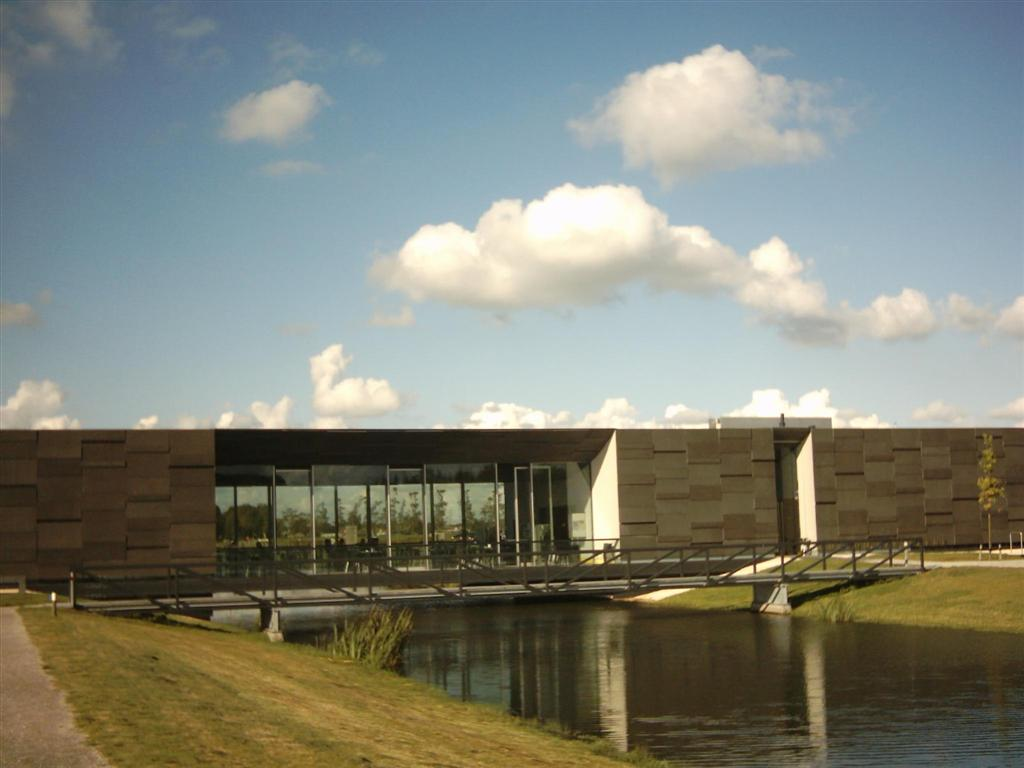
Heerenveen Museum Belvédère

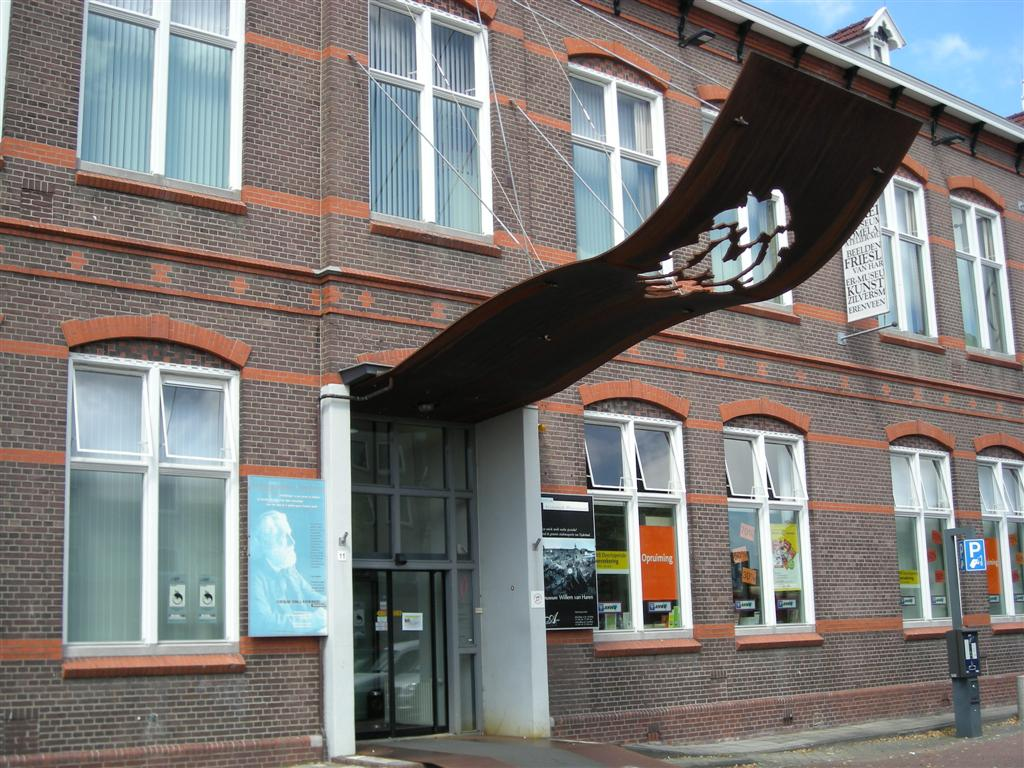
Heerenveen Museum Willem van Haren

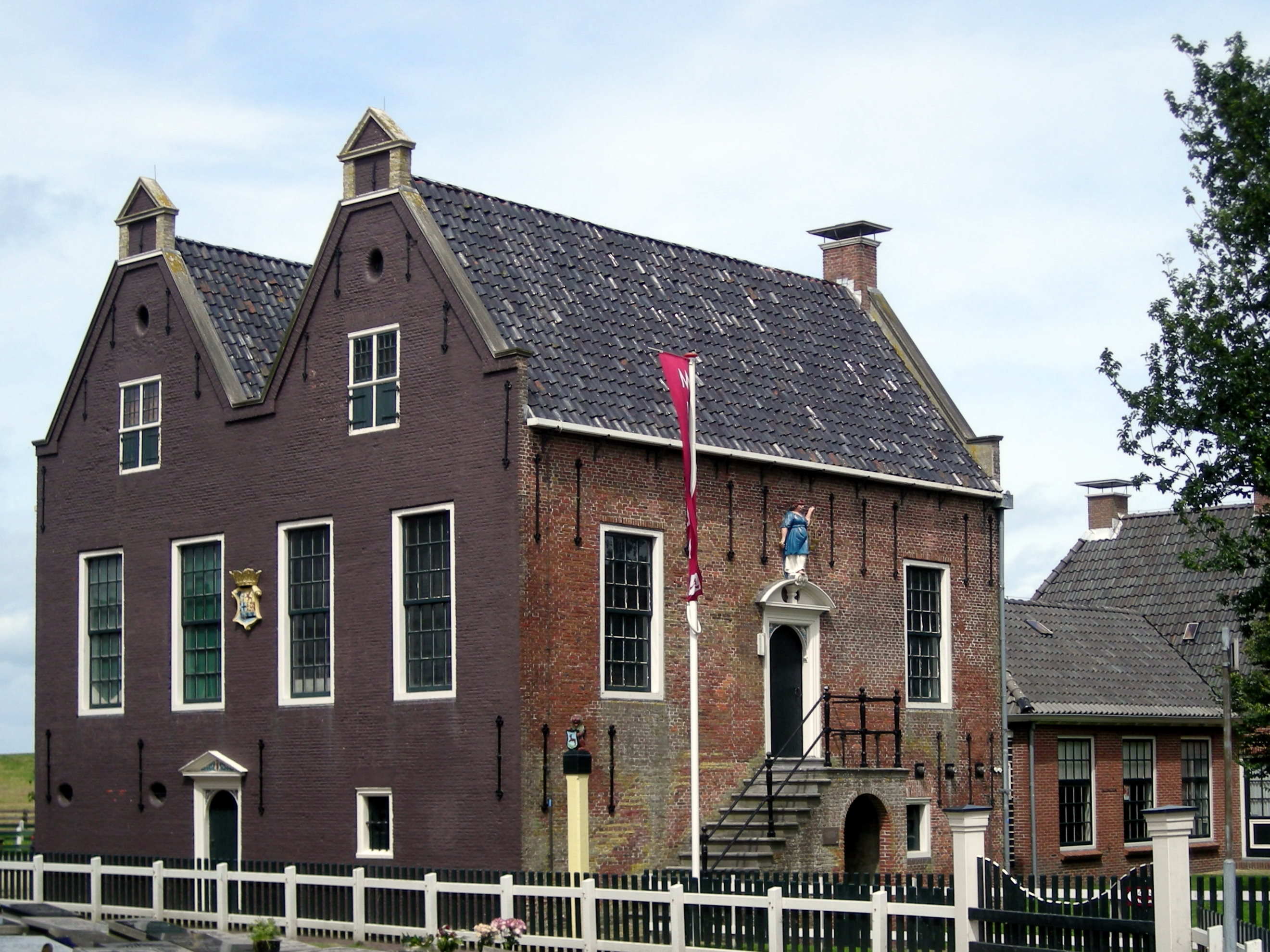
Hindeloopen Museum Hindeloopen

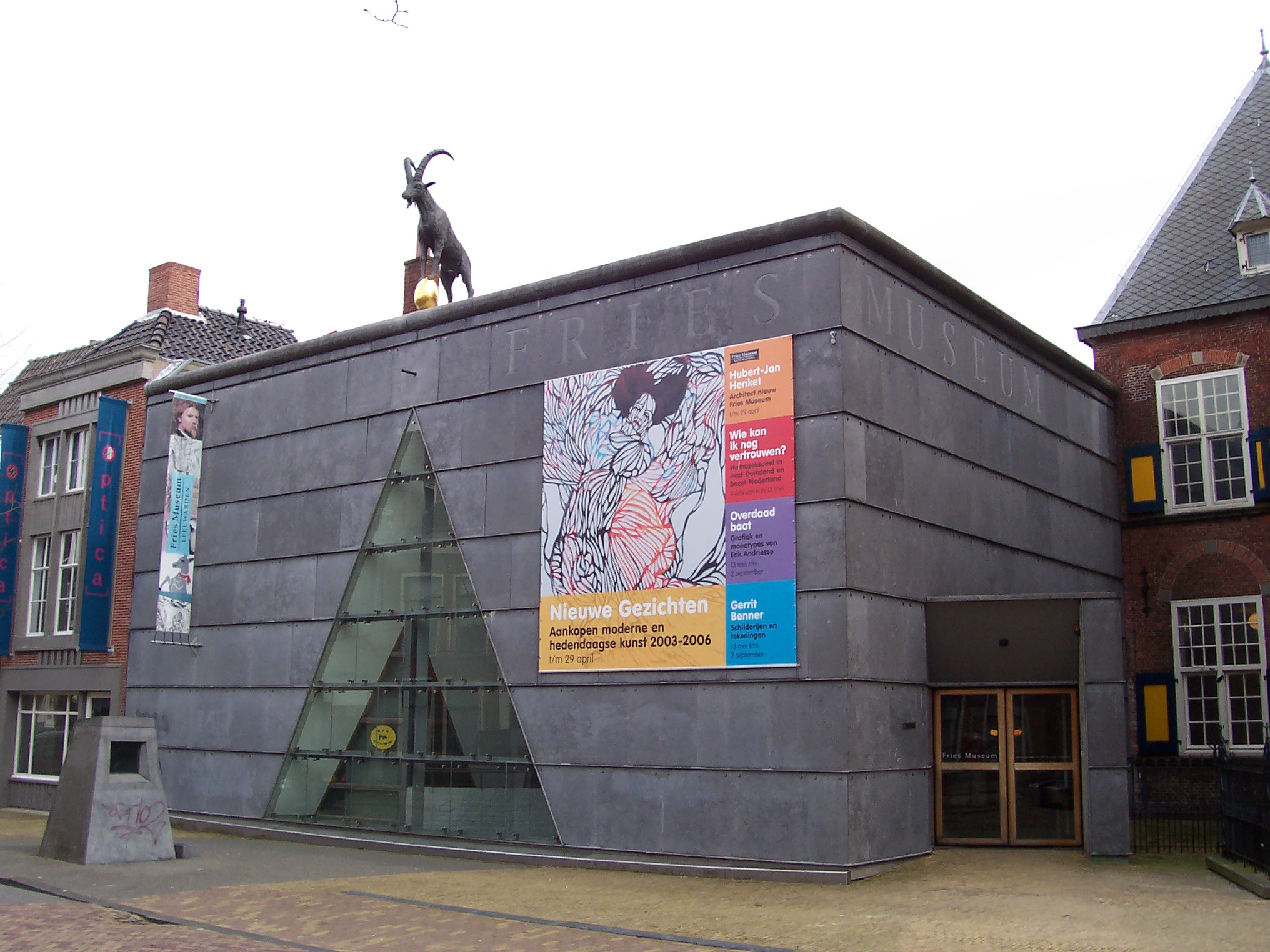
Leeuwarden Fries Museum

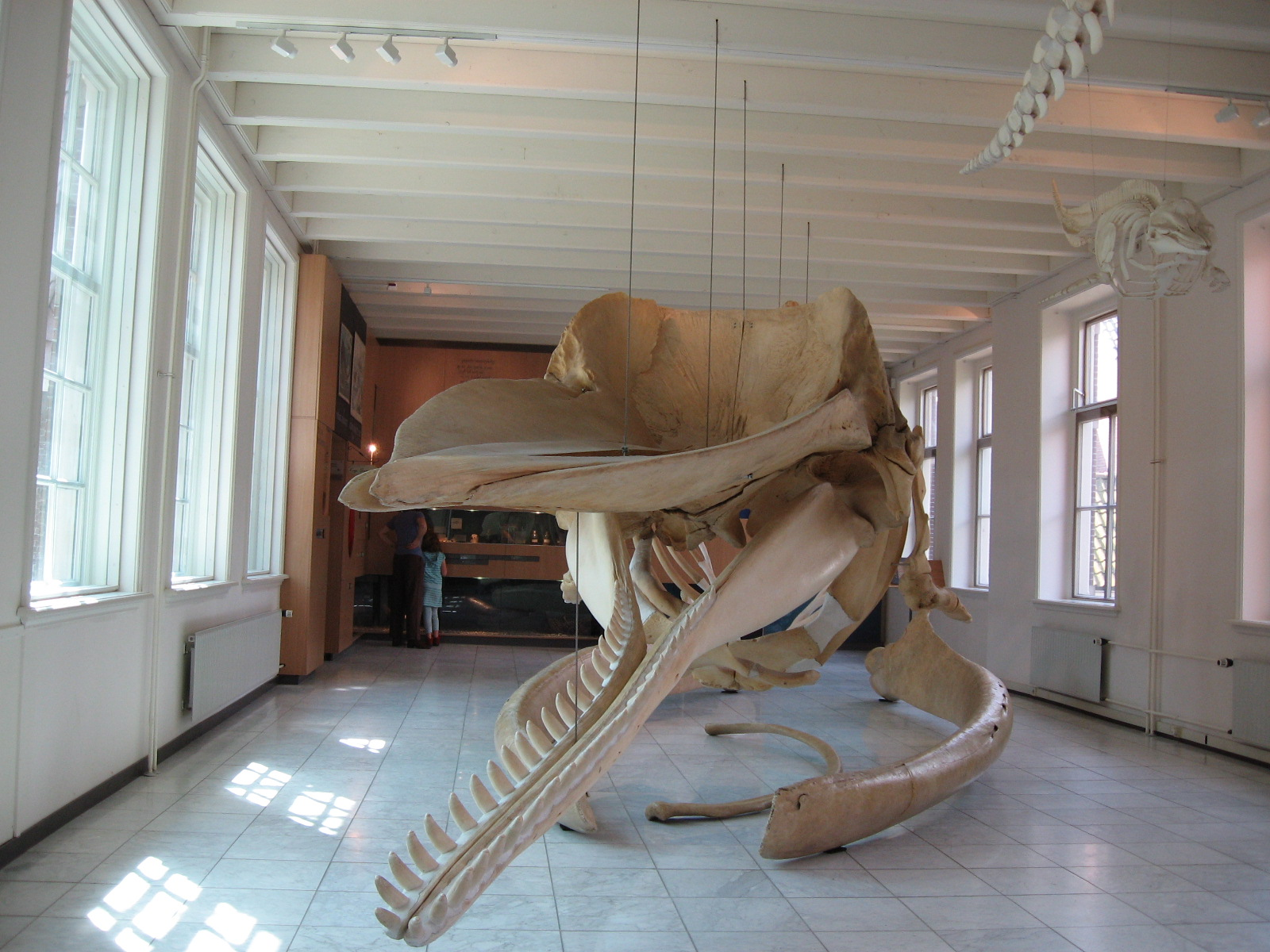
Leeuwarden Natuurmuseum Fryslân

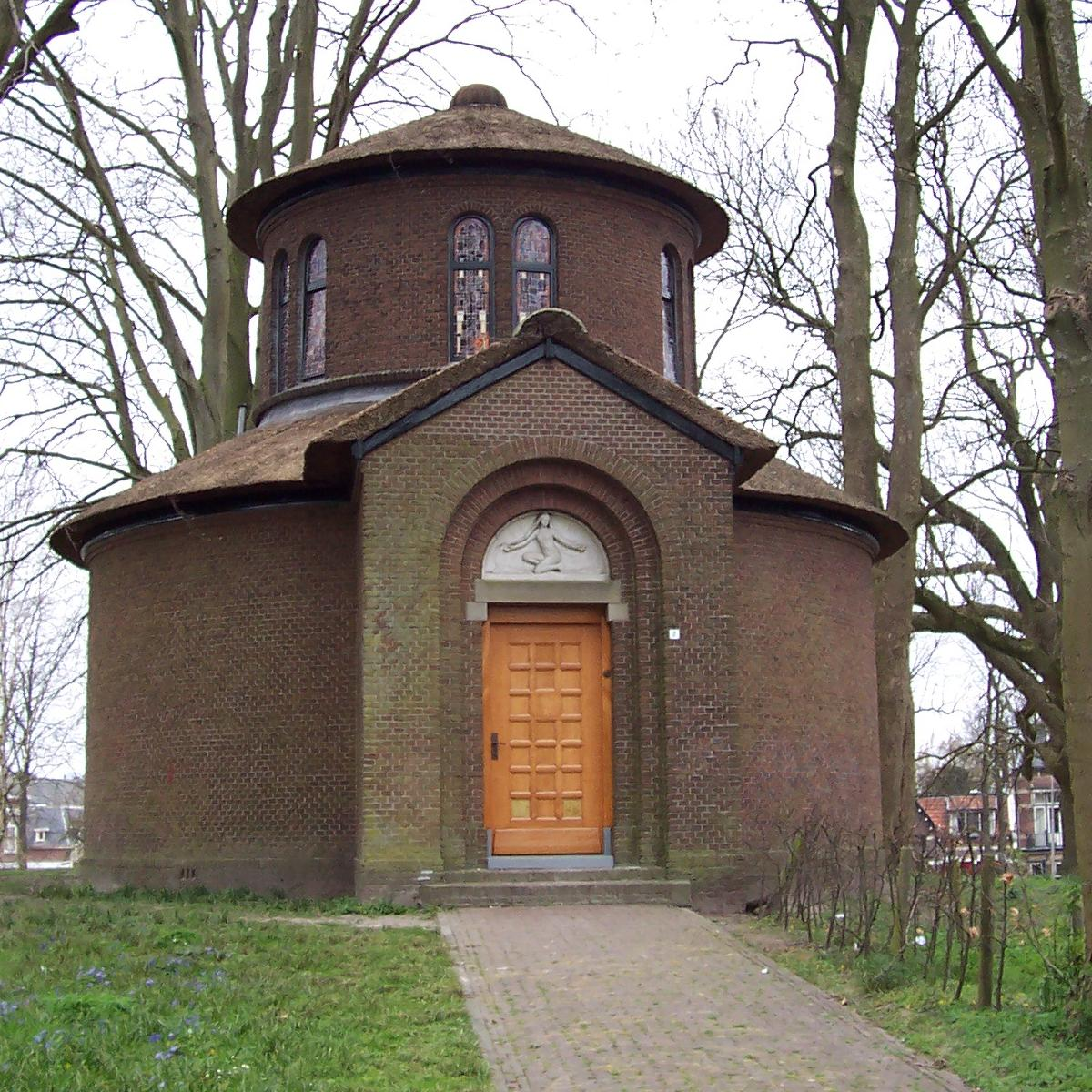
Leeuwarden Pier Pander Tempel

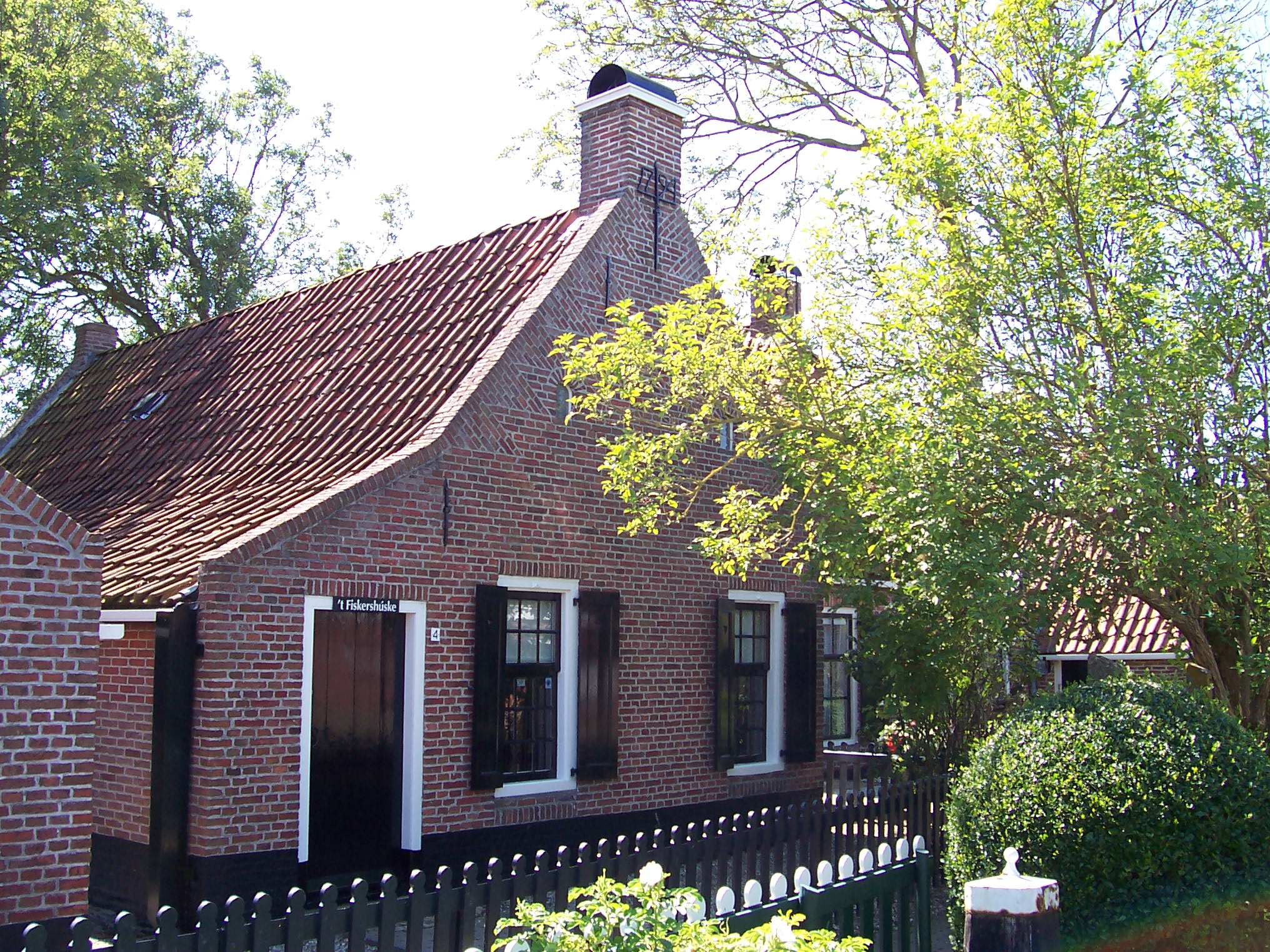
Moddergat Museum 't Fiskershúske

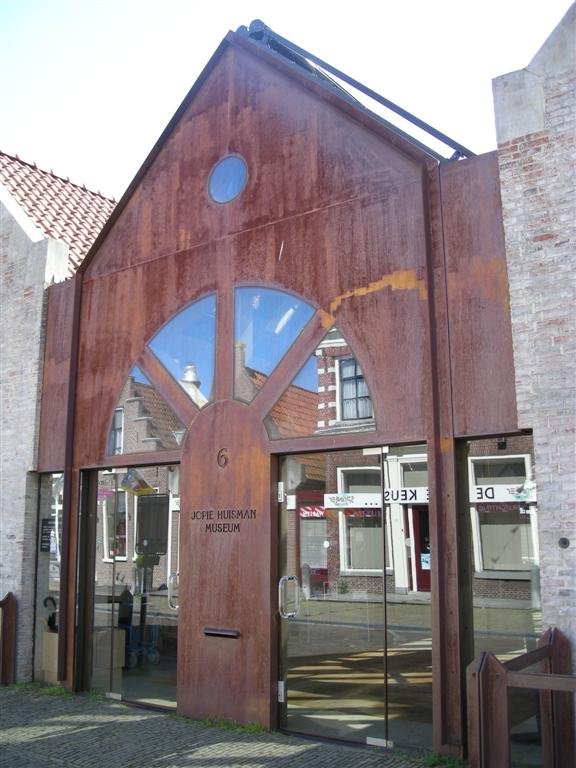
Workum Jopie Huisman Museum

=== Allingawier ===
- Aldfaerserf

=== Appelscha ===
- Culinair Historisch Kookmuseum

=== Bakhuizen ===
- Scheermuseum

=== Beers ===
- Bezoekerscentrum Uniastate

=== Bergum ===
- Streekmuseum/Volkssterrenwacht

=== Birdaard ===
- Ruurd Wiersma Hus

=== Bolsward ===
- It Gysbert Japicxhus
- Us Heit

=== Buren ===
- Swartwoude

=== Dokkum ===
- Admiraliteitshuis
- Fries Grafisch Museum

=== Drachten ===
- Museum Smallingerland

=== Eernewoude ===
- De Stripe

=== Exmorra ===
- Fries landbouw museum

=== Franeker ===
- Museum Martena (voorheen 't Coopmanshûs)
- Eise Eisinga Planetarium

=== Gorredijk ===
- Museum Opsterland

=== Grouw ===
- Mineralogisch Museum

=== Harlingen ===
- Gemeentemuseum het Hannemahuis

=== Heerenveen ===
- Museum Belvédère
- Museum Willem van Haren met F. Domela Nieuwenhuis Museum

=== Hindeloopen ===
- Eerste Friese Schaatsmuseum
- Museum Hindeloopen

=== Hollum ===
- Abraham Fock
- Sorgdrager

=== IJlst ===
- Kijk Centrum Nooitgedagt

=== Jelsum ===
- Dekemastate

=== Joure ===
- Museum Joure

=== Kornwerderzand ===
- Kazemattenmuseum

=== Leeuwarden ===
- Fries Letterkundig Centrum
- Fries Museum/ Verzetsmuseum Friesland
- Natuurmuseum Fryslân
- Pier Pander Museum
- Princessehof (nationaal keramiekmuseum)

=== Lemmer ===
- Duikmuseum Lemmer

=== Marsum ===
- Poptaslot

=== Moddergat ===
- Museum 't Fiskerhúske

=== Molkwerum ===
- Elvis Presley museum

=== Nij Beets ===
- It Damshûs

=== Nijemirdum ===
- Koeienmuseum

=== Oldeboorn ===
- Oudheidkamer Uldrik Bottema

=== Schiermonnikoog ===
- Schelpenmuseum Paal 14

=== Sloten ===
- Museum Stedhûs Sleat

=== Sneek ===
- Nationaal Modelspoormuseum
- Fries Scheepvaart Museum

=== Stavoren ===
- Ponthuus Toankamer

=== Tijnje ===
- 1e Nederlandse Opel Museum

=== Vlieland ===
- De Noordwester
- Museum Tromp's Huys

=== West-Terschelling ===
- 't Behouden Huys
- Visserijmuseum Aike van Stien

=== Wolvega ===
- Museum 't Kiekhuus
- Oudheidkamer Weststellingwerf

=== Wommels ===
- De striid tsjin it wetter

=== Workum ===
- Jopie Huisman Museum
- Museum Warkums Erfskip

== Gelderland ==
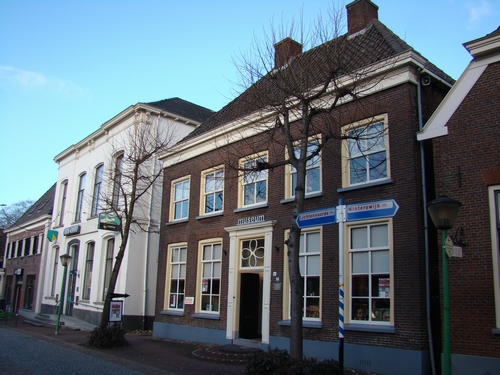
Aalten Museum

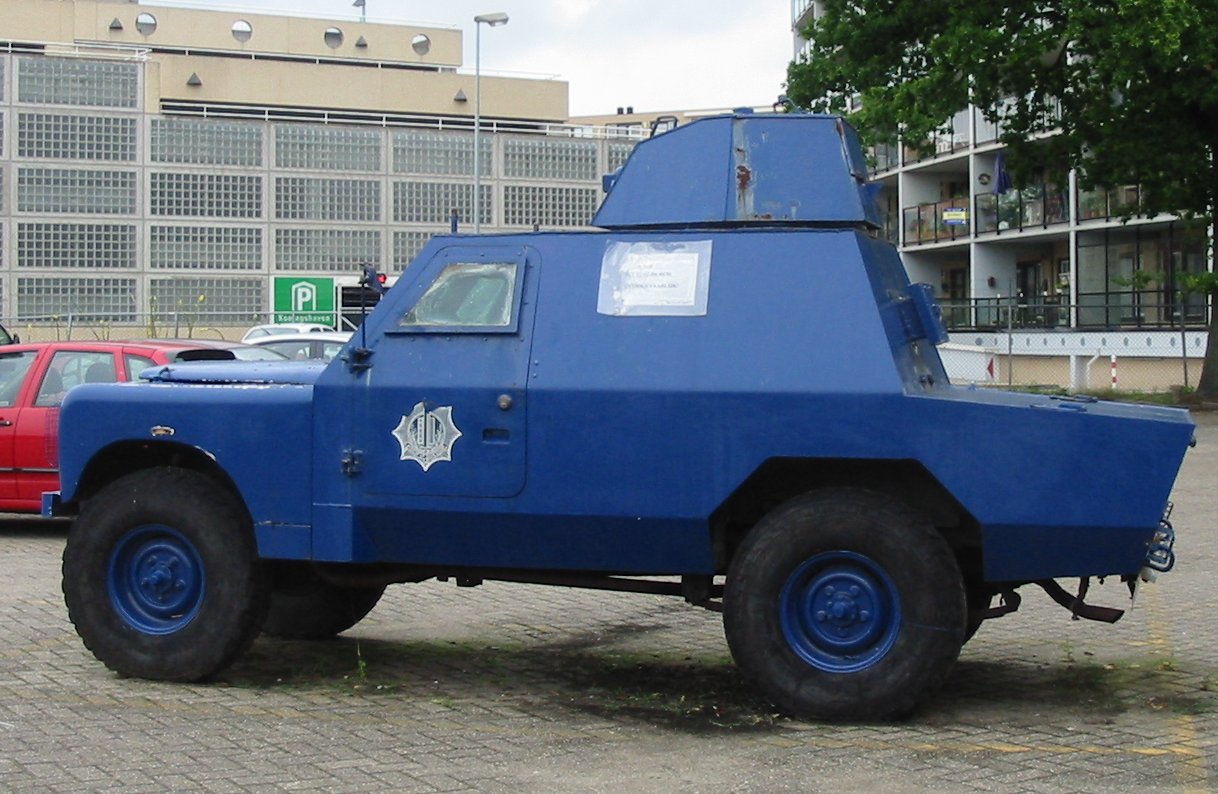
Apeldoorn Nederlands Politiemuseum

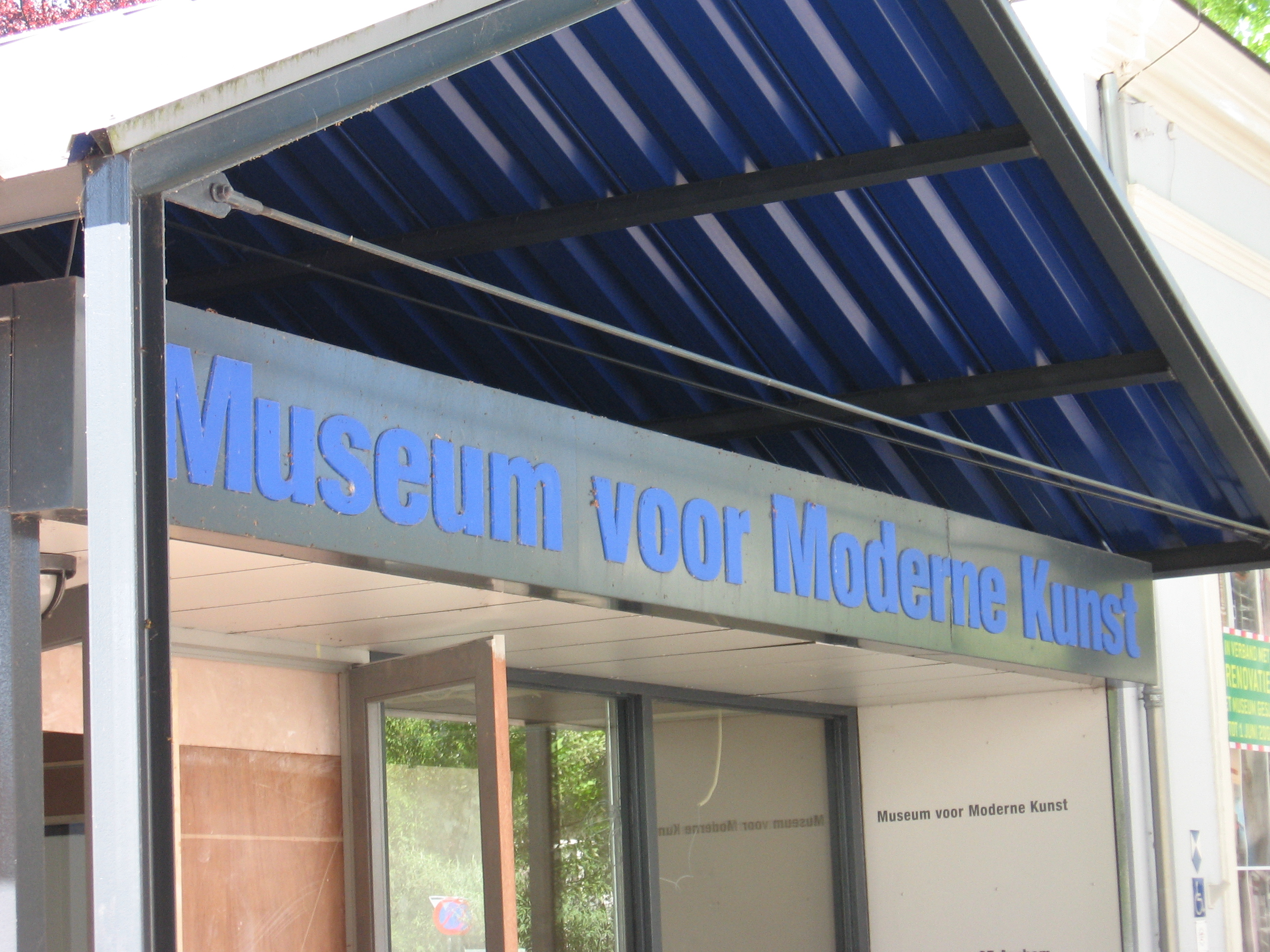
Arnhem Museum voor Moderne Kunst

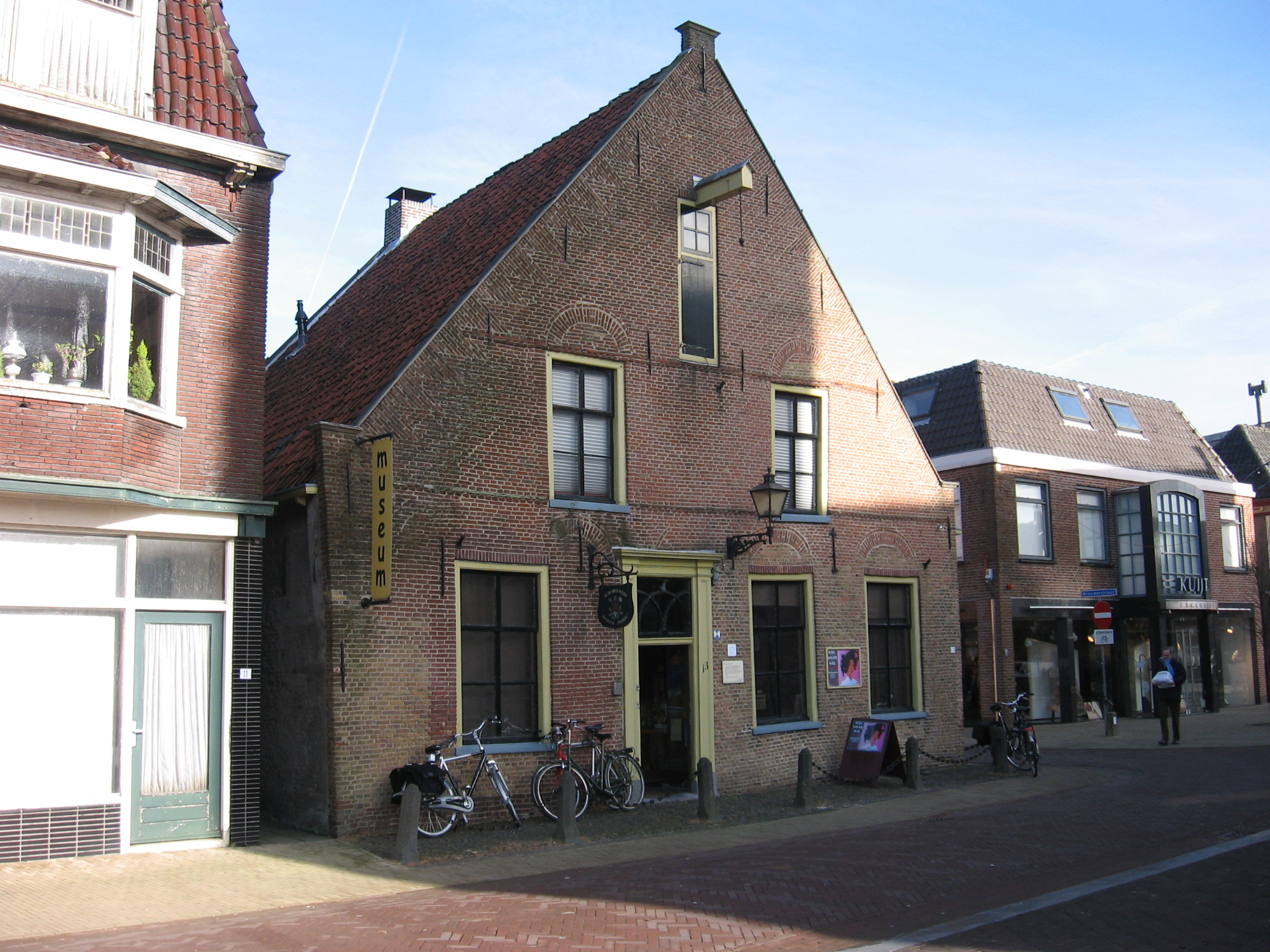
Barneveld Museum Nairac

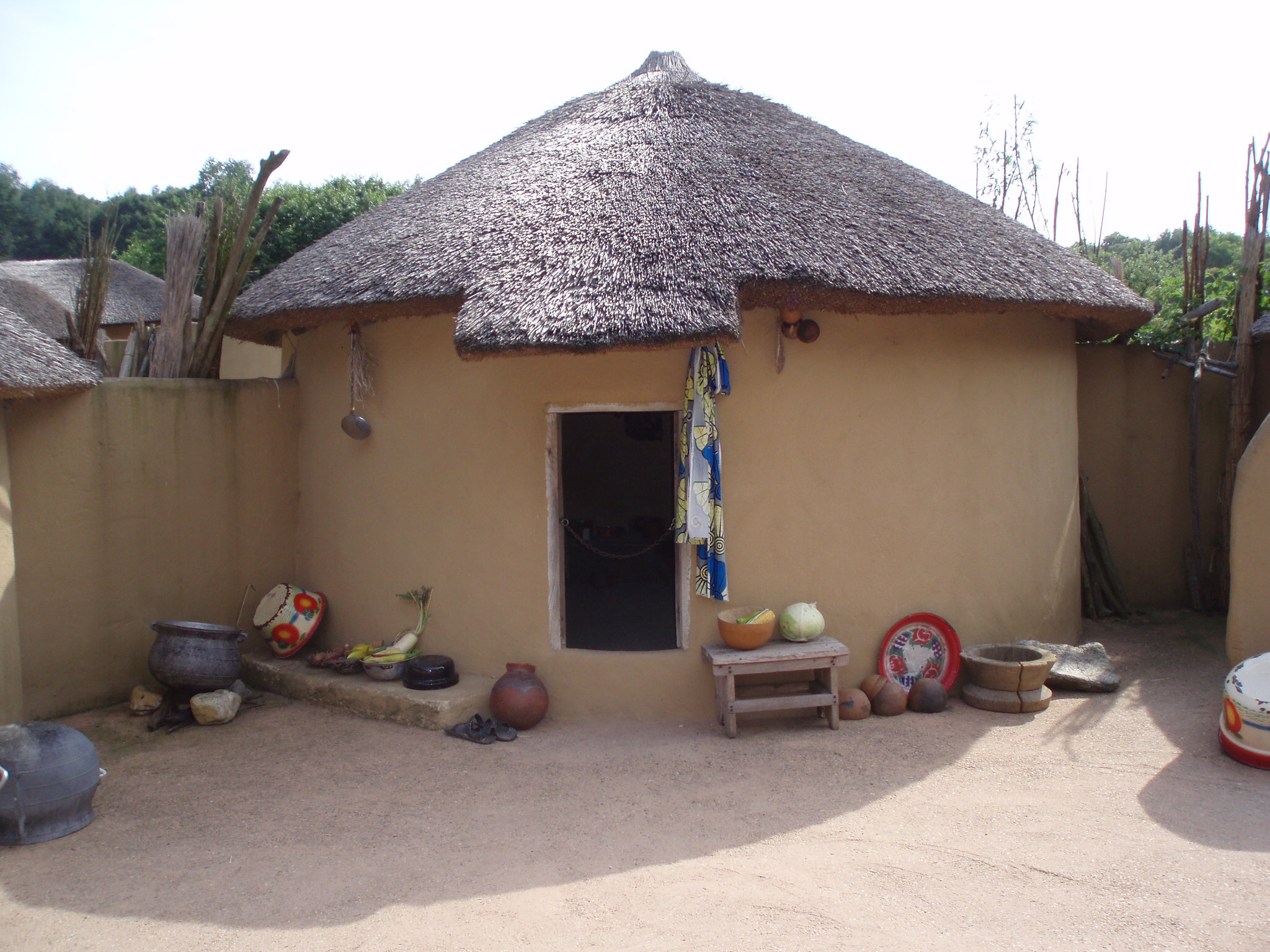
Berg en Dal Afrika Museum

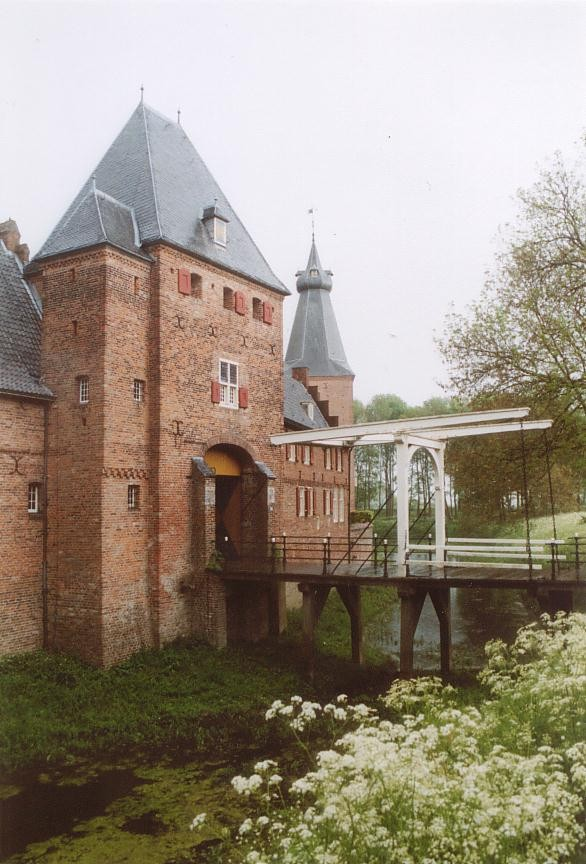
Doorwerth Museumkasteel

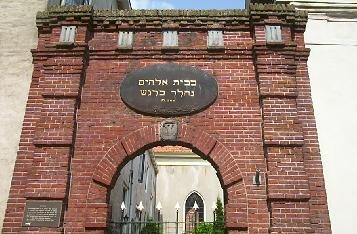
Elburg Sjoel Verhalenmuseum

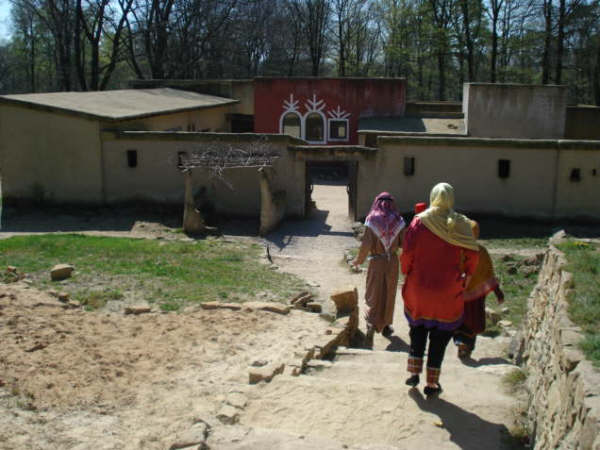
Heilig Landstichting Museumpark Oriëntalis

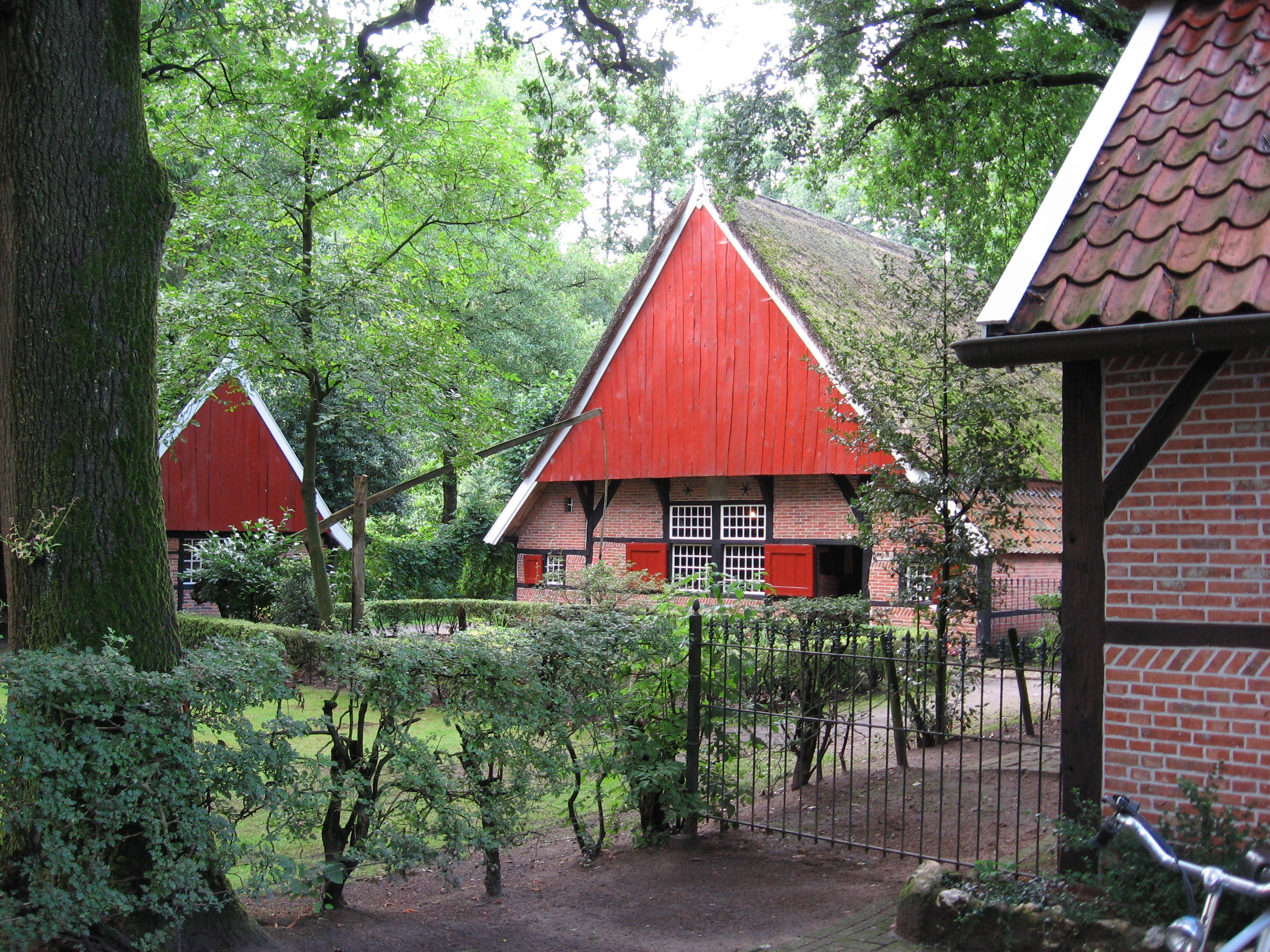
Lievelde Erve Kots Openluchtmuseum

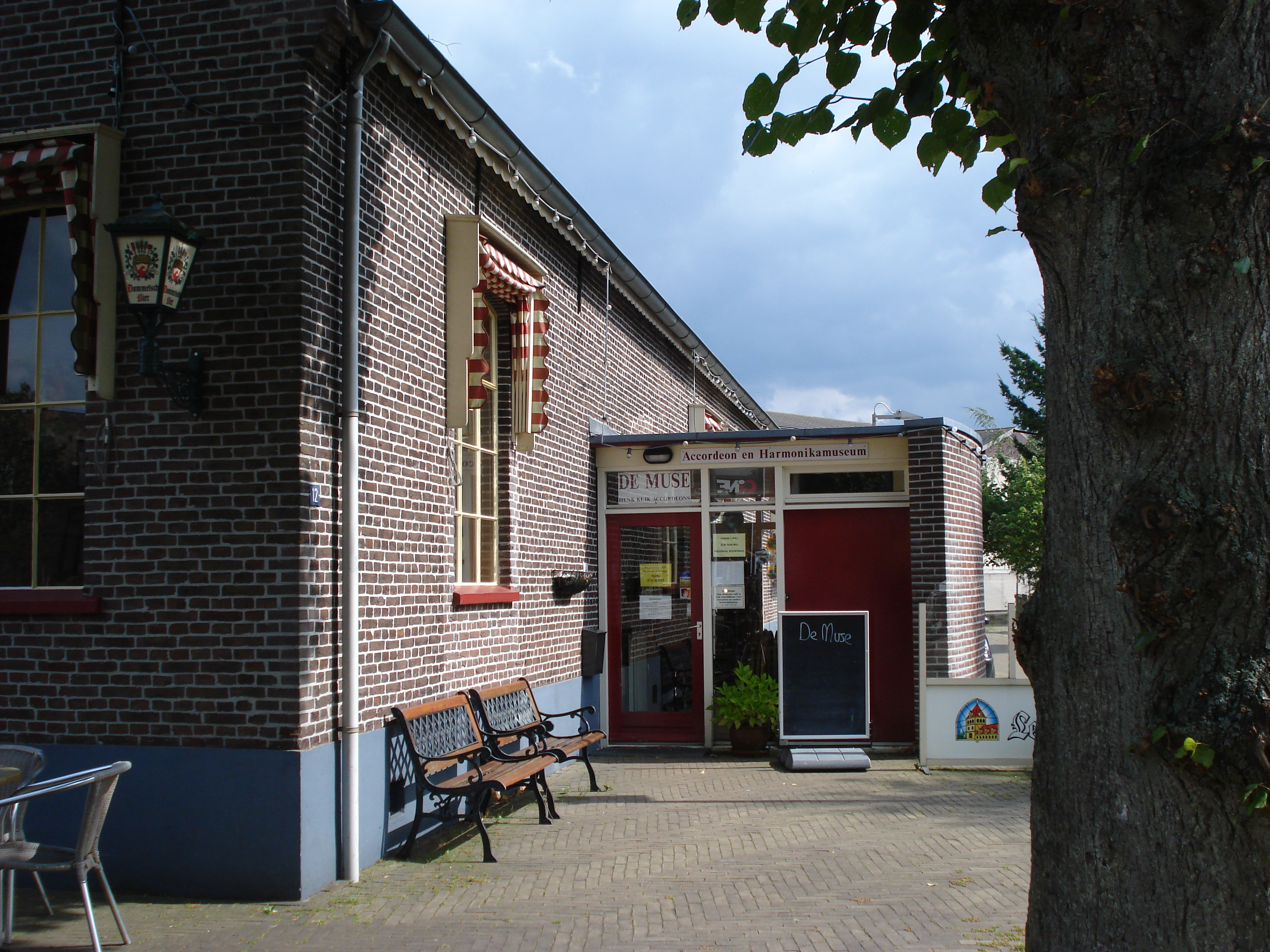
Malden De Muse Accordeon & Harmonicamuseum

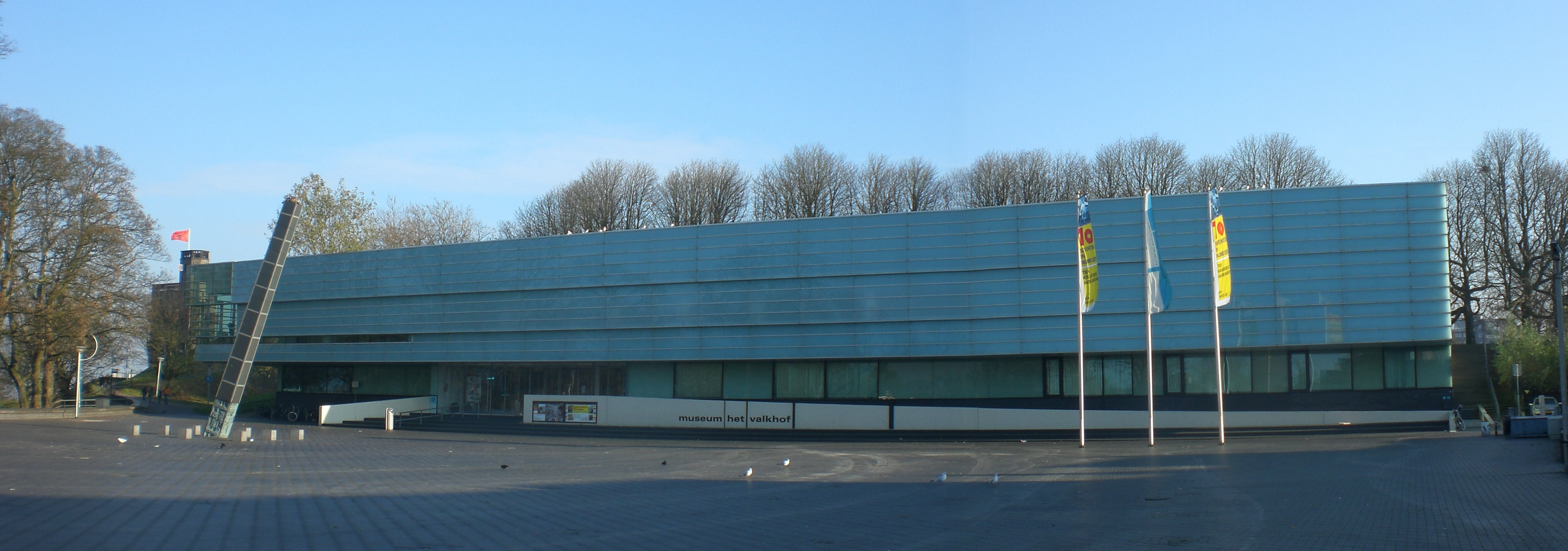
Nijmegen Museum Het Valkhof

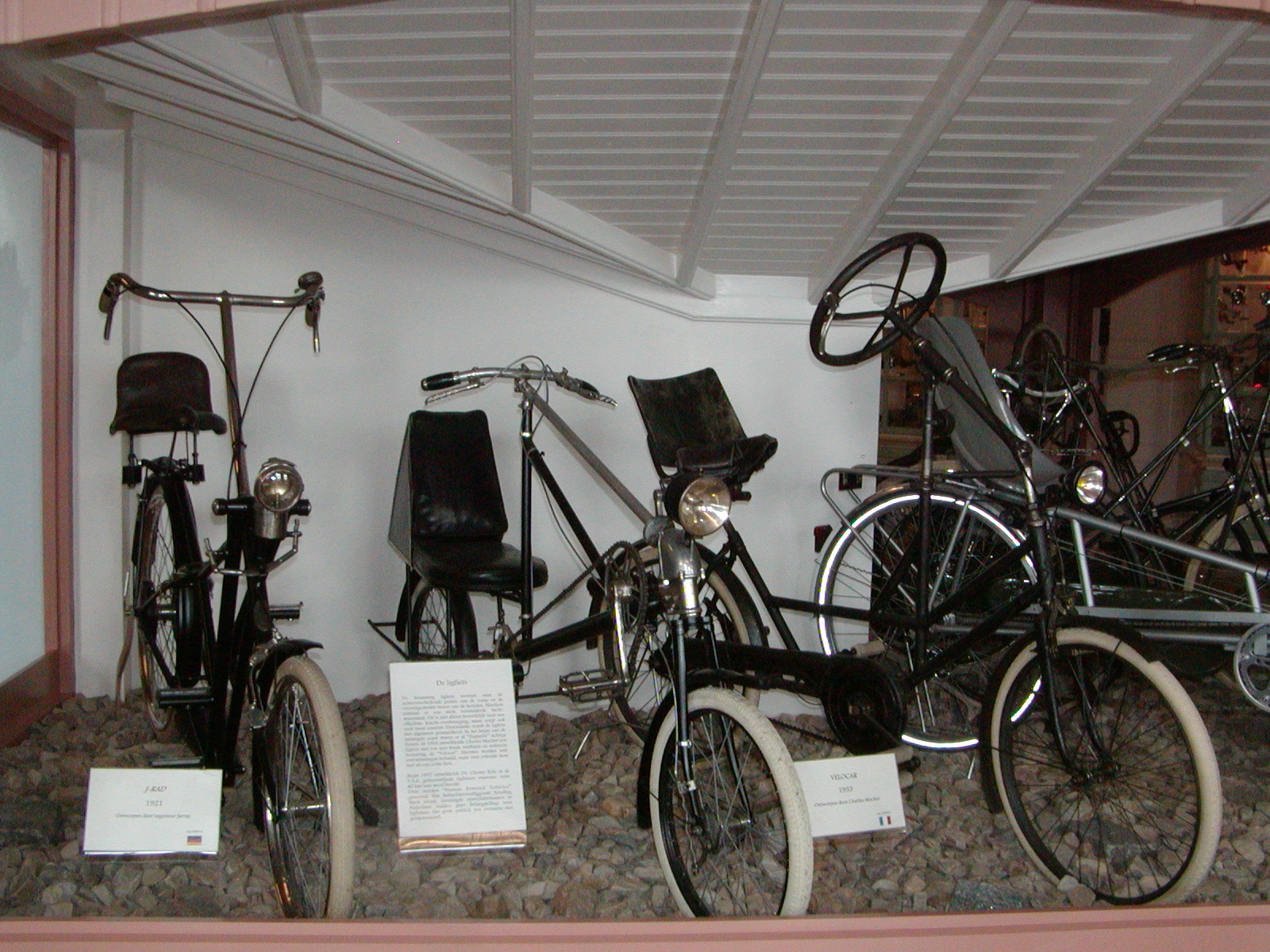
Nijmegen Fietsmuseum Velorama

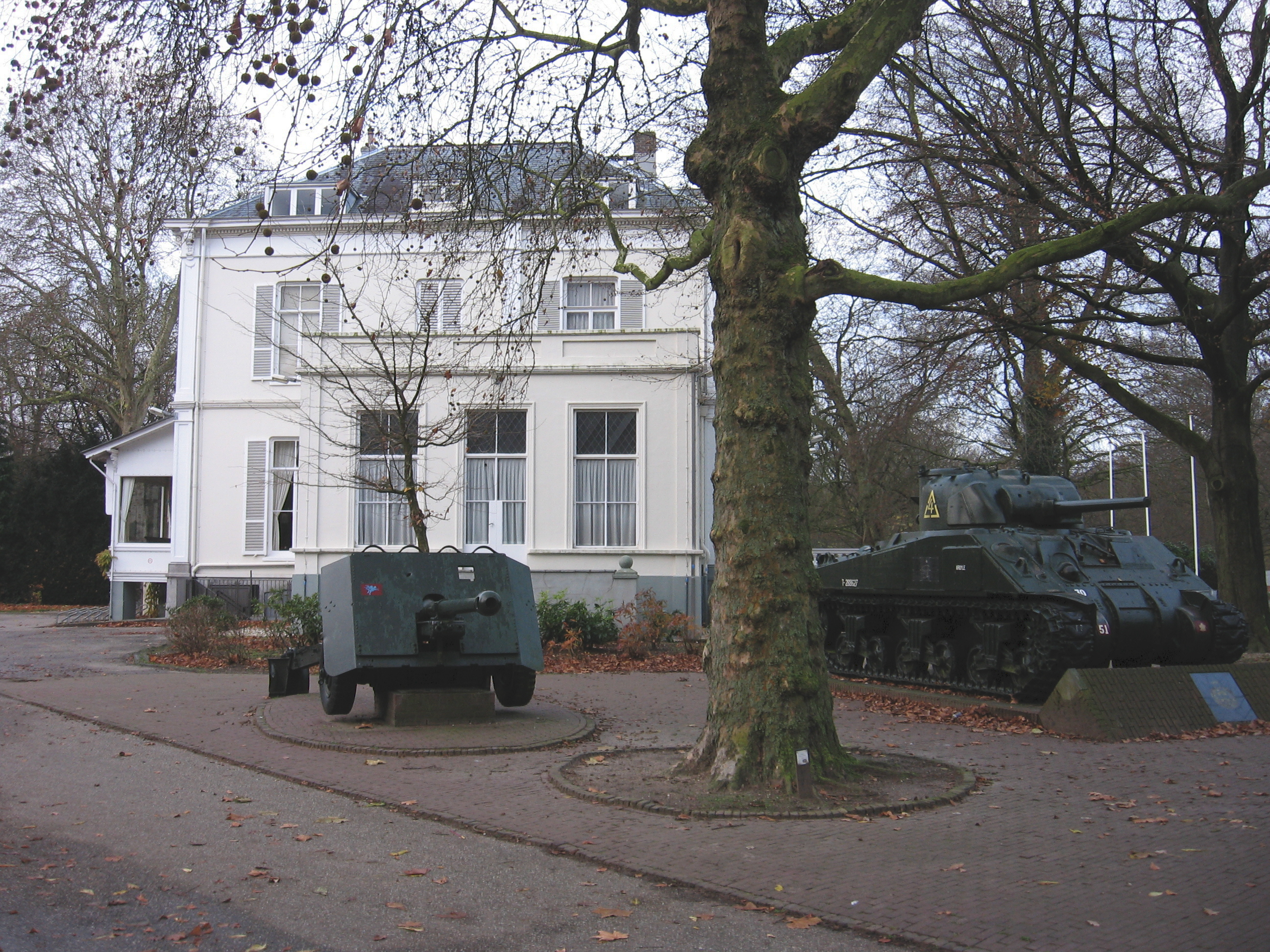
Oosterbeek Airborne Museum

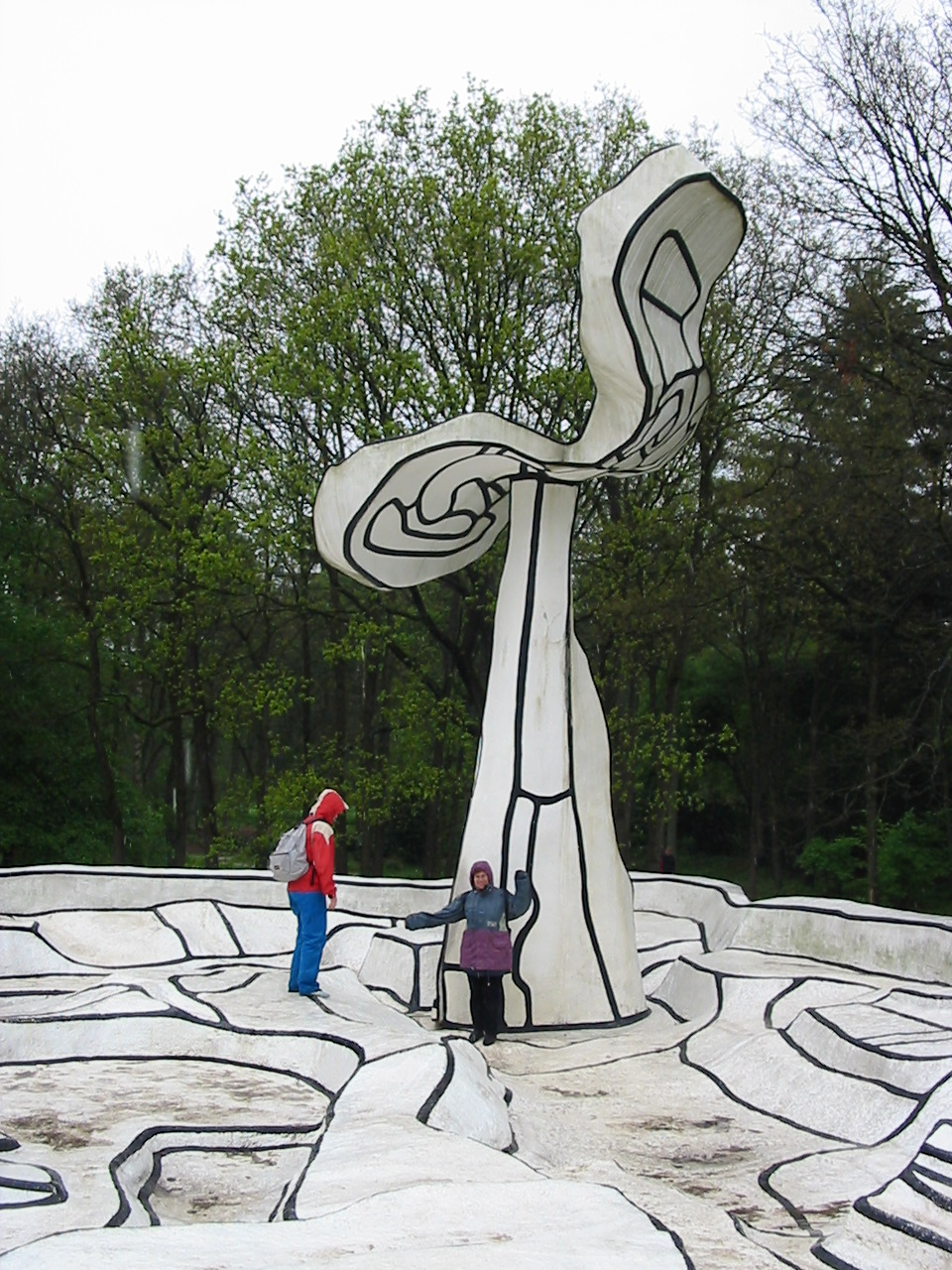
Otterlo Kröller-Müller Museum beeldentuin

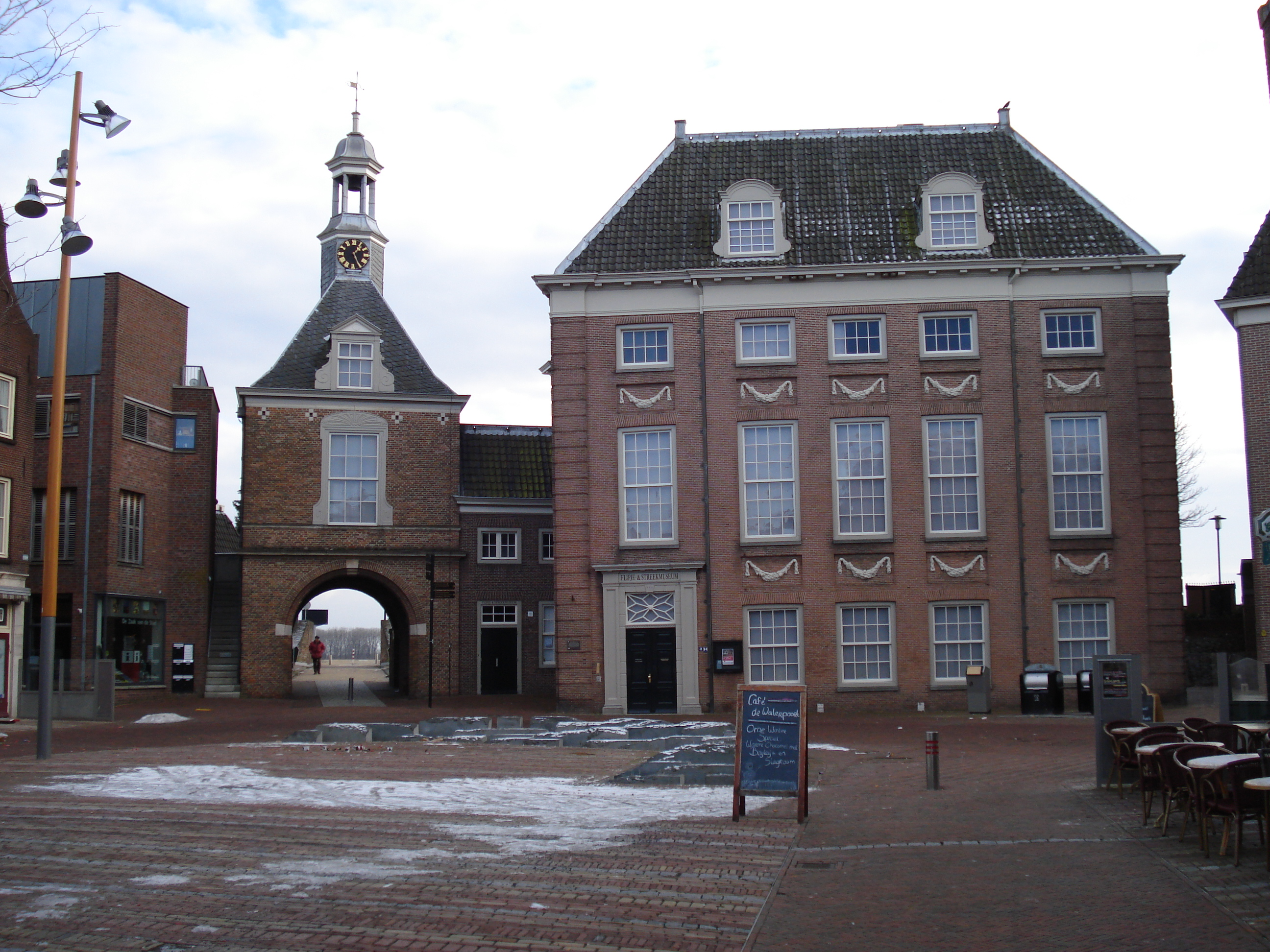
Tiel Waterpoort, Flipje- en Streekmuseum

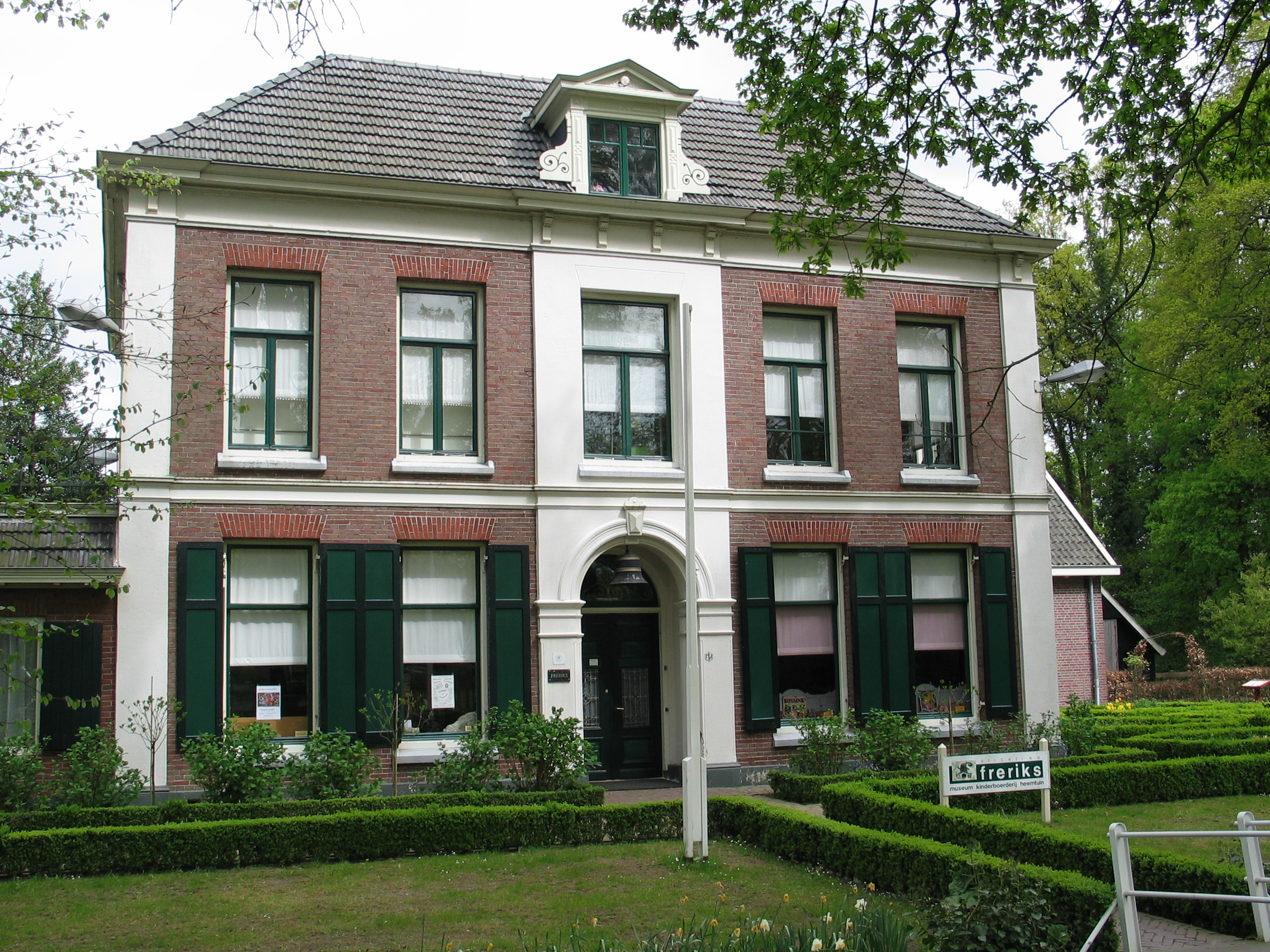
Winterswijk Museum Freriks

=== Aalten ===
- Boerderijmuseum de Neeth
- Markt 12
- Museum Frerikshuus
- Freriksschure

=== Almen ===
- Mosterdmuseum
- Museum voor oude boekdrukkunst

=== Apeldoorn ===
- Nederlands Politiemuseum
- CODA
- Het Loo Palace

=== Appeltern ===
- Stoomgemaal De Tuut

=== Arnhem ===
- Arnhems Oorlogsmuseum 40-45
- Museum Moderne Kunst Arnhem
- Netherlands Open Air Museum
- Historisch Museum Arnhem
- Nederlands Watermuseum
- Nederlands Wijnmuseum

=== Asperen ===
- Het Minidome

=== Barneveld ===
- Museum Nairac
- Nederlands Pluimveemuseum
- Oude Ambachten & Speelgoed Museum

=== Beneden-Leeuwen ===
- Museum Tweestromenland

=== Bennekom ===
- Kijk & Luistermuseum

=== Berg en Dal ===
- Afrika museum

=== Borculo ===
- Brandweermuseum Borculo
- Kristalmuseum
- Museum 'De Bezinning 1940-45'
- Museumboerderij De Lebbenberg
- Radio Museum Borculo

=== Bronkhorst ===
- Dickens Museum

=== Buren ===
- Museum der Koninklijke Marechaussee
- Museum 'Buren & Oranje'
- Museum De Boerenwagen

=== Culemborg ===
- Gispen
- Elvis Presley Museum
- Elisabeth Weeshuis museum

=== Didam ===
- Gelders Schuttersmuseum

=== Dinxperlo ===
- Grenslandmuseum

=== Doesburg ===
- Mosterdmuseum
- Streekmuseum De Roode Toren

=== Doetinchem ===
- Openbaar Vervoer Museum
- Stadsmuseum Doetinchem

=== Doorwerth ===
- Kasteel Doorwerth
- Museum voor Natuur- en Wildbeheer
- Museum Veluwezoom

=== Ede ===
- Historisch Museum Ede

=== Elburg ===
- Sjoel Elburg Verhalenmuseum
- Museum Elburg
- Nationaal Hist. Orgelmuseum

=== Epe ===
- Veluws Streekmuseum

=== Erichem ===
- Betuws Fruitteelt Museum

=== Groenlo ===
- Brouwerijmuseum

=== Groesbeek ===
- Nationaal Bevrijdingsmuseum 1944-1945

=== Harderwijk ===
- Stadsmuseum Harderwijk

=== Hattem ===
- Anton Pieck Museum
- Bakkerijmuseum Het Warme Land
- Voerman Museum Hattem

=== Hedel ===
- Historisch Museum Hedel

=== Heilig Landstichting ===
- Museumpark Orientalis

=== Hengelo ===
- Achterhoeks Museum 1940-1945

=== Heteren ===
- Gelderse Smalspoor Stichting

=== Heumen ===
- Ateliermuseum Maris Huis

=== Hoenderloo ===
- Electriciteitsmuseum + Radiotron

=== Hoog Soeren ===
- Wildpark Het Aardhuis

=== Klarenbeek ===
- Haardplatenmuseum

=== Lievelde ===
- Openluchtmuseum Erve Kots

=== Loenen ===
- Papierfabriek de Middelste Molen

=== Malden ===
- Accordeonmuseum De Muse

=== Nijmegen ===
- De Stratemakerstoren (Fortification museum)
- Natuurmuseum Nijmegen
- MuZIEum
- Museum Het Valkhof
- Nationaal Fietsmuseum Velorama
- Museum voor Anatomie & Pathologie
- Revolutiemuseum voor modelvliegtuigen

=== Nunspeet ===
- Noord-Veluws Museum

=== Oosterbeek ===
- Airborne Museum

=== Otterlo ===
- Kröller-Müller Museum

=== Terschuur ===
- Oude Ambachten & Speelgoed Museum

=== Tiel ===
- Flipje- & Streekmuseum Tiel

=== Velp ===
- Gelders Geologisch Museum

=== Vorchten ===
- Poppenspelmuseum

=== Wageningen ===
- Museum de Casteelse Poort
- Sculpture Gallery Het Depot
- Herman Brood Museum (exposition location closed, now called HB-M)
- World Soil Museum

=== Warnsveld ===
- Cultuurhistorisch Museum

=== Wijchen ===
- Museum Kasteel Wijchen

=== Winterswijk ===
- Museum Freriks

=== Zaltbommel ===
- Maarten van Rossum Museum

=== Zelhem ===
- Museum Smedekinck

=== Zetten ===
- Museum Verpleging en Verzorging

=== Zevenaar ===
- Baksteen/dakpanmuseum
- Liemers Museum

=== Zutphen ===
- Grafisch Museum
- Museum Henriette Polak
- Stedelijk Museum Zutphen

== Groningen ==
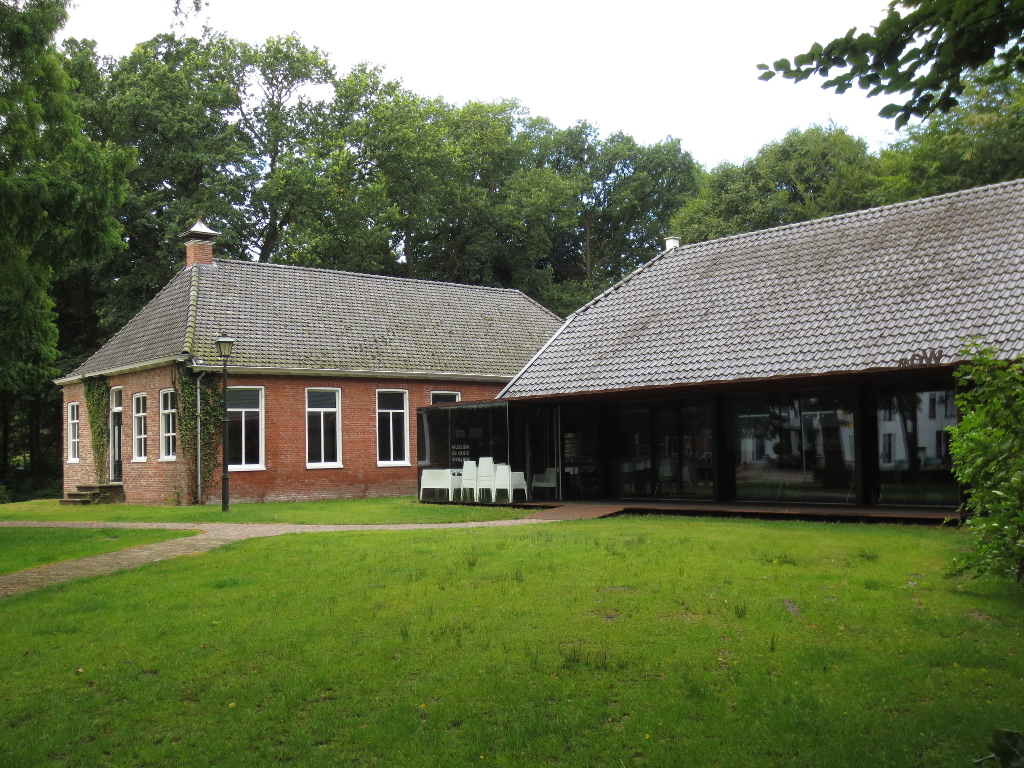
Museum de Oude Wolden in Bellingwolde

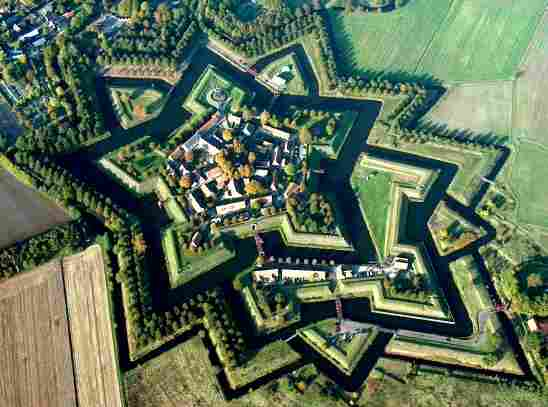
Fort Bourtange in Bourtange

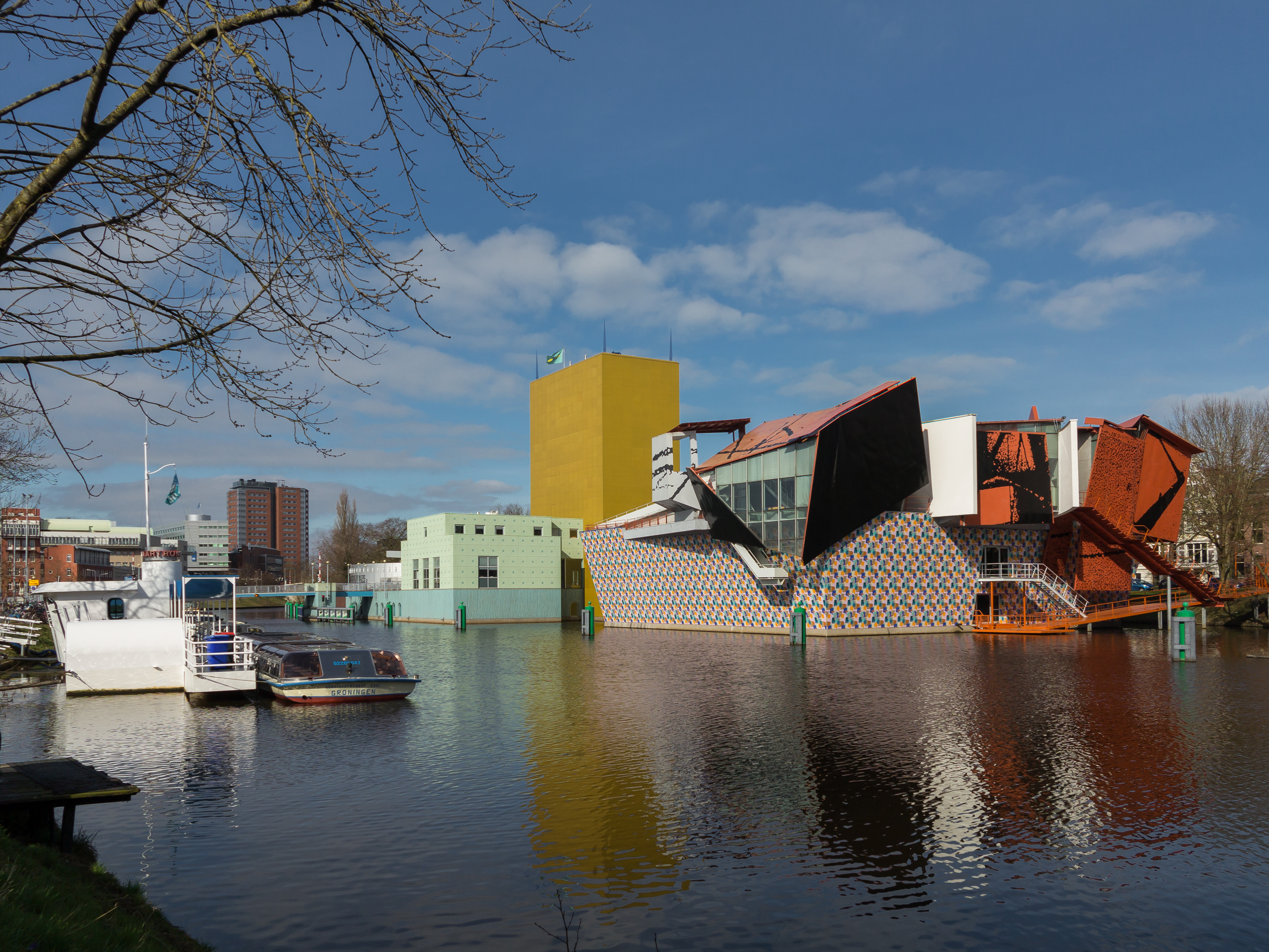
Groninger Museum in Groningen

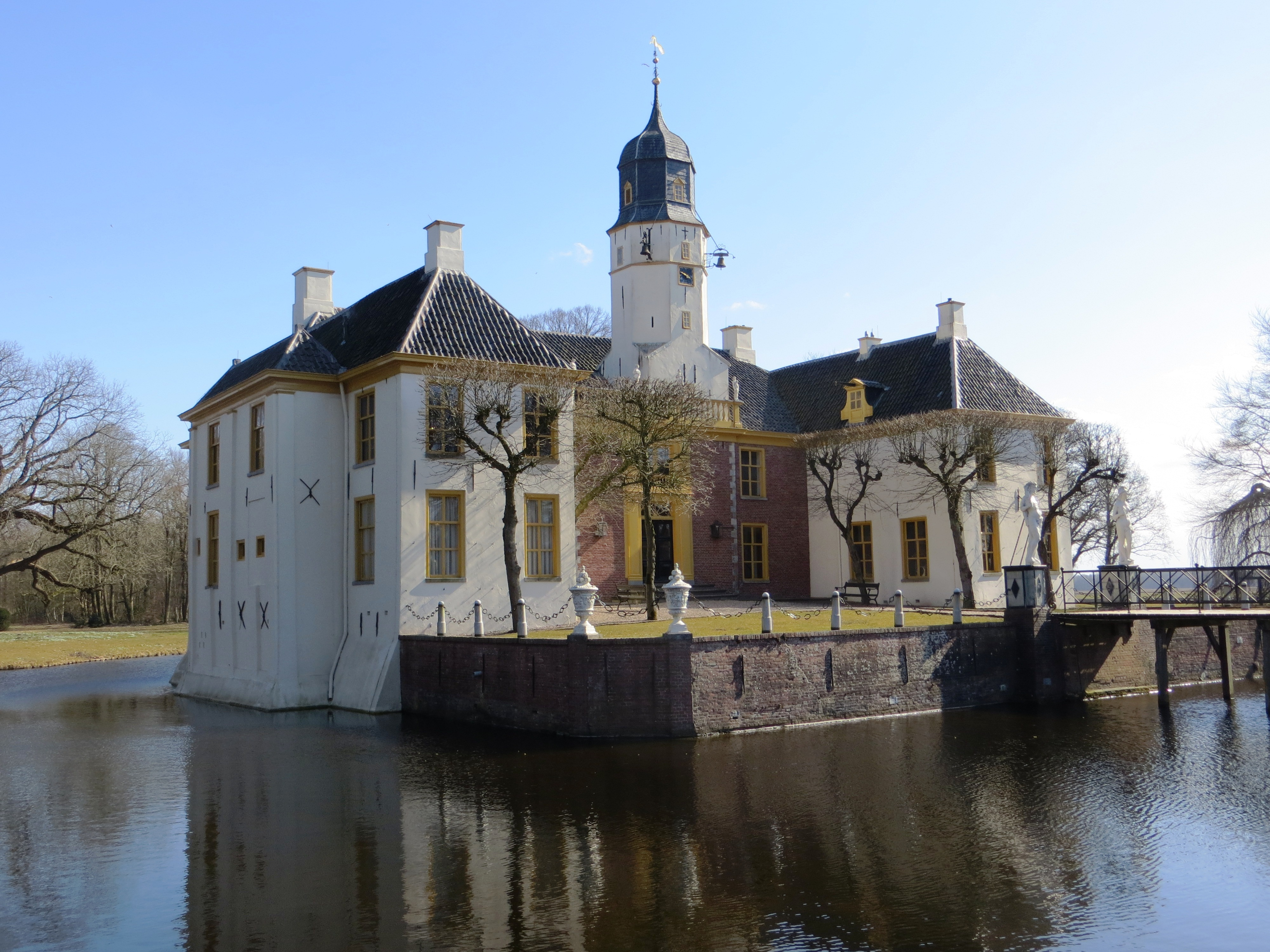
Fraeylemaborg in Slochteren

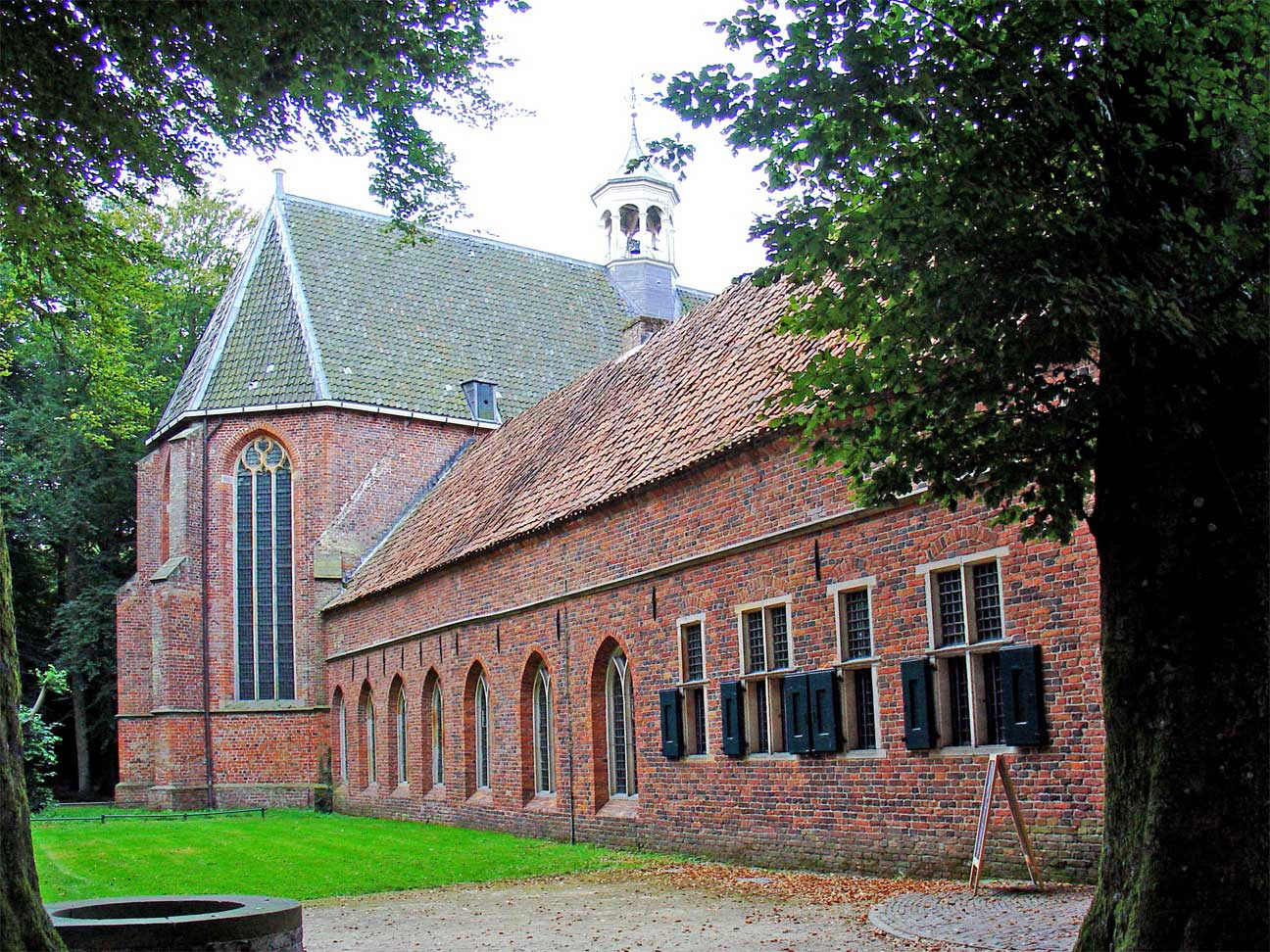
Ter Apel Monastery in Ter Apel

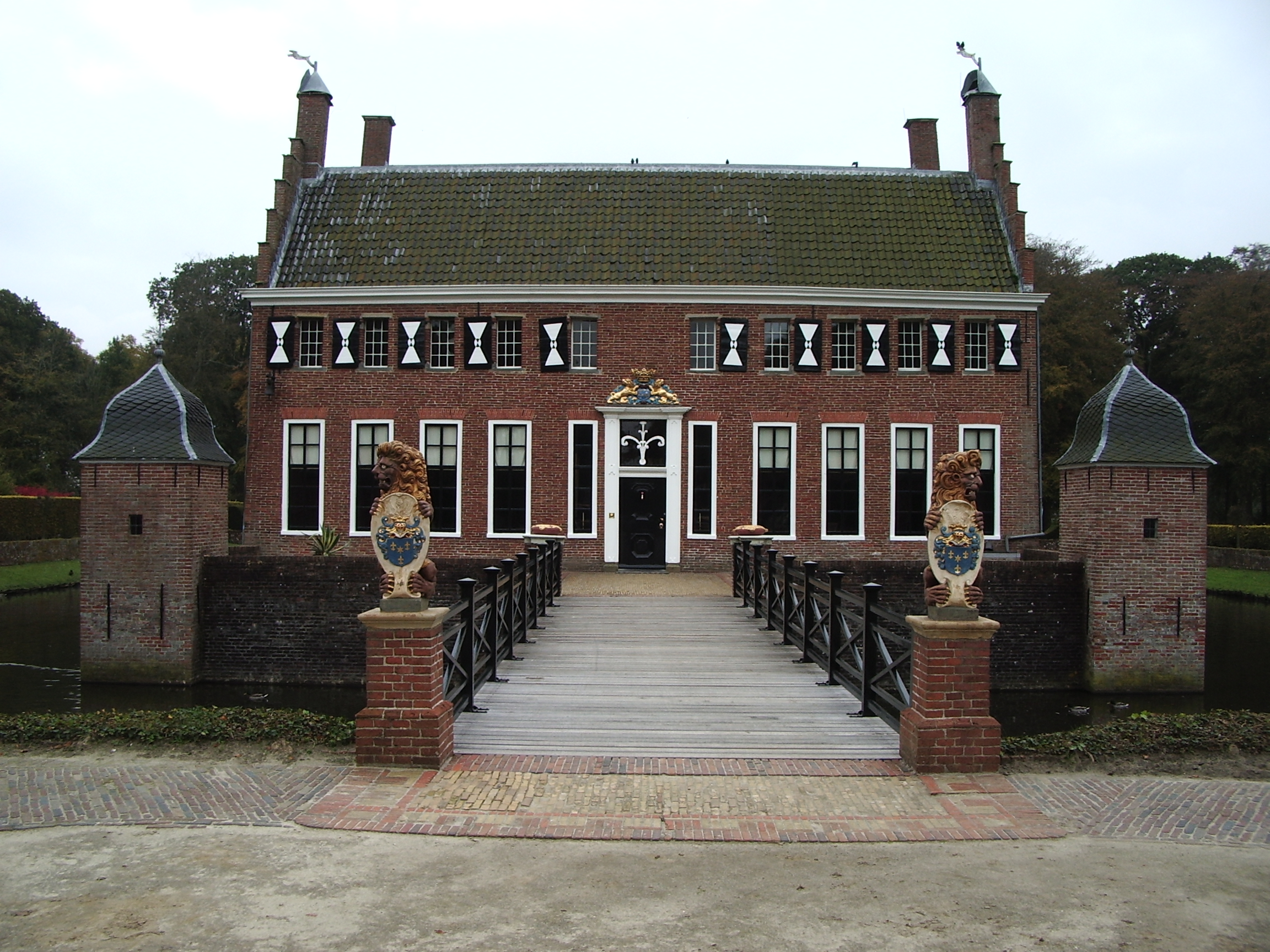
Menkemaborg in Uithuizen

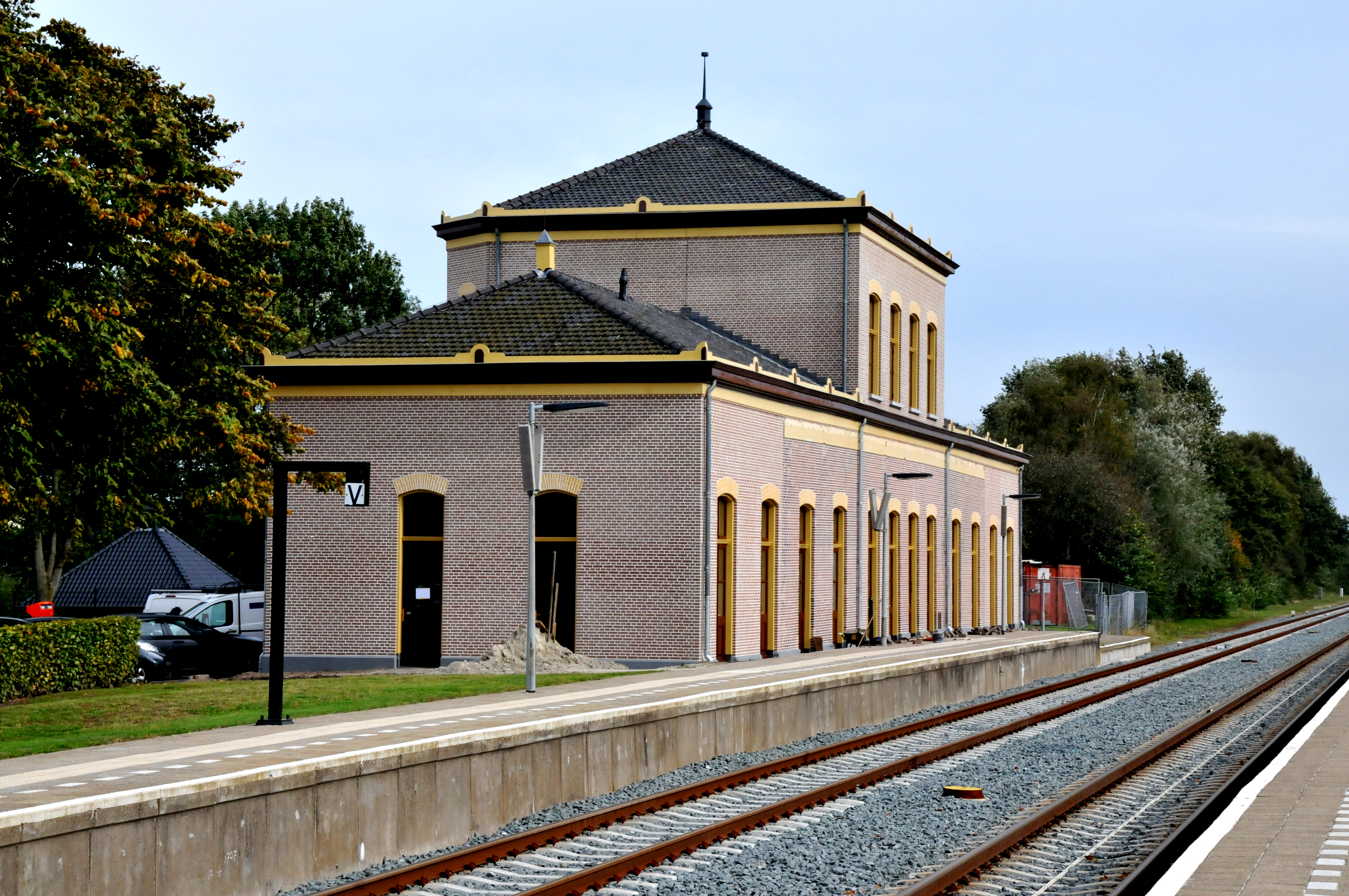
Noord-Nederlands Trein & Tram Museum in Zuidbroek

=== Aduard ===
- Museum Sint Bernardushof

=== Appingedam ===
- Museum Stad Appingedam

=== Bad Nieuweschans ===
- Vestingmuseum Nieuweschans

=== Bellingwolde ===
- Ambachtelijk Zadelmakerij Museum
- Museum de Oude Wolden

=== Blijham ===
- Poppentheater-museum

=== Borgercompagnie ===
- Museum Lammert Boerma

=== Bourtange ===
- De Baracquen
- Fort Bourtange

=== Delfzijl ===
- Museum De Steenfabriek
- Muzeeaquarium Delfzijl

=== Eenrum ===
- Abraham's Mosterdmakerij

=== Ezinge ===
- Museum Wierdenland

=== Groningen ===
- Grafisch Museum Groningen
- Groninger Museum
- Museum Canadian Allied Forces
- Natuurmuseum Groningen (Closed in 2008; collection partly in Universiteitsmuseum Groningen)
- Nederlands Stripmuseum
- Niemeyer Tabaksmuseum (Closed at 1 January 2011)
- Noordelijk Scheepvaartmuseum
- University museum Groningen
- Volkenkundig museum 'Gerardus van der Leeuw' (Closed in 2003; collection partly in Universiteitsmuseum Groningen)

=== Harkstede ===
- Museum '40-'45 (eerder in Slochteren)

=== Heiligerlee ===
- Klokkengieterijmuseum
- Museum Slag bij Heiligerlee

=== Houwerzijl ===
- De Theefabriek

=== Kloosterburen ===
- Oldtimermuseum De Ronkel

=== Kropswolde ===
- Museum voor Handwerktuigen Station Kropswolde

=== Leek ===
- Nationaal Rijtuigmuseum
- Museum Joods Schooltje

=== Leens ===
- Museumboerderij Welgelegen (Museum voor Landbouw en Ambacht)
- Landgoed Verhildersum
- NatuurDoeCentrum Insektenwereld

=== Lutjegast ===
- Abel Tasman Kabinet

=== Middelstum ===
- Museumbakkerij Mendels

=== Midwolda ===
- Museumboerderij Hermans Dijkstra
- Museum voor Oorlogshistorie

=== Niebert ===
- Schilder-en bakkerijmuseum't Steenhuis

=== Nieuwe Pekela ===
- Kapiteinshuis Pekela

=== Nieuwolda ===
- Kinderwagenmuseum
- Museumgemaal de Hoogte

=== Niezijl ===
- Blik Trommel en Oudheden Museum

=== Noordbroek ===
- Aardewerkmuseum Petrus Regout
- Gereedschapmuseum De Hobbyzolder
- Nederlands Strijkijzer-Museum
- Ot & Sien Museum

=== Noordhorn ===
- Kostuummuseum De Gouden Leeuw

=== Nuis ===
- Landbouwmuseum 't Rieuw (achter Coendersborg)

=== Onstwedde ===
- Radio & Speelgoed Museum
- Slaait'nhoes (museum/herberg)

=== Oude Pekela ===
- Museum 't Waschhuuske

=== Oudeschans ===
- Vestingmuseum Oudeschans

=== Pieterburen ===
- Koffie- en winkelmuseum

=== Sappemeer ===
- Groninger Schaatsmuseum

=== Slochteren ===
- Farm museum Duurswold
- Fraeylemaborg
- International Police Caps Collection

=== Stadskanaal ===
- Museum Musica
- Museumspoorlijn S.T.A.R.
- Streekhistorisch Centrum
- Watertoren Stadskanaal

=== Ter Apel ===
- Ter Apel Monastery
- Poppenmuseum

=== Termunterzijl ===
- Museumgemaal Cremer

=== Thesinge ===
- Smederijmuseum Smidshouk

=== Uithuizen ===
- Kantmuseum
- Menkemaborg

=== Uithuizermeeden ===
- Handwerkmuseum
- Het Behouden Blik
- Oudheidkamer

=== Veendam ===
- Veenkoloniaal Museum

=== Warffum ===
- Openluchtmuseum Het Hoogeland
- Museumsmederij

=== Waterhuizen ===
- Spoorwegmuseum Waterhuizen

=== Wedde ===
- Museum voor Naaldkunst

=== Wildervank ===
- Porseleinen Dierenpark

=== Winschoten ===
- Historische Werkplaats Molenmaker Wiertsema
- Museum Stoomgemaal
- Noordelijk Bus Museum

=== Winsum ===
- Stichting Kinderboek-Cultuurbezit

=== Zoutkamp ===
- Rijwiel- en Bromfietsmuseum
- Visserijmuseum Zoutkamp

=== Zuidbroek ===
- Noord-Nederlands Trein & Tram Museum

=== Zuidhorn ===
- Museum De Verzamelaar

=== Zuidwolde ===
- Van der Werf's Wedgwoodmuseum

== Limburg ==
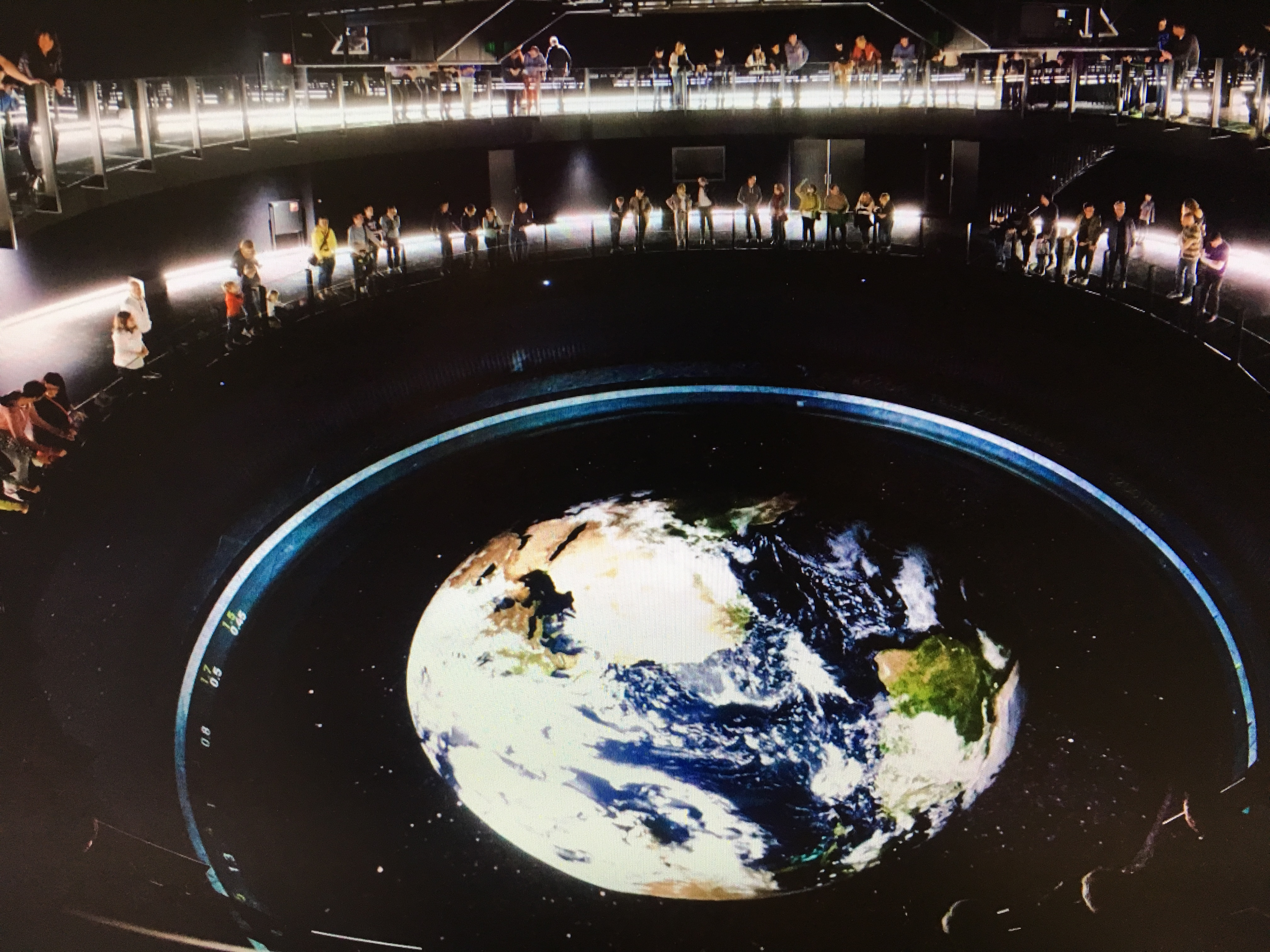
Columbus earth center in Kerkrade

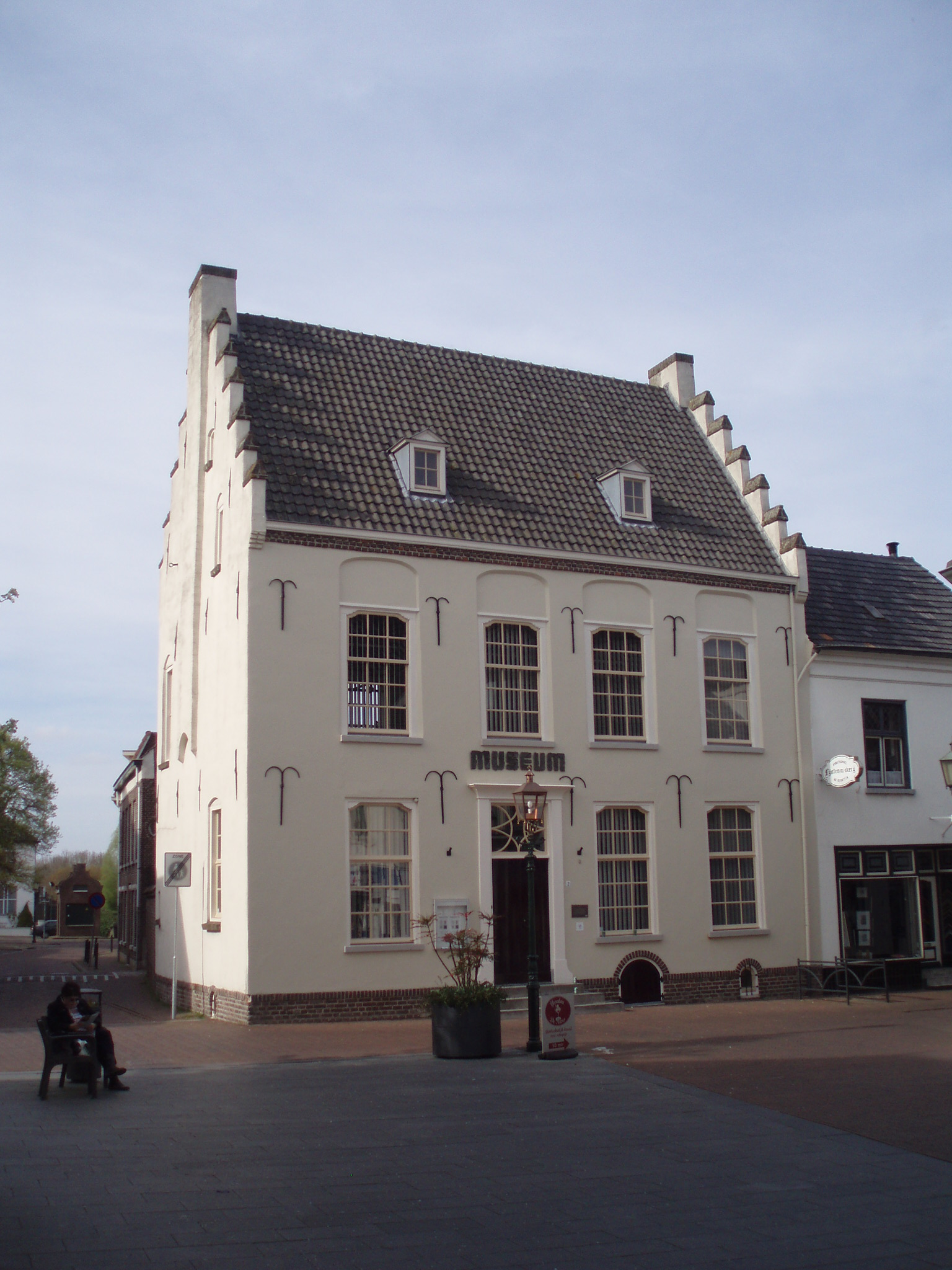
Museum Het Petershuis in Gennep

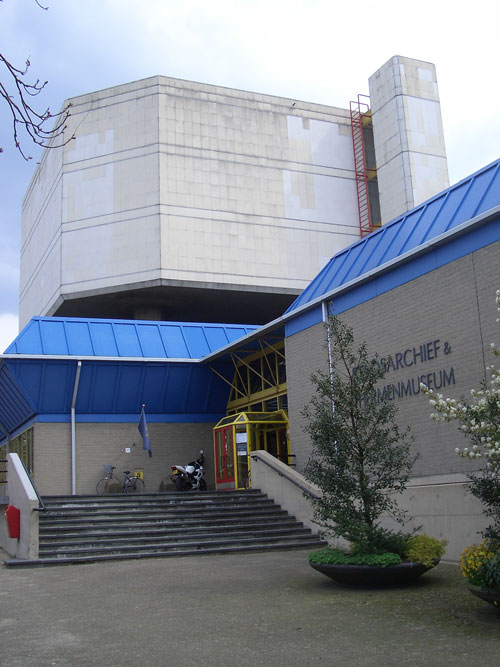
Thermenmuseum in Heerlen

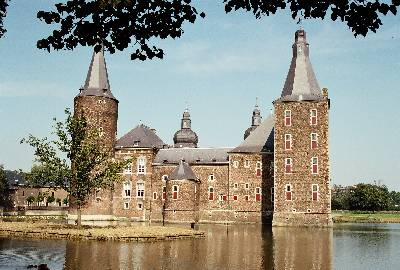
Hoensbroek Castle in Hoensbroek

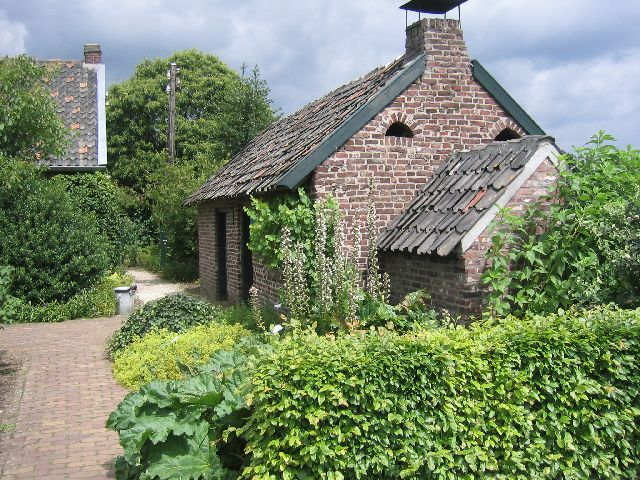
Museum De Locht in Horst-Melderslo

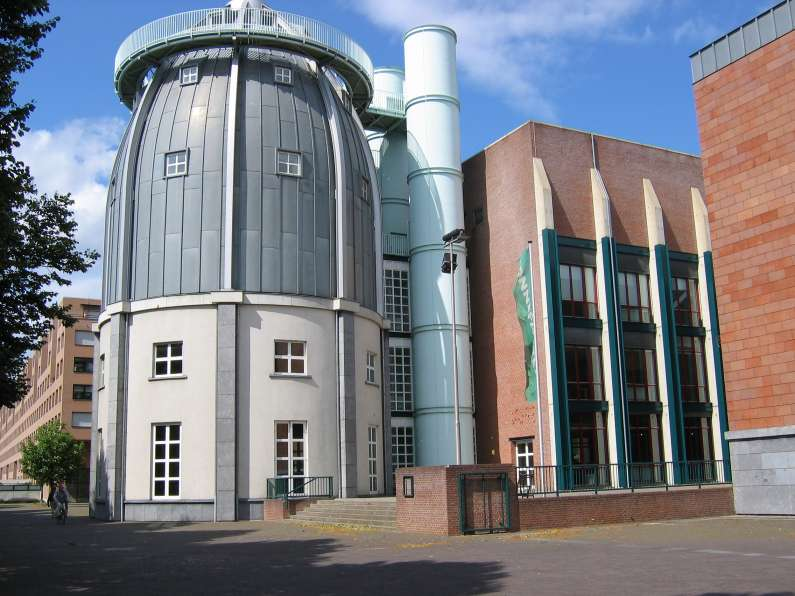
Bonnefanten Museum in Maastricht

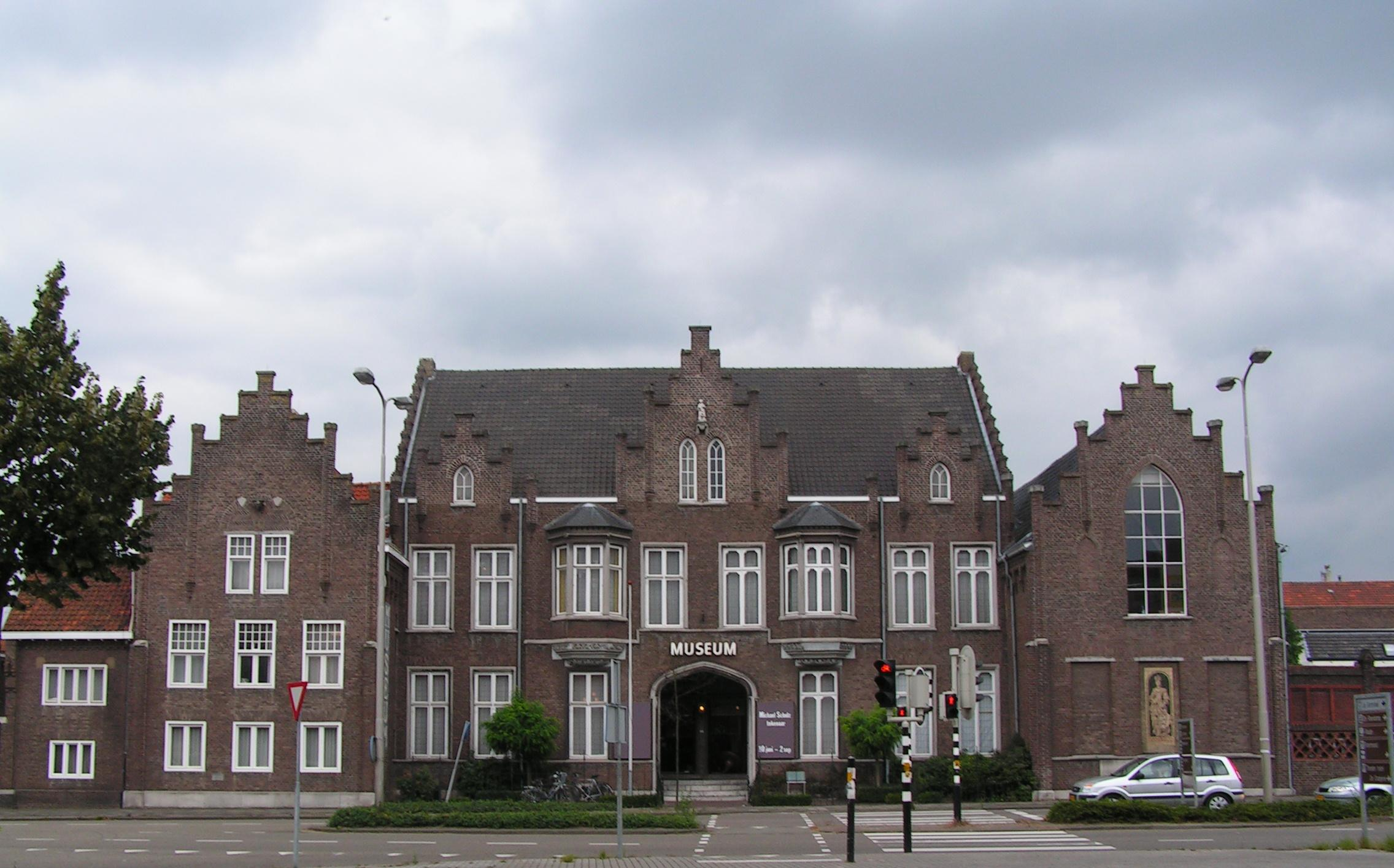
Stedelijk Museum Roermond in Roermond

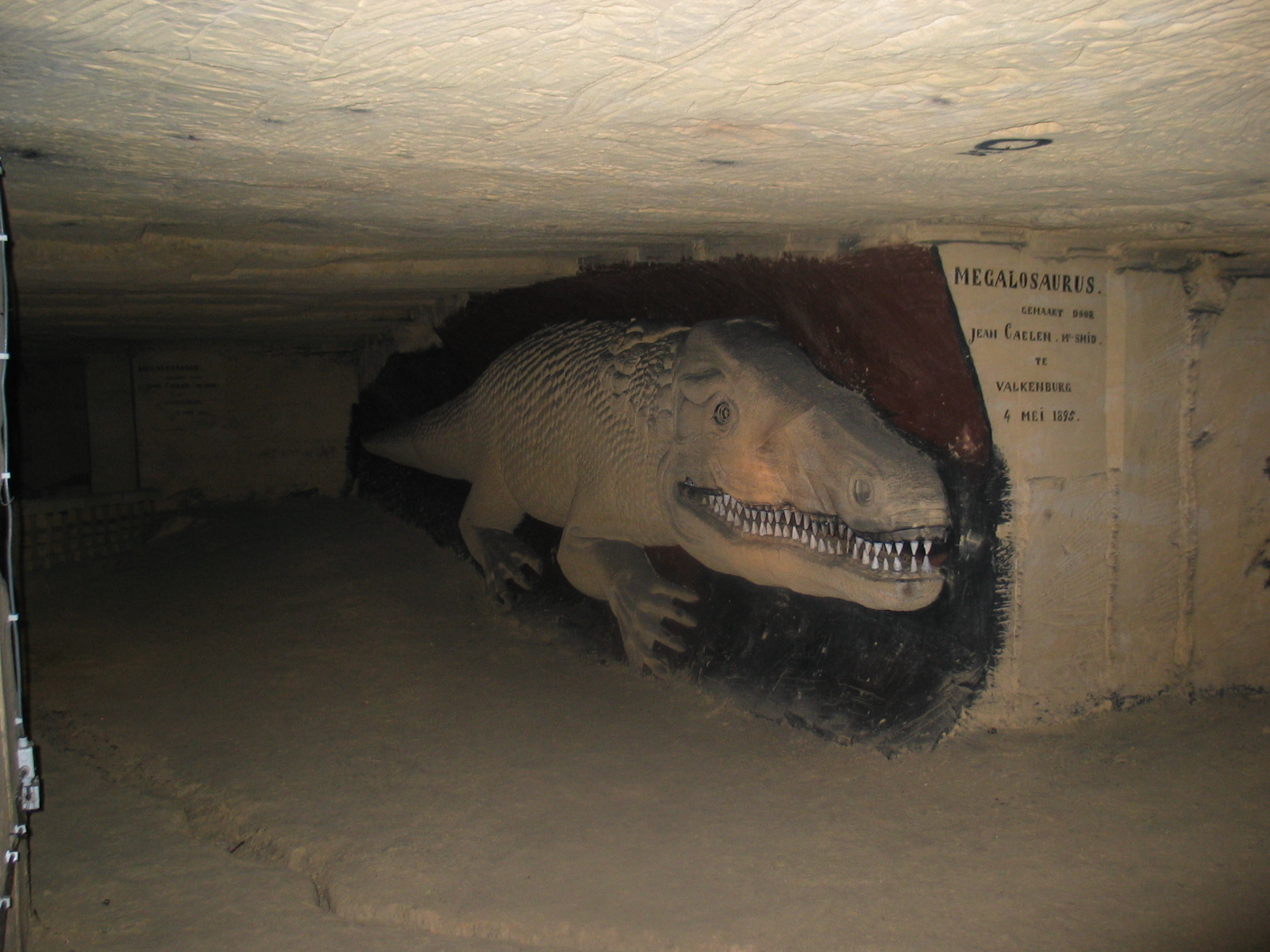
Gemeentegrot in Valkenburg

=== Asselt ===
- Museum Asselt

=== Beek ===
- Els Museum

=== De Peel ===
- Luchtdoelartillerie Museum

=== Echt ===
- M/V Museum van de Vrouw

=== Eijsden ===
- International Museum for Family History

=== Elsloo ===
- Streekmuseum Schippersbeurs

=== Gennep ===
- De Crypte
- Museum Het Petershuis

=== Haelen ===
- Leudalmuseum

=== Heerlen ===
- Thermenmuseum
- Nederlands Mijnmuseum GEON
- Sterrenwacht Limburg
- Stadsgalerij Heerlen

=== Helden ===
- De Moennik

=== Hoensbroek ===
- Museum Kasteel Hoensbroek

=== Horn ===
- Museum "Terug in de tijd"

=== Horst ===
- Koperslagers museum

=== Horst-Melderslo ===
- Openluchtmuseum de Locht

=== Kerkrade ===
- Columbus earth center
- Cube design museum
- Continium discovery center

=== Maastricht ===
- Bonnefantenmuseum
- Museum de Historische Drukkerij
- Museum aan het Vrijthof
- Maastricht Natural History Museum
- NAiM / Bureau Europa
- Treasury of the Basilica of Saint Servatius

=== Nederweert-Eind ===
- Limburgs Openluchtmuseum Eynderhoof

=== Roermond ===
- Stedelijk Museum Roermond

=== Sint Odiliënberg ===
- Roerstreekmuseum

=== Sittard ===
- Het Domein

=== Stein ===
- Archeologie Museum

=== Steyl ===
- Limburgs Schutterij Museum
- Missiemuseum Steyl

=== Tegelen ===
- Ithaka Science Center
- Keramiekcentrum Tiendschuur

=== Thorn ===
- Museum Het Land van Thorn

=== Valkenburg ===
- Modelsteenkolenmijn
- Gemeentegrot
- Streekmuseum
- Kasteelruine & Fluweelengrot

=== Venlo ===
- Limburgs Museum
- Museum van Bommel van Dam

=== Venray ===
- Freulekeshuus, 't
- Odapark

=== Weert ===
- Museum Weert

== North Brabant ==
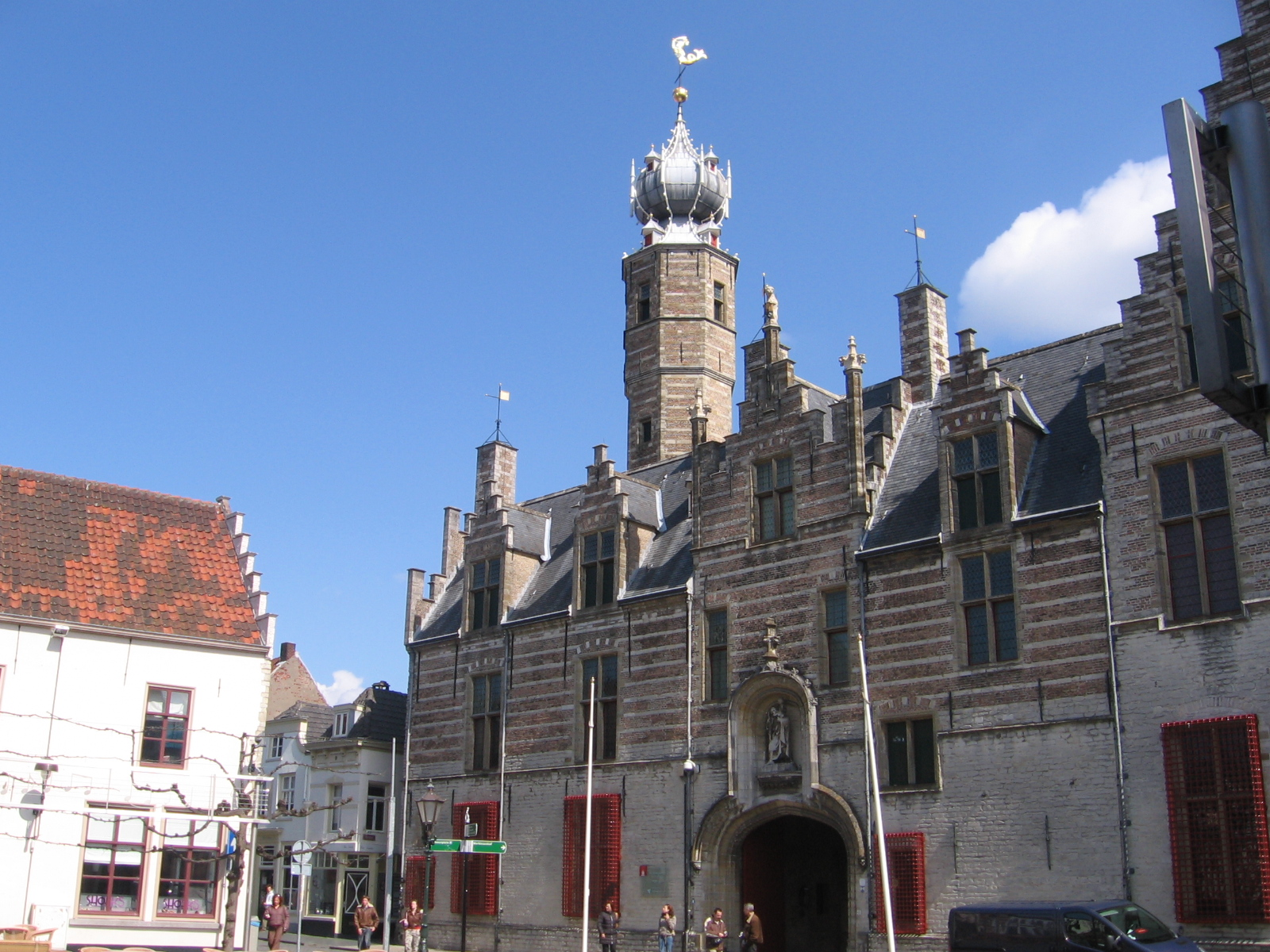
Markiezenhof

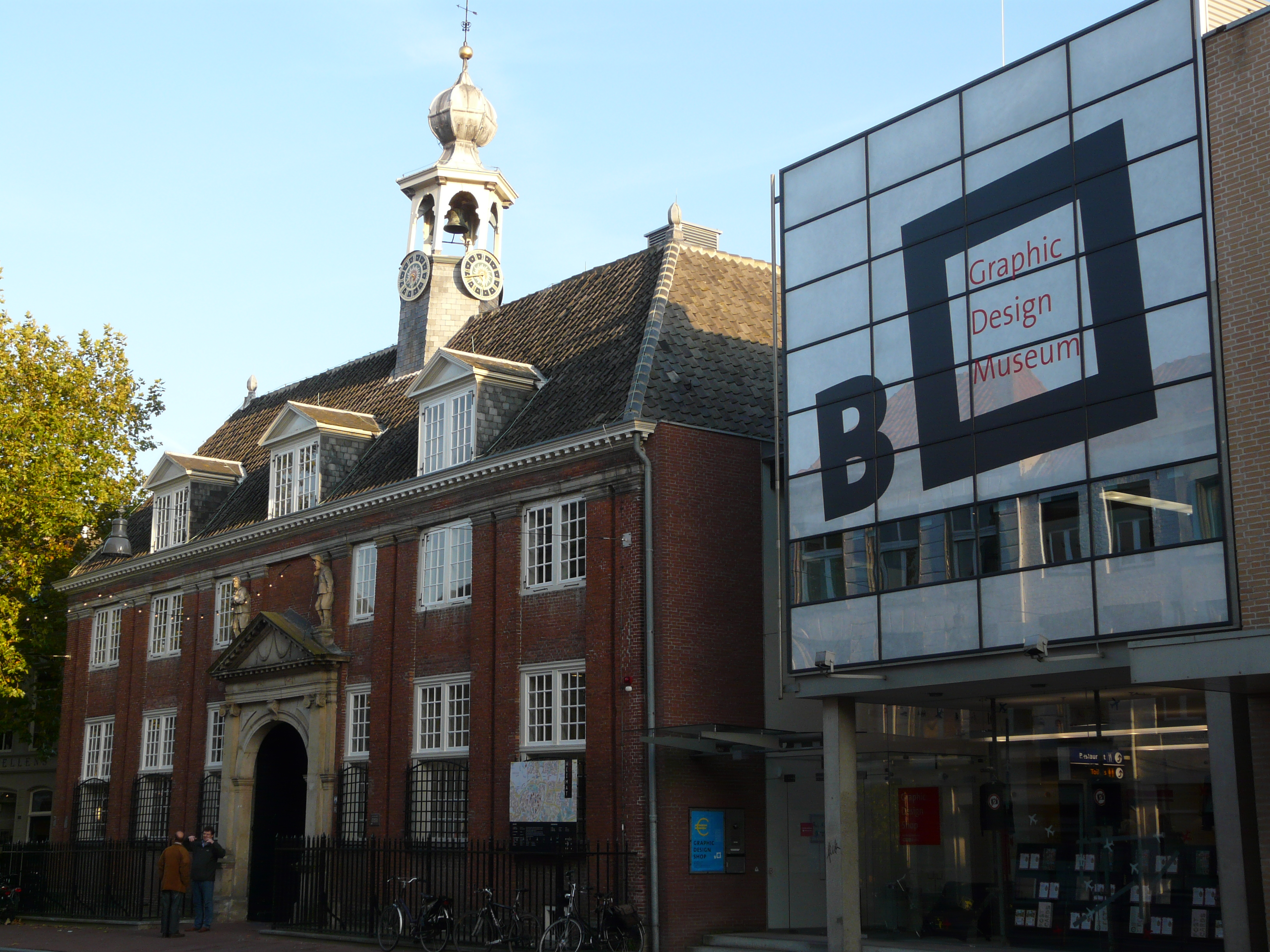
Breda Graphic Design Museum

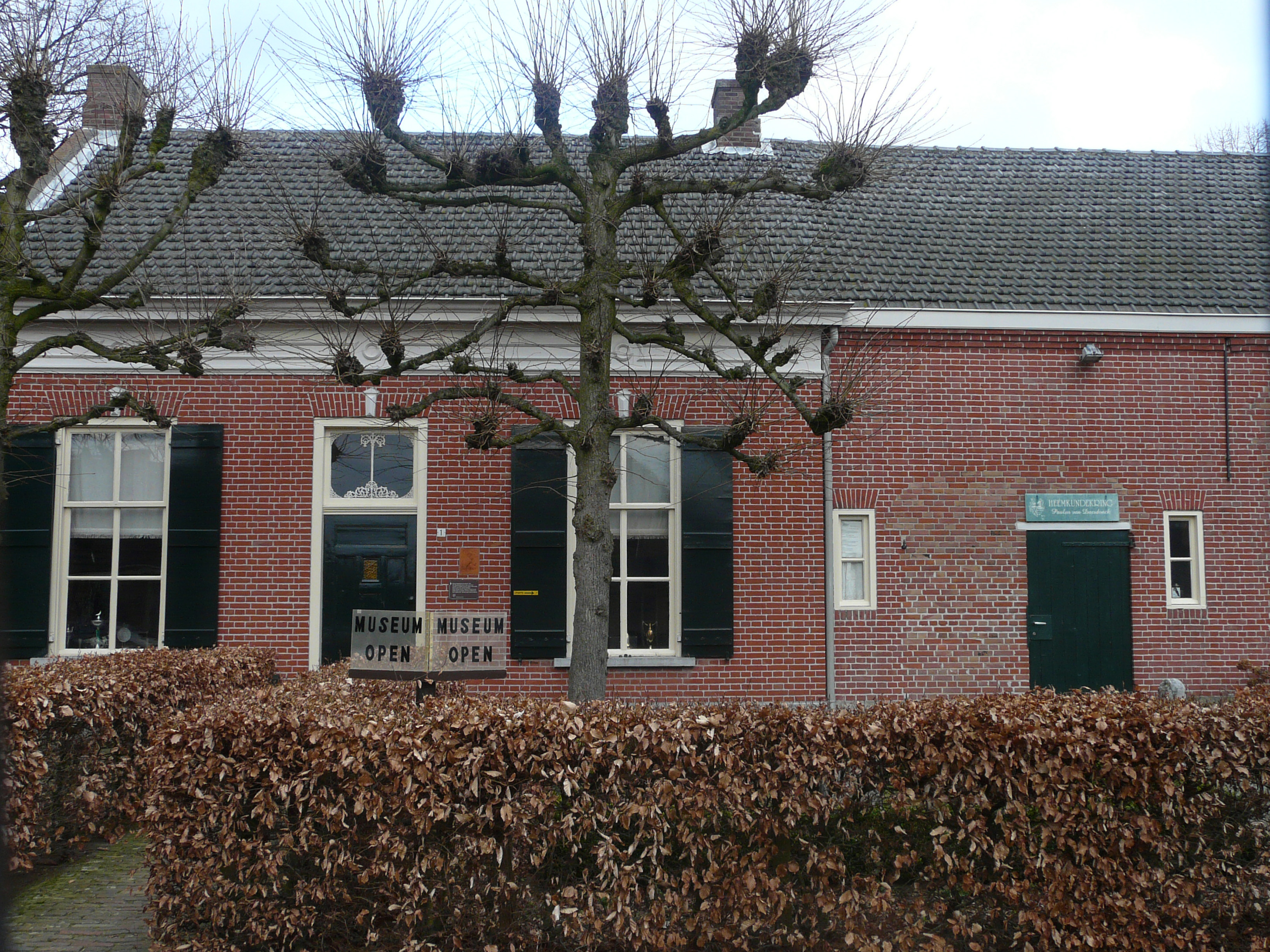
Breda Heemkundig Museum Paulus van Daesdonck

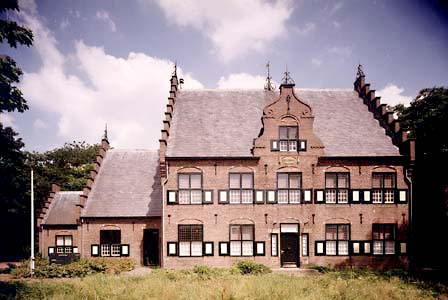
Deurne Museum De Wieger

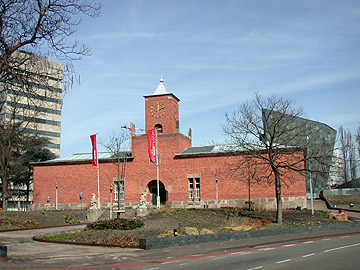
Eindhoven Van Abbemuseum

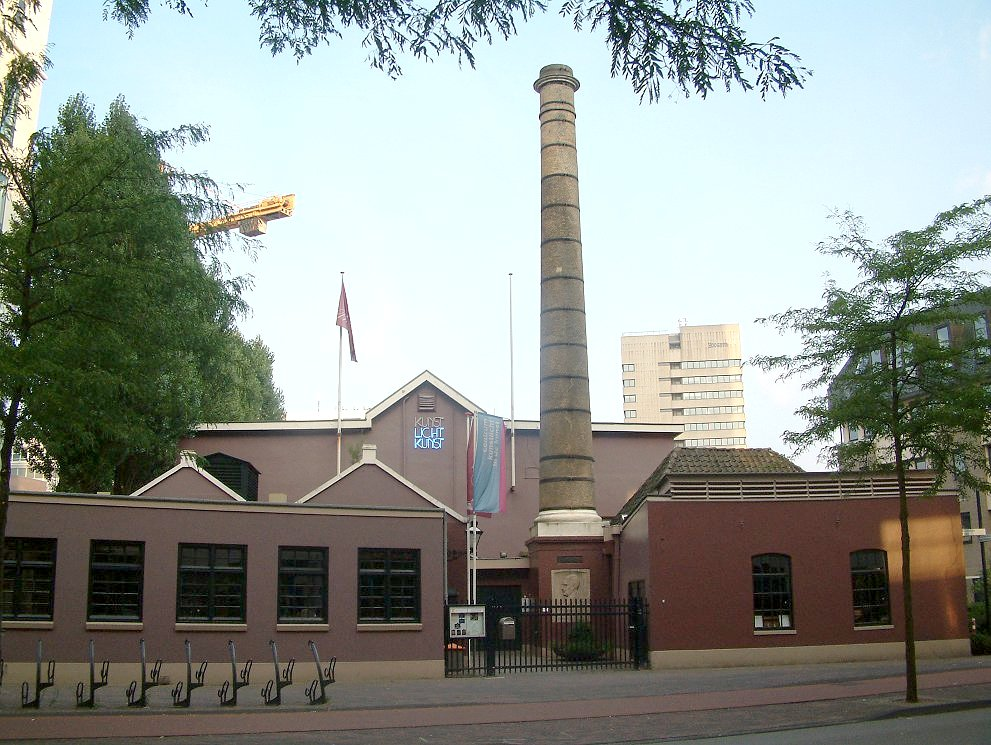
Eindhoven Museum Kunstlicht en Philipsfabriekje

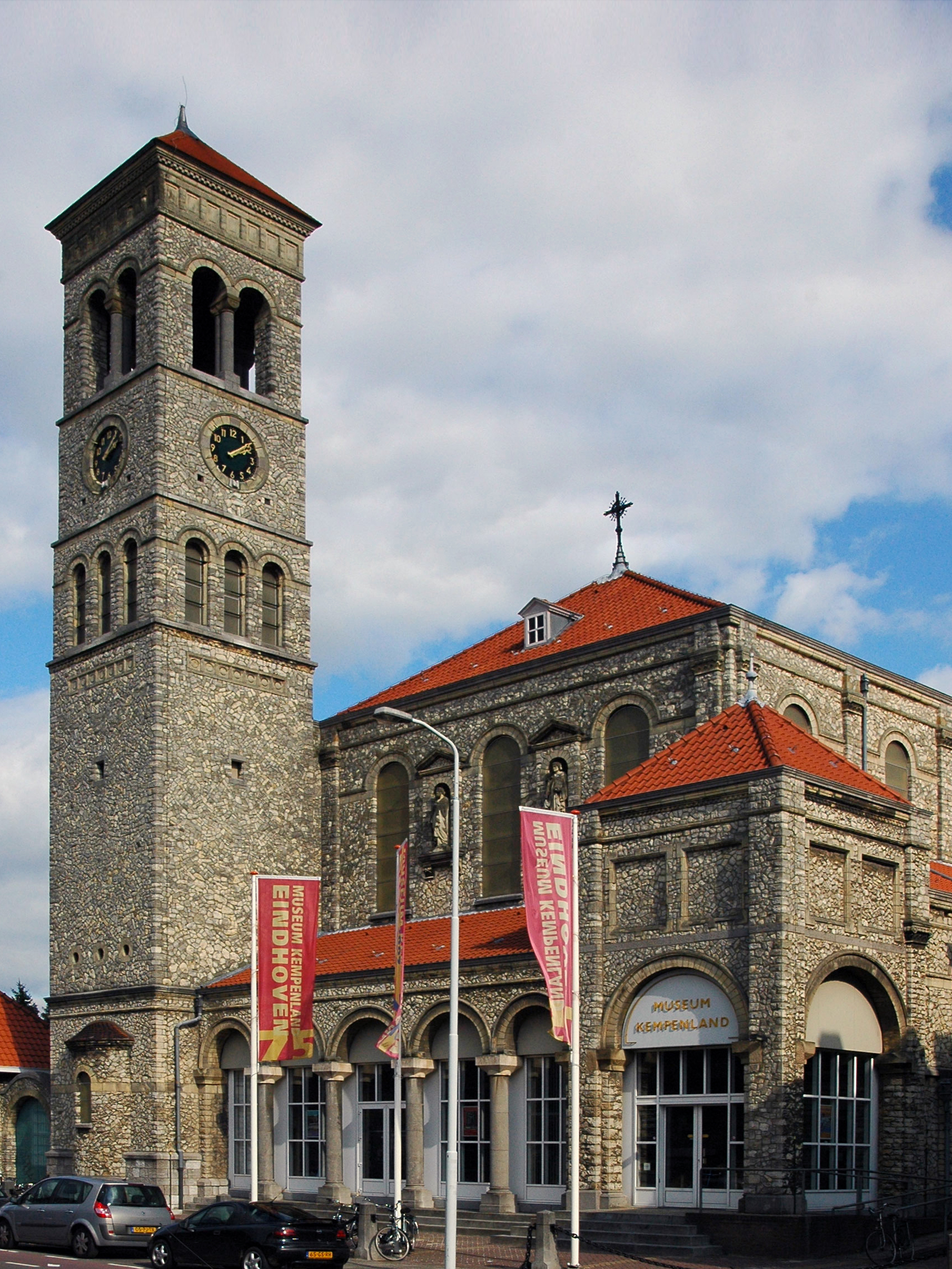
Eindhoven Museum Kempenland

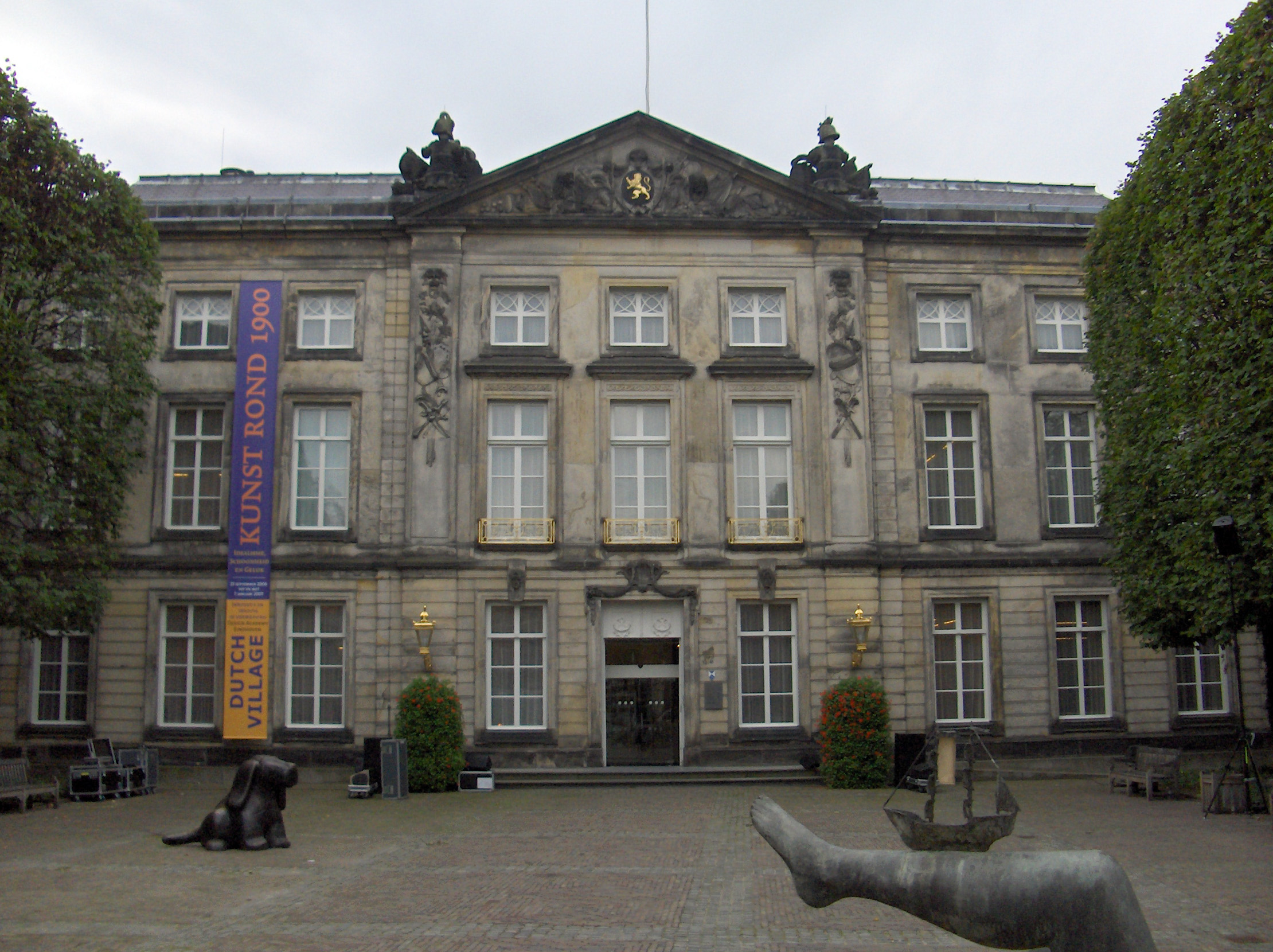
Den Bosch Noordbrabants Museum

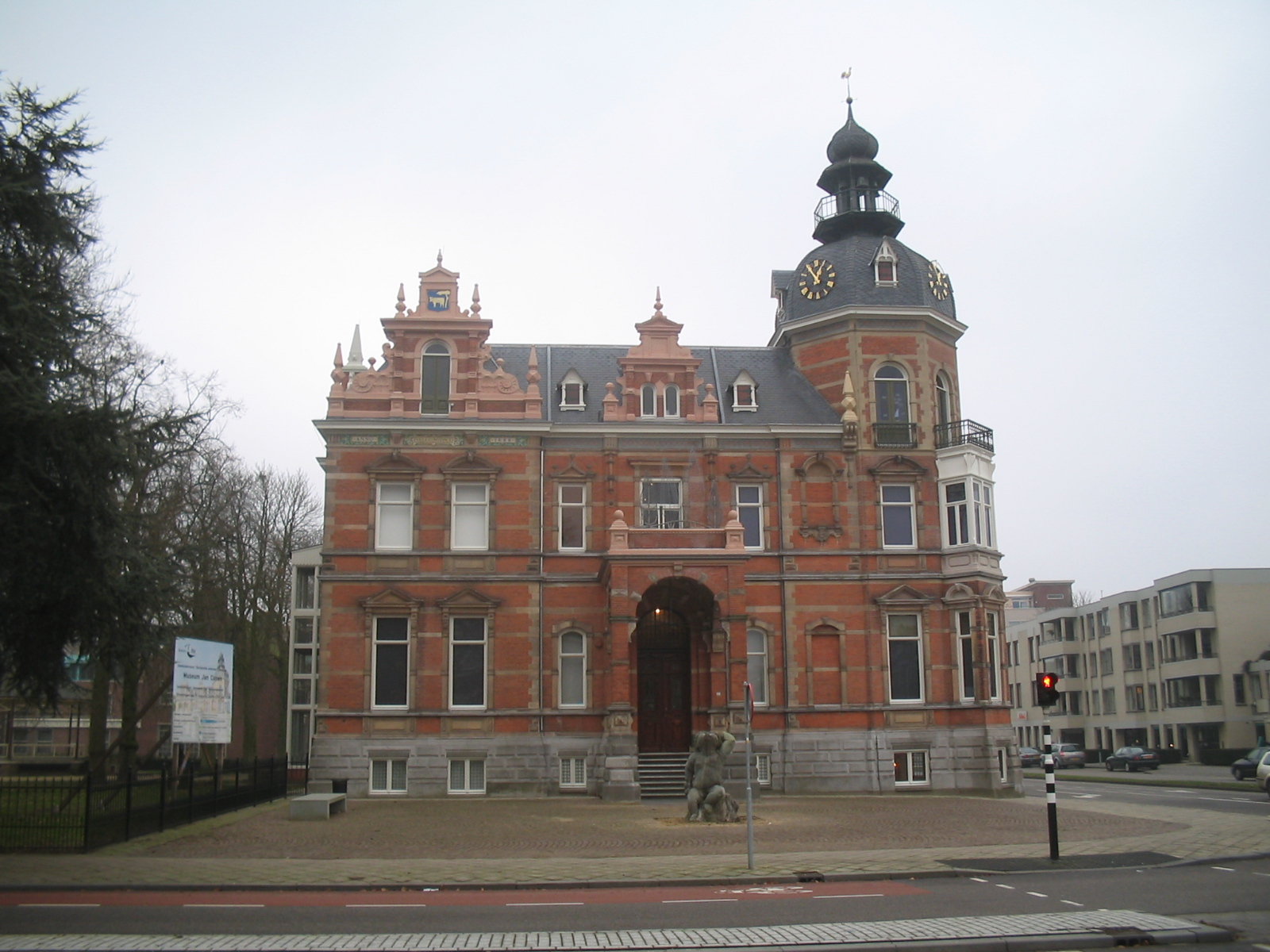
Oss Museum Jan Kunen

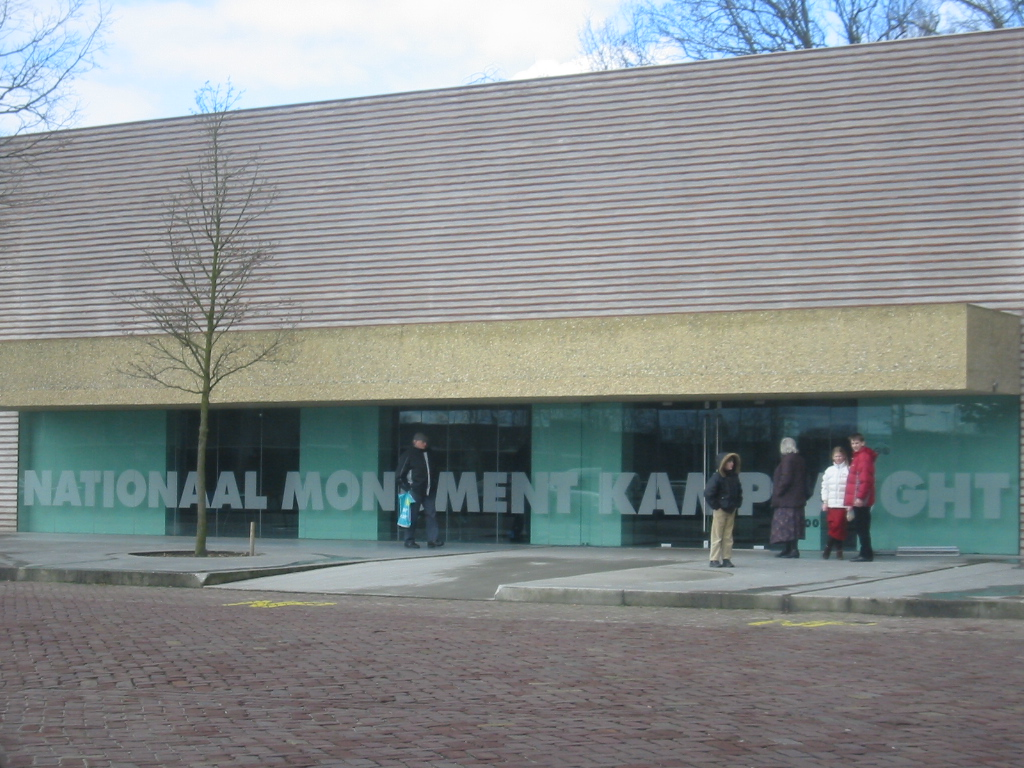
Nationaal Monument Kamp Vught

=== Asten ===
- Nationaal Beiaardmuseum
- Natuurhistorisch Mus. De Peel

=== Bergeijk ===
- AutomusA

=== Bergen op Zoom ===
- Het Markiezenhof

=== Best ===
- Klompenmuseum De Platijn
- Museum Bevrijdende Vleugels

=== Boxtel ===
- Oertijdmuseum De Groene Poort
- Wasch- en Strijkmuseum

=== Breda ===
- Breda's Museum
- Begijnhof Breda Museum
- MOTI, Museum of the Image, previously the Graphic Design Museum
- Generaal Maczek Museum
- Bier Reclame Museum
- Heemkundig Museum Paulus van Daesdonck
- Lucifer Museum Latent
- Museum Oorlog & Vrede
- NAC Museum
- Nederlands Centrum voor Handwerken - HCH
- Stichting Princenhaags Museum
- Volkenkundig museum 'Justinus van Nassau' (opgeheven)

=== Budel ===
- WS-19

=== Cuijk ===
- Amerika Museum

=== Deurne ===
- De Wieger

=== Dongen ===
- Dongha museum

=== Eersel ===
- De Acht Zaligheden

=== Eindhoven ===
- Van Abbemuseum
- Centrum Kunstlicht in de Kunst
- DAFmuseum
- Historisch Openluchtmuseum Eindhoven
- Museum Kempenland
- Philips Gloeilampenfabriekje anno 1891
- Evoluon - National Design Museum

=== Etten-Leur ===
- Drukkerijmuseum
- Streekmuseum Jan Uten Houte

=== Geldrop ===
- Weverijmuseum

=== Gewande ===
- Archeologisch en Paleontologisch Museum Hertogsgemaal

=== Handel ===
- 't Museumke

=== Hank ===
- Bakeliet en Plastic Museum

=== Heesch ===
- Poppenhuismuseum

=== Heeswijk Dinther ===
- Kasteel Heeswijk

=== Helmond ===
- Gemeentemuseum Helmond

=== 's-Hertogenbosch ===
- Museum De Bouwloods
- Jheronimus Bosch Art Center
- Noordbrabants Museum
- Het Oeteldonks Gemintemuzejum
- Stedelijk Museum 's-Hertogenbosch
- Museum Slager

=== Oss ===
- Museum Jan Cunen

=== Overloon ===
- Nationaal Oorlogs- en Verzetsmuseum

=== Raamsdonksveer ===
- Nationaal Automobiel Museum

=== Ravenstein ===
- Museum voor vlakglas- en emaillekunst

=== Rosmalen ===
- Autotron

=== Tilburg ===
- De Pont Modern Art
- Museum Scryption (Closed)
- Natuurmuseum Brabant
- Textielmuseum
- Kessels Music Instruments Museum
- Peerke Donders Paviljoen

=== Uden ===
- Museum voor Religieuze Kunst

=== Valkenswaard ===
- Nederlands Steendrukmuseum

=== Vught ===
- Geniemuseum
- Nationaal Monument Kamp Vught
- Vughts Historisch Museum

=== Waalwijk ===
- Nederlands Leder en Schoenen Museum

=== Werkendam ===
- Biesbosch Museum Werkendam

== North Holland ==
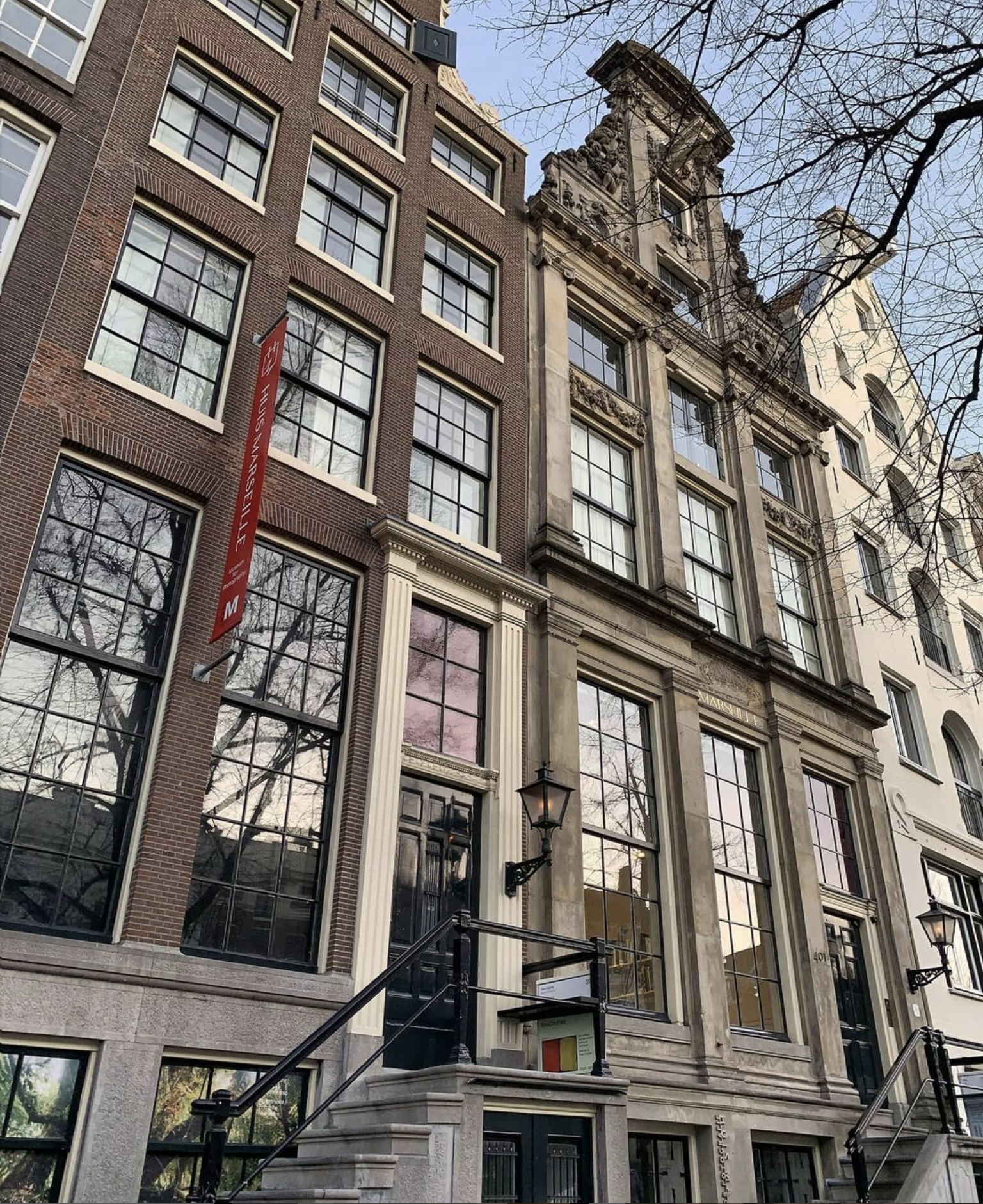
Huis Marseille, Museum for Photography

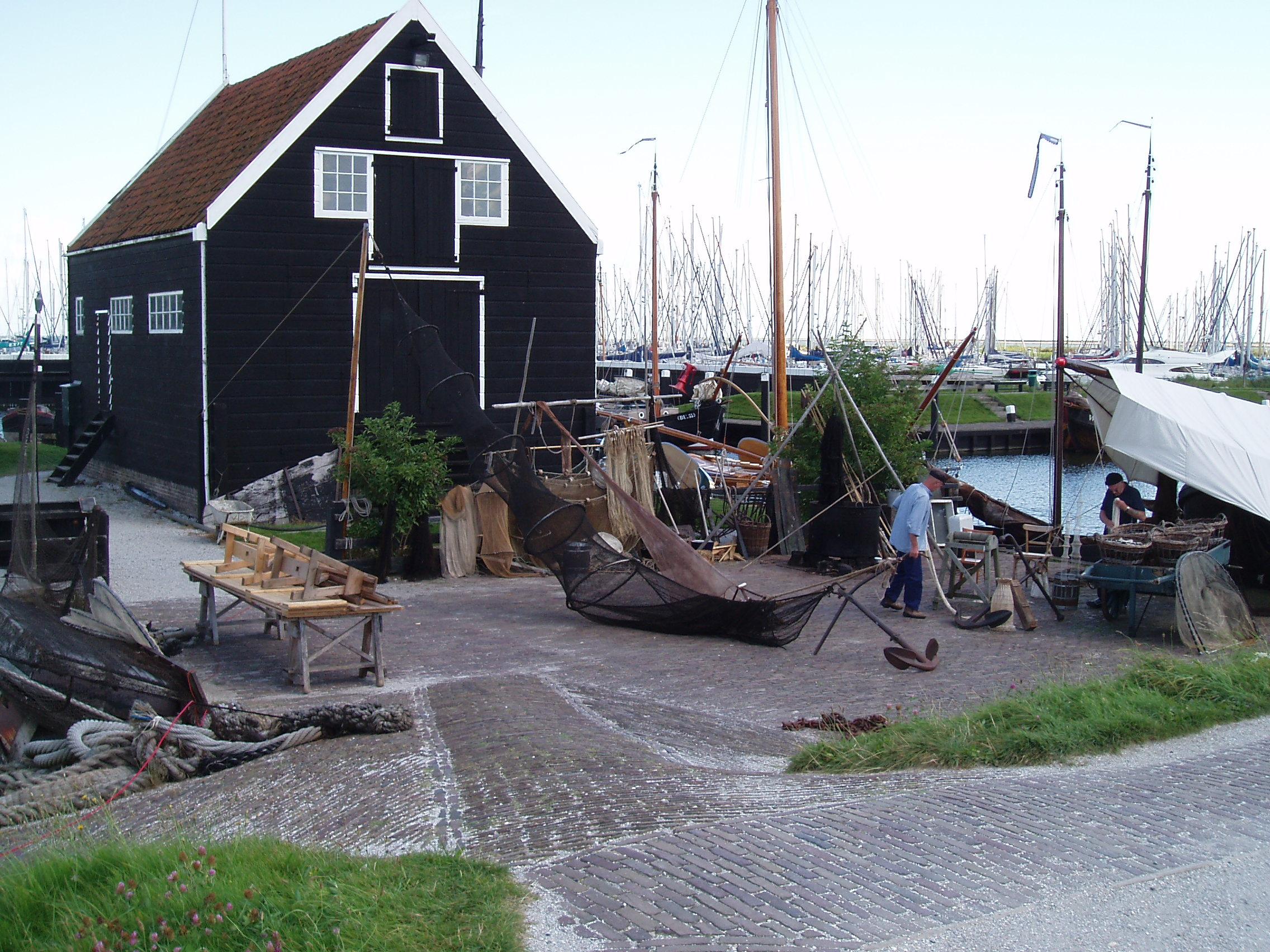
Zuiderzeemuseum Enkhuizen

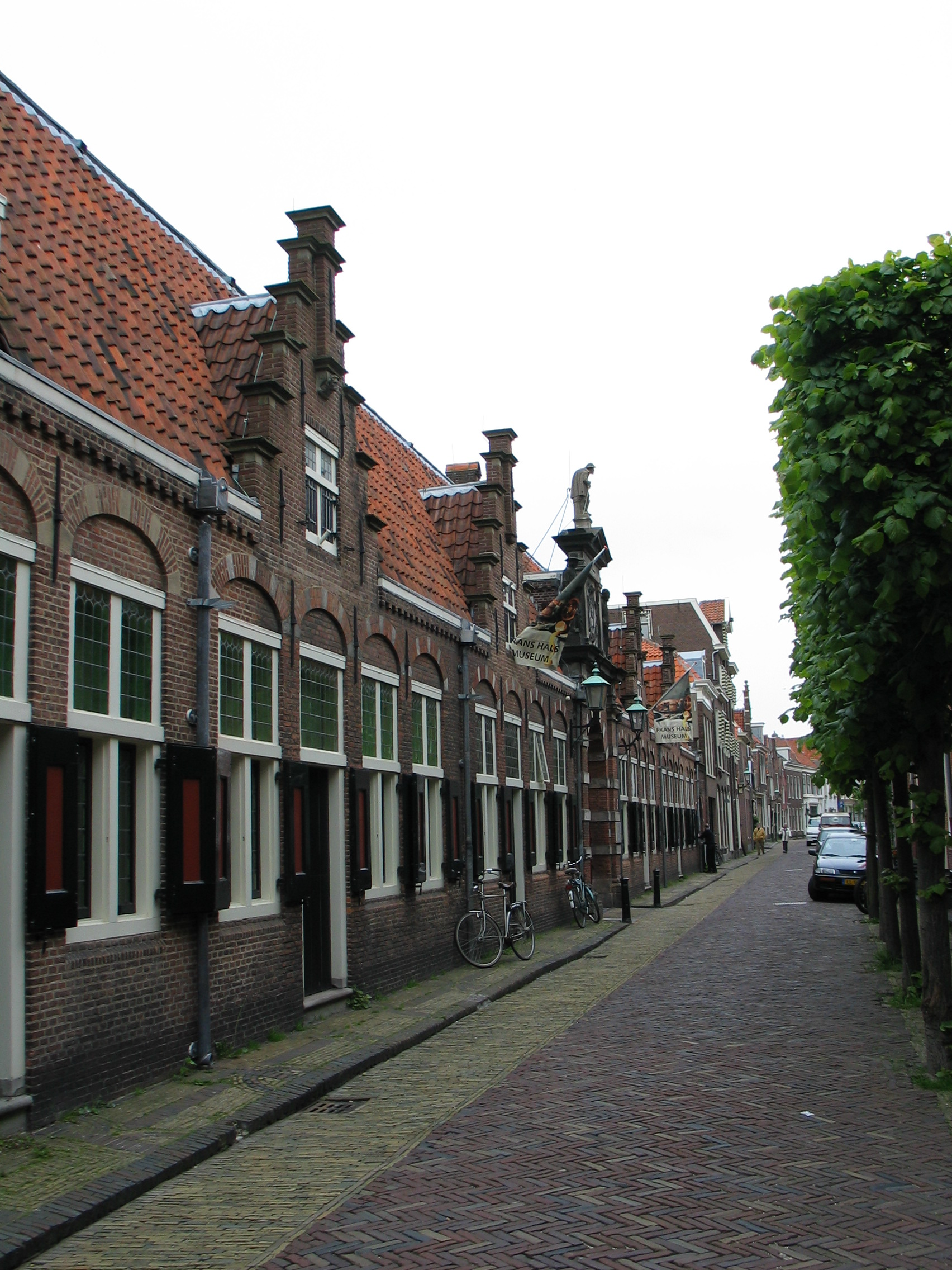
Frans Hals Museum Haarlem

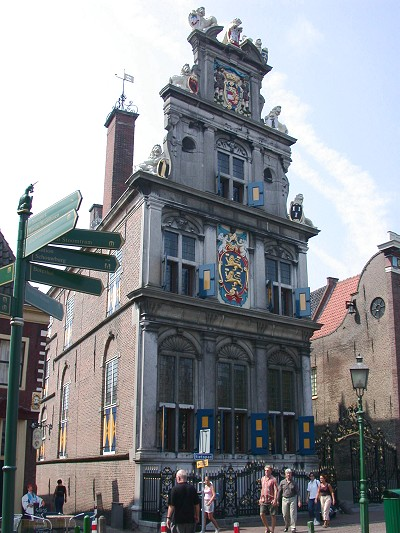
Westfries Museum Hoorn

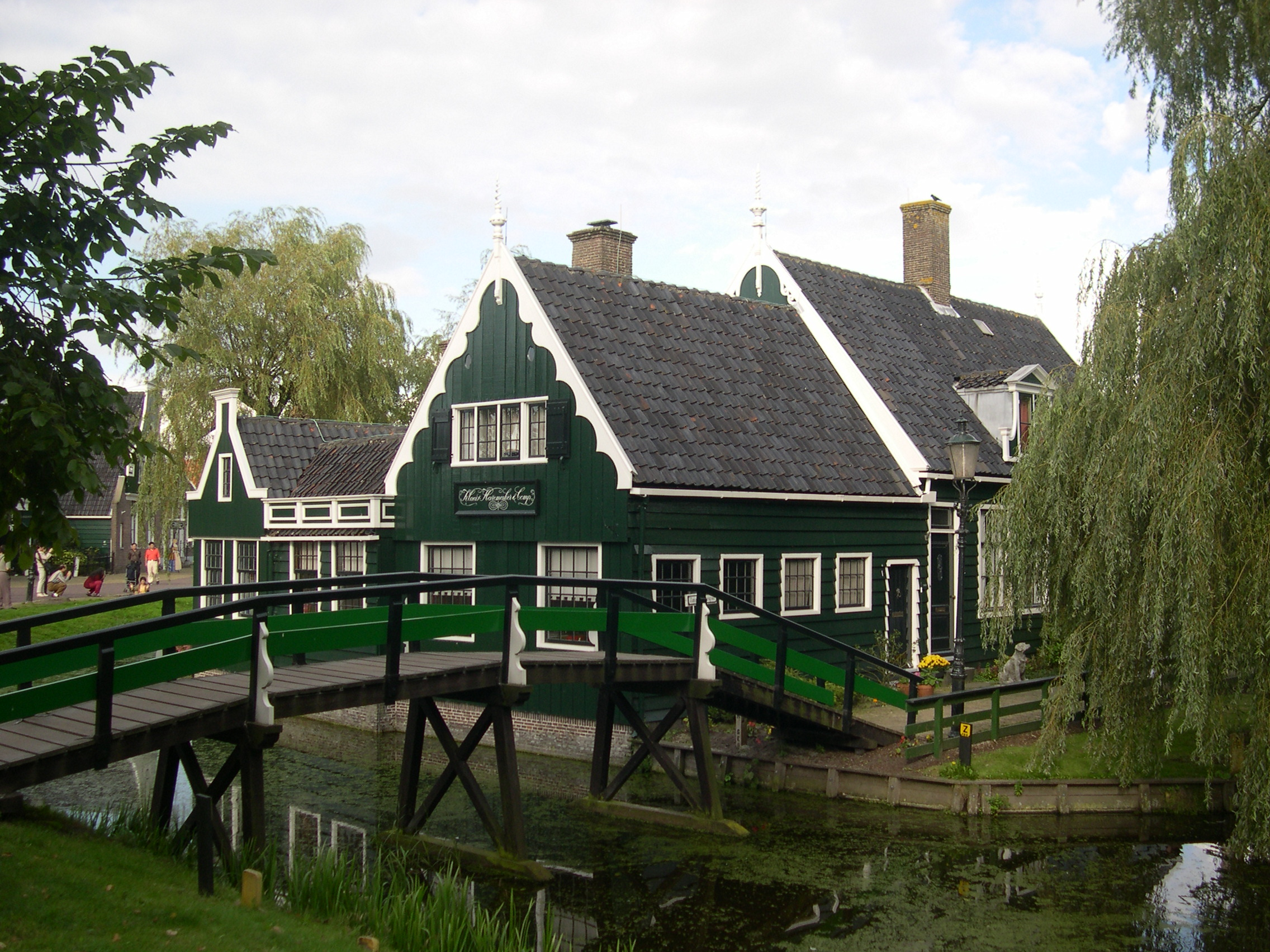
Zaanse Schans Zaandam

=== Alkmaar ===
- Hollands Kaas Museum
- Nationaal Biermuseum "De Boom"
- Nederlands Kachel Museum
- Stedelijk Museum Alkmaar
- The Beatles Museum

=== Amstelveen ===
- Cobra Museum voor Moderne Kunst Amstelveen

=== Amsterdam ===
- Allard Pierson Museum
- Amstelhof
- Amsterdam City Archives
- Amsterdam Museum
- Amsterdam Tulip Museum
- Anne Frank House
- Artis
- Bijbels Museum
- Diamond Museum Amsterdam
- EYE Film Institute Netherlands
- Foam Fotografiemuseum Amsterdam
- Hash, Marihuana & Hemp Museum
- Heineken Experience
- H'ART Museum
- Het Schip
- Huis Marseille, Museum for Photography
- Joods Historisch Museum
- KattenKabinet
- Madame Tussauds Amsterdam
- Miniature Museum
- Museum Geelvinck-Hinlopen
- Museum Jan van der Togt
- Museum of Bags and Purses
- Museum Van Loon
- Museum Villa
- Museum Vrolik
- Museum Willet-Holthuysen
- Nederlands Scheepvaartmuseum
- NEMO (museum)
- Ons' Lieve Heer op Solder
- Rembrandt House Museum
- Rijksmuseum
- Stedelijk Museum
- Suriname Museum
- Torture Museum
- Tropenmuseum
- Van Gogh Museum
- Verzetsmuseum

=== Bergen ===
- Museum Kranenburgh

=== Beverwijk ===
- Museum Midden-Kennemerland

=== Den Helder ===
- Käthe Kruse Poppen en speelgoedmuseum
- Marinemuseum
- Reddingsmuseum Dorus Rijkers

=== Enkhuizen ===
- Zuiderzeemuseum

=== Haarlem ===
- Archeologisch Museum Haarlem, archeological museum of Haarlem
- Barrel Organ Museum Haarlem
- Museum van de Geest, museum of psychiatry
- Frans Hals Museum, museum of fine arts
- Geologisch Museum (1853–1864)
- Historisch Museum Haarlem (cultural history of Zuid-Kennemerland)
- Museum De Hallen, Haarlem, modern art wing of the Frans Hals museum
- NZH Vervoer Museum, (de Blauwe Tram)
- Teylers Museum (the oldest public museum in the Netherlands)

=== Hilversum ===
- Museum Hilversum
- Nederlands Instituut voor Beeld en Geluid

=== Hoofddorp ===
- Historisch Museum Haarlemmermeer, streekmuseum Haarlemmermeer

=== Hoorn ===
- Affichemuseum
- Historisch Museum Turkije-Nederland
- Museum van de twintigste eeuw
- Museumstoomtram Hoorn-Medemblik
- Speelgoedmuseum De Kijkdoos
- Westfries Museum

=== IJmuiden ===
- IJmuider Zee- en Havenmuseum
- Bunker Museum IJmuiden

=== Laren ===
- Singer Laren

=== Medemblik ===
- Nederlands Stoommachinemuseum
- Bakkerijmuseum 'de oude bakkerij'
- Kasteel Radboud

=== Monnickendam ===
- DDR-Museum

=== Naarden ===
- Nederlands Vestingmuseum

=== Venhuizen ===
- Museum Møhlmann

=== Zaandam ===
- Zaans Museum
- Zaanse Schans
- Tsaar Peterhuisje
- Verkade Paviljoen

== Overijssel ==
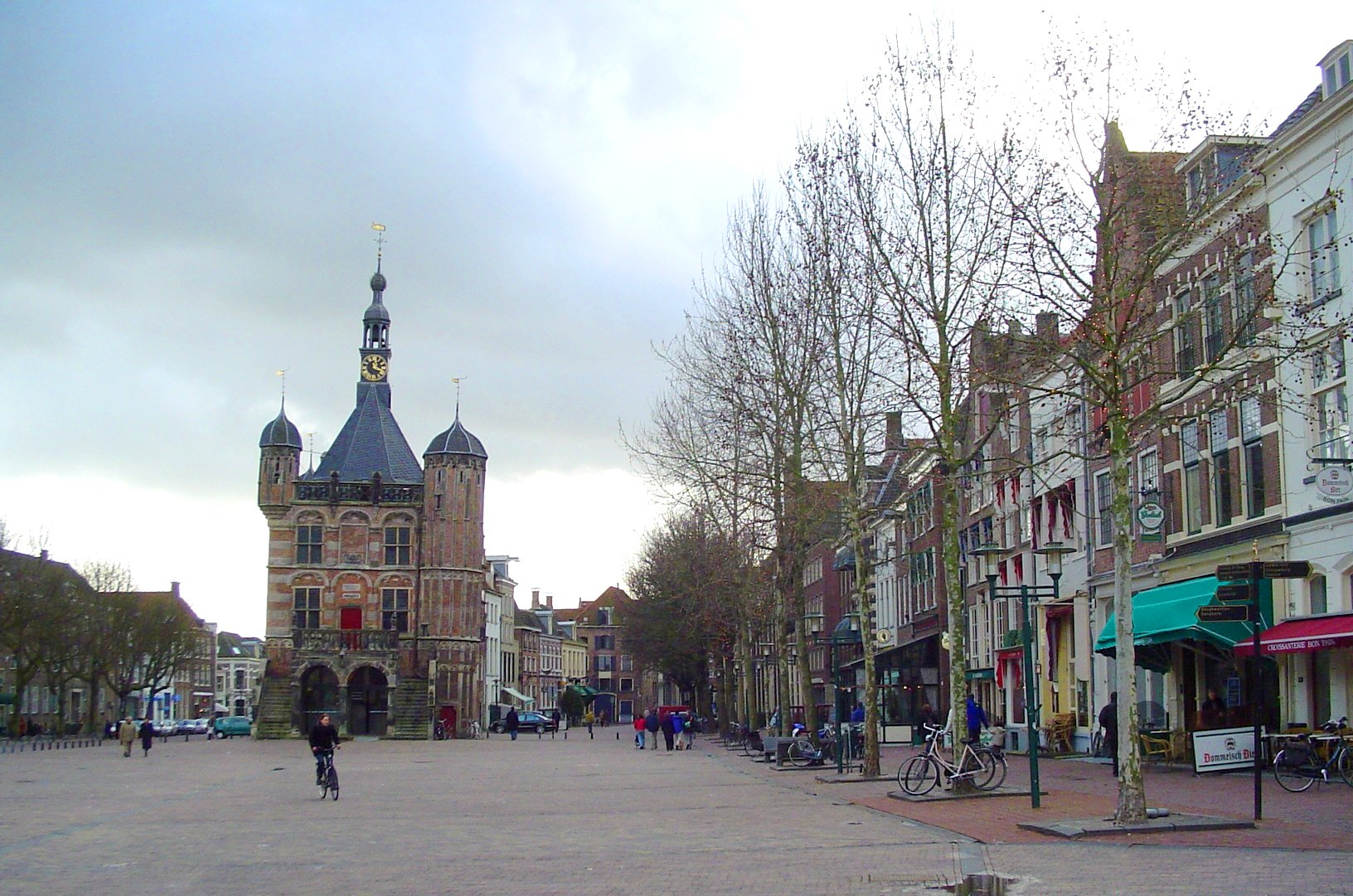
Deventer Museum De Waag

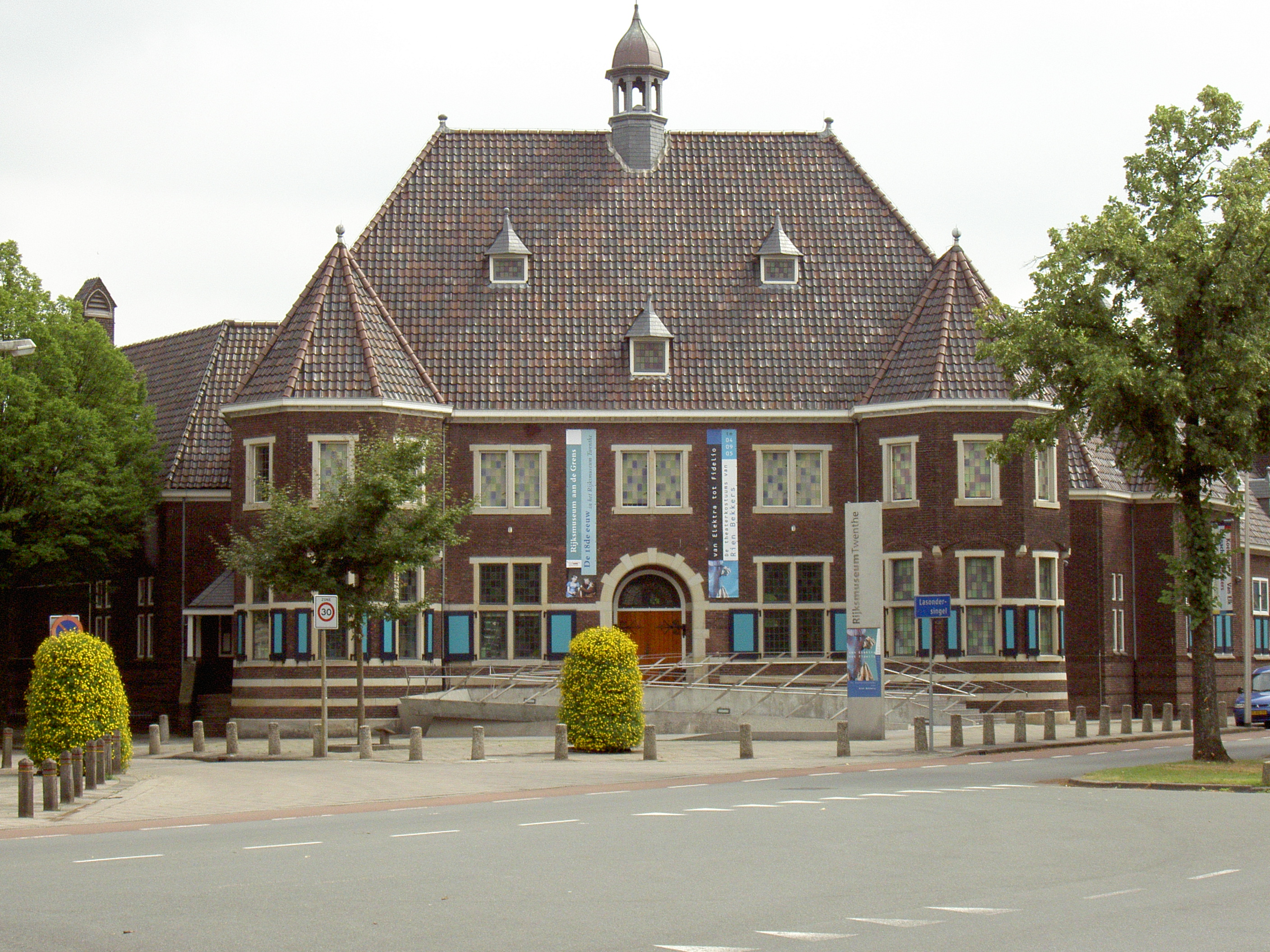
Enschede Rijksmuseum Twente

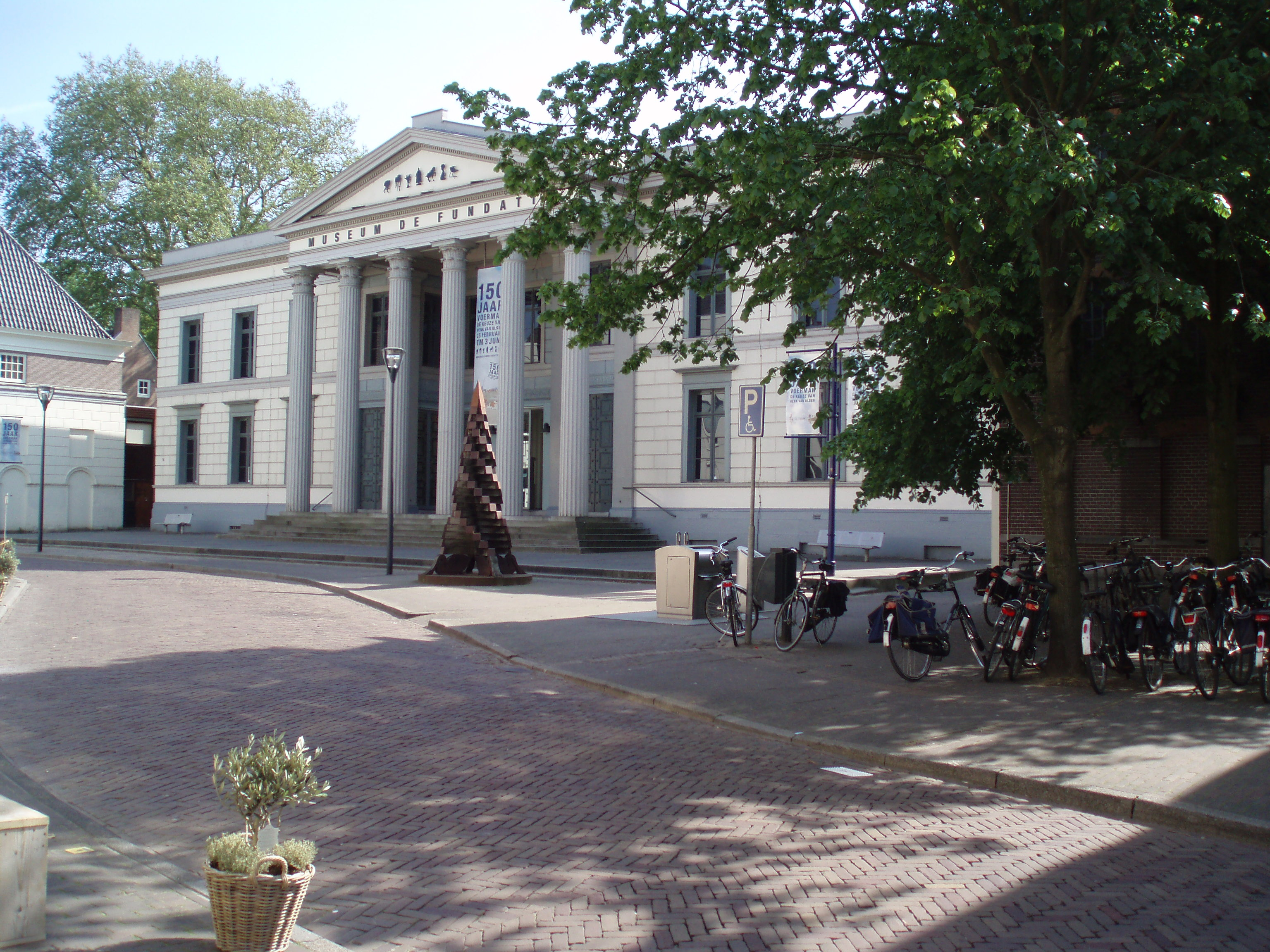
Zwolle Museum De Fundatie

=== Almelo ===
- Stadsmuseum Almelo

=== Ambt Delden ===
- Museumboerderij Wende Zoele

=== Blokzijl ===
- Het Gildenhuys

=== Delden ===
- Zoutmuseum

=== Denekamp ===
- Natura Docet

=== Deventer ===
- Historisch Museum Deventer
- Speelgoed- en Blikmuseum

=== Enschede ===
- Rijksmuseum Twenthe
- TwentseWelle

=== Enter ===
- Klompen- en Zompenmuseum
- Oudheidkamer Buisjan

=== Genemuiden ===
- Tapijtmuseum

=== Giethoorn ===
- 't Olde Maat Uus
- Museum De Oude Aarde

=== Haaksbergen ===
- Museum Buurt Spoorweg

=== Hardenberg ===
- HistorieKamer Hardenberg

=== Heino ===
- Kasteel Het Nijenhuis, one of two locations of Museum de Fundatie

=== Hellendoorn ===
- Gerrit Valk's Bakkerij- en IJsmuseum
- Smederijmuseum

=== Hengelo ===
- Historisch Museum Hengelo
- Techniekmuseum Heim

=== Holten ===
- Natuurdiorama Holterberg

=== Kampen ===
- Ikonenmuseum Kampen
- Stedelijk Museum Kampen

=== Nieuwleusen ===
- Museum Palthehof

=== Oldenzaal ===
- Museum Palthehuis

=== Ootmarsum ===
- Educatorium

=== Vriezenveen ===
- Historisch Museum Vriezenveen

=== Zwolle ===
- Paleis aan de Blijmarkt, one of two locations of Museum de Fundatie
- Stedelijk Museum Zwolle
- Bonami Games en Computers Museum
- Herman Brood Museum

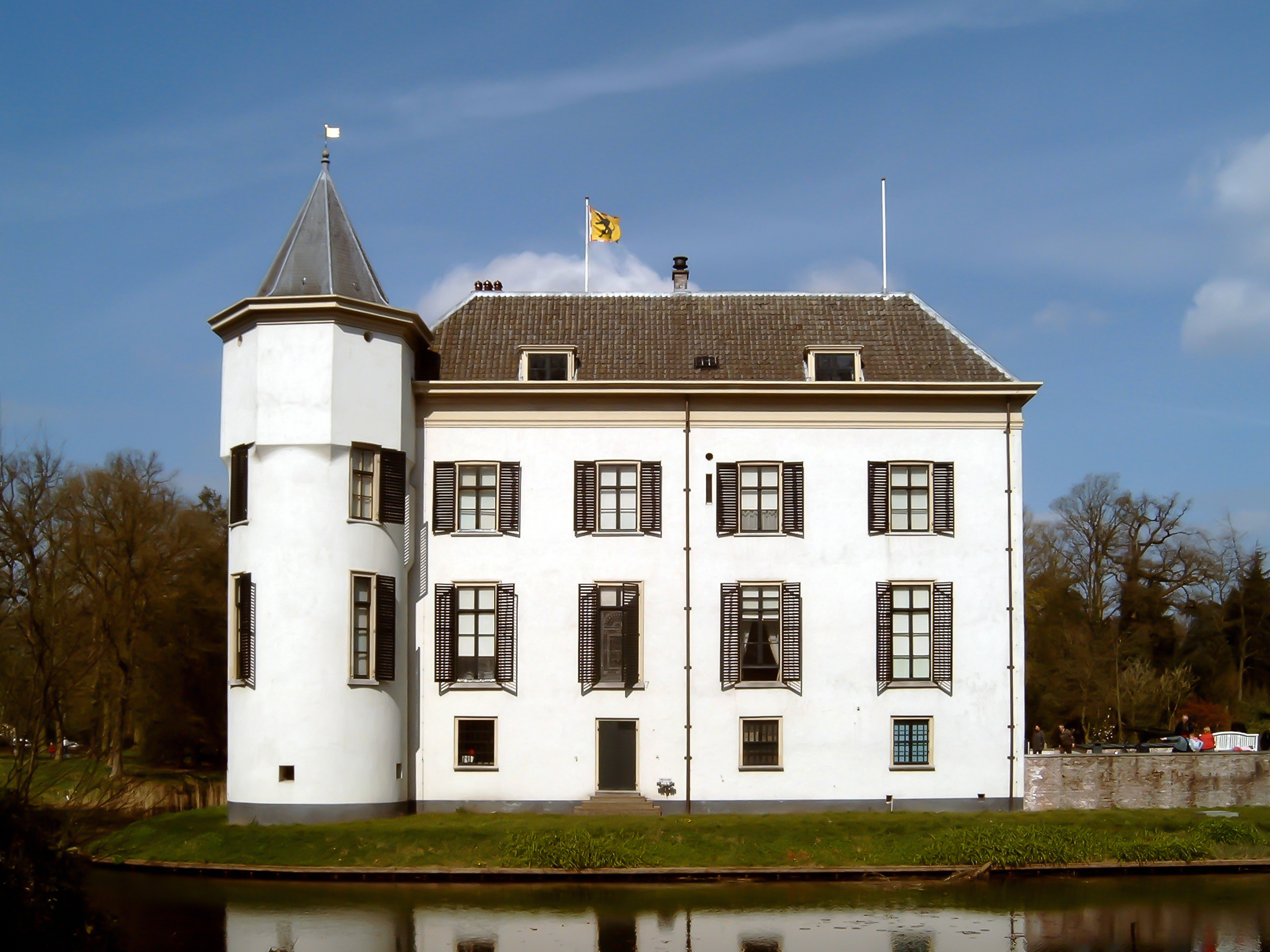
Huis Doorn

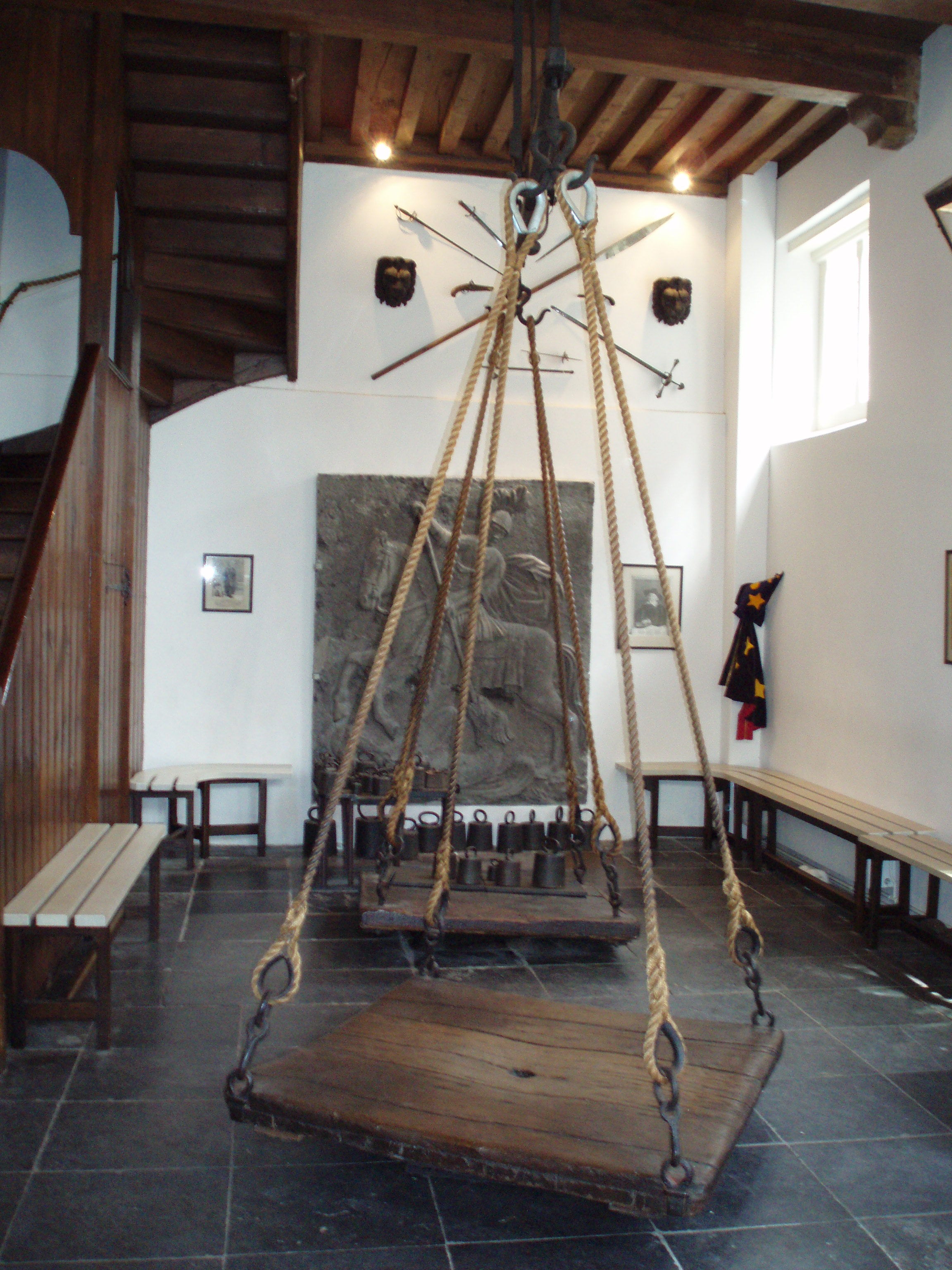
Heksenwaag Oudewater

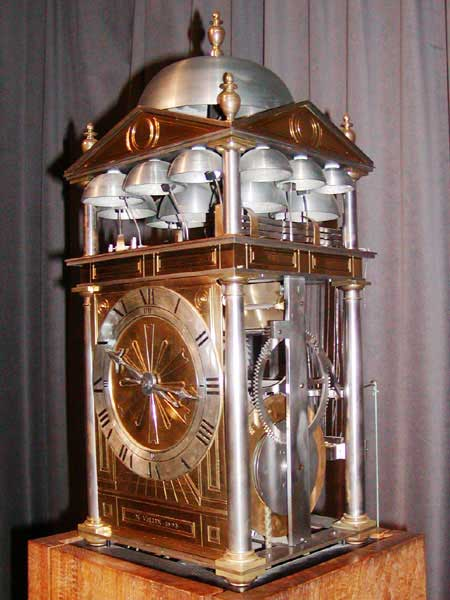
Museum Speelklok Utrecht

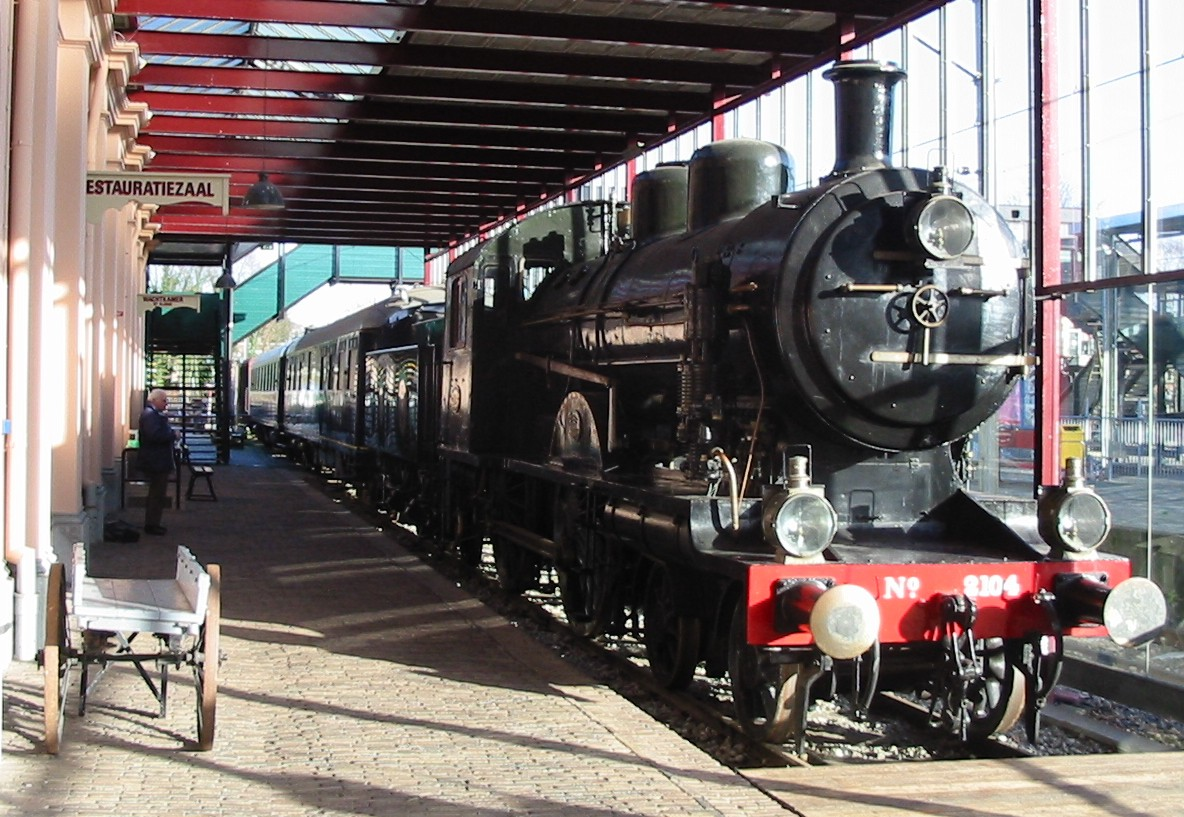
Spoorwegmuseum Utrecht

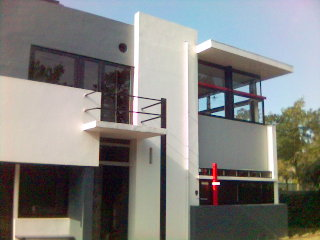
Rietveld Schröderhuis Utrecht

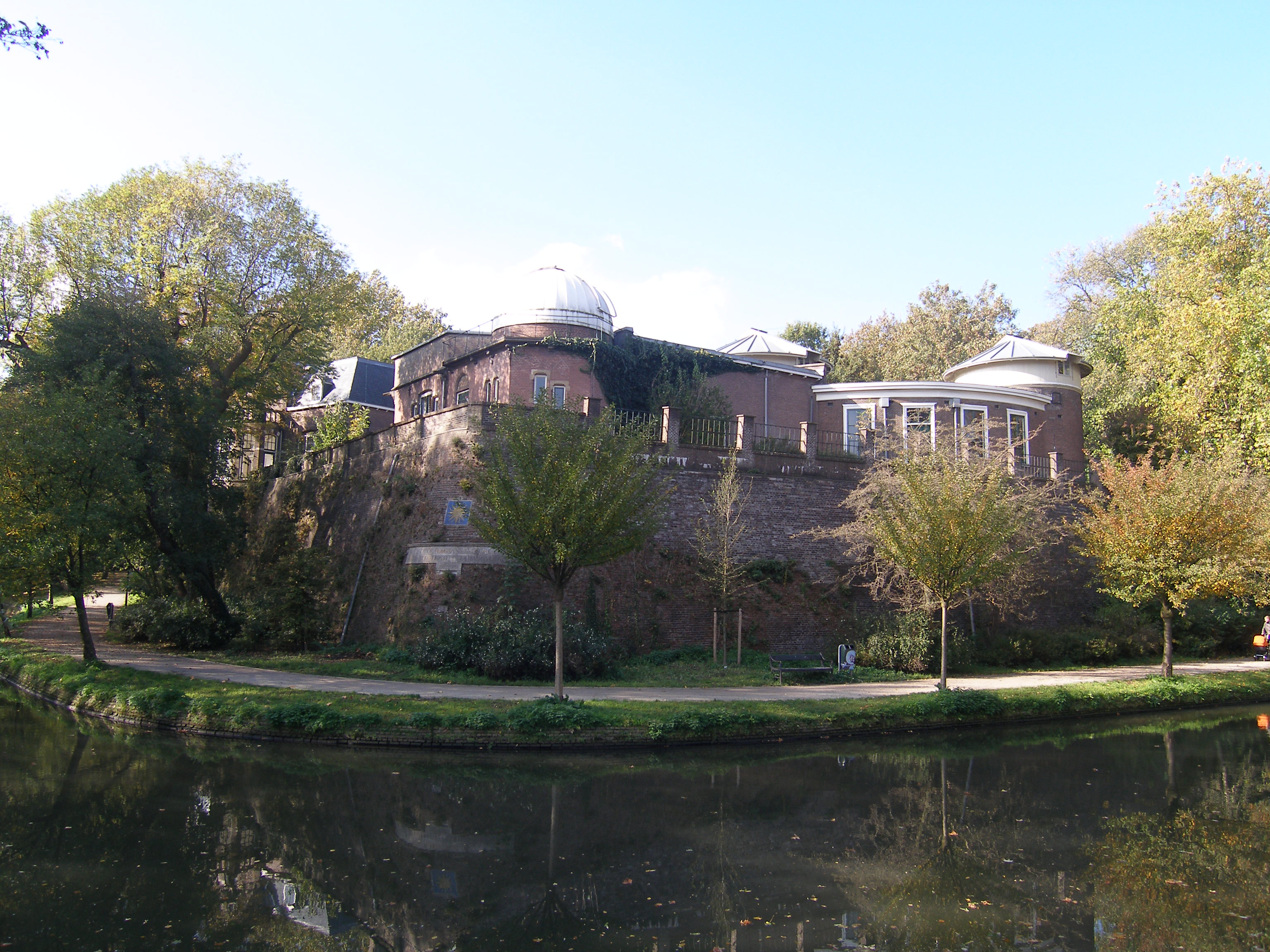
Sonnenborgh-museum & sterrenwacht Utrecht

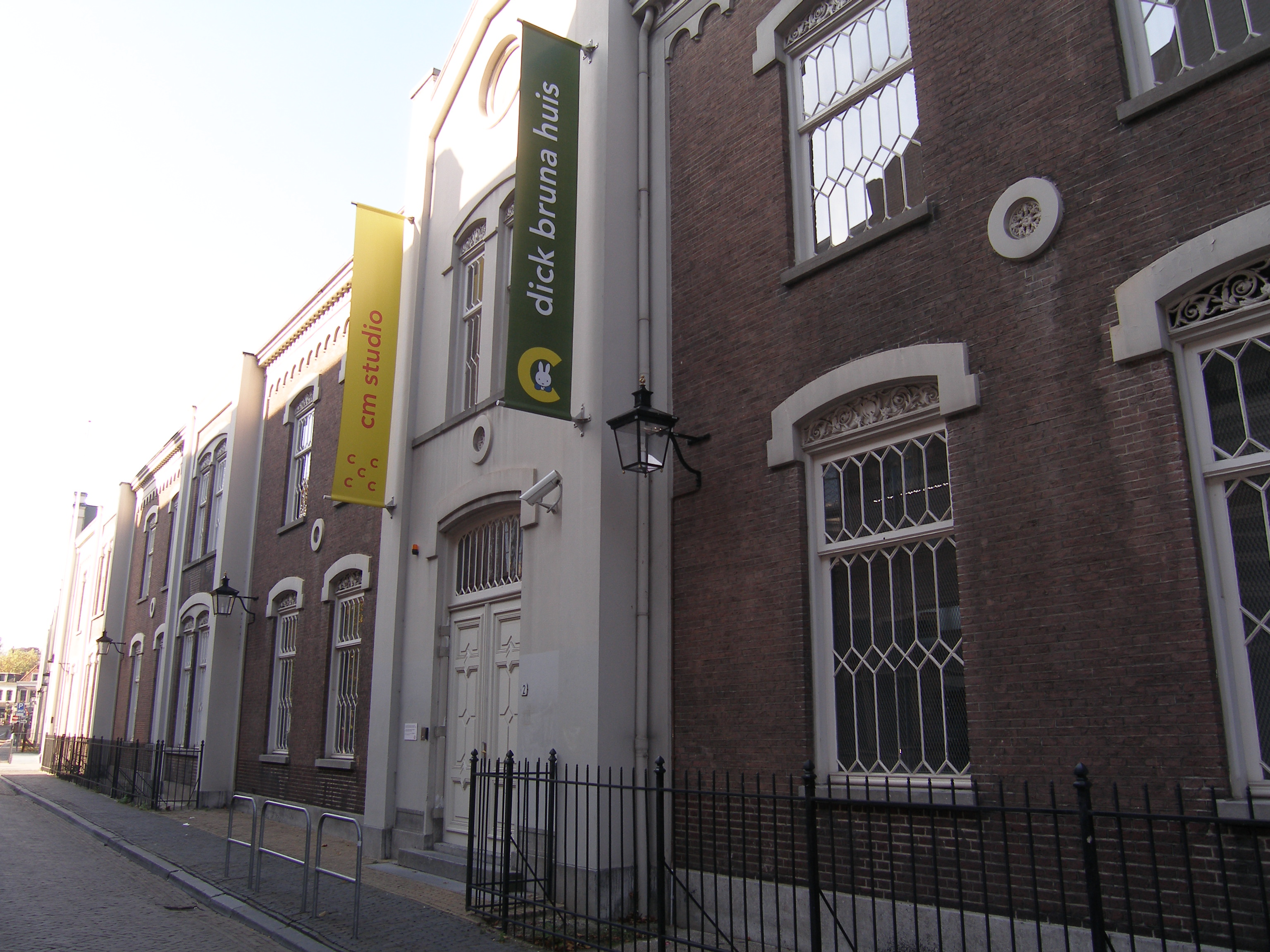
dick bruna huis Utrecht

== Utrecht ==
=== Amerongen ===
- Amerongs Historisch- en Tabaksmuseum
- Amerongen Castle

=== Amersfoort ===
- Armando Museum
- Dutch Cavalry Museum
- Culinair Museum
- De Zonnehof
- The Mondriaan House
- Museum Flehite Amersfoort
- Museum Jacobs van den Hof
- Vindselmuseum in Natura

=== Bunschoten-Spakenburg ===
- Klederdracht- en Visserijmuseum
- Museum 't Vurhuus

=== De Bilt ===
- Museum Beelden op Beerschoten

=== Doorn ===
- Huis Doorn

=== Driebergen-Rijsenburg ===
- Museum 't Schilderhuis

=== Eemnes ===
- Oudheidkamer Eemnes

=== IJsselstein ===
- Stadsmuseum IJsselstein

=== Maarsbergen ===
- Kaas-, Museum- & Partyboerderij 'De Weistaar'

=== Maarssen ===
- Historisch Museum Maarssen
- Nederlands Drogisterij Museum
- Pygmalion Beeldende Kunst

=== Nieuwegein ===
- Historisch Museum Warsenhoek

=== Oudewater ===
- Heksenwaag
- Touwmuseum 'De Baanschuur'

=== Rhenen ===
- Gemeentemuseum Het Rondeel

=== Soest ===
- Museum Oud Soest

=== Soesterberg ===
- Nationaal Militair Museum, combination of the former Militaire Luchtvaart Museum and the Legermuseum (Delft)

=== Utrecht ===
- Aboriginal Art Museum (closed in 2017)
- Centraal Museum
- nijntje museum
- Geldmuseum (closed in 2013)
- Museum Maluku (closed in 2012)
- Museum Catharijneconvent
- Museum van het Kruideniers-bedrijf or Betje Boerhavemuseum
- Museum Speelklok
- Nederlands Spoorwegmuseum
- Rietveld Schröder House
- Sonnenborgh Observatory
- Universiteitsmuseum (Utrecht)
- Nederlands Volksbuurtmuseum

=== Veenendaal ===
- Het Kleine Veenloo
- Vingerhoed Museum

=== Vianen ===
- Stedelijk Museum Vianen

=== Vinkeveen ===
- Museum de Ronde Venen

=== Wijk bij Duurstede ===
- Museum Dorestad

=== Woerden ===
- Drive-in Museum
- Stadsmuseum Woerden

== Zeeland ==
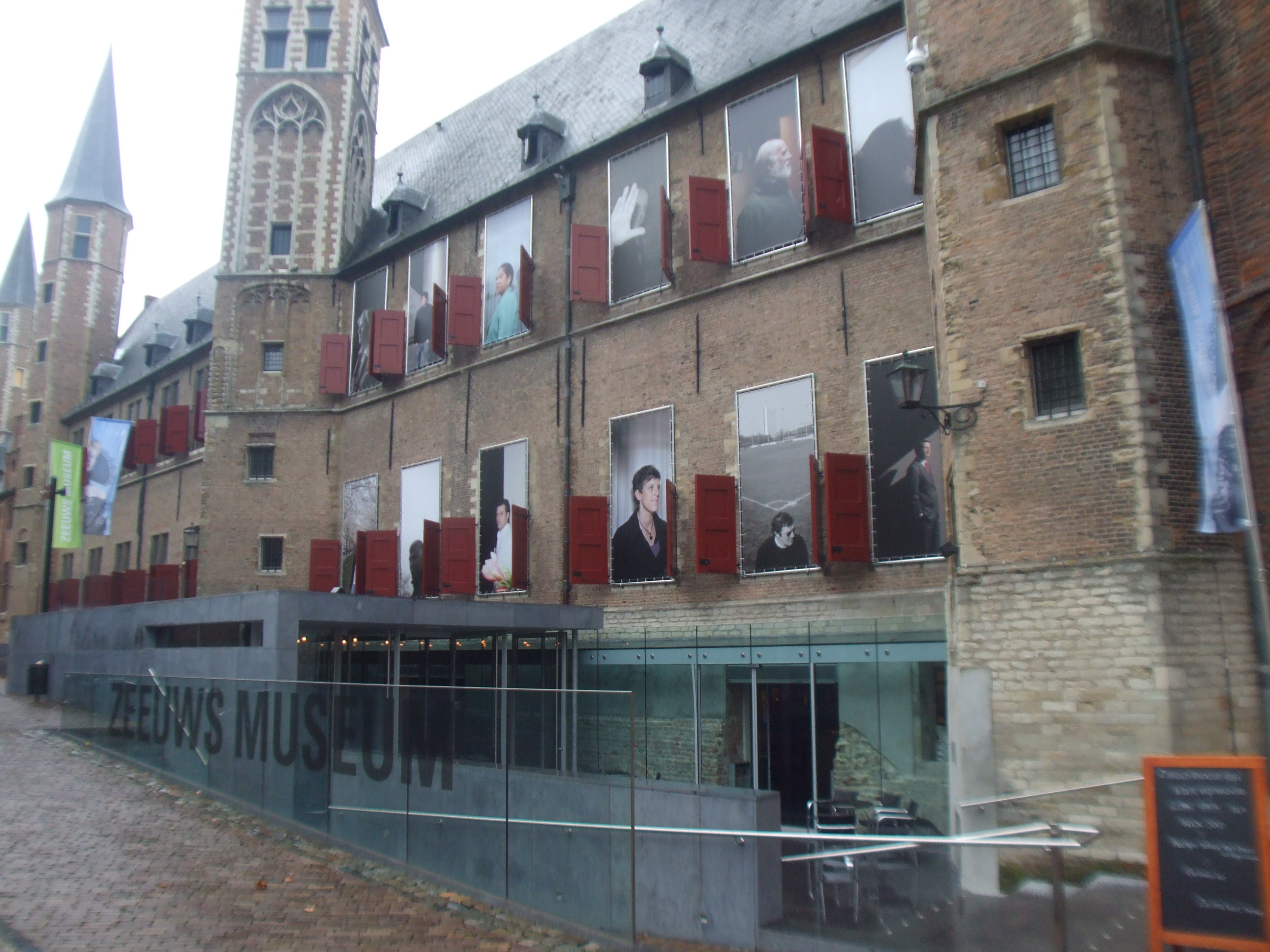
Zeeuws Museum Middelburg

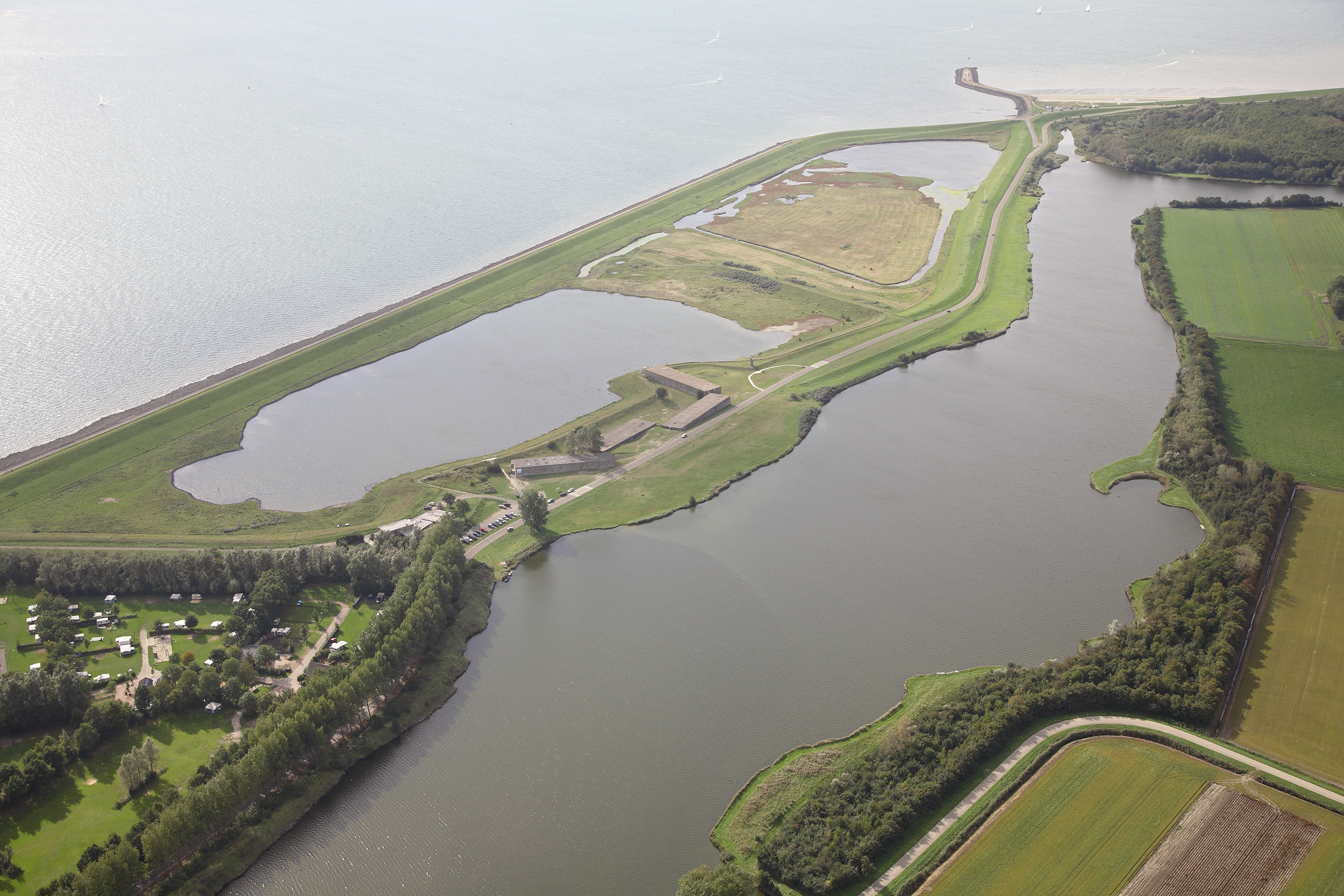
Watersnood Museum Ouwerkerk

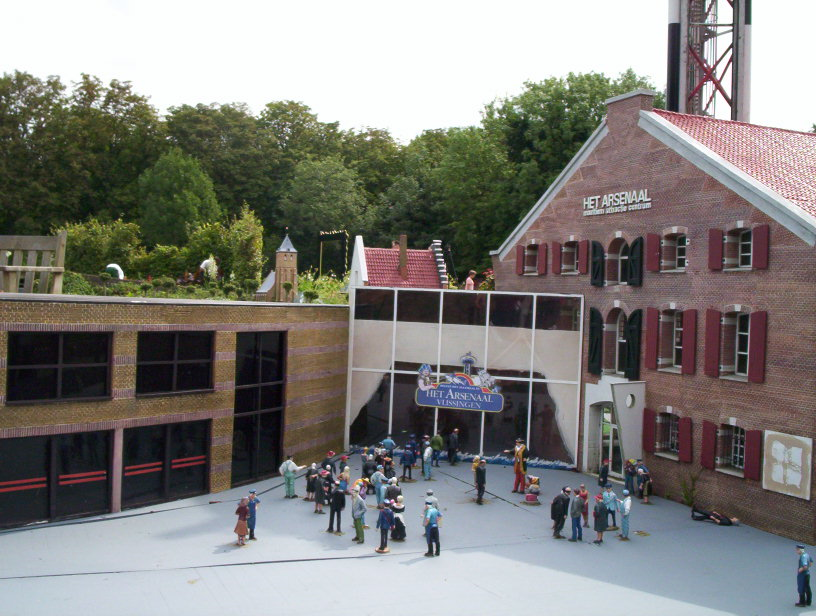
Het Arsenaal vlissingen

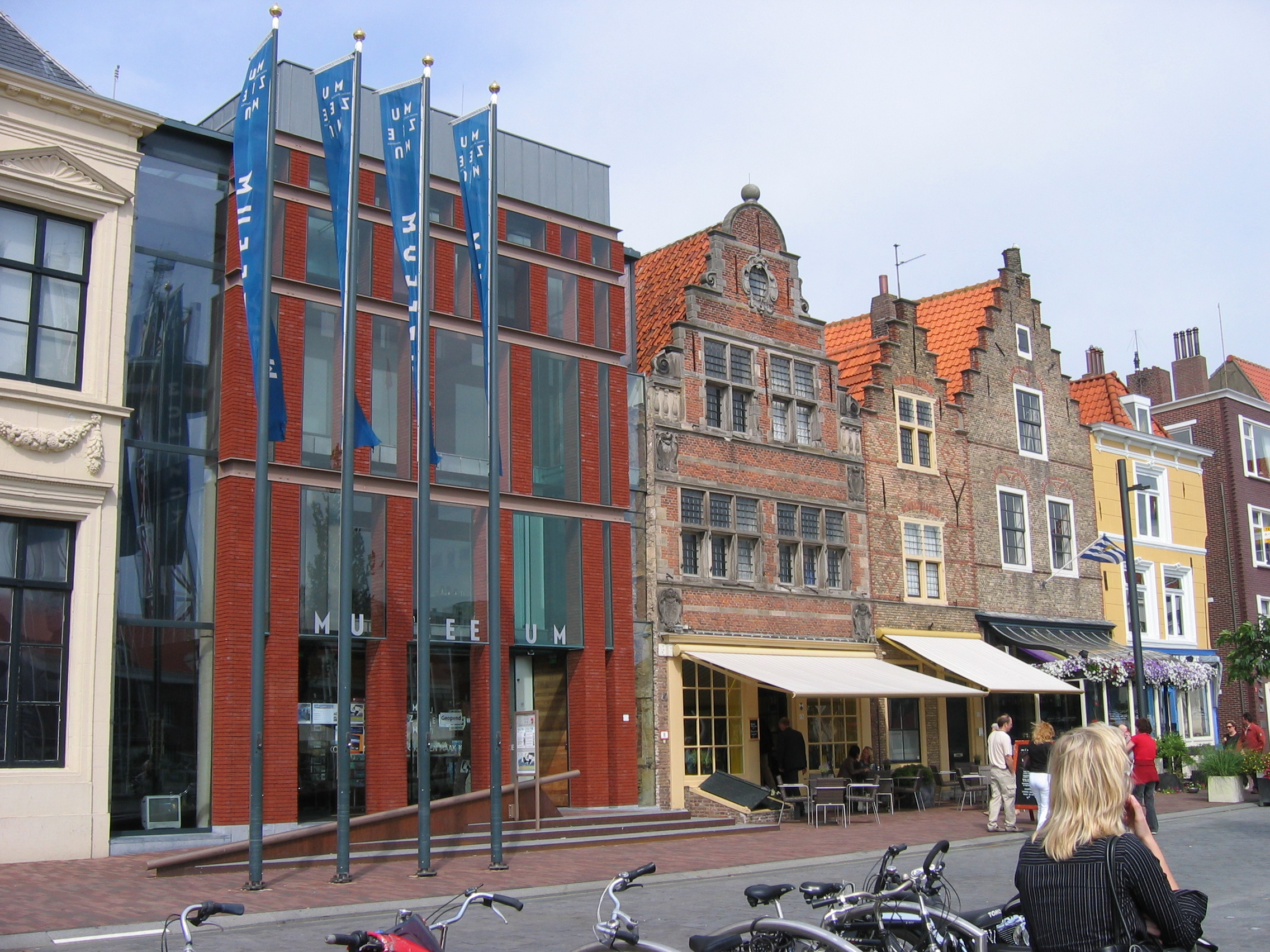
Zeeuws maritiem muZEEum

=== Bruinisse ===
- Visserijmuseum Bruinisse
- Oudheidkamer Bruinisse

=== Domburg ===
- Marie Tak van Poortvliet Museum

=== Goes ===
- Historisch Museum De Bevelanden

=== Kapelle ===
- Fruitteeltmuseum

=== Meliskerke ===
- Zijdemuseum

=== Middelburg ===
- Zeeuws Museum
- Voetbal Experience

=== Neeltje Jans ===
- Deltapark Neeltje Jans

=== Oostburg ===
- Oorlogsmuseum Switchback

=== Oostkapelle ===
- Terra Maris

=== Ouwerkerk ===
- Watersnoodmuseum

=== Vlissingen ===
- Het Arsenaal
- Zeeuws Maritiem muZEEum
- Reptielenzoo Iguana

== South Holland ==
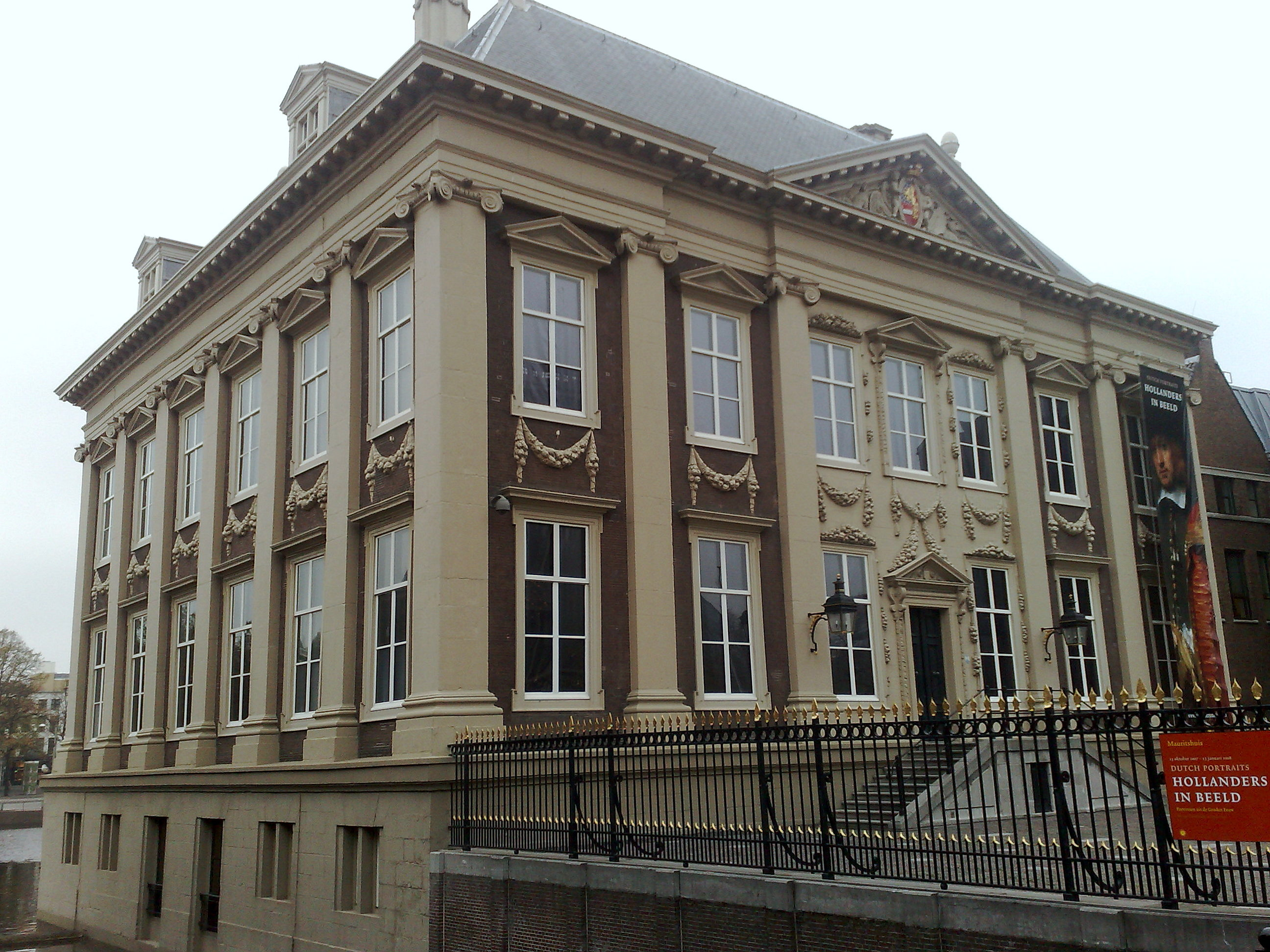
The Hague Mauritshuis

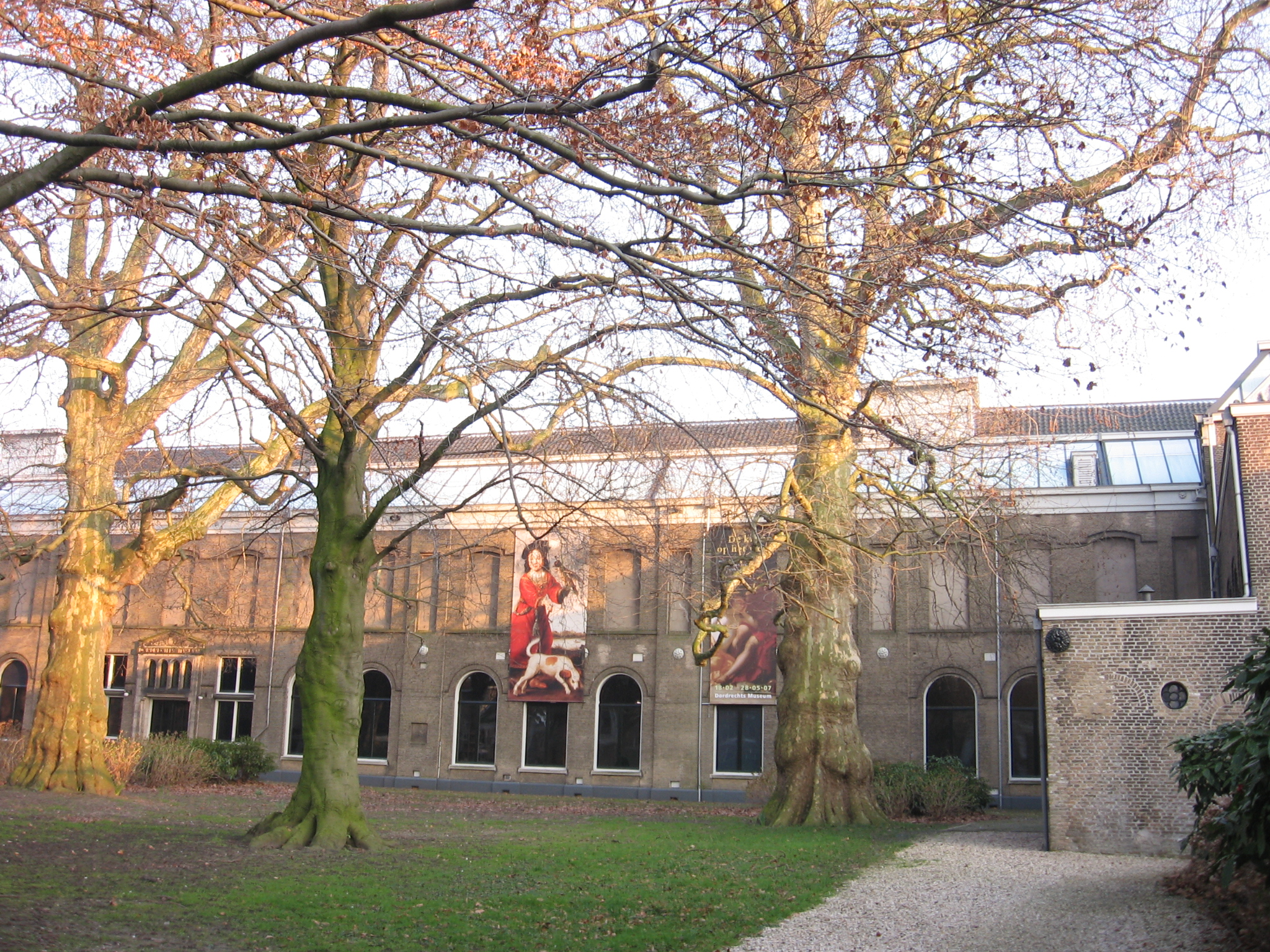
Dordrechts Museum

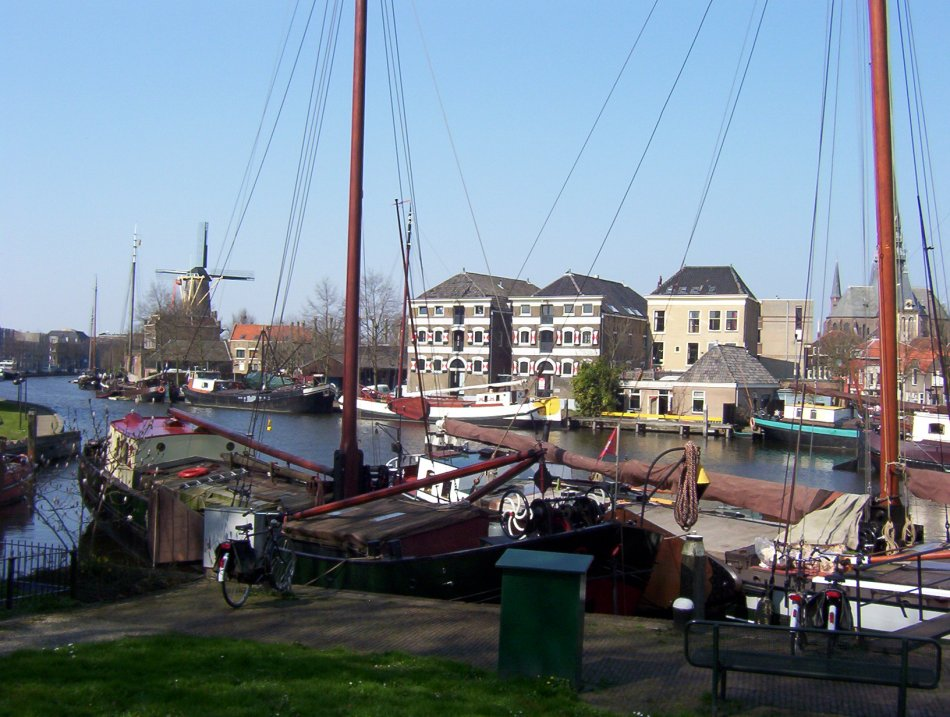
Gouda Binnenhavenmuseum

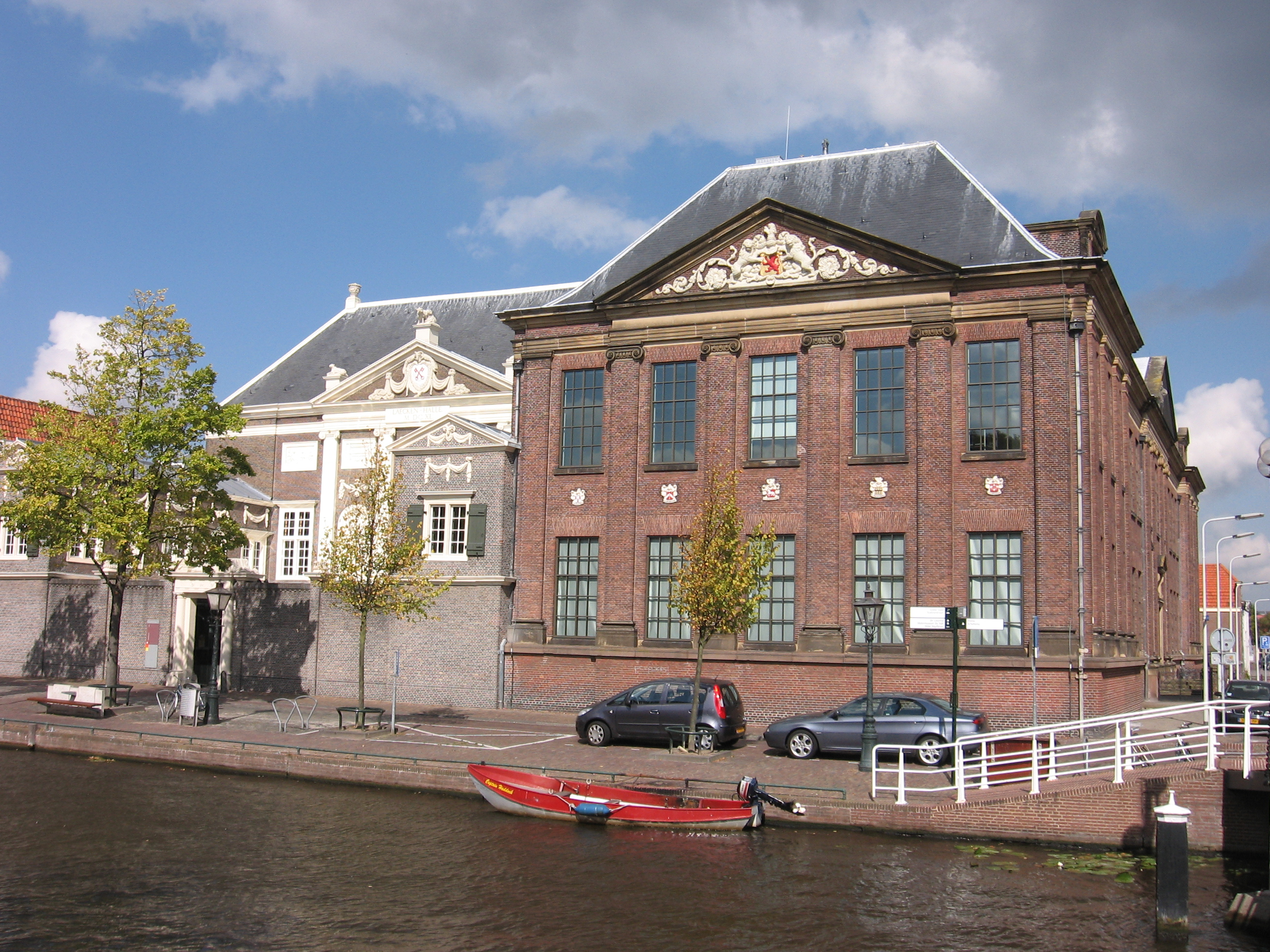
Leiden Lakenhal

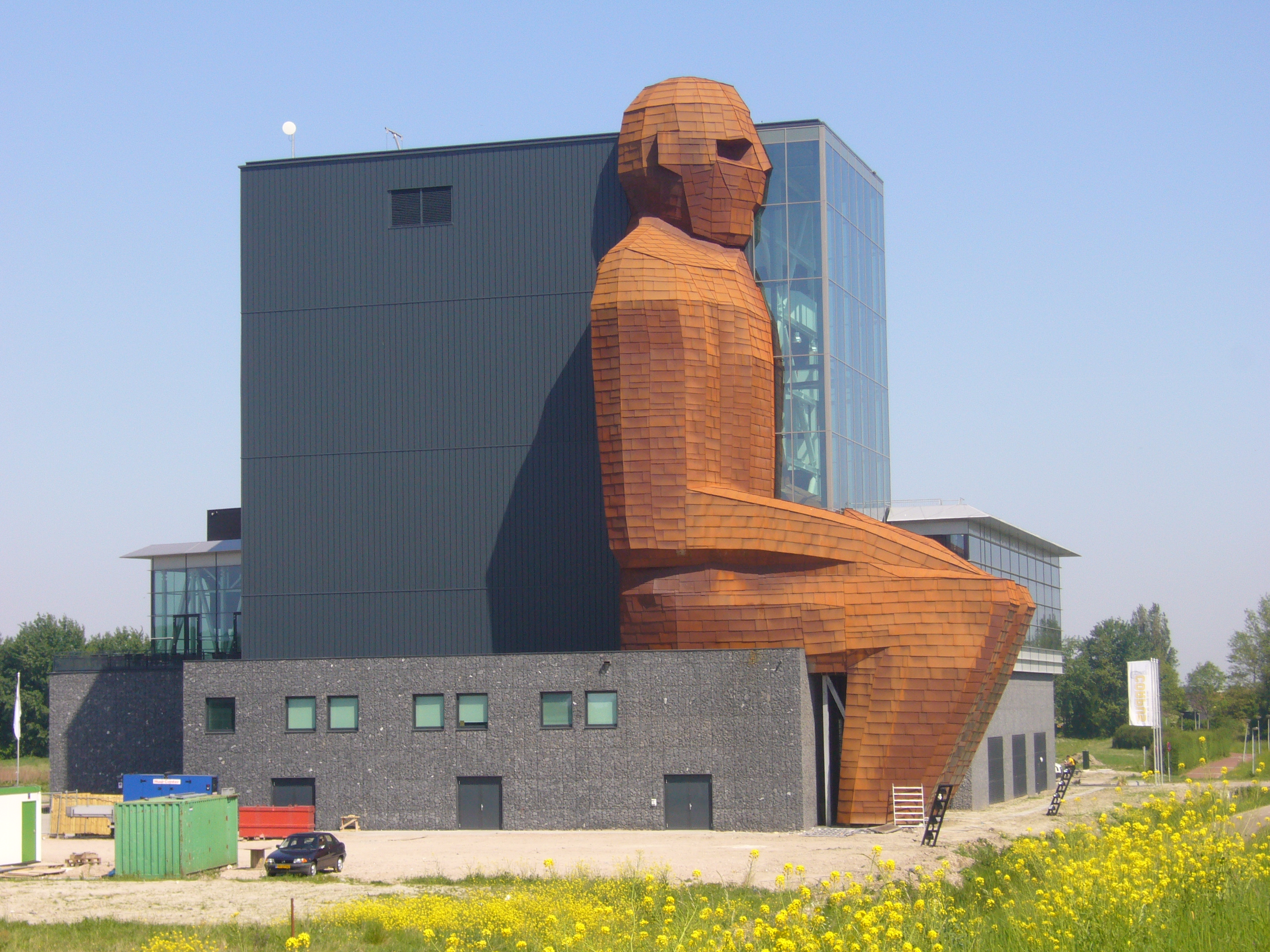
Oegstgeest Museum Corpus

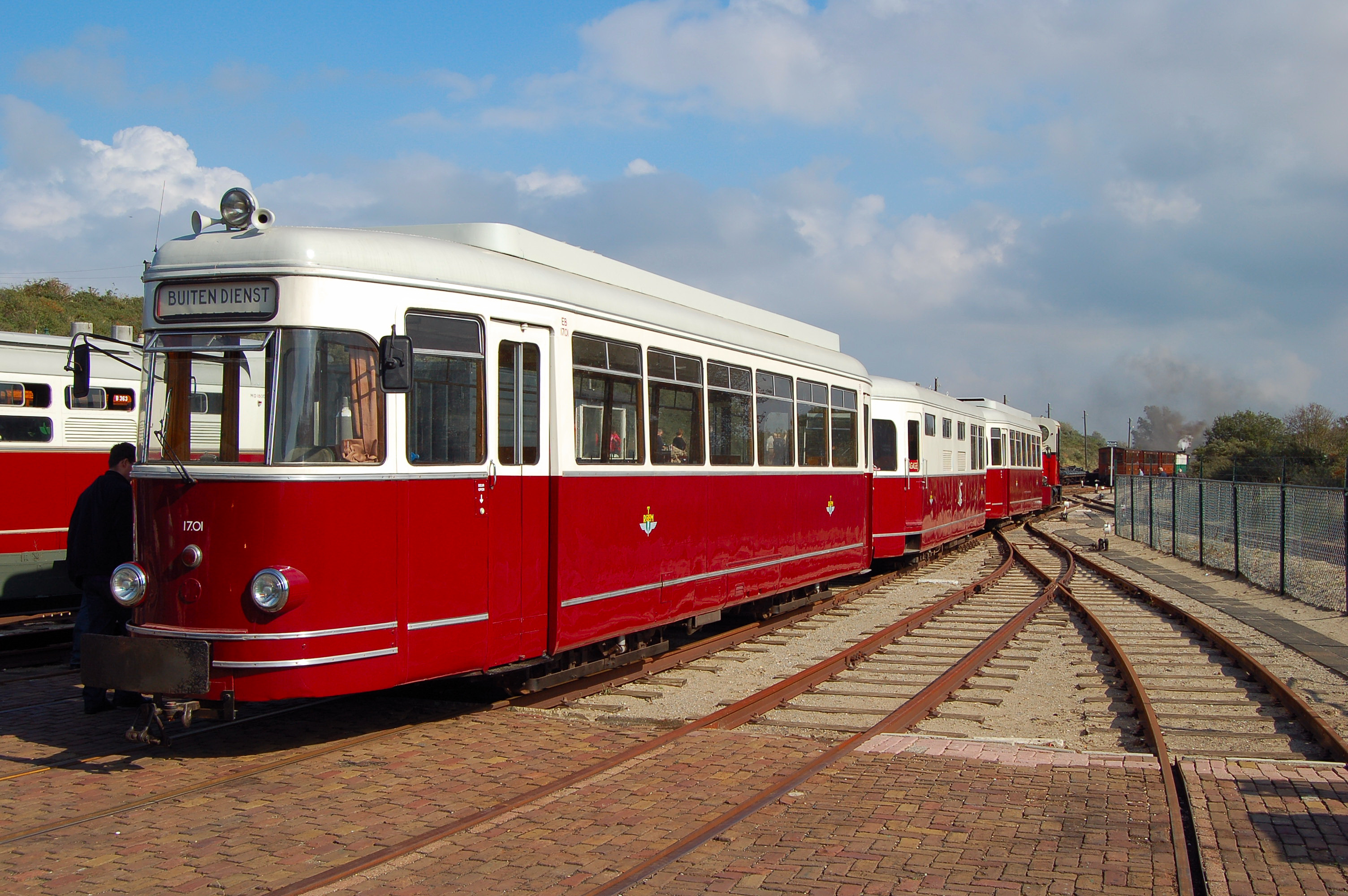
Ouddorp RTM Museum

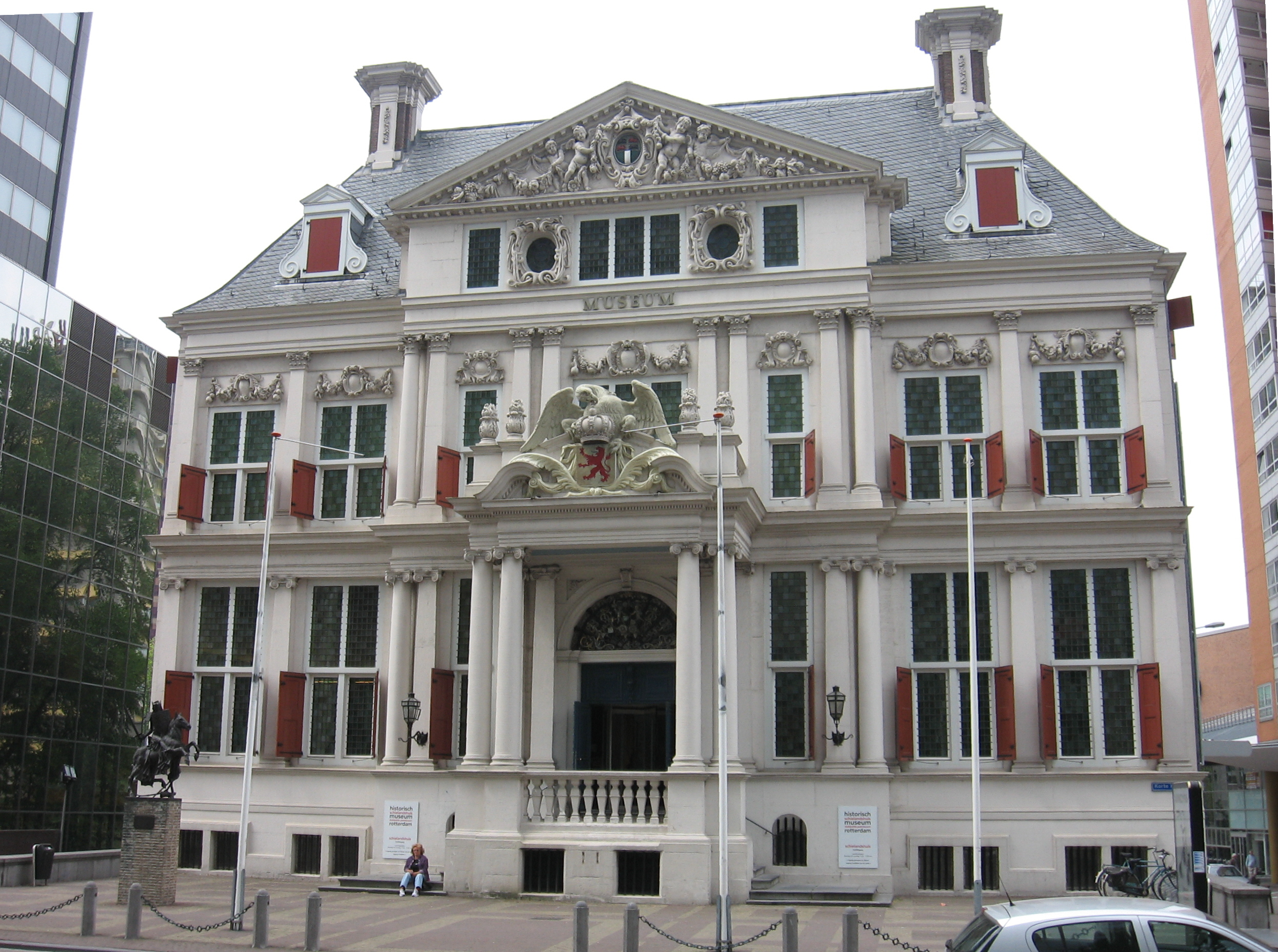
Rotterdam Schielandshuis

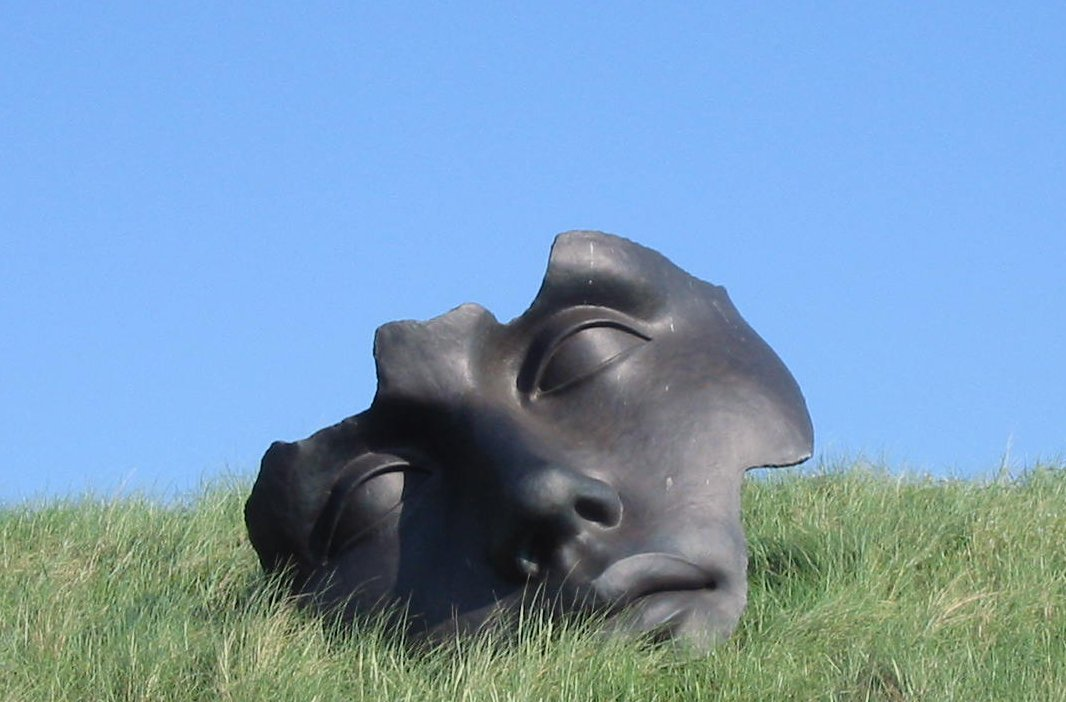
Scheveningen Beelden Aan Zee

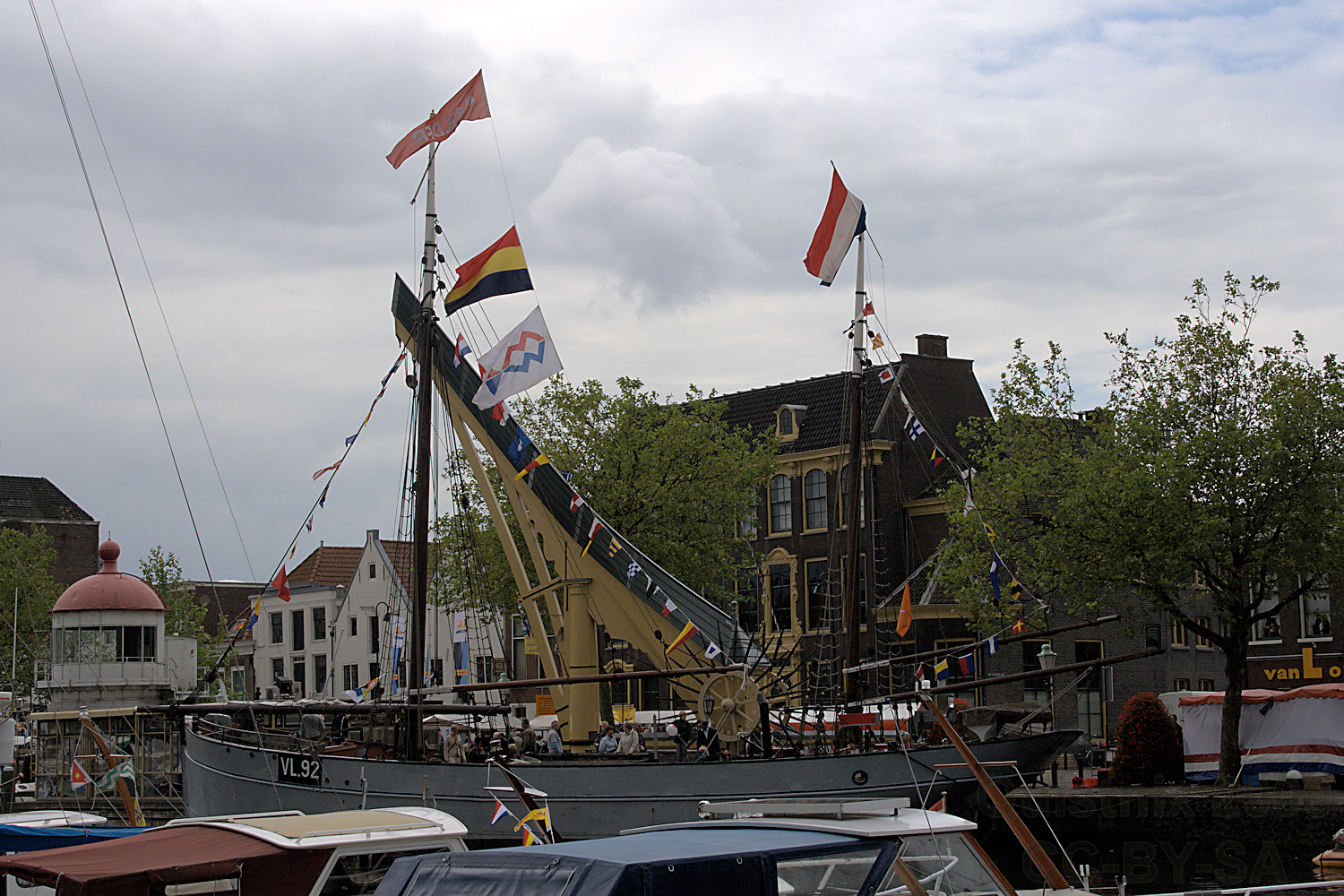
Museum Vlaardingen

=== Brielle ===
- Historisch Museum Den Briel

=== Delft ===
- De Porceleyne Fles
- Legermuseum (closed, 2013 combined with Militaire Luchtvaart Museum, now Nationaal Militair Museum, Soesterberg)
- Museum Paul Tétar van Elven
- Museum Lambert van Meerten
- Museum Nusantara (closed in 2013)
- Prinsenhof
- Vermeer Centre

=== Dordrecht ===
- Binnenvaartmuseum
- Dordrechts Museum
- Huis Van Gijn

=== Gorinchem ===
- Gorcums Museum

=== Gouda ===
- Museum De Moriaan
- MuseumgoudA, onder andere gevestigd in het voormalig Catharina Gasthuis
- Museumhaven Gouda
- Verzetsmuseum Zuid-Holland

=== Hardinxveld-Giessendam ===
- De Koperen Knop (cultuurhistorie van de Alblasserwaard)

=== Hellevoetsluis ===
- Droogdok Jan Blanken
- Nationaal Brandweermuseum
- Historyland
- Stadsmuseum Hellevoetsluis
- Marinemuseum Buffel (Museum ship)

=== Katwijk ===
- Katwijks Museum

=== Leerdam ===
- Nationaal Glasmuseum
- Hofje van Mevrouw Van Aerden

=== Leiden ===
- Academisch Historisch Museum
- Anatomisch Museum
- Museum Boerhaave (history of science and medicine)
- Hortus Botanicus Leiden
- Stedelijk Museum De Lakenhal (visual art and history)
- Naturalis (natural history)
- Rijksmuseum van Oudheden (antiquities)
- Leiden American Pilgrim Museum
- Pilgrim Archives
- SieboldHuis
- Stedelijk MolenMuseum De Valk
- Museum Volkenkunde (ethnology)
- Museum Het Leids Wevershuis
- Wagenmakersmuseum

Closed

- Het Koninklijk Penningkabinet (now the Geldmuseum in Utrecht)
- Rijksmuseum van Geologie en Mineralogie (collection is included in Naturalis)
- Rijksmuseum van Natuurlijke Historie (collection is included in Naturalis)

=== Maassluis ===
- Nationaal Sleepvaartmuseum

=== Oegstgeest ===
- Corpus

=== Ouddorp ===
- Streekmuseum Ouddorps Raad- en Polderhuis
- Stichting voorheen RTM, Punt van Goeree

=== Rotterdam ===
- Arboretum Trompenburg
- Belasting & Douane Museum
- Chabot Museum
- Dutch Pinball Museum
- Scheepswerf De Delft in Delfshaven
- FENIX
- Feyenoord Museum
- FutureLand
- Havenmuseum in the Leuvehaven nearby the Verolmepaviljoen
- Huis Sonneveld
- Houweling Telecom Museum
- Kralingsmuseum in Kralingen
- Kunsthal
- Kunstinstituut Melly
- Kunstkubus
- Nationaal Onderwijsmuseum
- Natuurhistorisch Museum Rotterdam
- Nederlands Fotomuseum
- Netherlands Marine Corps Museum
- Schaakstukkenmuseum (Chess piece museum)
- Showroom MAMA
- Maritime Museum Rotterdam in the Leuvehaven
- Museumwoning de Kiefhoek
- Museum Boijmans Van Beuningen
- Museum Overschie
- Museum Rotterdam, Containing:
  - Museum Het Schielandshuis
  - Atlas Van Stolk
  - Museum De Dubbelde Palmboom
- Rotterdamse Museumtrams (RoMeO)
- Rotterdams Openbaar Vervoer Museum
- Rotterdams Radio Museum
- Stoom Stichting Nederland (Museum Stoomdepot)
- Wereldmuseum Rotterdam
- Villa Zebra

closed

- Netherlands Architecture Institute
- Witte de With Center for Contemporary Art (now known as Kunstinstituut Melly)
- Strips! Museum
- Museum Hillesluis
- De Dubbelde Palmboom

=== Schiedam ===
- Jenevermuseum
- Museummolen De Nieuwe Palmboom
- Nationaal Coöperatie Museum Schiedam
- Stedelijk Museum Schiedam

=== Schoonhoven ===
- Zilvermuseum

=== Sommelsdijk ===
- Streekmuseum Sommelsdijk

=== Spijkenisse ===
- Museumwoning 'Back to the Sixties'

=== The Hague (Den Haag) ===
- Beelden aan Zee
- Museum Bredius
- Escher Museum
- Fotomuseum Den Haag
- Gemeentemuseum Den Haag
- Gevangenpoort
- Haags Openbaar Vervoer Museum
- Haags Historisch Museum
- Humanity House
- Kinderboekenmuseum
- Letterkundig Museum and Documentationcentre
- Louis Couperus Museum
- Louwman Museum
- Mauritshuis
- Museon
- Museum Bredius
- Museum Meermanno
- Museum Mesdag
- Museum voor Communicatie (Previous PTT museum)
- Muzee Scheveningen
- Panorama Mesdag

=== Tiengemeten ===
- Rien Poortvliet Museum

=== Tinte ===
- In den Halven Maen

=== Vlaardingen ===
- Muziekinformatie- en Documentatiecentrum Ton Stolk
- Streekmuseum Jan Anderson
- Museum Vlaardingen

=== Voorschoten ===
- Duivenvoorde Castle

=== Wassenaar ===
- Museum Voorlinden

== Caribbean Netherlands ==
=== Bonaire ===
- Museum Bonaire
- Museo di Belua
- Museum Washington Park
- Museum Kas Krioyo
- Museum Mangasina di Rey
- Museum Fort Oranje

=== Sint Eustatius ===
- Berkel's Family Museum
- Simon Doncker Museum

=== Saba ===
- Harry L. Johnson Museum
- Major Osmar Ralph Simmons Museum

== See also ==
- List of most visited museums in the Netherlands
- Museumkaart
