= EFCC =

EFCC may refer to:

- Economic and Financial Crimes Commission, a Nigerian law enforcement agency
- Evangelical Free Church of Canada, a Canadian evangelical denomination
- Evangelical Free Church of China, a Hong Kong evangelical denomination, formerly active in mainland China
- Evangelical Fellowship of Congregational Churches, a British evangelical denomination
- Ellis Fischel Cancer Center, Columbia, Missouri, U.S.
- European Federation of Clinical Chemistry and Laboratory Medicine (EFLM, formerly EFCC)

== See also ==
- EFCC1, EF-hand and coiled-coil domain containing 1, a humans gene
- Ministry of Environment, Forest and Climate Change (MoEFCC), is an Indian government ministry
