= Militaire Luchtvaart Museum =

Former aviation museum in the Netherlands

Coordinates: 52.1119°N 5.2969°E

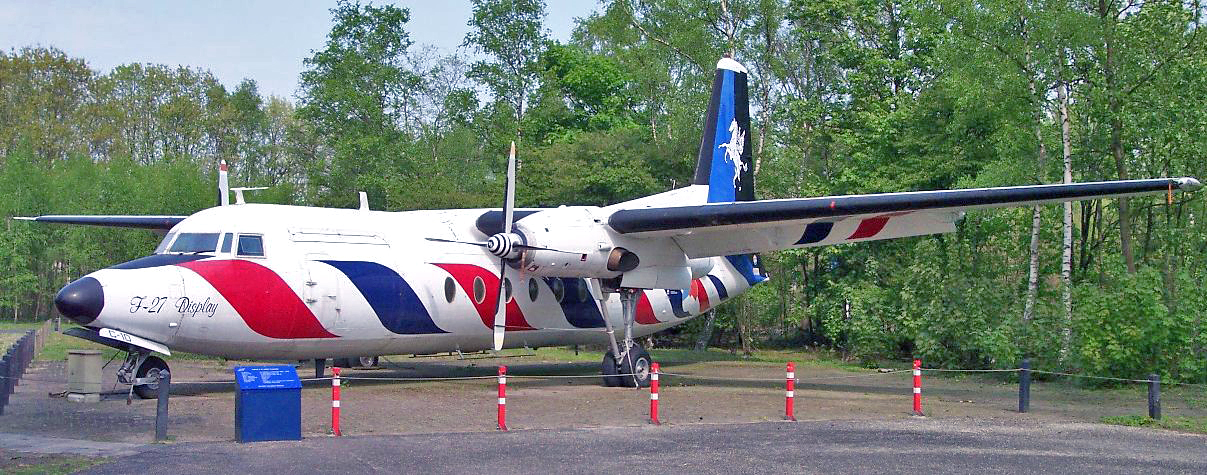
Fokker F27-300 on display at the Militaire Luchtvaart Museum

The Militaire Luchtvaart Museum was an aviation museum located at Camp Zeist, Netherlands, near the former Soesterberg Air Base. It was the official museum of the Royal Netherlands Air Force.

In 2006 the Ministry of Defence decided to merge three military museums in the Netherlands into the Nationaal Militair Museum, located at the former Soesterberg Air Base. The new museum opened in 2013.

== Collection ==
- Auster Mark III
- Bölkow Bo-105CB
- Breguet Br.1150 Atlantique
- Cessna T-37 Tweet (In storage at Soesterberg AB)
- Convair F-102A Delta Dagger
- Dornier Do 24K
- Douglas C-47 Dakota "Skytrain"
- Fokker D.VII
- Fokker D.XXI
- Fokker G.1A (replica)
- Fokker S.11 "Instructor"
- Fokker S.14 "Machtrainer"
- Fokker F27-300M Troopship
- General Dynamics F-16A
- Gloster Meteor Mk.4
- Grumman S-2A Tracker
- de Havilland DH-82 Tiger Moth
- de Havilland Dominie DH-89B
- de Havilland Canada DHC-2 Beaver
- Hawker Hunter F.Mk.4
- Hawker Sea Fury F.B.51
- Hawker Sea Hawk FGA.50
- Hiller OH-23C Raven
- Koolhoven FK.51
- Lockheed T-33A
- Lockheed 12A
- Lockheed Neptune SP 2H
- Lockheed F-104G Starfighter
- McDonnell Douglas F-4E Phantom II-34-MC s/n 67-0275, c/n 3011 (In storage at Soesterberg AB)
- McDonnell Douglas F-15A
- Mikoyan MiG-21PFM
- Northrop NF-5B
- North American P-51 Mustang
- North American B-25J Mitchell
- North American Harvard AT16
- North American F-100D Super Sabre
- North American F-86K Sabre
- Piper Super Cub L18C
- Republic F-84G Thunderjet
- Republic F-84F Thunderstreak
- Republic RF-84F Thunderflash
- Sikorsky S-58
- Sud Aviation Alouette II
- Sud Aviation Alouette III
- Sud Aviation Alouette III (SAR)
- Supermarine Spitfire LF.Mk.IX.C.

== See also ==
- List of aerospace museums
