= Paul Brombacher =

Dutch clinical chemist (1930–2020)

Brombacher at his desk in De Wever Hospital

Paul Jacob Brombacher (10 October 1930 – 2 July 2020) was a Dutch clinical chemist, professor at Maastricht University and the head clinical chemist at De Wever Hospital in Heerlen.

== Personal life ==
Paul Brombacher was born on 10 October 1930 in Rotterdam, Netherlands and he died on 2 July 2020 in Heerlen, Netherlands. His wife, Prijna Everdina Brombacher-Binnendijk was born in Noordwijk, Netherlands on 23 October 1931 and she died on 6 April 2021 in Heerlen, Netherlands. His sister, Jannie Brombacher was a major in the Royal Netherlands Army.

Paul spoke fluent Dutch, German, English, Italian, French and intermediate Spanish, Hebrew and Arabic.

== Academic career ==
In 1955, Brombacher completed a Master's degree in Chemistry with a minor in Physiology at the Free University of Amsterdam. Afterwards he worked as a clinical chemist in the Antoni van Leeuwenhoekziekenhuis (hospital) of the Netherlands Cancer Institute. In 1960, he became the head of the clinical chemistry laboratory of the Weesperplein hospital and the clinical chemistry research laboratory of the Free University of Amsterdam. In April 1964, he became the new head clinical chemist at St Joseph's Hospital (later renamed to De Wever Hospital) in Heerlen, Netherlands.

On 9 May 1975, he received a Doctor of Medicine from the Free University of Amsterdam. His research on adrenal cortex hormones took place entirely in De Wever Hospital. Despite not being funded, he continued his research during his private time due to the lack of a research budget.

In December 1994 he retired from De Wever Hospital after working there for thirty years, and later in 1995 he retired from professorship at the Rijksuniversiteit Limburg (now Maastricht University).

== Publications ==
Brombacher was the Dutch national editor of the European Journal of Clinical Chemistry and Clinical Biochemistry in 1991. He was the lead author for works in the following peer-reviewed journals:

- Clinica Chimica Acta
- Annals of Clinical Biochemistry
- Clinical Chemistry
- The Lancet
- Drug Research

== Awards ==
- 1991 he received the Gorter en De Graaff-prijs (Gorter and De Graaf Prize) for his clinical chemistry work.
- In 1994 he became an officer in the Order of Orange-Nassau.
