= Stichting Koninklijke Defensiemusea =

Dutch defense organization

The Stichting Koninklijke Defensiemusea (SKD, previously KSD; Royal Foundation for Defence Museums) is an umbrella organization managing the collections of the four main military museums in the Netherlands - the Nationaal Militair Museum (NMM) in Soesterberg, the Marinemuseum in Den Helder, the Mariniersmuseum in Rotterdam, and the Marechausseemuseum in Buren. It was set up on 1 July 2014 by the Dutch Ministry of Defence as an intermediary between the Ministry and the museums themselves. The Ministry of Defence provides an annual subsidy of 7.5 million Euros (2012 pricing levels), along with annual payments of 8.4 million Euros for 25 years to the NMM's public-private partnership, known as 'Design, Build, Finance, Maintain & Operate'.

Although they are not included in the SKD, the Ministry of Defence also has oversight of:

- over twenty smaller army museums and displays, including the Cavaleriemuseum in the Bernhardkazerne in Amersfoort, the Geniemuseum in the Van Brederodekazerne in the former Kamp Vught, and the Nederlands Artillerie Museum in 't Harde.
- the 'traditiekamers' or 'tradition rooms' on the Royal Netherlands Air and Space Force bases at Gilze-Rijen, Leeuwarden and Volkel
- The traditiekamers of the submarine service in Marinehaven Den Helder and the naval aviation service at Maritiem Vliegkamp De Kooy near Den Helder
- Museum and information centre on the colonial period in the Dutch East Indies in the Bronbeek, Arnhem
