= Jannie Brombacher =

Dutch adjutant (1931–1985)

Jannie Herma Brombacher was born on 3 December 1931 in Rotterdam, Netherlands and died on 4 October 1985 in Leiden. Her brother, Paul Brombacher, was a chemistry professor.

Jannie was a major in the Women's Department (MILVA) of the Royal Netherlands Army and served as an adjutant to Queen Beatrix in the 1980s.

Brombacher wrote in the Dutch publication Militaire Spectator, a critique of Netherlands' implementation of the Convention on the Political Rights of Women; specifically the effect on women soldiers' rights during the restructuring of the MILVA and other women units.

== Awards ==
- In 1974 she became an officer in the Order of Orange-Nassau.
- In 1984 she became an officer in the French Legion of Honour.
- Officer's Cross for Long Service (Onderscheidingsteken voor Langdurige Dienst als officier) with 25 years of service

== External ==
- Archive at Nationaal Militair Museum
