= Association for Clinical Biochemistry and Laboratory Medicine =

Association for Laboratory Medicine
- Abbreviation: LabMed
- Predecessor: Association for Clinical Biochemistry and Laboratory Medicine (ACB)
- Formation: March 28, 1953; 73 years ago
- Merger of: Association for Clinical Biochemistry; Association of Clinical Scientists in Immunology; Association of Clinical Microbiologists
- Type: National scientific society
- Purpose: Laboratory medicine advancement and trade union for clinical scientists
- Headquarters: London, SE1
- Region served: United Kingdom
- President: Ian Godber
- Past President: Katharine Hayden
- Chief Executive: Victoria Logan
- Chair of Federation of Clinical Scientists: Mike Cornes
- Main organ: Council
- Affiliations: International Federation of Clinical Chemistry and Laboratory Medicine; European Federation of Clinical Chemistry and Laboratory Medicine
- Website: labmed.org.uk

The Association for Laboratory Medicine (previously the Association for Clinical Biochemistry and Laboratory Medicine) is a United Kingdom-based learned society dedicated to the practice and promotion of laboratory medicine which consists of the clinical biochemistry, immunology and microbiology professions. It was founded on 28 March 1953 at the inaugural meeting attended by 75 members at the Hammersmith Hospital in London, and its official journal is the Annals of Clinical Biochemistry. The association is a full, national society member of the International Federation of Clinical Chemistry and Laboratory Medicine IFCC as well as a full member of the regional European Federation of Clinical Chemistry and Laboratory Medicine. Its qualifying members are automatically members of the certificated trade union called Federation of Clinical Scientists (FCS), which represents the interests of clinical scientists. Some members who meet the eligibility criteria are enrolled to the register of European Specialists in Laboratory Medicine (EuSpLM).

== History ==
Founded as the "Association of Clinical Biochemists", the association has evolved as biochemistry has changed with advances in laboratory medicine. Recognizing an increasing number of medical members, the name was changed in 2005 to "Association for Clinical Biochemistry". In 2007 the "Association of Clinical Scientists in Immunology" merged with the ACB. The membership expanded in 2010 with the merger with the "Association of Clinical Microbiologists". The broader nature of the membership contributed to its renaming as ACB in 2013. The name was abbreviated to the Association for Laboratory Medicine in 2024.

== Functions ==
LabMed is one of the world's leading professional membership organisations dedicated to the practice and promotion of clinical science. As the major body for clinical biochemistry, immunology and microbiology in the United Kingdom, it works nationally and internationally to promote the highest standards in laboratory testing and patient care. Its functions includes fostering the highest standards in laboratory medicine and patient care; using data, science and technology to support human health; trade union support for members and promoting laboratory medicine to the wider community; training, professional leadership, examples of best practice and guidance to the profession, governments, the public and media; scientific and educational initiatives, bursaries and awards.

For example, LabMed is responsible for determining the specific content for courses related to certification as a clinical biochemist in the UK. Papers published by LabMed members are related to the use of laboratories by doctors and patient health diagnostic testing in the UK. LabMed was part of a 2008 effort by a consortium to support a Scottish government initiative aimed at emphasizing the need for quality laboratory services to the practice of medicine.
