= Eberhard Havekost =

German painter (1967–2019)

- Born: 1967; Dresden
- Died: 5 July 2019 (aged 51–52)
- Education: Hochschule für Bildende Künste Dresden
- Occupation: Painter

Eberhard Havekost (1967 – 5 July 2019) was a contemporary German painter based in Berlin and Dresden, who exhibited internationally.

== Biography ==
Born in Dresden, Havekost was the son of a sculptor and a taxidermist. He completed an internship as a stonemason in 1985. In 1989, he fled to the West via Budapest and lived in Frankfurt. He studied at the Hochschule für Bildende Künste in Dresden from 1991 to 1996, where he became a master student under Professor Ralf Kerbach in 1997. In 1999 he was awarded the Karl Schmidt-Rottluff grant. He lived in Berlin and was a professor at the Kunstakademie Düsseldorf.

== Work ==
Havekost was one of a new generation of painters who used a digitalized, multimedial visual language in their work. Working from photographic sources – shots from TV and video, images culled from magazines and catalogues and his own photographs – he selected subjects ranging from anonymous buildings, trains and trailers, and modified them to make inkjet prints as the departure point for his paintings. Among the subjects which regularly recur are nature, portraits or figures, architectural interiors and exteriors, and means of transportation such as caravans, aeroplanes and automobiles. He often painted series of repetitive images to replicate the serial change of visual effect in nature. The theme of a 2007 25-part series of paintings is zensur or censorship, and the artist applies the concept of blocking or erasing something thematically or formally. Retina is a 2010 series of six oil paintings that deal with the optical perception of the world of objects and their abstraction.

In 2005, art critic David Pagel described Havekost in the Los Angeles Times as "a promising painter so deeply indebted to Richter's version of abbreviated Photorealism that it appears he has not yet come into his own". In The New York Times, Roberta Smith wrote that "the blunt dispatch and immediacy of Mr. Havekost's surfaces, while suitably laconic, run counter to the randomness and remove of the images, providing a necessary disconcerting tension."

In 1999, Eberhard Havekost created the painting Benutzeroberfläche 1 (User Interface 1). The term “user interface,” referring to the visible part of a computer system, is representative of many of his works: Havekost depicts the visible surface of things, while the underlying system remains concealed. Fundamental to Havekost’s series and individual works is the fragmentary depiction of details, through which the subjective perception of the viewer is addressed and established visual habits are questioned.

== Collection ==
Works by Havekost are found in the stock of the Museum of Modern Art, the Denver Art Museum as well as in the Marx Collection, the Rubell Family Collection, the Frieder Burda Collection, and the Tate Collection. He is represented by Anton Kern in New York and Galerie Gebr. Lehmann in Dresden and Berlin. He had solo exhibitions at the Kunsthalle Schirn in Frankfurt, Staatliche Kunstsammlungen Dresden, Kunstmuseum Wolfsburg, and the Stedelijk Museum Amsterdam.

== Art market ==
Havekost is represented by Contemporary Fine Arts in Berlin, Anton Kern Gallery in New York, Roberts Projects in Los Angeles, and White Cube in London, among many other international venues.

== Solo exhibitions ==
- 2026 Benutzeroberflächen. Arbeiten 1994-2019, Museum Kurhaus, Kleve
- 2024 Havekost meets: Hermann Glöckner (with Hermann Glöckner), Galerie Gebr. Lehmann, Dresden
- 2023 Eberhard Havekost: Paintings 1998-1016, Anton Kern Gallery, New York
- 2019 Eberhard Havekost Portrait, Stiftung Schmidt-Drenhaus, Köln
- 2019 U Say Love, Contemporary Fine Arts, Berlin
- 2017 Logik, Galerie Rudolfinum, Prag
- 2016 Expulsion from Paradise Freeze, Anton Kern Gallery, New York
- 2016 Inhalt, KINDL-Zentrum für zeitgenössische Kunst
- 2015 Natur, Galerie Gebr. Lehmann, Dresden
- 2013 Titel, MKM Museum Küppersmühle für Moderne Kunst, Duisburg
- 2012 Eberhard Havekost. Die Sammlung MAP, Museum der Moderne, Salzburg
- 2012 Sightseeing Trip, Dr. Bhau Daj Lad, Mumbay City Museum, Mumbai
- 2011 Take Care, Roberts Projects, LA
- 2010 Ausstellung, Kunsthalle im Lipsius Bau, SKD, Dresden
- 2008 Eberhard Havekost, FRAC Auvergne
- 2008 Zensur 2, Galerie Gebr. Lehmann, Dresden/Berlin
- 2007 Zensur, Anton Kern Gallery, New York
- 2007 Background, White Cube, London
- 2006 Paintings from the Rubell Family Collection, American University Museum, Katzen Arts Center, Washington DC
- 2006 Harmony 2, Stedelijk Museum Amsterdam
- 2006 backstage, Galerie Gebr. Lehmann, Dresden
- 2005 Sonnenschutz, Roberts & Tilton, Los Angeles
- 2004 Brandung, Galerie Gebr. Lehmann, Dresden
- 2004 Graphik 1999-2004, Kupferstich-Kabinett Dresden
- 2004 Marvel, Anton Kern Gallery, New York
- 2003 Centre d`art contemporain Georges Pompidou, Cajarc
- 2003 dynamic UND, Inside the White Cube, London
- 2003 Beauty walks a razors edge, Galerie Gebr. Lehmann, Dresden
- 2003 Square, Anton Kern Gallery, New York
- 2001 DRIVER, Museu de Arte Contemporanea de Serralves, Porto
- 2001 Dimmer, Galerie Gebr. Lehmann, Dresden
- 2001 Pressure-Pressure, Anton Kern Gallery, New York
- 2000 Kontakt, Galerie Gebr. Lehmann, Dresden
- 1999 Statements, Art Basel, Basel
- 1998 ZOOM, Anton Kern Gallery, New York
- 1998 Fenster-Fenster, Kunstmuseum Luzern
- 1997 Frieren, Galerie Gebr. Lehmann, Dresden
