= CFAP92 =

Protein-coding gene in the species Homo sapiens

Identifiers
- Aliases: CFAP92, cilia and flagella associated protein 92 (putative), KIAA1257, FAP92
- External IDs: HomoloGene: 131623; GeneCards: CFAP92; OMA:CFAP92 - orthologs

Gene location (Human)
Chr.	Chromosome 3 (human)
Band	3q21.3	Start	128,909,866 bp
Band	3q21.3	End	129,002,690 bp
RNA expression pattern
Bgee	Human / Mouse (ortholog); Top expressed in: left testis; right testis; sperm; testicle; secondary oocyte; gonad; right uterine tube; olfactory zone of nasal mucosa; blood; islet of Langerhans / n/a; More reference expression data
BioGPS	n/a
Orthologs
Species	Human	Mouse
Entrez	57501	n/a
Ensembl	ENSG00000114656	n/a
UniProt	Q9ULG3	n/a
RefSeq (mRNA)	NM_020741; NM_001348520; NM_001348521; NM_001348522; NM_001348523 NM_001394090	n/a
RefSeq (protein)	NP_065792; NP_001335449; NP_001335450; NP_001335451; NP_001335452	n/a
Location (UCSC)	Chr 3: 128.91 – 129 Mb	n/a
PubMed search		n/a
- Wikidata
View/Edit Human

Uncharacterized protein CFAP92 is a protein that in humans is encoded by the gene CFAP92 (previously KIAA1257). While the function of CFAP92 remains unclear, some early research has suggested it may activate steroidogenic factor 1 (also known as NR5A1), a multifunctional transcription factor involved in the development of adrenal and gondal tissues.

== Gene ==
In humans the gene KIAA1257 is located on chromosome 3q21.3. It spans 122 kilobasepairs (kBp) and contains 22 exons. It is flanked by Ras-related protein Rab-43 and several pseudogenes and on the opposite strand Acyl CoA dehydrogenase family member 9 (ACAD9) and EF-hand and coiled-coil domain containing 1 (EFCC1).

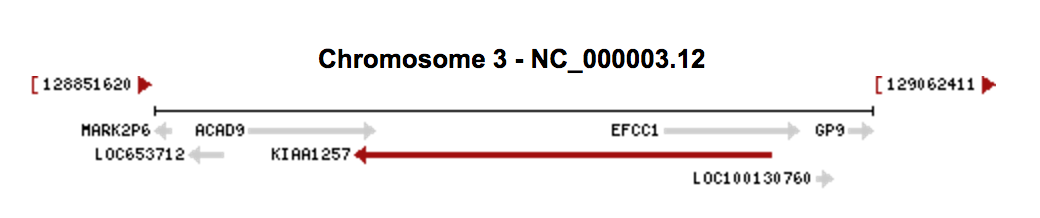
KIAA1257 genetic locus

== Transcripts ==
The exons of KIAA1257 are alternatively spliced into 17 different isoforms (Table 1). Isoform X1 encodes the longest protein product and isoform X4 is the most common variant translated. Both the 5' and 3' UTR's are capable of forming stem loop structures that could serve as binding site for RNA-binding proteins.

Isoform	Length (bp)
X1	8645
X2	8641
X3	8218
X4	8612
X5	8370
X6	8190
X7	3524
X8	3428
X9	7801
X10	7685
X11	7862
X12	7809
X13	13296
X14	13401
X15	7579
X16	7585
X17	2163

Table 1

== Protein ==
The protein KIAA1257 exists most commonly as a translation of the mRNA isoform X4, which is only half the length of isoform X1's product even though they have similar mRNA lengths. Protein isoform X1 is 1179 amino acids long, has a molecular weight of 136.4 kilodaltons (kDa) and an isoelectric point (pI) of 8.1. KIAA1257 contains a domain of unknown function (DUF) 4550 in the first third of the protein sequence that has a high lysine content (15%). Most of the protein exists in a random coil structure but the final thirds contains 6 predicted alpha helices. KIAA1257 is predicted to be localized to the nucleus and contains several nuclear localization signals. A summary of KIAA1257 orthologs is shown below.

Species	Identity	Length	MW	pI	Localization (confidence)
Human	100%	1179	136.4	8.1	Nucleus (73.9%)
Chimp	97%	1147	131.7	8.5	Nucleus (65.2%)
Dog	69%	1163	133.6	8.9	Nucleus (82.6%)
Turkey	39%	1174	132.0	8.5	Nucleus (65.2%)
Spotted gar	36%	1320	148.2	7.7	Nucleus (73.9%)

Table 2

== Expression and Regulation ==
KIAA1257 is mainly expressed in the testes and ovaries of adult humans, however expression is low in these tissues. KIAA1257 is most highly expressed during the earliest stages of development. Expression is the highest in the 2 through 8 cell stages of embryonic development and begins to decline steadily after morula and then blastocyst formation.

KIAA1257 has a promoter region upstream of the 5' UTR with several transcription factor binding sites including a Sox11 binding site. Sox11 is involved in the regulation of many developmental genes.

== Clinical Significance ==
KIAA1257 has been shown to activate expression of Nuclear receptor subfamily 5 group A member 1 (NR5A1). NR5A1 is involved in sex determination and defects in the gene are related to XY sex reversal.

== Homology ==
KIAA1257 is found in all vertebrates except for cartilaginous and jawless fishes. KIAA1257 orthologs in birds, fish, and reptiles have 30-40% identity with humans while mammals such as goats, cats, and dogs have 60-70% identity and primates have 85-99% identity.

Species	Identity	Cover	Length
Human	100%	100%	1179
Chimp	97%	99%	1147
Dog	69%	92%	1163
Prairie deer mouse	67%	93%	1164
Goat	61%	75%	931
Common shrew	58%	53%	660
Brown spotted pit viper	36%	77%	1080
Nile tilapia	34%	84%	1050

Table 3
