= CCLM =

CCLM may refer to:

- Clinical Chemistry and Laboratory Medicine, a scientific journal
- Coordinating Council of Literary Magazines, former name for "Council of Literary Magazines and Presses", an American organization of independent literary publishers and magazines
