= Lab Tests Online =

Lab Tests Online is a family of peer-reviewed non-profit web resources about clinical laboratory testing. The site provides information on clinical laboratory tests as well as conditions that are managed or diagnosed by lab tests. Lab Tests Online also provides summaries of recommendations by age, feature articles on lab-related topics, and news items of patient interest. All contents are reviewed and approved by an Editorial Review Board composed of laboratory professionals before being posted to the site.

== History and development ==
The first site was launched in 2001 by the American Association for Clinical Chemistry, the scientific society for clinical laboratory science. This led to a collaboration with professional societies in 17 other countries representing the laboratory medicine community. Each site is separately managed to allow both appropriate languages and information that matches local needs.

=== USA ===
In January 2021, AACC’s Lab Tests Online (labtestsonline.org) was acquired by OneCare Media. In November 2021, LabTestsOnline.org was rebranded to Testing.com.

=== UK ===
The UK site is provided by the Association for Laboratory Medicine. It provides contextual hyperlinks from individual reports to the appropriate support information on the site. This is in routine use from one of the major suppliers of clinical informations systems in primary care and from the English NHS app.

=== Australia ===
The Australian site is now known as Pathology Tests Explained.
