= Marechaussee Museum =

Museum in Netherlands

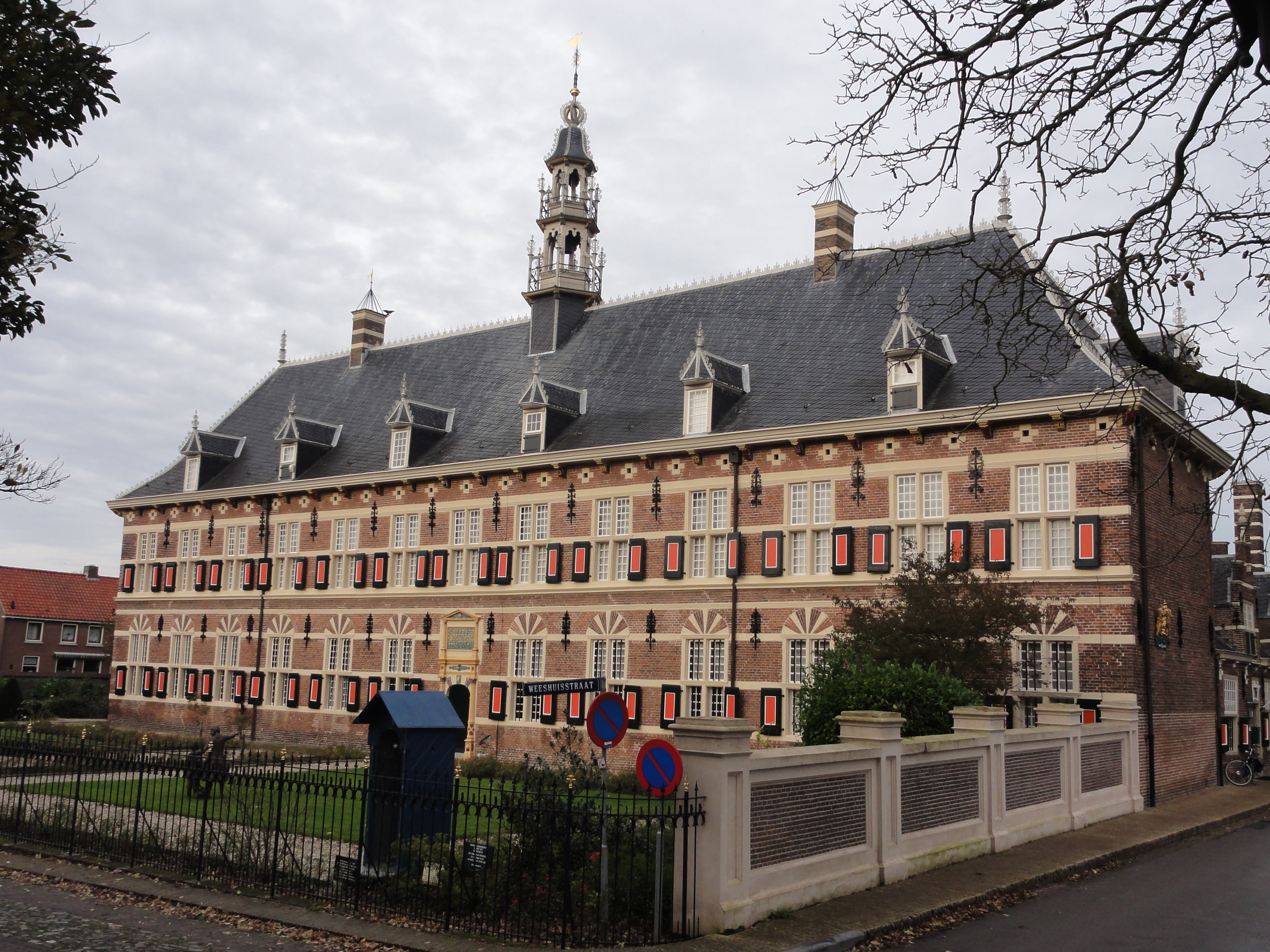
- The Museum in Buren.
- Established: 1936; 90 years ago
- Location: Koninklijk Weeshuis; Buren; Netherlands
- Coordinates: 51°54′42.66″N 5°20′11.94″E
- Website: www.marechausseemuseum.nl

The Marechaussee Museum (Dutch - Marechausseemuseum) or Royal Marechaussee Museum (Museum der Koninklijke Marechaussee) is a museum on the history of the Royal Marechaussee of the Netherlands from its foundation by William I of the Netherlands on 26 October 1814 until the present day. It is based in the former Koninklijk Weeshuis in Buren, originally opened as an orphanage on 26 May 1612 by Maria van Nassau and remaining in that role until 1953.

It is the oldest police museum in the Netherlands and on 7 December 2005 was added to the 'Museumregister Nederland'. It and four other major Dutch military museums are overseen by the Koninklijke Stichting Defensiemusea.

== History ==
It was set up by M.C. van Houten (colonel of the Royal Marechaussee) as the 'Royal Marechaussee historical museum' (historisch museum der Koninklijke Marechaussee) in Apeldoorn, opening on 31 October 1936. The initial core of the museum collection was Van Houten's own private collection. After 1945 the museum was housed in both the Leger en Wapen museum 'Generaal Hoefer' (of which Van Houten was then director) and the Pesthuis in Leiden. It was then moved to the Koninklijke Stallen (Royal Stables) in The Hague (1957-1959) and then to the top floor of the Marechausseebrigade buildings at 12 Westersingel in Rotterdam (19 March 1959 – 10 April 1972). It has been in its present home since 10 April 1972, rented from its owners on the condition that part of the displays still told the history of the orphanage. A nearby former municipal sports hall was purchased in 2000 and opened on 12 April 2003 as a vehicles display space.

== Displays ==
Display topics include brigades, brigade offices, brigade stables, vehicles, commanders, inspectors, other historical figures, the BSB and former organisations such as the Korps Politietroepen, the Rijksveldwacht, the Gemeenteveldwacht, the Rijkspolitie and the Gemeentepolitie. As well as displays on the Marechaussee, part of the top floor and three ground floor rooms (the Regentenkamer, Burenkamer and the main hall) also tell the history of the orphanage itself.
