= Royal Marechaussee =

One of the services of the armed forces of the Netherlands

Royal Marechaussee Koninklijke Marechaussee
- Emblem of the Royal Marechaussee

- Flag of the Royal Marechaussee

- Logo of the Royal Marechaussee
- Abbreviation: KMar
- Motto: Als het erop aan komt When it comes down to it

Agency overview
- Formed: 26 October 1814
- Employees: 8,875 personnel (2025)

Jurisdictional structure
- National agency (Operations jurisdiction): Kingdom of the Netherlands
- Operations jurisdiction: Kingdom of the Netherlands
- Legal jurisdiction: As per operations jurisdiction
- Governing body: Ministry of Defence
- Constituting instrument: Royal Decree of 1954
- General nature: Gendarmerie
- Specialist jurisdictions: National border patrol, security, integrity; Protection of international or domestic VIPs, protection of significant state assets

Operational structure
- Headquarters: The Hague
- Military personnels: 6,758 (2023)
- Civil servants: 826 (2023)
- Agency executive: Lieutenant general Roger Costongs, Commander
- Parent agency: Ministry of defence

Website
- english.marechaussee.nl

The Royal Marechaussee (Dutch: Koninklijke Marechaussee, abbreviated to KMar) also translated as the Royal Military Constabulary, is the national gendarmerie force of the Netherlands, performing military and civilian police duties. It is also one of the two national police forces in the Netherlands, alongside the National Police Corps, and is one of the four branches of the Netherlands Armed Forces.

== History ==
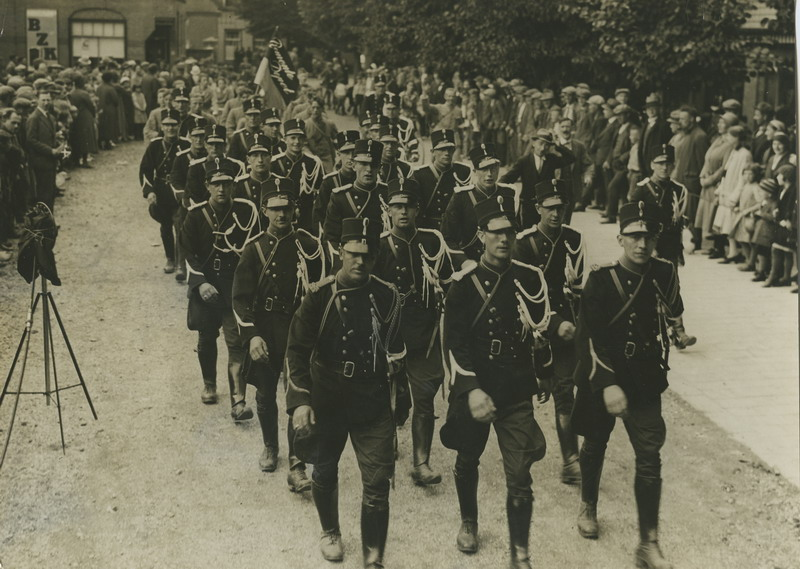
A Marechaussee detachment at Wijchen in 1938

The Corps de Maréchaussée was created by King William I to replace the French Gendarmerie on 26 October 1814. The word gendarmerie had gained a negative connotation, so William called the new force "marechaussée" (he forgot the first acute accent in the document). Maréchaussée is an alternate French word for gendarmerie. In the French historical context, "Maréchaussée" had been the force's name under the Royal Ancien Regime, while the term "gendarmerie" had been adopted by the French Revolution - making the Royalist term preferable for the Dutch King.

At that time, the Marechaussee was a part of the army (landmacht). The Marechaussee was tasked with maintaining public order, law enforcement, and safeguarding the main roads. Although not specifically mentioned, this included police duties for the army. As such, the Marechaussee was part of the national police (rijkspolitie).

The Marechaussee was the only police force in many small municipalities, such as Venlo, especially in the southern provinces of Limburg and North Brabant (former Generality Lands).

In 1908, Queen Wilhelmina assigned the Marechaussee the task of guarding the royal palaces, which had previously been done by gardeners. To this day, guarding a palace is called "klompendienst" (clog service).

After Kristallnacht in November 1938, the Dutch government officially closed its borders to any Jewish refugees. The Dutch Marechaussee border guards searched for them and returned any found to Germany, despite the horrors of Kristallnacht being well known. In 1939 Nicholas Winton succeeded with his Kindertransport, thanks to the guarantees he had obtained from Britain. After the first train, the process of crossing the Netherlands went smoothly.

On 5 July 1940, the German occupation government merged the Marechaussee with the rijksveldwacht and the gemeenteveldwacht. This meant that the Marechaussee lost its military status and the predicate Royal. These changes did not apply to the Marechaussee outside occupied Dutch territory. About 200 marechaussees guarded the Royal Family and the Dutch government-in-exile, and provided military police services to the Princess Irene Brigade, a brigade formed in the United Kingdom, consisting of Dutchmen.

After World War II, the Marechaussee was split into a Korps Rijkspolitie (National Police Corps) (as a replacement of the rijksveldwacht and the gemeenteveldwacht) and the Royal Marechaussee, which regained its military status. The main tasks for the Marechaussee since then have been border protection, military police and guard duties.

On 3 July 1956, Princess Beatrix became patroness of the Royal Marechaussee.

In 1994, the national and municipal police forces were merged into 25 regional police forces and the Korps landelijke politiediensten (National Police Services Agency). The National Police transferred its airport police and security tasks (primarily Schiphol) to the Marechaussee.

In 1998, the Marechaussee became a separate Service within the armed forces.

In 2014, a team of 40 Marechausee officers went to eastern Ukraine to assist the investigation into the shooting down of Malaysian airliner MH17. They provided security for the international team and assistance in collecting evidence from the crash site.

== Emblem ==
The emblem of the Royal Marechaussee is, as with many other gendarmerie forces, the flaming grenade. In the 17th century, a new weapon was introduced in Europe: the hand grenade. The soldiers who handled grenades were called grenadiers. They became an elite type of soldier in all European armies. In France, the grenade symbol was adopted by the gendarmerie, and this was imitated by similar forces throughout Europe.

The flaming grenade (but in this case within an eight-pointed star) was also the emblem of the Rijkspolitie.

== Tasks ==
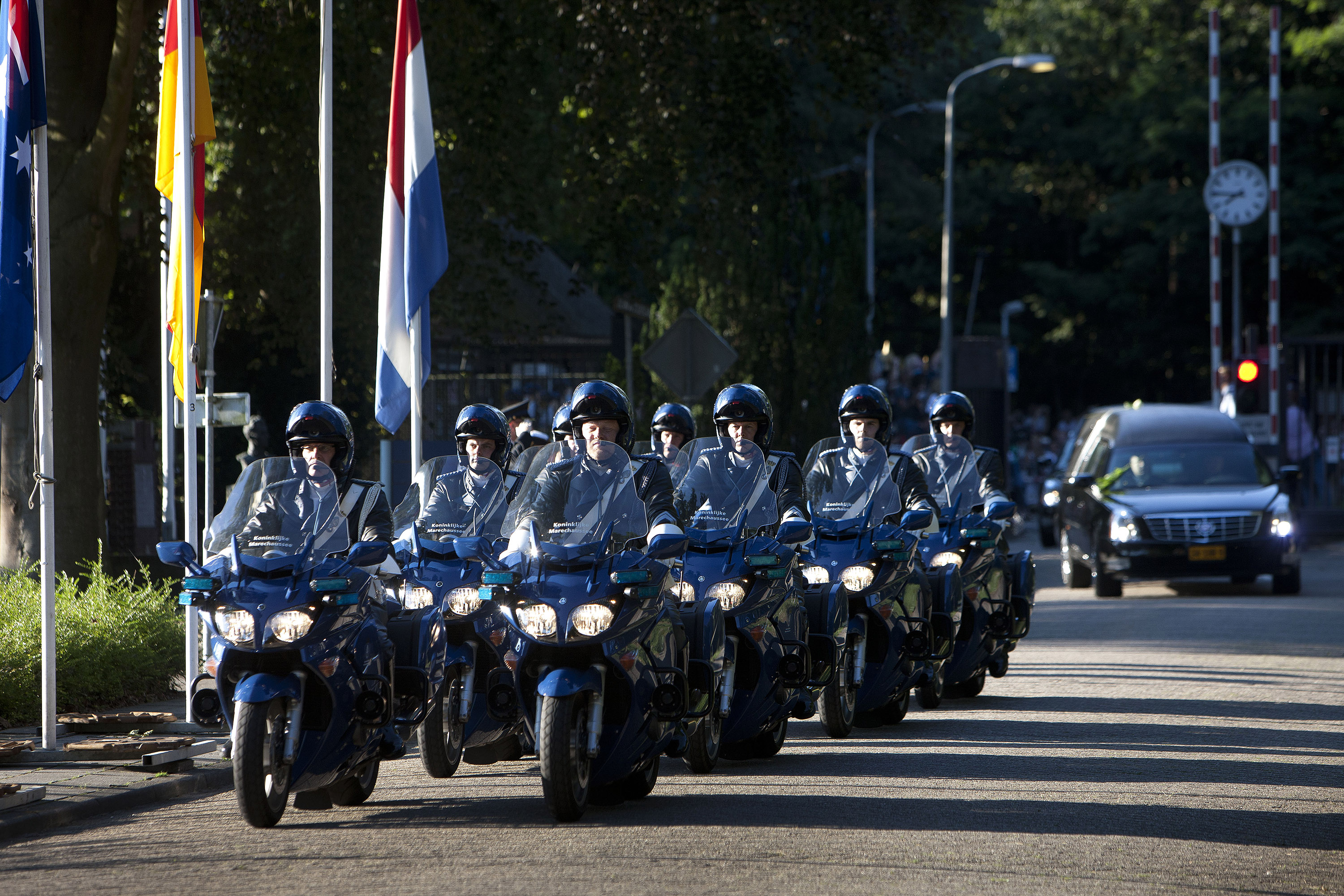
Members of the Marechaussee escorting victims of Malaysia Airlines Flight 17

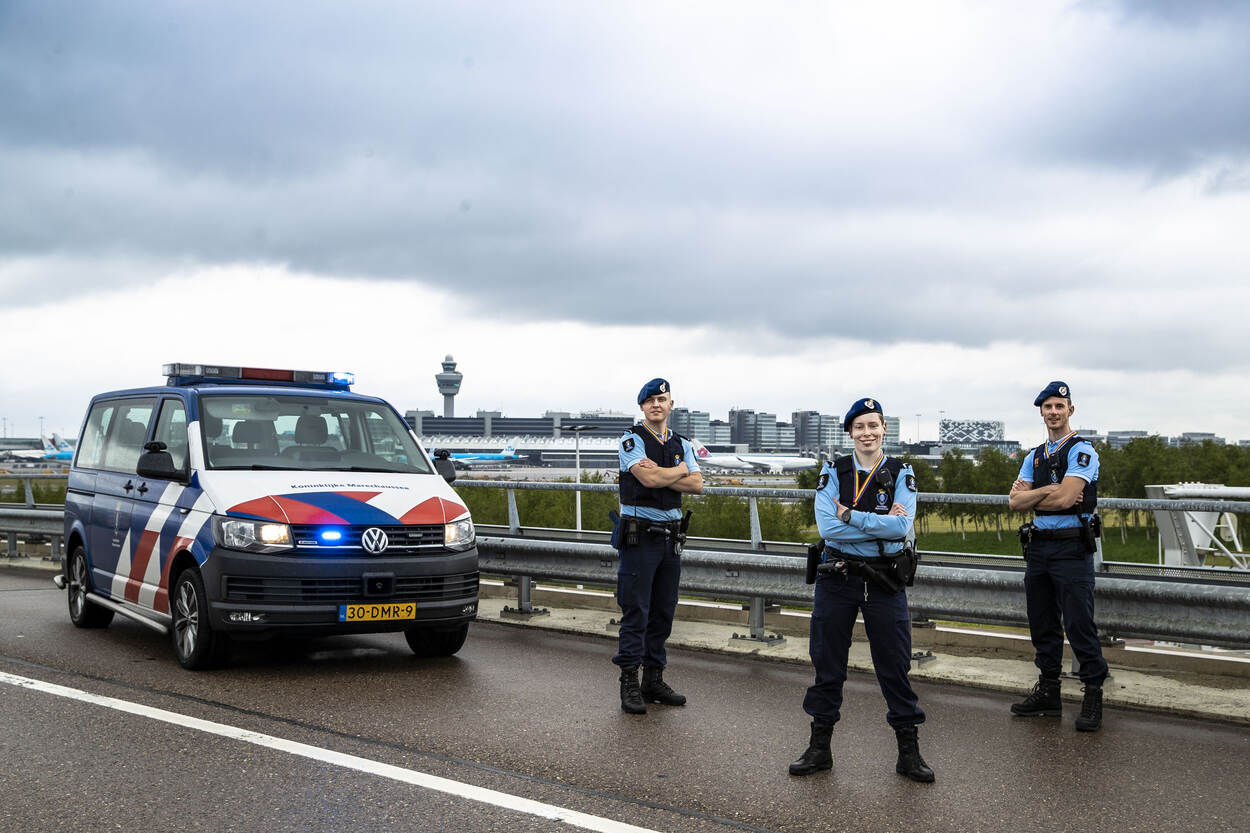
Marechaussee patrol car and officers

The present Marechaussee is a police organisation with a military status, under the jurisdiction of the Ministry of Defense, but mostly working for the Ministry of Security and Justice and the Ministry of the Interior and Kingdom Relations. The KMar performs the following duties:

- Assistance to and replacement of the National Police and territorial police forces of Overseas territories of the Kingdom
- Fighting illegal immigration
- Fighting international crime
- Guarding the national borders
- Guarding the royal palaces and the house of the Prime Minister
- Military police functions for the Dutch Armed Forces
- Riot control and protection
- Security and police work at all civilian airports, notably Schiphol Airport
- VIP close protection including the Royal Family and high-ranking government officials
- Special Protection Assignments Brigade (BSB), special forces for arrests, surveillance and protection
- KMOO, the Military Police Service

The first four units are territorial; the other two have national rather than regional responsibilities.

== Organization ==
The Royal Marechaussee includes:

- 25 territorial brigades (one of them is stationed on Curaçao);
- Special Security Missions Brigade (BSB) which includes security, observation and arrest teams;
- High Risk Security Platoons, which guard sites that are most likely to be the targets of attacks;
- Criminal Intelligence Team, which gathers information about serious crimes, mostly through informants;
- Identity Fraud and Documents Centre of Expertise and ID Desks (ECID);
- Mounted Brigade, which performs both operational and ceremonial tasks;
- National Centre for Training and Expertise.

== Future ==
In a 2020 interview, Commander of the Royal Marechaussee Hans Leijtens laid out the future direction of the Royal Marechaussee. He said that the Royal Marechaussee wants to better define its tasks so that they can be carried out in a targeted manner. Additionally he wanted the Royal Marechaussee to be deployed only as teams of personnel in the future and not as individuals. Additionally he wanted the Royal Marechaussee to update equipment so it kept up with new technological developments. To this end, the Gewapende Beveiliging Burgerluchtvaart (Armed Civil Aviation Security) and the Hoog Risico Beveiliging (High Risk Security) units have been equipped with new ballistic vests, and the YPR-765 infantry fighting vehicle is being replaced with the Iveco Medium Tactical Vehicle. Dutch Defense Vehicles (DDV) is also working on a mobile command post and a mobile interrogation room, both based on the Iveco Daily. DDV calls these vehicles AthenA.

== Ranks ==
Officer ranks

NATO code	OF-10	OF-9	OF-8	OF-7	OF-6	OF-5	OF-4	OF-3	OF-2	OF-1
Royal Marechaussee
Royal Marechaussee			Luitenant-generaal	Generaal-majoor	Brigade-generaal	Kolonel	Luitenant-kolonel	Majoor	Kapitein	Eerste-luitenant	Tweede-luitenant

Other ranks

NATO code	OR-9	OR-8	OR-7	OR-6	OR-5	OR-4	OR-3	OR-2	OR-1
Royal Marechaussee
Royal Marechaussee	Adjudant-onderofficier		Opperwachtmeester	Wachtmeester der 1e klasse	Wachtmeester	Marechaussee der 1e klasse	Marechaussee der 2e klasse	Marechaussee der 3e klasse	Marechaussee der 4e klasse

=== Cadet ranks at the Royal Military Academy ===
NATO code	OF(D)	Student officer
NATO code	OF(D)	OR-5	OR-4	OR-3	OR-1
	5th year	4th year	3rd year	2nd year	1st year
Royal Marechaussee
Royal Marechaussee	Kornet	Cadet Wachtmeester	Cadet Marechaussee der 1e klasse	Cadet Marechaussee der 2e klasse	Cadet Marechaussee der 4e klasse

== Equipment ==
- Colt Canada C8NLD
- Glock 17
- Heckler & Koch HK416
- Heckler & Koch MP5
- FN MAG (only on AIFV armoured vehicles)

== Spelling ==
In the course of time the two acute accents of the French spelling (Maréchaussée) were dropped. The lowest ranking personnel are referred to as marechaussees (without the capital M), a rank comparable to lance corporal and corporal.

== Gallery ==
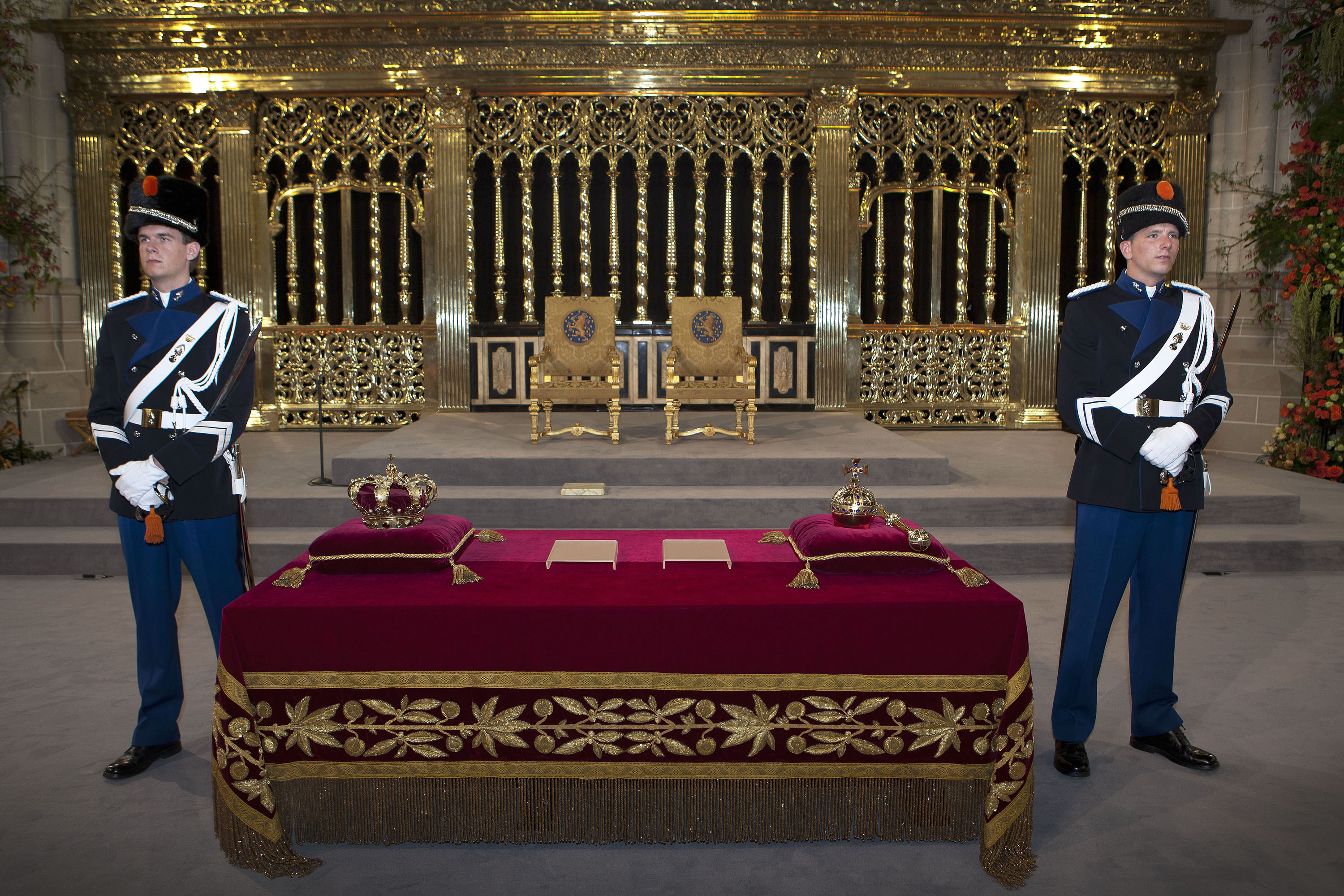
Two marechaussee guards protecting the Dutch Crown Jewels

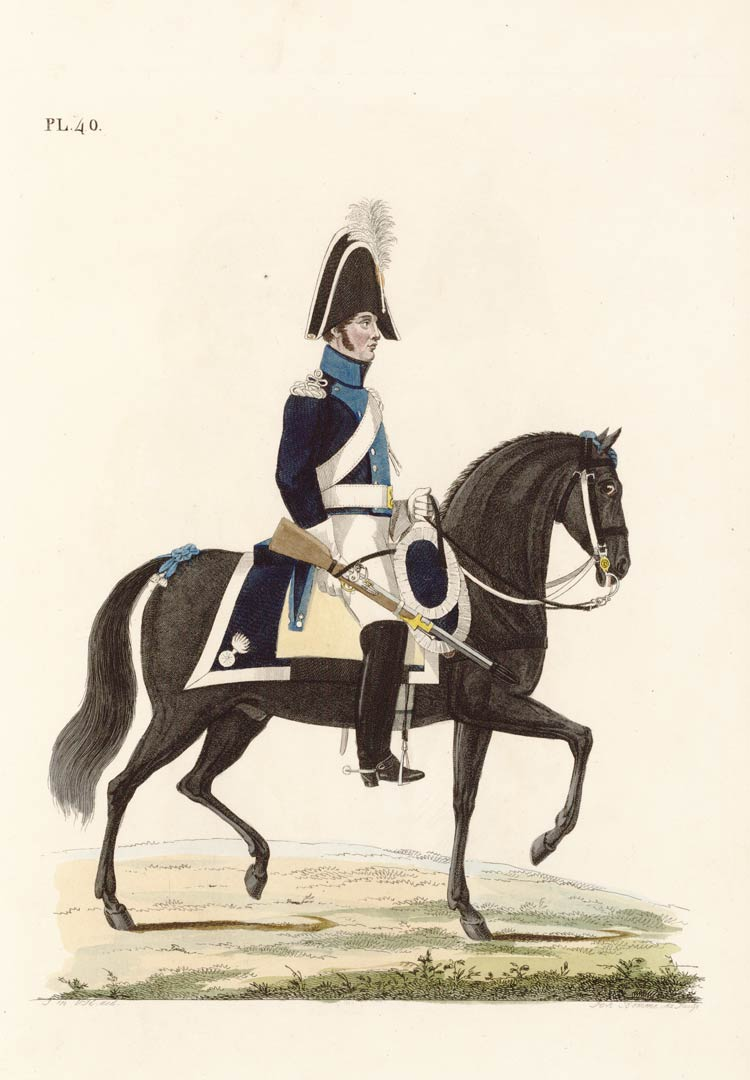
Marechaussee mounted on a horse, 1823

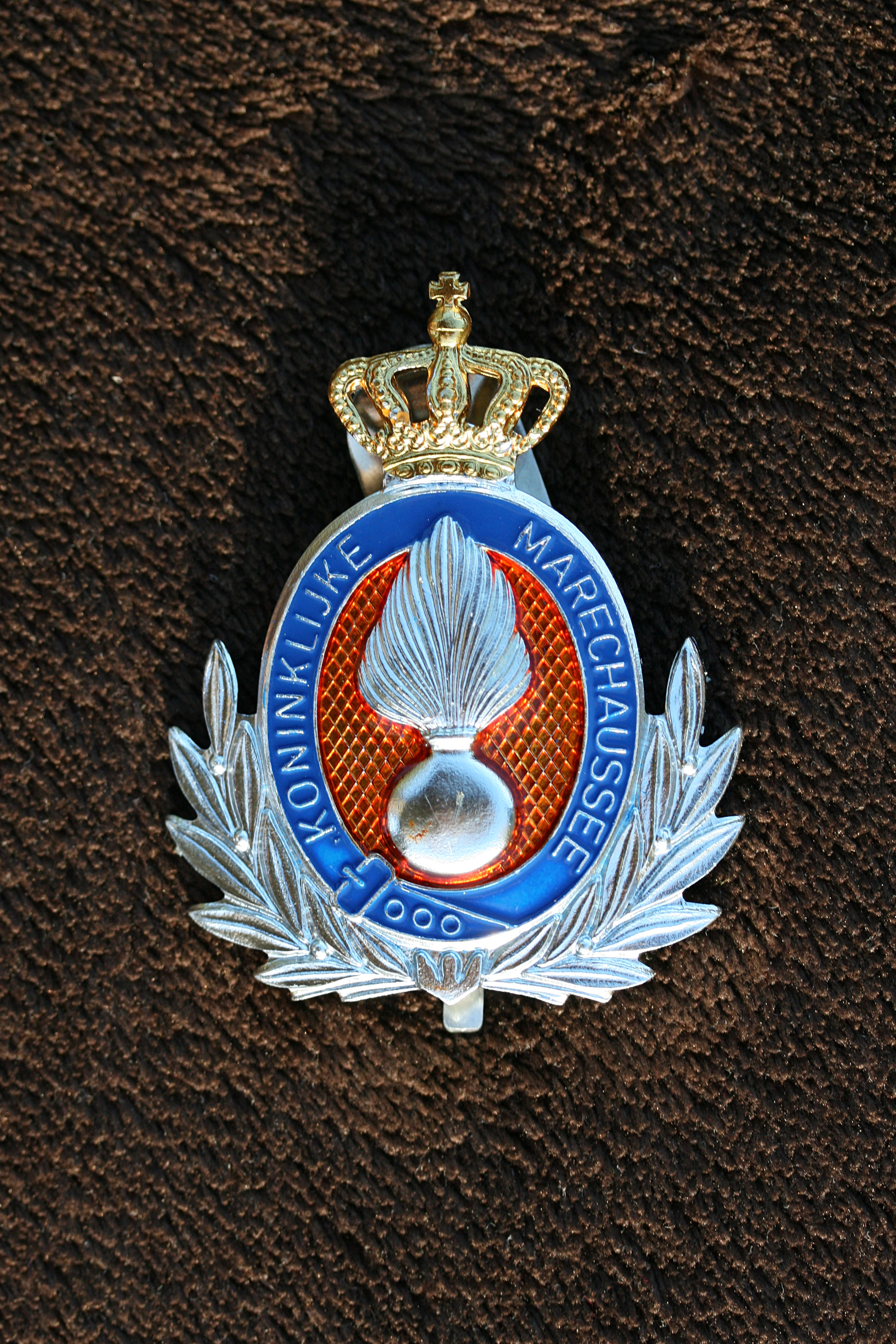
Beret badge

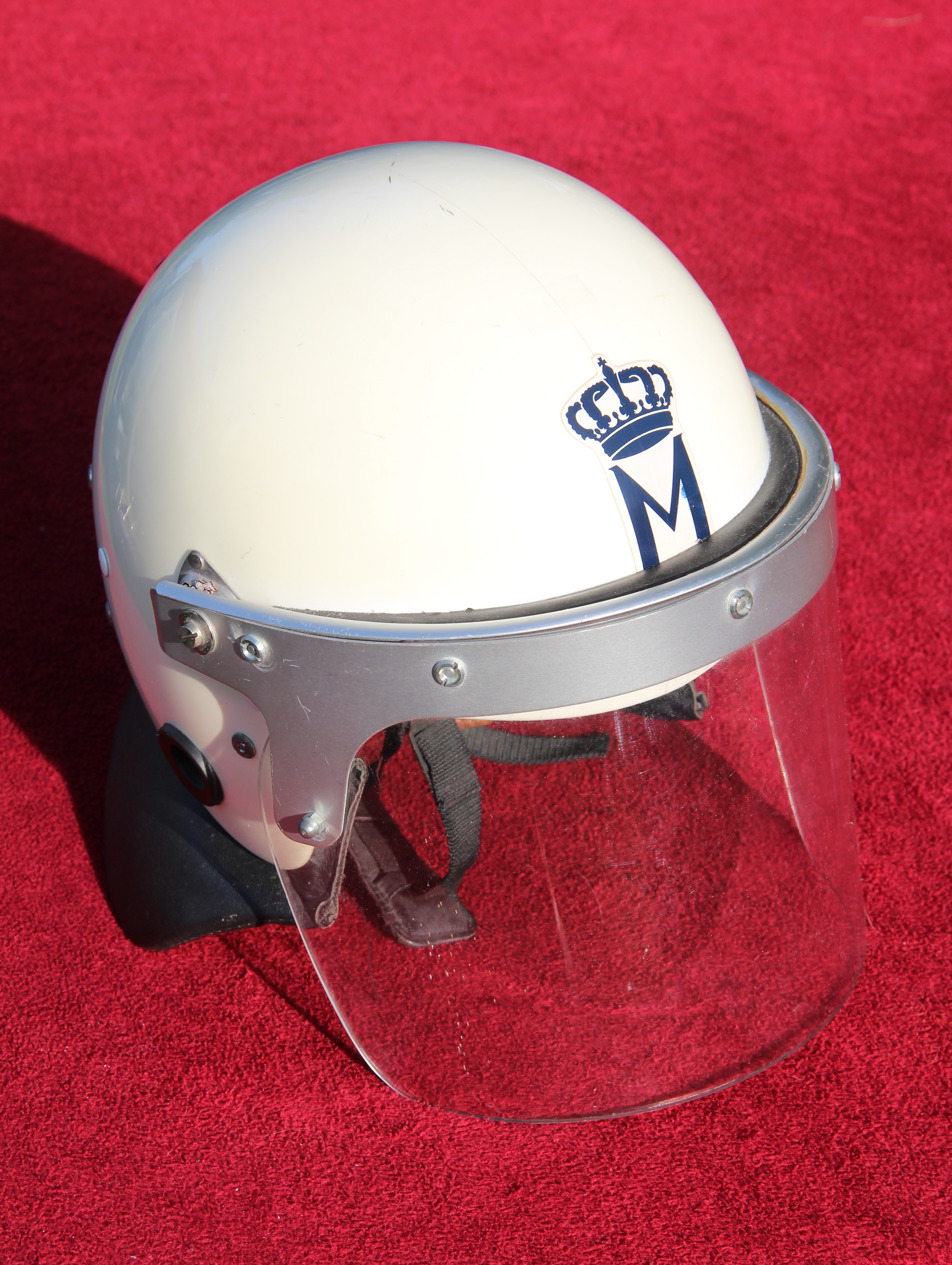
Old style helmet worn by Marechaussees on riot duty

== See also ==
- Marechaussee Museum
- Constabulary
- Dutch police
- Gendarmerie
