= SKD =

SKD may refer to:

- IATA airport code for Samarkand Airport, Uzbekistan
- Semi-knocked-down kit of parts
- Science Ki Duniya, a magazine
- Slovenski krščanski demokrati (Slovene Christian Democrats), Slovene political party
- Shaun Kenny-Dowall, rugby league footballer
- Simon Kirwan Donaldson, English mathematician
- Stichting Koninklijke Defensiemusea, a collection of four main military museums in the Netherlands
