= Netherlands Marine Corps Museum =

Museum in Rotterdam, the Netherlands

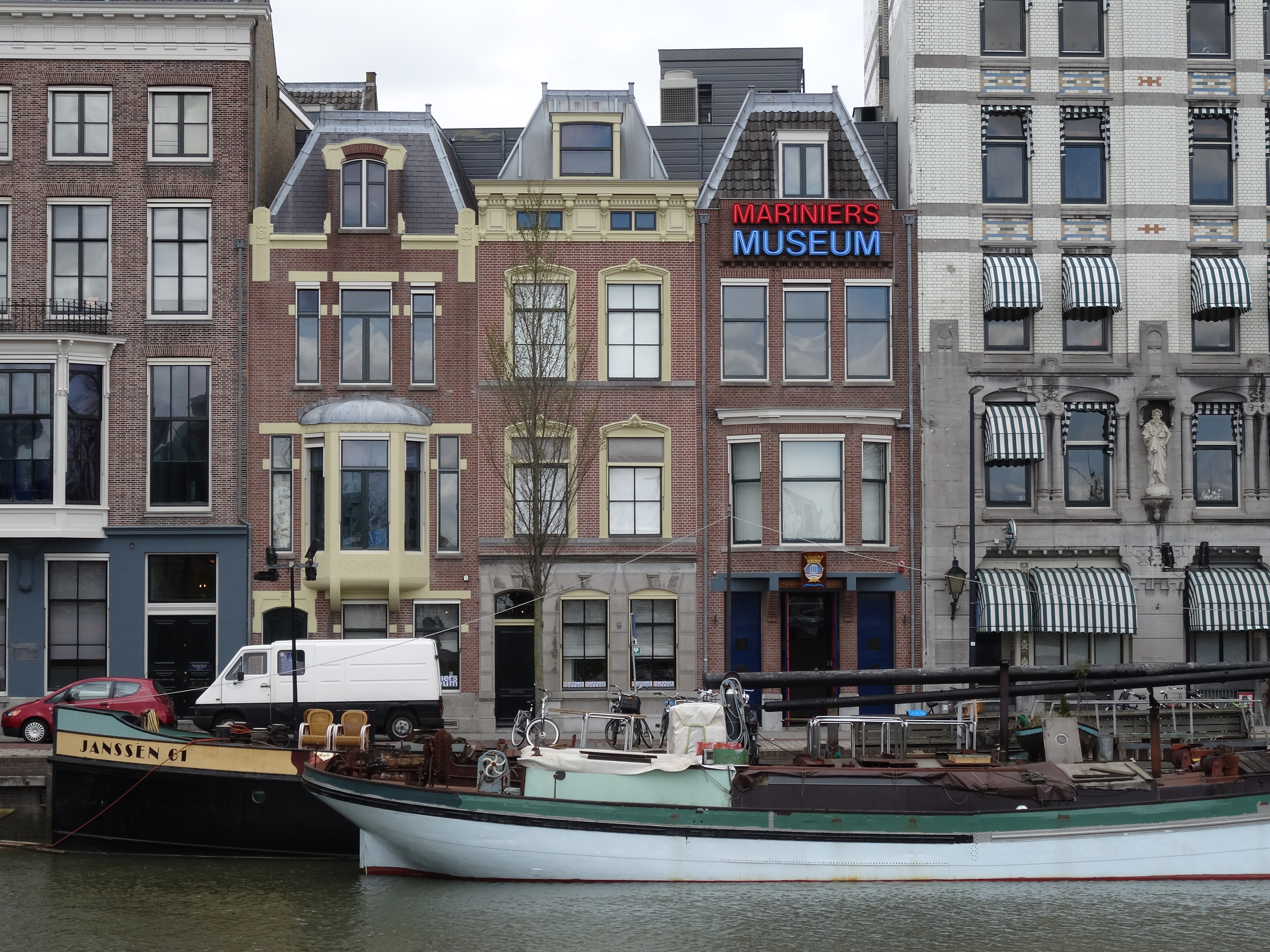
The Museum in Rotterdam

Netherlands Marine Corps Museum (Dutch - Mariniersmuseum) is a museum on the history of the Netherlands Marine Corps. Since December 1995 it has been housed in a building on the Wijnhaven in Rotterdam. Since 2014 it has been one of the four museums managed by the Koninklijke Stichting Defensiemusea (KSD).
