= Annals of Clinical Biochemistry =

- Discipline: Clinical biochemistry
- Language: English
- Edited by: Michael J Murphy

Publication details
- History: 1960-present
- Publisher: SAGE Publications on behalf of The Association for Clinical Biochemistry and Laboratory Medicine (United Kingdom)
- Frequency: Bimonthly
- Impact factor: 1.893 (2018)

Standard abbreviations
- ISO 4: Ann. Clin. Biochem.

Indexing
- ISSN: 0004-5632 (print); 1758-1001 (web)
- OCLC no.: 848282046

Links
- Journal website; Online access; Online archive

Annals of Clinical Biochemistry is a bimonthly peer-reviewed scientific journal covering all aspects of clinical biochemistry. The editor-in-chief is Michael J Murphy (University of Dundee). It was established 1960 and is published by SAGE Publications on behalf of The Association for Clinical Biochemistry and Laboratory Medicine.

== Abstracting and indexing ==
The journal is abstracted and indexed in:

- Scopus
- Science Citation Index Expanded
- Academic Search Premier
- AIDS and Cancer Research Abstracts
- Analytical Abstracts
- Elsevier BIOBASE
- Biochemistry & Biophysics Citation Index
- Biotechnology & Bioengineering Abstracts
- Biotechnology Research Abstracts
- CINAHL Plus with Full Text
- Neurosciences Abstracts
- Current Contents/Life Sciences
- EMBASE
- Immunology Abstracts
- PubMed/MEDLINE
- ProQuest databases

According to the Journal Citation Reports, its 2012 impact factor is 1.922, ranking it 12th out of 31 journals in the category "Medical Laboratory Technology".
