= Nationaal Militair Museum =

Coordinates: 52.1316°N 5.2760°E

Nationaal Militair Museum (NMM)
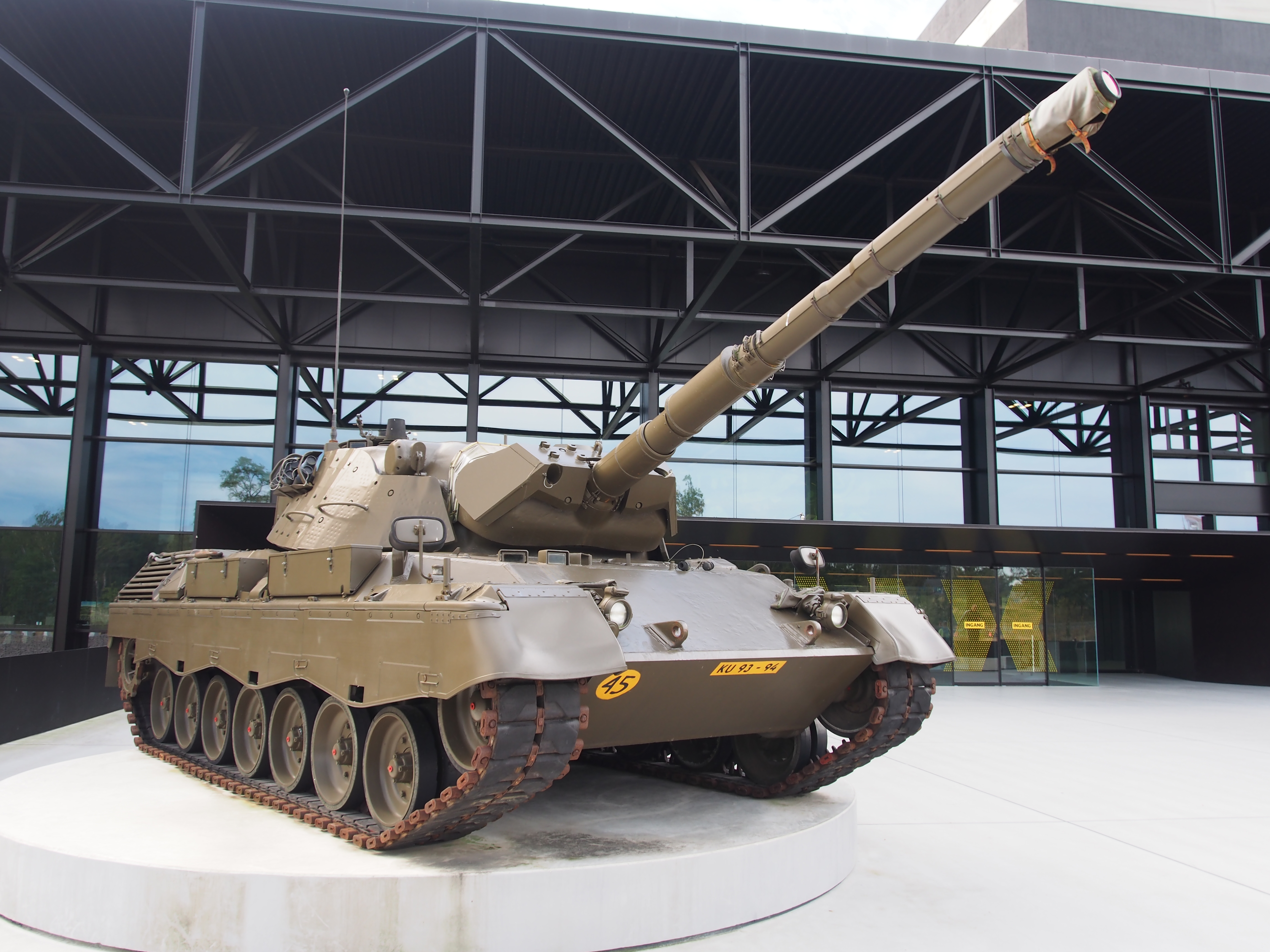
- A Leopard 1V as a guard for the entrance
- Established: December 11, 2014; 11 years ago
- Location: Soesterberg, Netherlands
- Type: Military museum
- Collections: Dutch Armed Forces
- Director: Marita Schreur
- Curator: Louis Ph. Sloos (conservator collection); Alfred Staarman (conservator airplanes); Dirk Staat (conservator public history); Mathieu Willemsen (conservator firearms)
- Website: https://www.nmm.nl/

The Nationaal Militair Museum (NMM) is a military museum in Soesterberg, Netherlands. It focuses on the history of the Dutch Armed Forces with emphasis on the Royal Netherlands Army and the Royal Netherlands Air Force. The Stichting Koninklijke Defensiemusea (Royal Defense Museums Foundation) oversees the museum.

Its collection derives from the Legermuseum in Delft and the Militaire Luchtvaart Museum in Soesterberg, which were merged to form the NMM in 2014.

The museum occupies the site of the former Soesterberg Air Base.

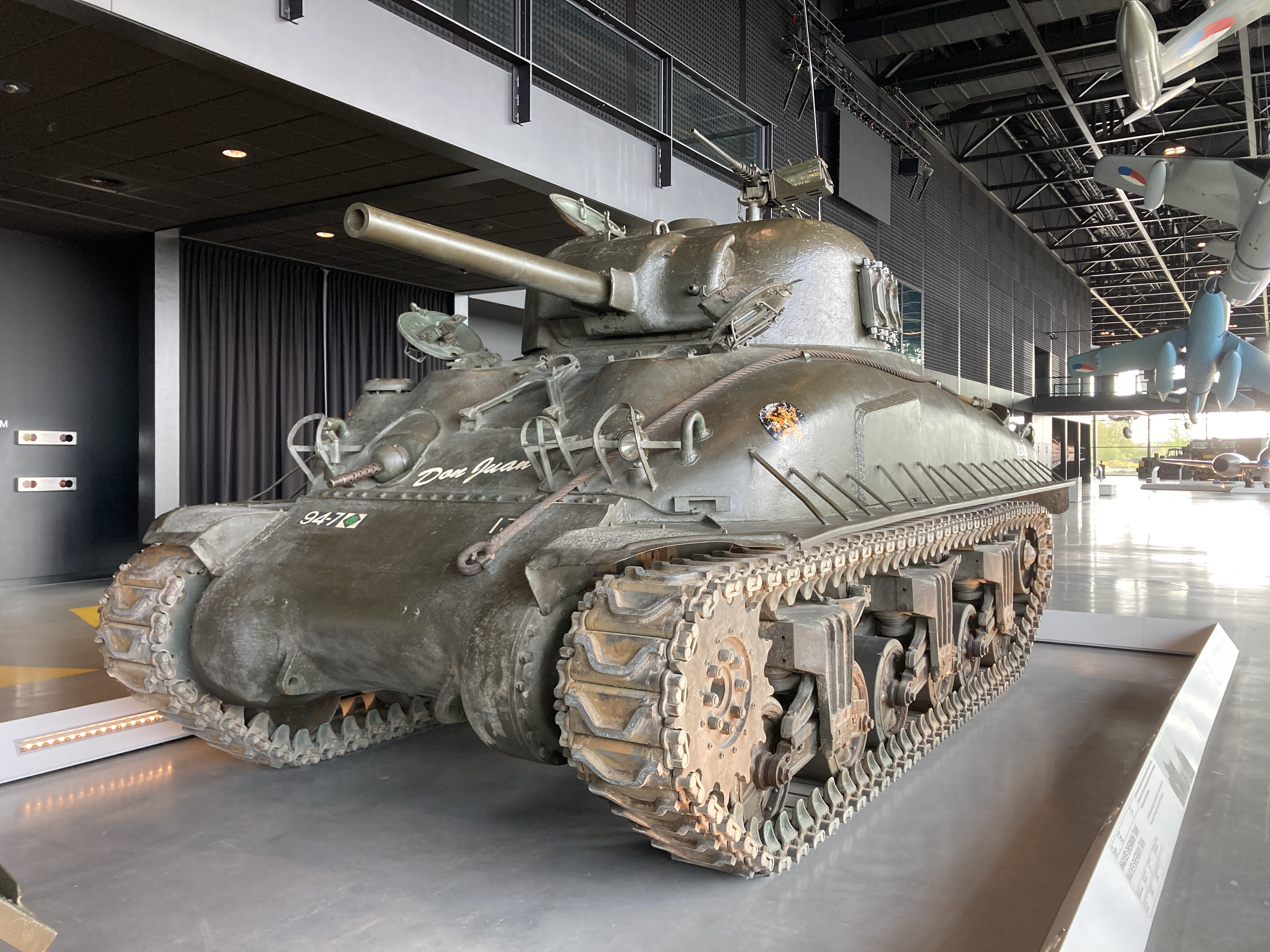
Sherman Tank located in the Nationaal Militair Museum

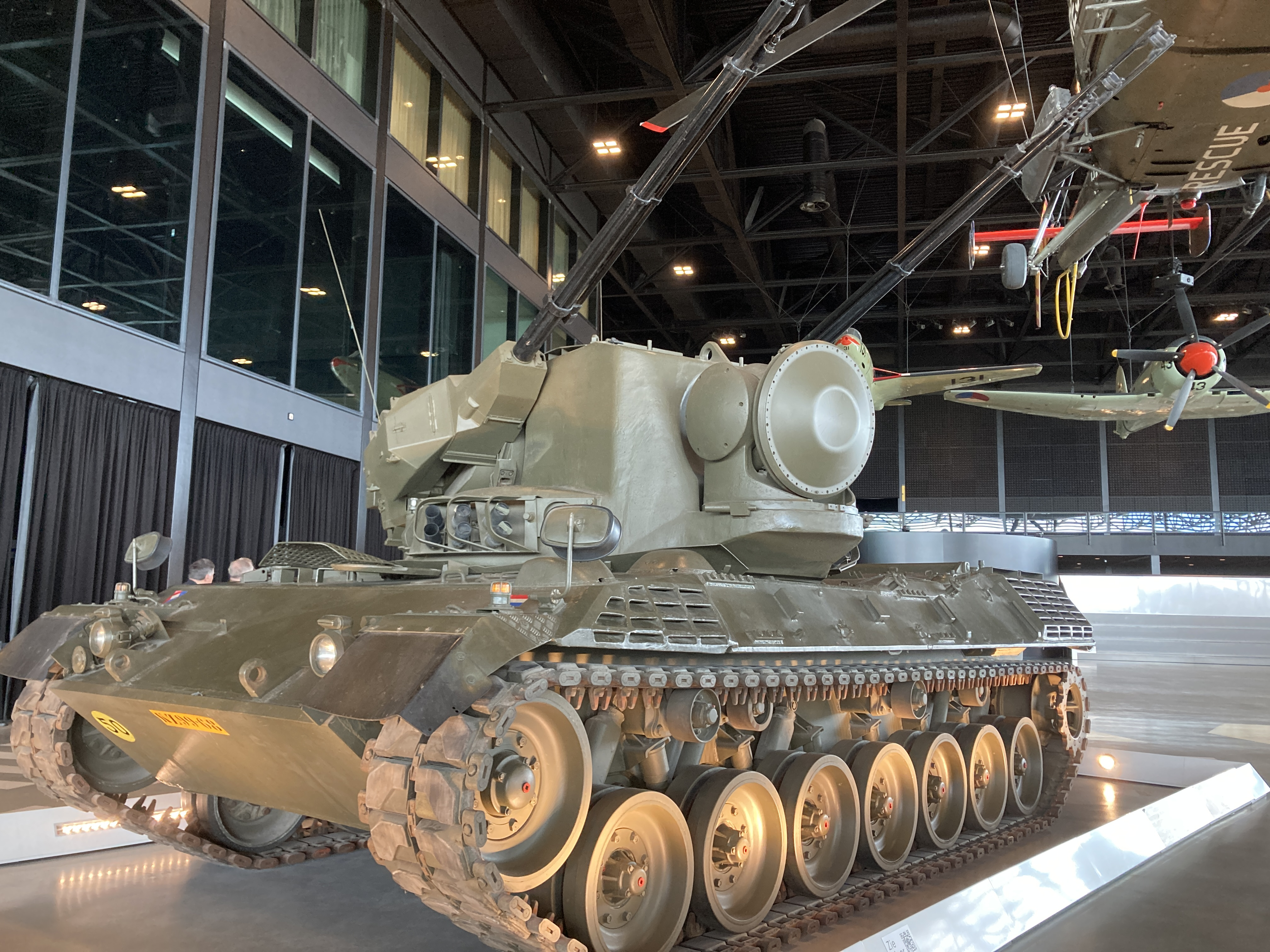
Flugabwehrkanonenpanzer Gepard at Nationaal Militair Museum

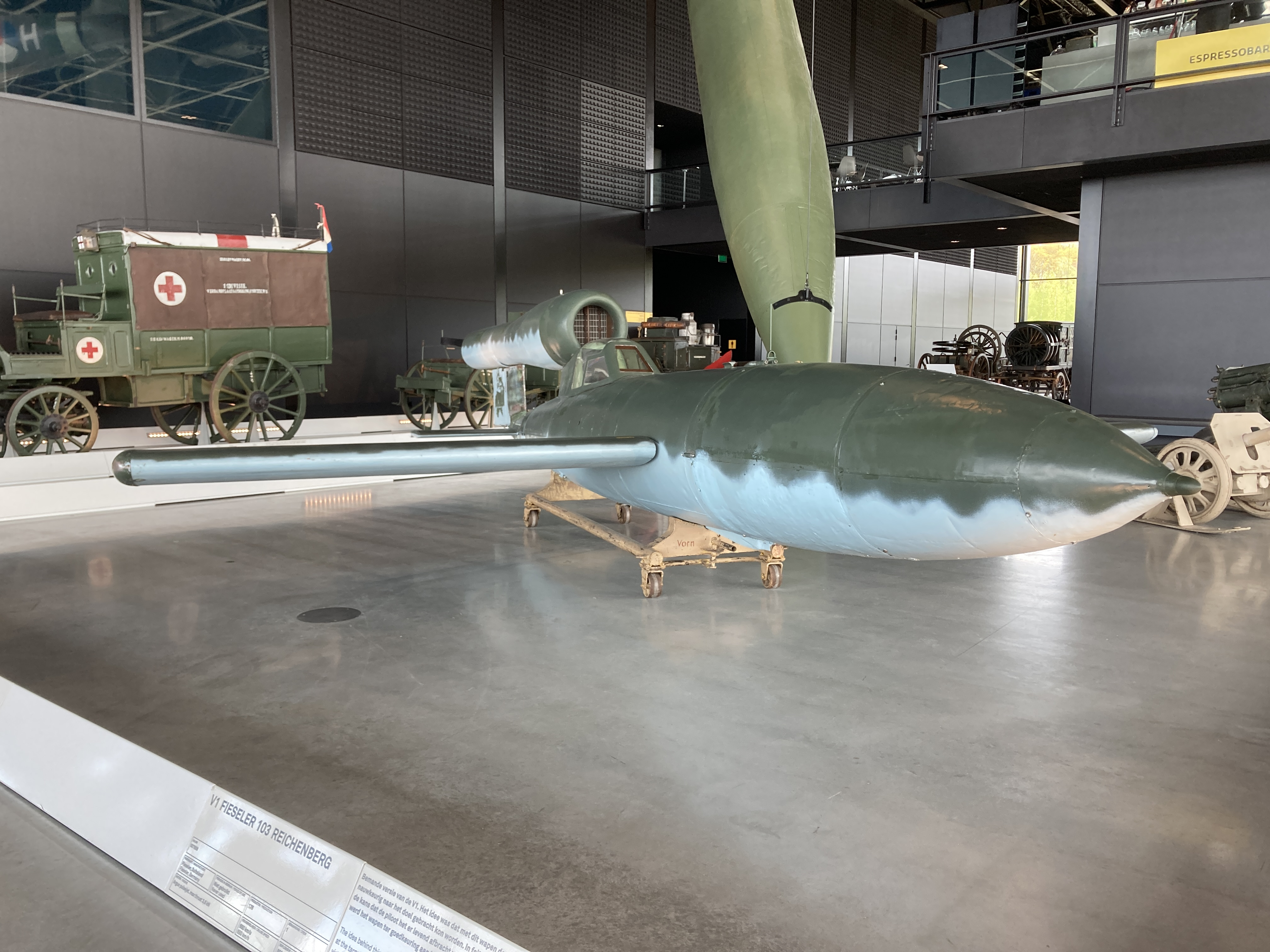
Fieseler Fi103 „Reichenberg-Gerät“

== See also ==
- Bundeswehr Museum of German Defense Technology – Koblenz, Germany
- Deutsches Panzermuseum – Munster, Germany
- Australian Armour and Artillery Museum – Australia
- Musée des Blindés – Saumur, France
- Royal Tank Museum – Amman, Jordan
- The Tank Museum – Bovington, United Kingdom
- Ontario Regiment Museum – Oshawa, Canada
- United States Army Ordnance Museum
- Polish Army Museum – Warsaw, Poland
