= Gilze-Rijen Air Base =

Military airport in North Brabant, Netherlands

Gilze-Rijen Air Base
- Vliegbasis Gilze-Rijen
- Gilze en Rijen, North Brabant in Netherlands
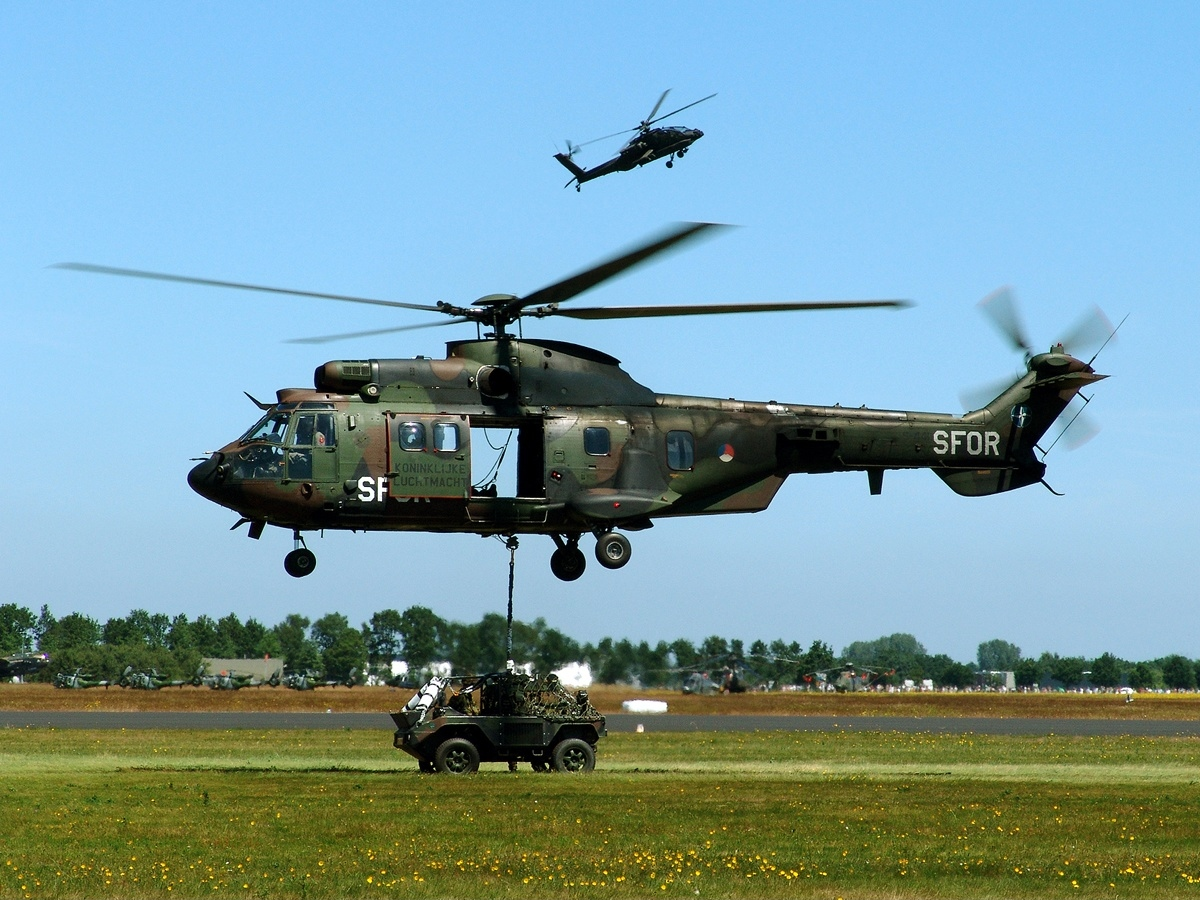
- An AS532U2 Cougar Mk2 and AH-64D Apache (in background) of the Royal Netherlands Air Force at Gilze-Rijen Air Base

Site information
- Type: Military airfield
- Owner: Ministry of Defence
- Operator: Royal Netherlands Air and Space Force (RNLASF)
- Condition: Operational
- Website: Official website (Dutch)

Location
- Location in the Netherlands
- Coordinates: 51°34′02″N 004°55′54″E

Site history
- Built: 1910
- In use: 1910–present

Airfield information
- Identifiers: IATA: GLZ, ICAO: EHGR, WMO: 063500
- Elevation: 14.9 metres (49 ft) AMSL
Runways
Direction	Length and surface
10/28	2,767.5 metres (9,080 ft) Asphalt
02/20	1,995.8 metres (6,548 ft) Asphalt
- Source: Military Aeronautical Information Publication Netherlands

Gilze-Rijen Air Base (Dutch: Vliegbasis Gilze-Rijen, IATA: GLZ, ICAO: EHGR) is a military airbase in the south of Netherlands. It is known for having the hottest temperature ever measured in the Netherlands, with a temperature of 40.7 °C, on July 25, 2019. It is between the cities of Breda and Tilburg, which are both in North Brabant. The airport is mainly, but not exclusively, used as a base for Royal Netherlands Air and Space Force helicopters. The airfield has two runways, the longest one is complete with an instrument landing system (ILS) and is 2,779 metres (9,117 ft) long by 45 m (148 ft) wide in the 10/28 direction. The shorter runway (without ILS) is 1,996 m (6,549 ft) by 30 m (98 ft) in the 02/20 direction.

== History ==
Gilze-Rijen Air Base is the oldest airfield in the Netherlands, the first aircraft to have landed there being a Blériot in 1910. The first military aircraft activity dates back to 1913, when a Farman aircraft used the field for military exercises which established it as a military airfield.

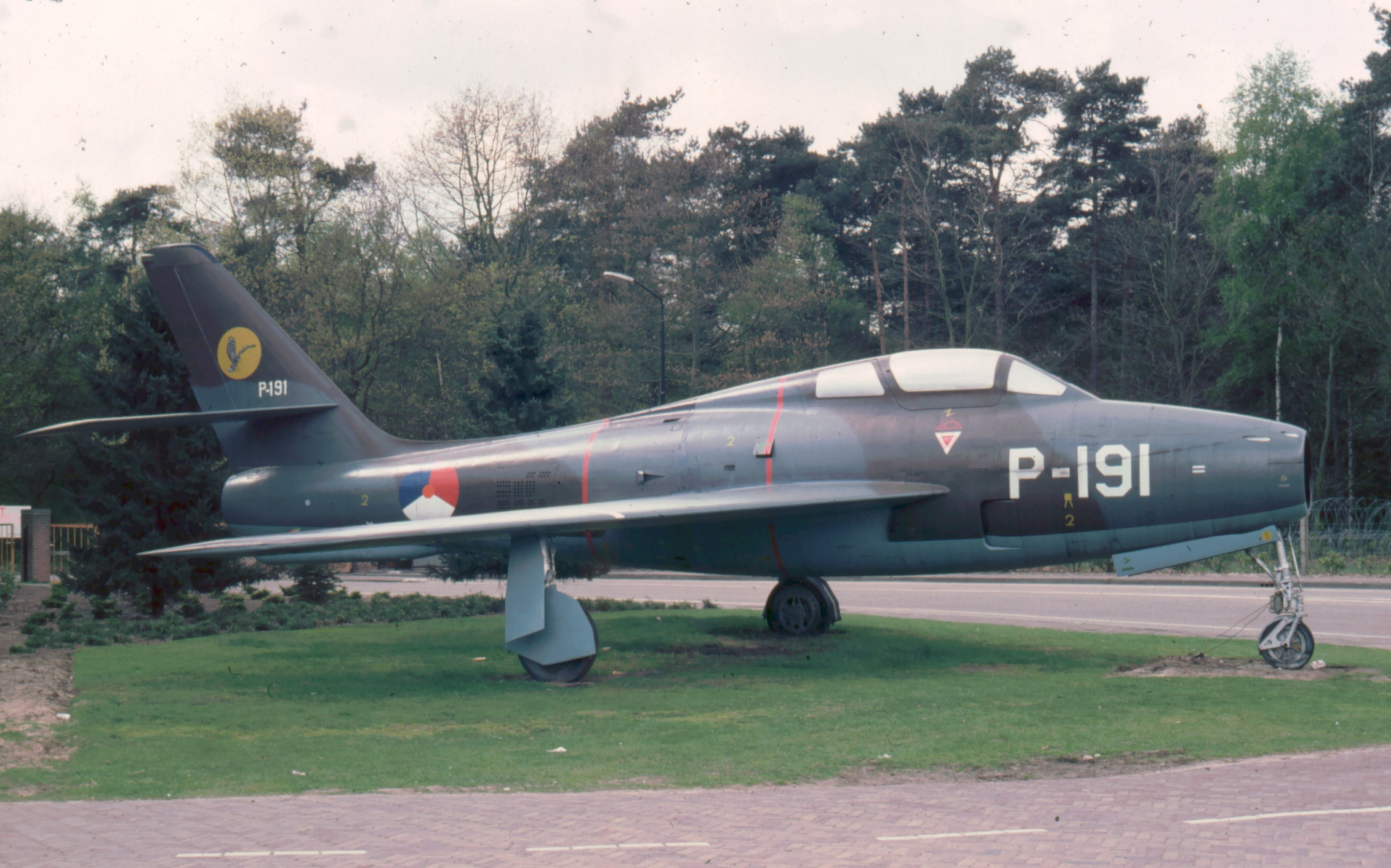
Republic F-84F Thunderstreak as a gateguard at Gilze-Rijen Air Base

In 1940, the airfield came under heavy attack from the German Luftwaffe, who later took control of the base and expanded it for their own use. While in German hands during the Second World War, the field came under frequent attack from allied forces until the liberation of the south of the Netherlands, after which the Royal Air Force took control of the airfield.

In 1946, the Royal Netherlands Air Force (RNLAF) resumed operations from the airfield, using it as a training base for pilots and air traffic controllers. In 1962, training activity was suspended, and Gilze-Rijen was reduced to a reserve base for bomber aircraft. Training activity was resumed in 1967, mainly using Fokker S-11s and Piper Cubs. For paratrooper training and group droppings the Fokker F27 Friendship was in use. In 1971, the training activity was suspended again when a fighter squadron was moved to the airfield, which also included a significant upgrade of airport facilities. Initially the Northrop NF-5A/B, and later its replacement, the General Dynamics F-16A/B Fighting Falcon, were operated from the base up until 1995. It has 30 Hardened Aircraft Shelters (HAS).

In 1995, as a part of a large-scale reorganisation within the Royal Netherlands Air Force, the fighter aircraft were moved from Gilze-Rijen, and the base became the home of Bölkow Bo-105 helicopters instead. In 1998, AH-64 Apache attack helicopters followed, while the Bo-105 helicopters were slowly being phased out.

In 2009, helicopter operations from Soesterberg Air Base were moved to Gilze-Rijen Air Base, which resulted in CH-47 Chinook and AS 532U2 Cougar Mk 2 helicopters being based at the airfield as well as the Alouette III for VIP transport, making Gilze-Rijen the main operating base for military helicopters in the Netherlands.

== Stichting Koninklijke Luchtmacht Historische Vlucht ==
The Stichting Koninklijke Luchtmacht Historische Vlucht (Royal Air Force Historic Flight Foundation) is also located at Gilze-Rijen air base, owning and operating a collection of mainly historic military aircraft. The current fleet consists of the following aircraft:

- Auster Mk.III
- Beech T-7 Navigator
- Cessna 172P Skyhawk (for training purposes)
- de Havilland 82A Tiger Moth
- de Havilland Canada DHC-2 Beaver
- Fokker S-11 (4x)
- Noorduyn Harvard IIb (6x)
- North American B-25 Mitchell
- Piper Cub (6x)
- Ryan ST-M
- Stinson L-5 Sentinel
- Supermarine Spitfire Mk.IX

== Based units ==
Units based at Gilze-Rijen Air Base.

== Glider Flying ==
Outside opening hours, glider flying takes place both by winch launching and aerotows. Gilzer Luchtvaartclub Illustrious (founded 1945) has a fleet of 4 twin-seated gliders and 3 single seaters, as well as a Diamond Super Dimona for aerotows.

=== Royal Netherlands Air and Space Force ===
Defence Helicopter Command

- No. 298 Squadron – CH-47F Chinook
- No. 299 Squadron – Helicopter training and standards
- No. 300 Squadron – AS532U2 Cougar Mk 2
- No. 301 Squadron – AH-64E Apache
- No. 930 Squadron – Maintenance and Logistics
- No. 931 Squadron – Base operations and Force Protection

Centre for Man in Aviation

- SERE School – Survival, Evasion, Resistance and Escape training facility
- OGZ – Operational Healthcare

== See also ==
- The Netherlands in World War II
