= Soesterberg Air Base =

Defunct Air Base in Soesterberg, Netherlands

Soesterberg Air Base Camp New Amsterdam
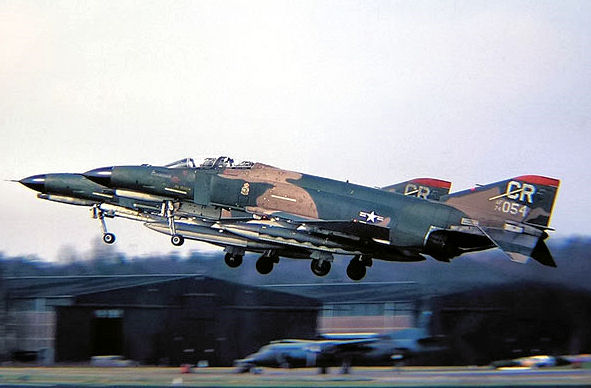
- F-4E Phantom II of 32nd TFS taking off, around 1975, at Soesterberg Air Base
- IATA: UTC; ICAO: EHSB

Summary
- Airport type: Military
- Owner: Military of the Netherlands
- Operator: Royal Netherlands Air Force (RNLAF)
- Location: Soesterberg, Netherlands
- Elevation AMSL: 20 m (66 ft)
- Coordinates: 52°8′3″N 5°16′59″E
- Interactive map of Soesterberg Air Base; Camp New Amsterdam

Runways
Direction	Length		Surface
Direction	m	ft	Surface
09/27	3,075	10,089	Asphalt
- Source: DAFIF

Soesterberg Air Base (IATA: UTC, ICAO: EHSB) was a Royal Netherlands Air Force (RNLAF) military air base located in Soesterberg, 14 kilometres (8.7 mi) east-northeast of Utrecht. It was first established as an airfield in 1911, and in 1913, the Dutch Army bought the field and established the Army Aviation Division.

For almost 40 years, United States Air Force facilities at Soesterberg, named Camp New Amsterdam, were a major front line USAFE air base during the Cold War. The base was closed on 31 December 2008, due to budget cuts in the Dutch armed forces. The air base ceased flying operations on 12 November 2008, when the command was transferred from the RNLAF to the Ministry of Defence which will maintain the base until it will be given back to nature. The last fighter ever to depart, delayed due bad weather at Aviano AB, was a Greek F-4E Phantom II. The former USAFE facilities remained in military hands, and will now officially be called Camp New Amsterdam.

== Early history ==
During World War I, the Netherlands was a neutral country, and flew border patrol missions from Soesterberg airfield. The Dutch confiscated all foreign aircraft landing inside the borders of their country during the war, and added the operational ones to their inventory to be used for pilot training at Soesterberg.

At the beginning of World War II, the Dutch again declared neutrality, but German forces invaded in May 1940 and overran the country in five days, Soesterberg was occupied by the German Luftwaffe on 15 May 1940. A variety of German aircraft were stationed there during the war, flying anti-ship missions along British convoy routes in the North Sea, bombing missions over England, and fighter defence against Allied bombing missions. Throughout the war, allied air forces caused enormous damage to the airfield, and by September 1944 the Luftwaffe acknowledged Soesterberg airfield to be more or less useless.

In May 1945, Canadian forces liberated the airfield. After the war, an extensive Dutch construction program was started to build new hangars and extend the runways. Several locations around the base, used as service areas during the war, were upgraded. On 5 August 1951, the Royal Netherlands Air Force (RNLAF) declared it operational and gave it an air defence role. The RNLAF has maintained flying units at Soesterberg since then.

Two monuments were erected on the base; the Monument for Fallen Aviators (Monument voor Gevallen Vliegers) is the official RNLAF memorial, and located near the main entrance of the base. On Remembrance of the Dead, May 4, the RNLAF holds a ceremony to remember and commemorate the fallen of World War II.

The other monument at the base is for executed resistance fighters. It is the symbol for the sacrifice that 33 resistance fighters gave for freedom. Every year on 19 November, there is a memorial service. During World War II, the German Army (Wehrmacht) secretly executed the 33 resistance fighters in the woods of the base. The resistance fighters were part of several resistance groups and most of them were caught due to betrayal. Although the execution was held in secret, there were rumors about it, and after the war the base was minutely searched. The mass grave, camouflaged by buried trees, was located by Major A. Siedenburg. His son was one of the victims.

== United States use ==
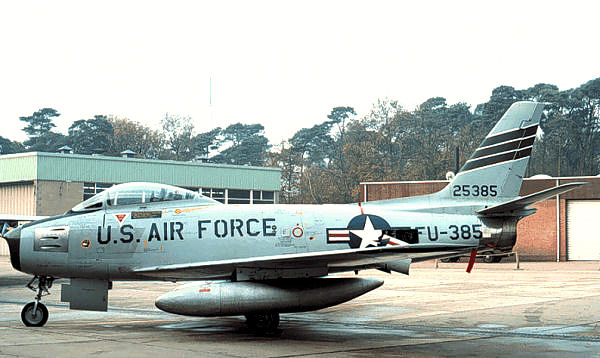
North American F-86F-25-NH Sabre, AF Ser. No. 52-5385. This aircraft is now on display at the Nationaal Militair Museum on the former Soesterberg Air Base, Netherlands.

In 1954, the Dutch government agreed to the stationing of a US Air Force fighter squadron to augment air defence. The USAF forces operated from a part of Soesterberg Air Base which was named Camp New Amsterdam, in honour of the first Dutch settlement in America, Nieuw Amsterdam, later renamed New York City.

=== 512th Fighter-Day Squadron ===
The first U.S. Air Forces in Europe (USAFE) unit to operate from Soesterberg was the 512th Fighter-Day Squadron, which arrived with North American F-86F "Sabre" on 16 November 1954 from RAF Manston in the UK. By July 1955, the 512th reached full operational status.

=== 32d Fighter-Interceptor Squadron ===
In September 1955, the designation of the 512th was transferred to RAF Shepherds Grove, where it replaced the 78th FIS. Its aircraft, personnel, and equipment stayed in the Netherlands and made up the newly activated 32d Fighter Day Squadron, which was operated at Soesterberg as a detachment of the 36th Fighter Wing at Bitburg Air Base in West Germany.

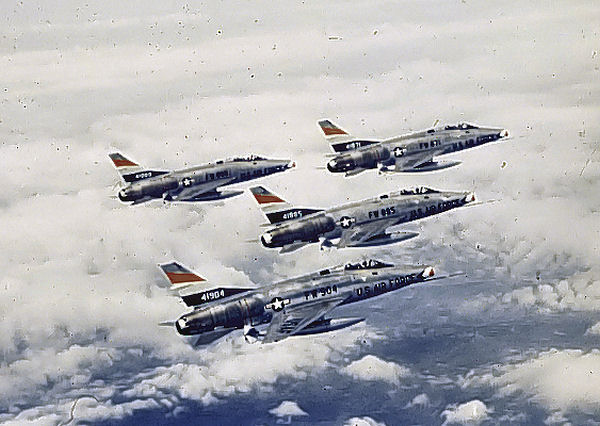
North American F-100C-20-NA Super Sabres of the 32d Tactical Fighter Squadron. Identifiable AF Serial Numbers are 54–1904, 54-1905 and 53-1771

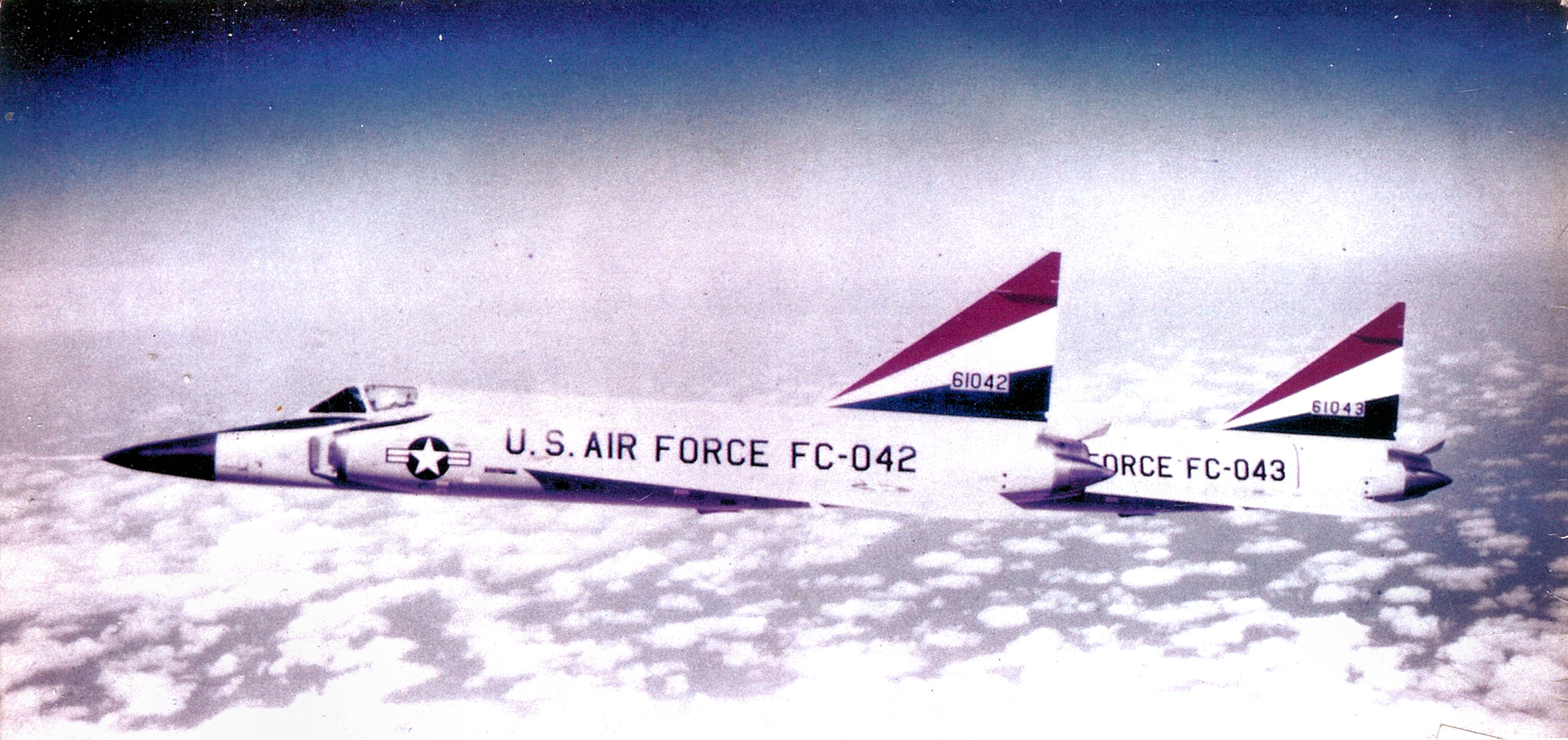
Convair F-102A-55-CO Delta Daggers of the 32d Fighter-Interceptor Squadron, AF Serial Numbers 56-1042 and 56–1043. In the 1980s, these aircraft were later modified to the PQM-102B configuration and used as target drones.

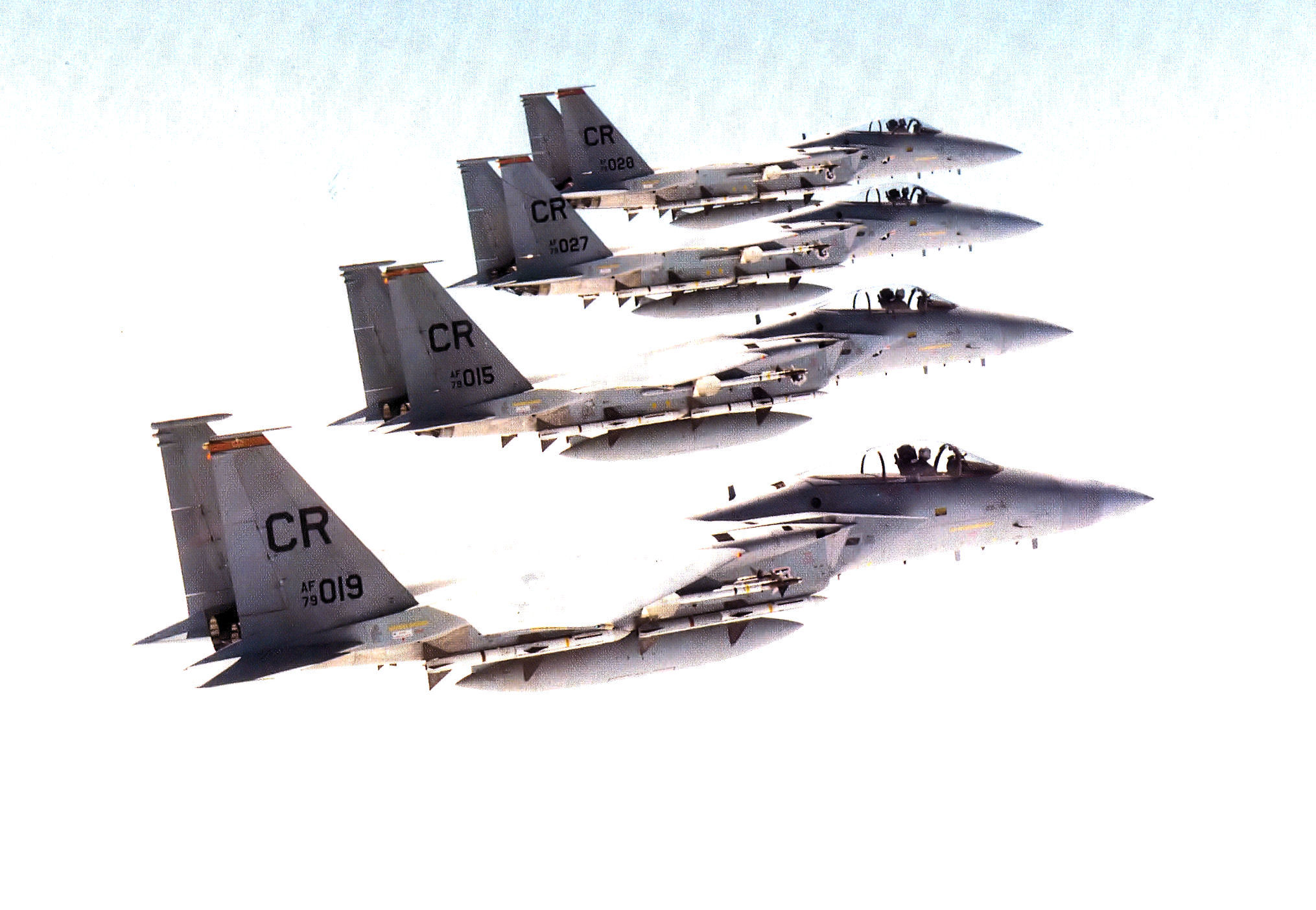
McDonnell Douglas F-15C-24-MC Eagles of the 32d Tactical Fighter Group, AF Serial Numbers 79–0015, 0019, 0026 and 0027. When the 32d TFG was inactivated in 1994, these aircraft were sold to the Royal Saudi Air Force.

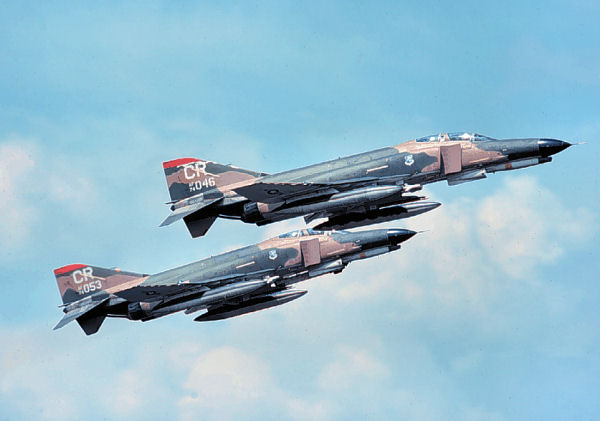
McDonnell Douglas F-4E-61-MC Phantoms of the 32d Tactical Fighter Squadron, AF Serial Numbers 74-1046 and 74–1053. These aircraft served until the late 1980s in USAFE, TAC and AFRES before being retired to AMARC.

In 1956, the squadron transitioned to the North American F-100 Super Sabre. The 32d sent five instructors pilots to Sidi Slimane AB in Morocco to complete transition training for the F-100. At the same time, the squadron began ferrying the F-86s to Prestwick, Scotland, and Châteauroux-Déols Air Base in France for disposal. On 18 July 1958, USAFE redesignated the unit as the 32d Tactical Fighter Squadron, as part of the 36th Tactical Fighter Wing.

Due to the requirement of a longer runway for landing and take-off, the runway of the base was extended to over 3,000 metres (9,840 ft).

In 1959, the 32d received the signature "Royal", the crown and wreath of the Dutch royal family (the House of Orange-Nassau) were added to the emblem, giving it its unique look. This unique honour was granted in recognition of the unit's contribution to the defence of the Netherlands, and graphically illustrates the 32d's close ties with the Royal Netherlands Air Force. The 32d TFS had the unique distinction of being the only unit in the USAF whose emblem included the royal crest of another nation. This addition was only authorised as long as the 32d TFS remained in the Netherlands.

From 1959, the 32d was redesignated as the 32d Fighter Interceptor Squadron and received Convair F-102 Delta Daggers. It acquired a 24-hour alert interceptor mission from Soesterberg as part of NATO’s Second Allied Tactical Air Force. The 32 FIS was assigned to the USAFE 86th Air Division (Defense) at Ramstein Air Base West Germany on 1 July 1960. This transfer was made in order that all USAF fighter assets in Europe could be concentrated in one command.

=== 32nd Tactical Fighter Squadron ===
As a result of the 1968 Soviet intervention in Czechoslovakia, the USAF announced that its F-102 squadrons would be re-equipped with the modern McDonnell Douglas F-4 Phantom II. The 32nd FIS was first in line to undergo the conversion, and the F-102s were flown back to the United States and were transferred to the Air National Guard.

On 1 July 1969, the USAF redesignated the unit as the 32nd Tactical Fighter Squadron (32nd TFS). On 6 August 1969, the first two, brand new, Phantoms arrived. Flying the F-4 Phantom meant some drastic changes for the squadron and the base.

In 1989, the Dutch government allowed the USAF to change its headquarters unit at Soesterberg AB from squadron to group status. The 32d Tactical Fighter Group was activated at Soesterberg on 16 November 1989, with the 32nd Tactical Fighter Squadron as a subordinate unit with the exact same number of F-15s. Group aircrew and ground support personnel were deployed, for operations Desert Shield and Desert Storm to Incirlik Air Base, Turkey. On 28 January 1991, an F-15C destroyed an Iraqi MiG-23 Flogger fighter aircraft. After the war they continued their air activities in theatre as a part of Operation Provide Comfort from April 1991 until April 1993.

== Dutch use ==
On the Dutch side, the airfield was also used by various fighter units. The last Dutch fighter unit stationed at the airfield was 325 Squadron flying the Hawker Hunter, which was inactivated in August 1968. In September 1968 three flying units came to Soesterberg from Ypenburg Air Base. These were 334 Squadron flying the Fokker F27, 298 Squadron flying the Alouette III and the SAR flight also flying the Alouette III. The SAR flight transferred to Leeuwarden Air Base in 1977.

In August 1981, 336 Squadron was re-instituted at Soesterberg with the mission of patrolling the skies over and around the islands of the Netherlands Antilles in the Caribbean. For the job, two new Fokker F27 200-MAR maritime patrol aircraft were ordered. In September 1981, the first aircraft was delivered to the Royal Netherlands Air Force, and received the registration M-1. This aircraft departed to Curaçao in early November 1981, the aircraft arrived on Hato Air Base on 13 November 1981. The second F27, registered M-2, arrived in March 1982.

In 1992, 334 Squadron moved to Eindhoven Airport. With this departure, 298 Squadron was the only Dutch flying unit at the base until 1995, when 300 Squadron joined 298 Squadron. In the same year, the 298 Squadron converted to the CH-47 Chinook, and passed the Alouette III to Gilze-Rijen Air Base, while 300 Squadron received the AS 532 U2 Cougar. Later the Alouette III returned to Soesterberg and joined 300 Squadron.

== USAF departure ==
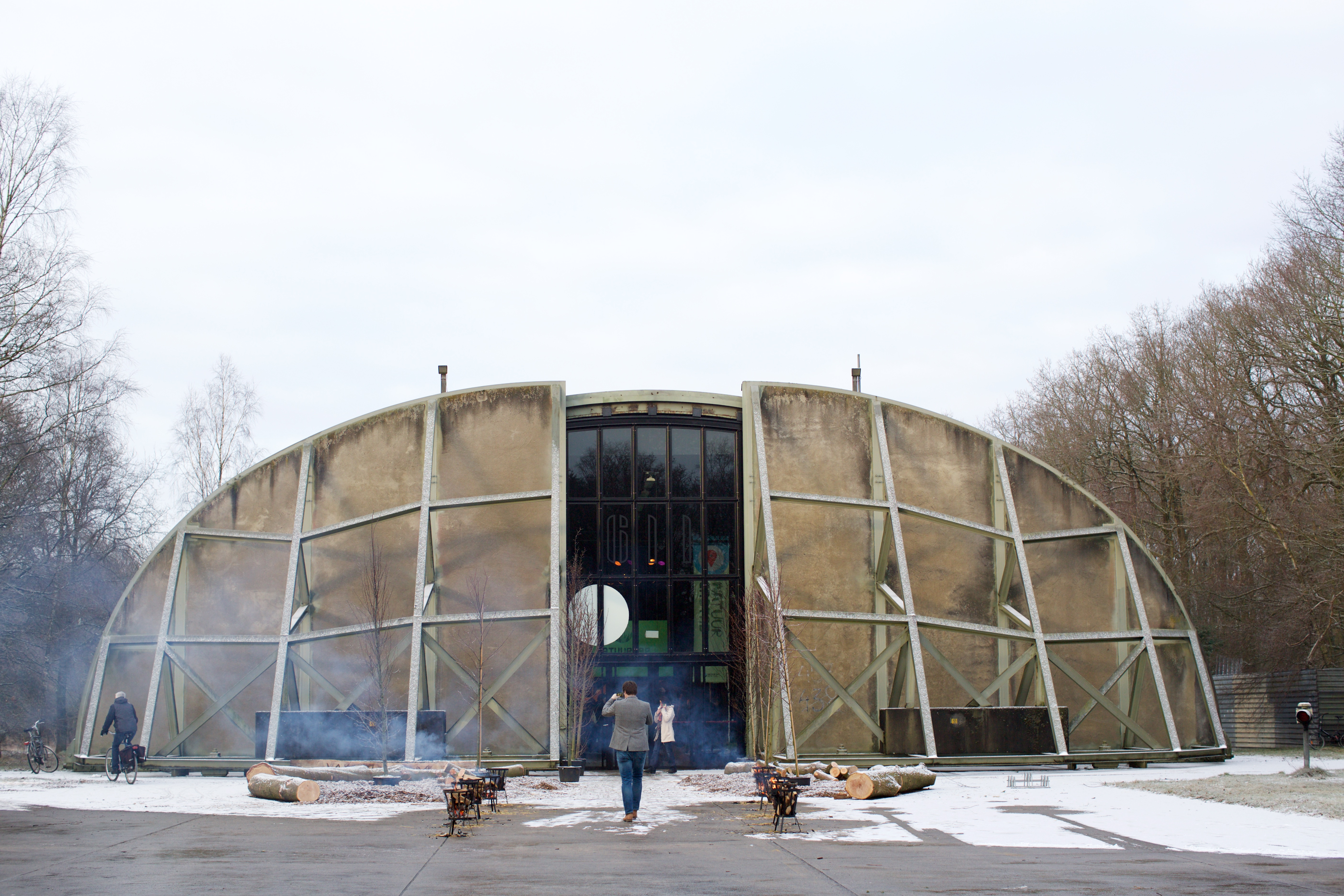
A former hangar of the air base used as a conference space, 2015

With the end of the Cold War, a major force draw-down occurred in Europe, with the USAF reducing its USAFE fighter force structure. These changes affected the 32nd and, as part of the draw-down, the squadron's F-15 Eagles returned to the United States. The original intent of USAFE was to inactivate the 32d Fighter Group and orders were so issued inactivating the group's subordinate units on 1 July 1994 and the group on 1 October.

On 19 April, the group furled its colors in formal ceremonies attended by members of the royal family, and the American ambassador. On 1 July, HQ USAFE activated the 632d Air Base Squadron to replace the 32d Fighter Group at Soesterberg to complete closure actions. The same order redesignated the group's 32d Fighter Squadron as the 32d Air Operations Squadron, part of the 32d Air Operations Group. All actions were effective 1 July 1994.

In this way, USAFE was able to preserve the lineage of these two distinguished units. The U.S. part of Soesterberg was returned to the Netherlands government on 27 September 1994. Only one USAF F-15A remains in the Netherlands, and is displayed at the Military Aviation Museum. Soesterberg then became a Royal Netherlands Air Force transport helicopter base with 298th squadron (CH-47 Chinook) and 300th squadron (AS 532 U2 Cougar and SA 316) stationed at the base.

Flying officially ended on 12 November 2008. The last jet ever to take off was a Hellenic AF F-4E Phantom II. The base formally closed on 31 December 2008, with the 298th and 300th helicopter Squadrons of the Royal Netherlands Air Force moving to Gilze-Rijen Air Base. A part of the base remains in use as a glider field. The former USAFE side is in use by Dutch military ground units and is called "Camp New Amsterdam". A lot of old infrastructure, including some aircraft shelters and the Zulu Hangar are still there. The Nationaal Militair Museum opened at the north-eastern part of the base in 2014 and utilizes the area of the former hangars in a new 38,000 square meterbuilding. In 2018, Utrechts Landschap (a private heritage protection organisation) purchased the airbase (except for the museum area and Camp New Amsterdam), comprising about 400 hectares and is currently maintaining protection of both the natural landscape (including habitats of rare and newly discovered insect species) and military remains.

== Lockerbie bombing trial ==
The Scottish Court in the Netherlands sat at the base while conducting the Pan Am Flight 103 bombing trial.

== See also ==
- The Netherlands in World War II
