= EFCC1 =

Protein-coding gene in the species Homo sapiens

Identifiers
- Aliases: EFCC1, C3orf73, CCDC48, EF-hand and coiled-coil domain containing 1
- External IDs: MGI: 3611451; GeneCards: EFCC1

Gene location (Human)
Chr.	Chromosome 3 (human)
Band	3q21.3	Start	129,001,304 bp
Band	3q21.3	End	129,040,742 bp

Gene location (Mouse)
Chr.	Chromosome 6 (mouse)
Band	6|6 D1	Start	87,707,851 bp
Band	6|6 D1	End	87,732,890 bp
RNA expression pattern
Bgee	Human / Mouse (ortholog); Top expressed in: upper lobe of left lung; right lung; apex of heart; testicle; left ovary; muscle layer of sigmoid colon; right ovary; gallbladder; spleen; mucosa of transverse colon / Top expressed in: superior frontal gyrus; primary visual cortex; cerebellar cortex; esophagus; dentate gyrus of hippocampal formation granule cell; mouth; embryo; right kidney; neural tube; mesencephalon; More reference expression data
BioGPS	n/a
Orthologs
Databases	NCBI: entry; OMA: entry
Species	Human	Mouse
Entrez	79825	58229
Ensembl	ENSG00000114654	ENSMUSG00000068263
UniProt	Q9HA90	Q9JJF6
RefSeq (mRNA)	NM_024768; NM_001377500; NM_001377501	NM_001159697; NM_021418
RefSeq (protein)	NP_079044; NP_001364429; NP_001364430	NP_001153169
Location (UCSC)	Chr 3: 129 – 129.04 Mb	Chr 6: 87.71 – 87.73 Mb
PubMed search
- Wikidata
View/Edit Human	View/Edit Mouse

EF-hand and coiled-coil domain containing 1 is a protein that in humans is encoded by the EFCC1 gene.
