= Clinical Chemistry and Laboratory Medicine =

- Discipline: Clinical chemistry, laboratory medicine
- Language: English
- Edited by: Mario Plebani

Publication details
- Former names: Klinische Chemie, European Journal of Clinical Chemistry and Clinical Biochemistry
- History: 1963–present
- Publisher: Walter de Gruyter
- Frequency: Monthly
- Impact factor: 6.8 (2022)

Standard abbreviations
- ISO 4: Clin. Chem. Lab. Med.

Indexing
- CODEN: CCLMFW
- ISSN: 1434-6621 (print); 1437-4331 (web)
- OCLC no.: 475036853

Links
- Journal homepage; Online access; Online archive

Clinical Chemistry and Laboratory Medicine is a monthly peer-reviewed scientific journal that is published by De Gruyter.

== History ==
The journal was established in 1963 as Clinical Chemistry/Klinische Chemie. In 1991 it was renamed to European Journal of Clinical Chemistry and Clinical Biochemistry. In 1998 it obtained its present name.

== Scope ==
The journal covers developments in fundamental and applied research into science related to clinical laboratories. It covers areas such as clinical biochemistry, molecular medicine, hematology, immunology, microbiology, virology, drug measurement, genetic epidemiology, evaluation of diagnostic markers, new reagents and systems, reference materials, and reference values. It also publishes recommendations and news from the International Federation of Clinical Chemistry and Laboratory Medicine and the European Federation of Clinical Chemistry and Laboratory Medicine.

== Abstracting and indexing ==
The journal is abstracted and indexed in:

- CAB Abstracts
- Global Health
- Academic Search
- TOC Premier
- Elsevier BIOBASE
- Embase
- Scopus
- MEDLINE/PubMed
- ProQuest databases
- Biological Abstracts
- BIOSIS Previews
- Current Contents/Life Sciences
- Science Citation Index Expanded

According to the Journal Citation Reports, the journal has a 2022 impact factor of 6.8.

== Associated organizations ==
Clinical Chemistry and Laboratory Medicine is the official journal of the European Federation of Clinical Chemistry and Laboratory Medicine (EFLM). It is also the official journal of the Association of Clinical Biochemists in Ireland, the Belgian Society of Clinical Chemistry, the German United Society of Clinical Chemistry and Laboratory Medicine, the Greek Society of Clinical Chemistry-Clinical Biochemistry, the Italian Society of Clinical Biochemistry and Clinical Molecular Biology, the Slovenian Association for Clinical Chemistry, and the Spanish Society for Clinical Biochemistry and Molecular Pathology.
