= Soesterberg =

- Town
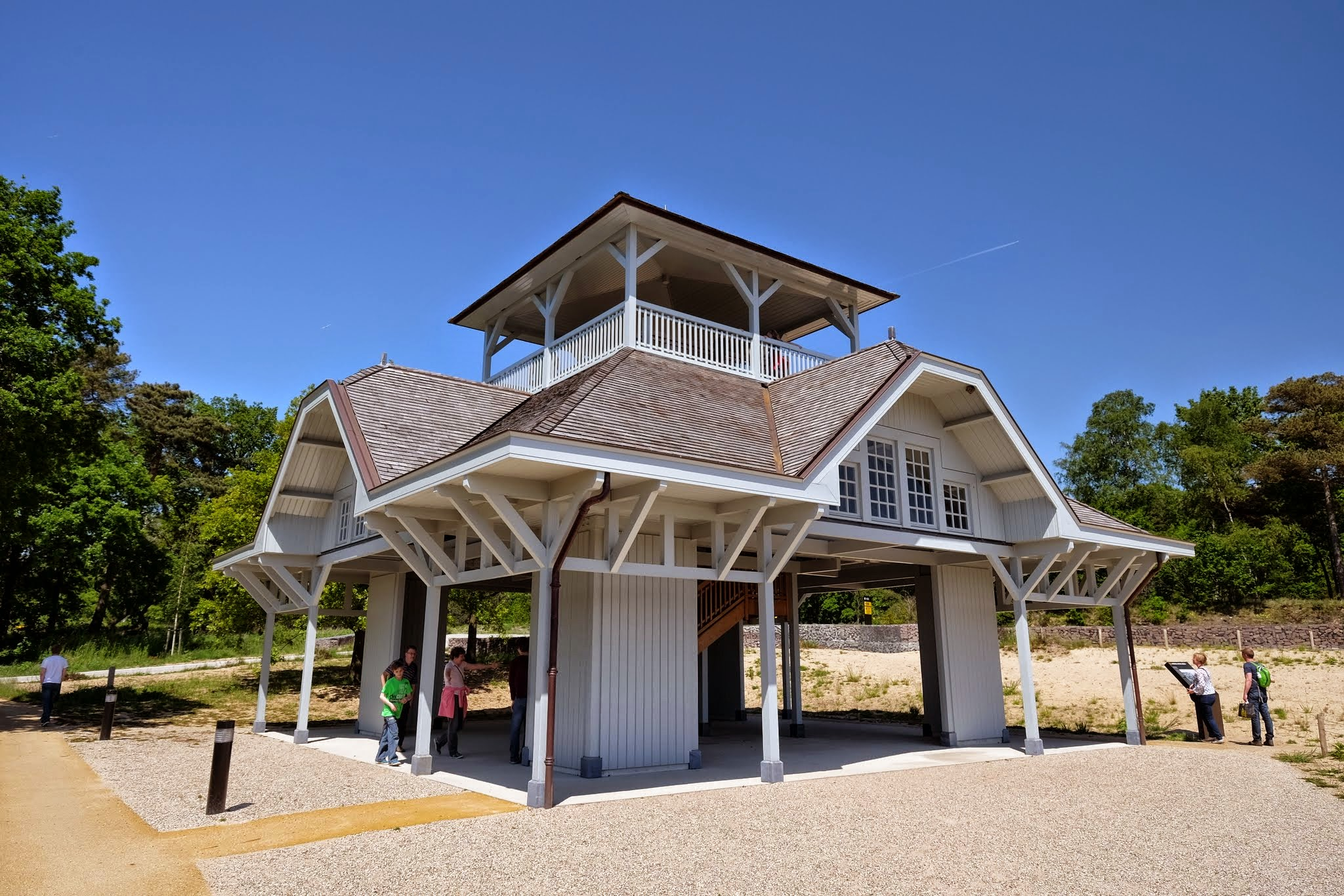
- Building in Soesterberg Air Base

- Location in the Netherlands Soesterberg (Netherlands)
- Coordinates: 52°7′10″N 5°16′59″E
- Country: Netherlands
- Province: Utrecht
- Municipality: Soest

Area
  - Total: 5.62 km^{2} (2.17 sq mi)
- Elevation: 18 m (59 ft)

Population (2021)
  - Total: 7,210
  - Density: 1,280/km^{2} (3,320/sq mi)
- Time zone: UTC+1 (CET)
  - Summer (DST): UTC+2 (CEST)
- Postal code: 3769
- Dialing code: 0346

Soesterberg is a town in the Dutch province of Utrecht. It is a part of the municipality of Soest, and lies about 5 km northeast of Zeist, on the road between Amersfoort and Utrecht. It was the location of Soesterberg Air Base.

== History ==
The town was first mentioned in 1840 as Berg, meaning hill belonging to Soest. In 1840, it was home to 253 people. The military airbase and the tram line Amersfoort–Zeist caused a rapid growth of the village in the 1920s and 1930s. In 1939, a monastery was established by the Society of the Divine Word. In 1940, an officer's casino was built for the German Luftwaffe. It is one of the few remaining buildings in Nazi architectural style in the Netherlands, and has 1.5 metres (4 ft 11 in) thick walls. It was captured intact by the Canadians in 1945, and was used by the KLM and Ministry of Defence. It has been converted into an apartment building.

In 1837, a Catholic church was built which was replaced between 1952 and 1953 by the Carolus Borromeus Church.

== Soesterberg Air Base ==
In 1910, the heathland north of the village was used as an airfield. The Dutch Airforce (then called LuchtVaartafdeling or LVa, literally airdriving department) was established here in 1913. From 1954 to 1994, Soesterberg Air Base became a NATO base for the United States Air Force 32nd FS (originally 512th FDS later it became 32nd FD, 32nd FIS, and 32nd TFS), and the village of Soesterberg housed a number of American families. The 32nd is the only US military unit that has been under direct operational control of a foreign nation (operational control fell to the Dutch military). It was the home of the Dutch army helicopter force until the base's closure in 2010 due to the reduction of the Dutch military establishment. It is now the location of the Nationaal Militair Museum, which opened in 2014. Nearby Kamp van Zeist is the site of the Lockerbie trial of Libyan agents who blew up Pan Am Flight 103 over the Scottish town of Lockerbie in 1988.

Today the Dutch Ministry of Defence still operate a few facilities around the airbase.

== Gallery ==
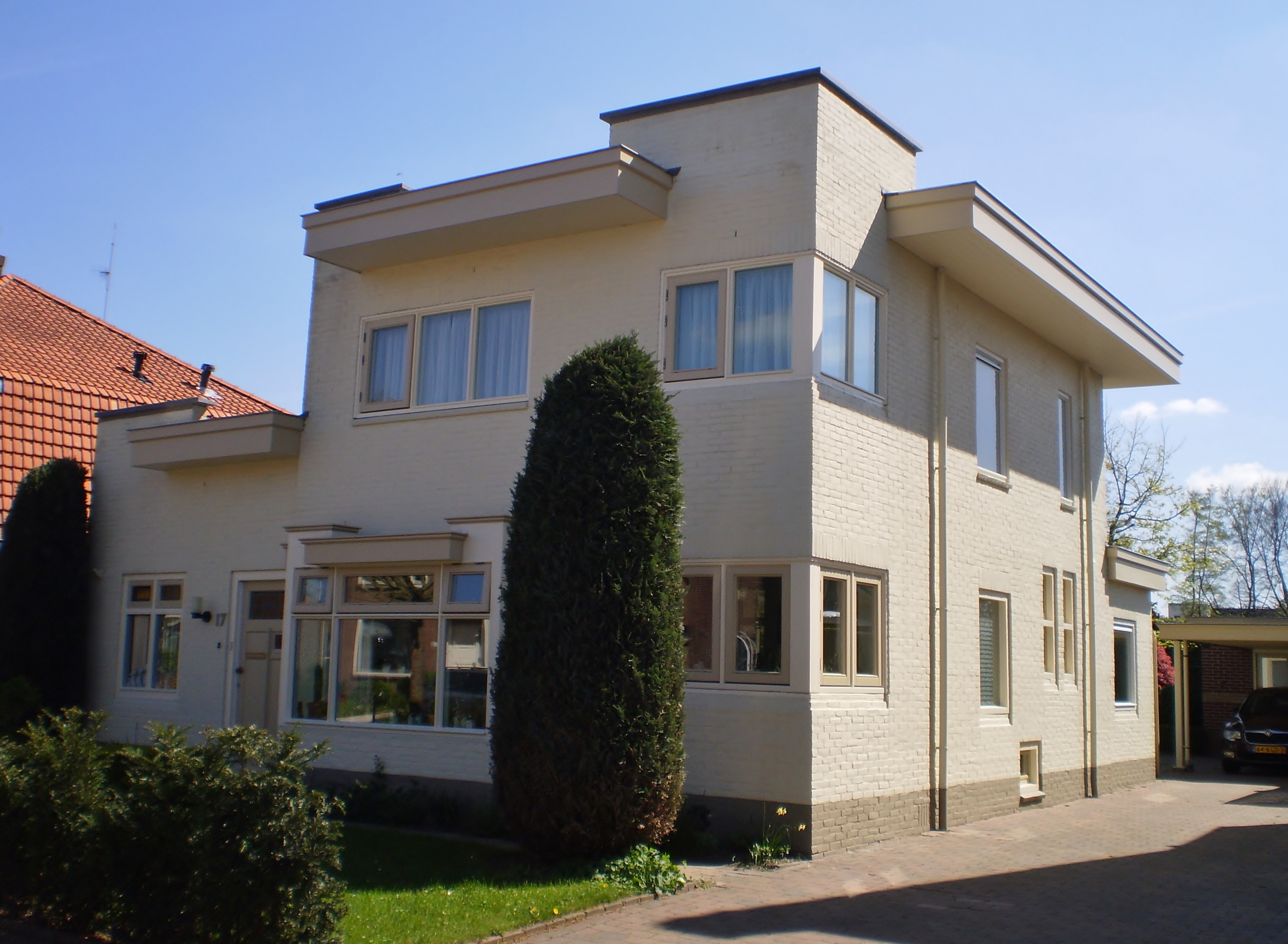
Former post office

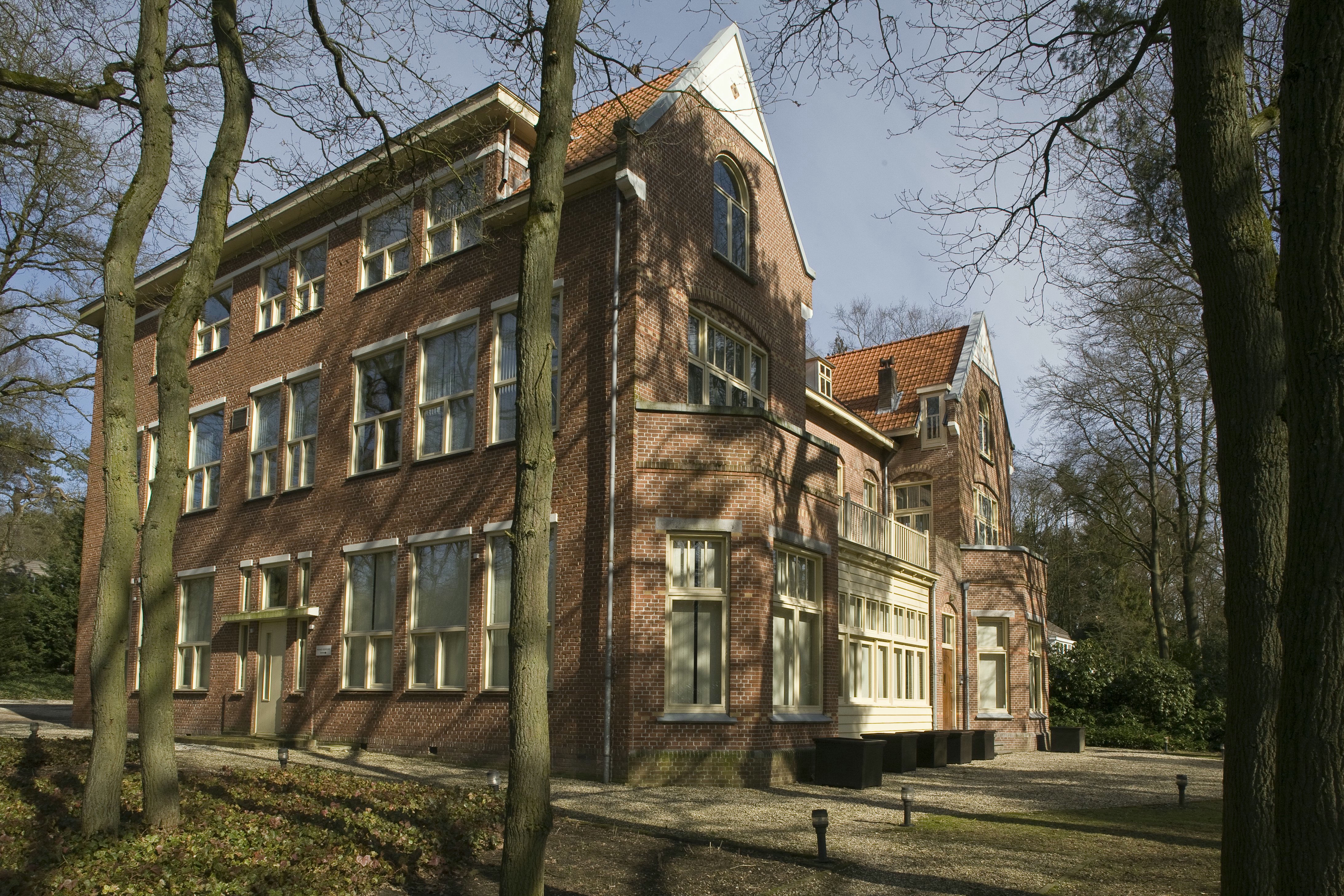
Colony house De Stompert

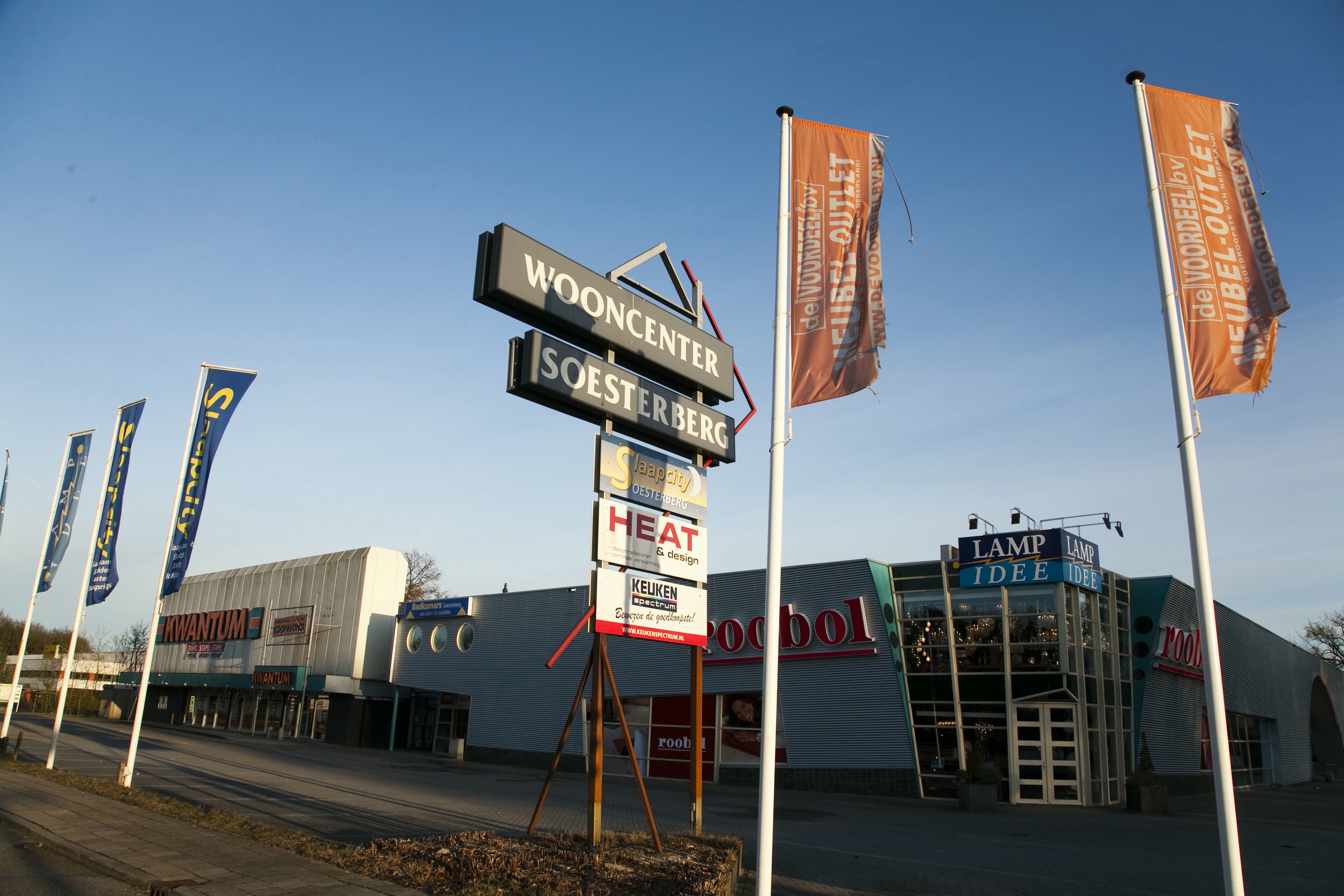
Shopping centre

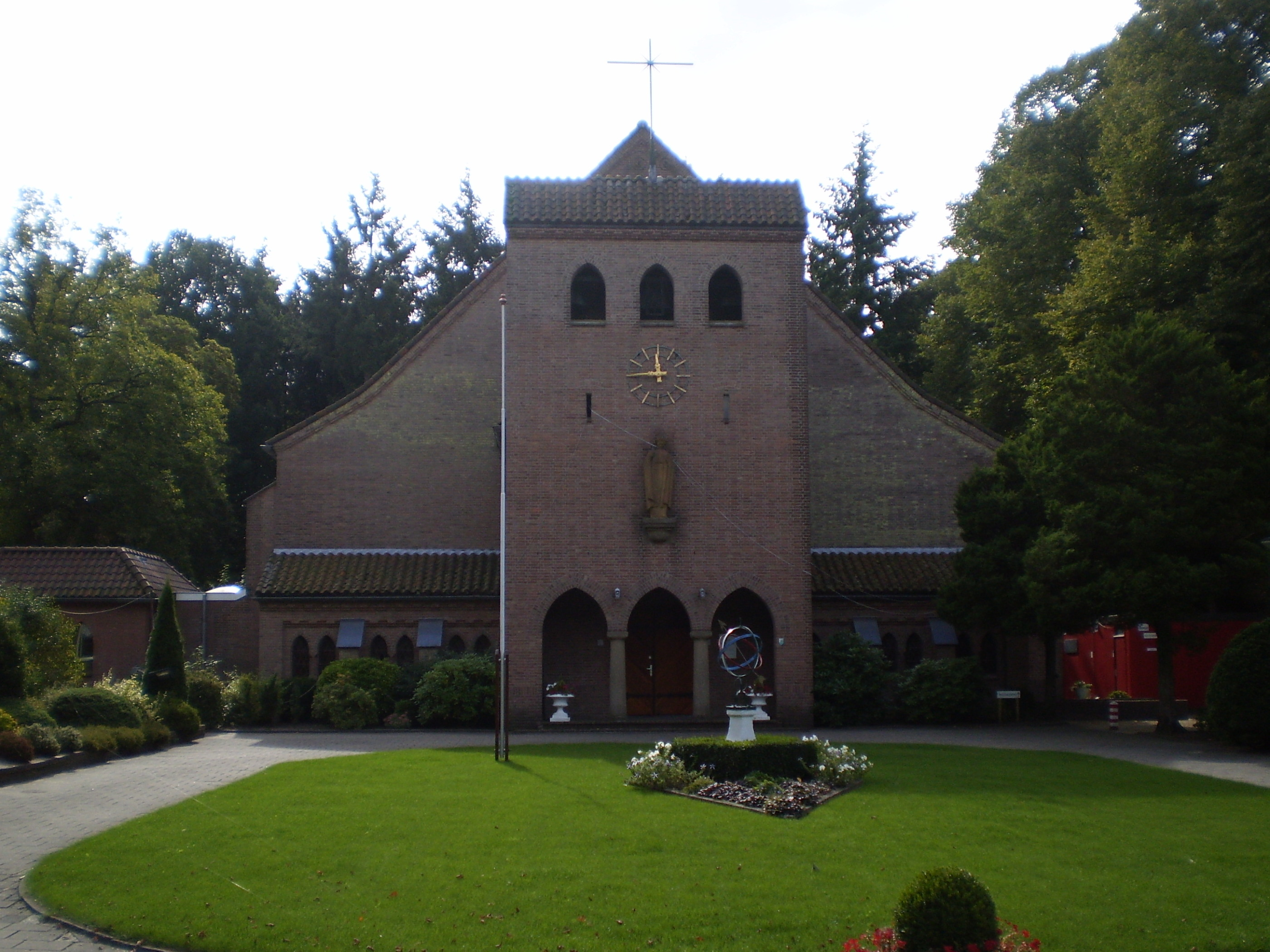
Carolus Borromeus Church

== See also ==
- Scouting in Soesterberg
