= European Federation of Clinical Chemistry and Laboratory Medicine =

International medical association

Official logo

The European Federation of Clinical Chemistry and Laboratory Medicine (EFLM) (formerly EFCC) is a federation of national member societies of clinical chemistry and laboratory medicine from Europe. EFLM has its registered office in Brussels and its administrative office in Milan. EFLM is the European Regional member of the International Federation of Clinical Chemistry and Laboratory Medicine (IFCC)

== History ==
EFLM was created from the merger of two precursor organisations, The Federation of European Societies of Clinical Chemistry (FESCC), (a European representative of the International Federation of Clinical Chemistry and Laboratory Medicine, IFCC) and the European Community Confederation of Clinical Chemistry (EC4) at the EuroMedlab meeting in Amsterdam in 2007.

Both precursor organizations arose in the 1970s. The increasing overlap between the European Union, represented by EC4 and FESCC, representing geographical Europe, meant that merger was appropriate.

== Operations ==
EFLM has an Executive Board and a range of committees for: science, education and training, quality and regulations, communication and professional representation. Each committee has working groups with a Chair and three full members, there is also a Young Scientist member and they may also have corresponding members, but only one member form each country is permitted.

The Science Committee develops collaborative science in Laboratory Medicine between member organisations or individuals and guidelines to set standards of practice to assist member societies in providing quality patient care. The output of the scientific working groups is scientific papers and presentations which contribute to the science of laboratory medicine internationally; a list of publications can be found on the EFLM web-site (link below). Typically publications are peer-reviewed and published in the journal Clinical Chemistry and Laboratory Medicine. The Working Groups are overseen by the Chair of the Science Committee and their activities reviewed annually; scientific and clinically relevant output determine whether they continue.

The Education and Training Committee runs educational activities particularly for trainees and those required to develop new skills as well as running scientific and clinical conferences, webinars, etc. The major Congress is Euromedlab held in conjunction with the IFCC, meetings are selected from bids by member societies at the annual General Meeting. These are a major forum for scientific and medical knowledge exchange and is allied with a large exhibition of In Vitro Diagnostic industry equipment.

The Quality and Regulations Committee is particularly focussed on contributing to revisions of International standards such ISO 15189 and ISO 22870 which govern standards in medical laboratories; they also contribute to European Regulations and Directives such as the IVD (In Vitro Diagnostics) Regulations. These regulations and standards ensure quality results are delivered for patient care a key issue in diagnosis and monitoring of health and disease and are under regular international review.

The Communications Committee provides information on EFLM activities to members and promotes awareness of EFLM

The Profession Committee is responsible for the Register of Specialists in Laboratory Medicine and that applicants meet the standards set for eligibility. The need for comparable attainments of qualification, education and experience is a patient safety issue as patients can freely move across borders.

All offices are by election. Member societies have national representatives who vote on behalf of their society. The only automatic office is President who will have been elected as Vice President. Working group members are chosen from member society nominations.

The journal published by De Gruyter, Clinical Chemistry and Laboratory Medicine is the EFLM official journal.

To date two strategic conferences have been held to advance the profession in Europe:

- the first was in Milan, Italy in 2015 addressing the issues of methodological harmonisation and traceability,
- the second in Mannheim, Germany to consider the impact of the digital revolution and its transformation for delivering services for patients.
