= List of stins in Friesland =

This is a list of stins in Friesland in The Netherlands.

| Name | Municipality | Constructed | Demolished | Image |
|---|---|---|---|---|
| Abbingastate | Leeuwarden | Before 1402 | 1859 | |
| Andringastate | Boarnsterhim | 1790 | 1894 | |
| Crackstate | Heerenveen | 1608 | | Crackstate |
| Dekemastate | Leeuwarderadeel | | | Dekemastate |
| Epemastate | Sneek | 1625 | | Epema State |
| Fogelsangh State | Kollumerland c.a. | | | Fogelsangh State |
| Harsta State | Ferwerderadiel | 1511 | | Harsta State |
| Heremastate | Skarsterlân | 1679 | | |
| Hoytema State | Wûnseradiel | 1503 | 1906 | Hoytema State |
| Idemahuis | Westergeest (Kollumerland) | <1467 | ? | |
| Groot Idema State | Driezum (Dantumadiel) | <1515 | ? | |
| Jellema State | Oosterend | ? | <1844 | |
| Jongema State | Boarnsterhim | 15th century | 1912 | |
| Liauckama State | Franekeradeel | 14th century | | Liauckama State |
| Martenahuis | Waadhoeke | 1502 | | Martenahuis |
| Martenastate | Leeuwarderadeel | | | Martenastate |
| Oenemastate | Heerenveen | 1640 | | Oenemastate |
| Osinga State | Skarsterlân | | | Osinga state |
| Papinga stins | Leeuwarden | | | |
| Poptaslot | Menaldumadeel | 1640 | | Poptaslot |
| Ropta State | Dongeradeel | before 1297 | 1731 | |
| Skierstins | Veenwouden | c. 1300 | | Skierstins |
| Sjaerdemaslot | Franekeradeel | 1446 | 1725 | Sjaerdemaslot |
| Tjaarda State | Dantumadeel | 1242 | after 1834 | |
| Unia State | Littenseradiel | | | |
| Walta State | Wûnseradiel | | | |
| Ylostins | IJlst | | | |

== See also ==
- List of castles in the Netherlands
- List of borgs in Groningen (province)
