= Dekemastate =

Stins in Jelsum, Netherlands

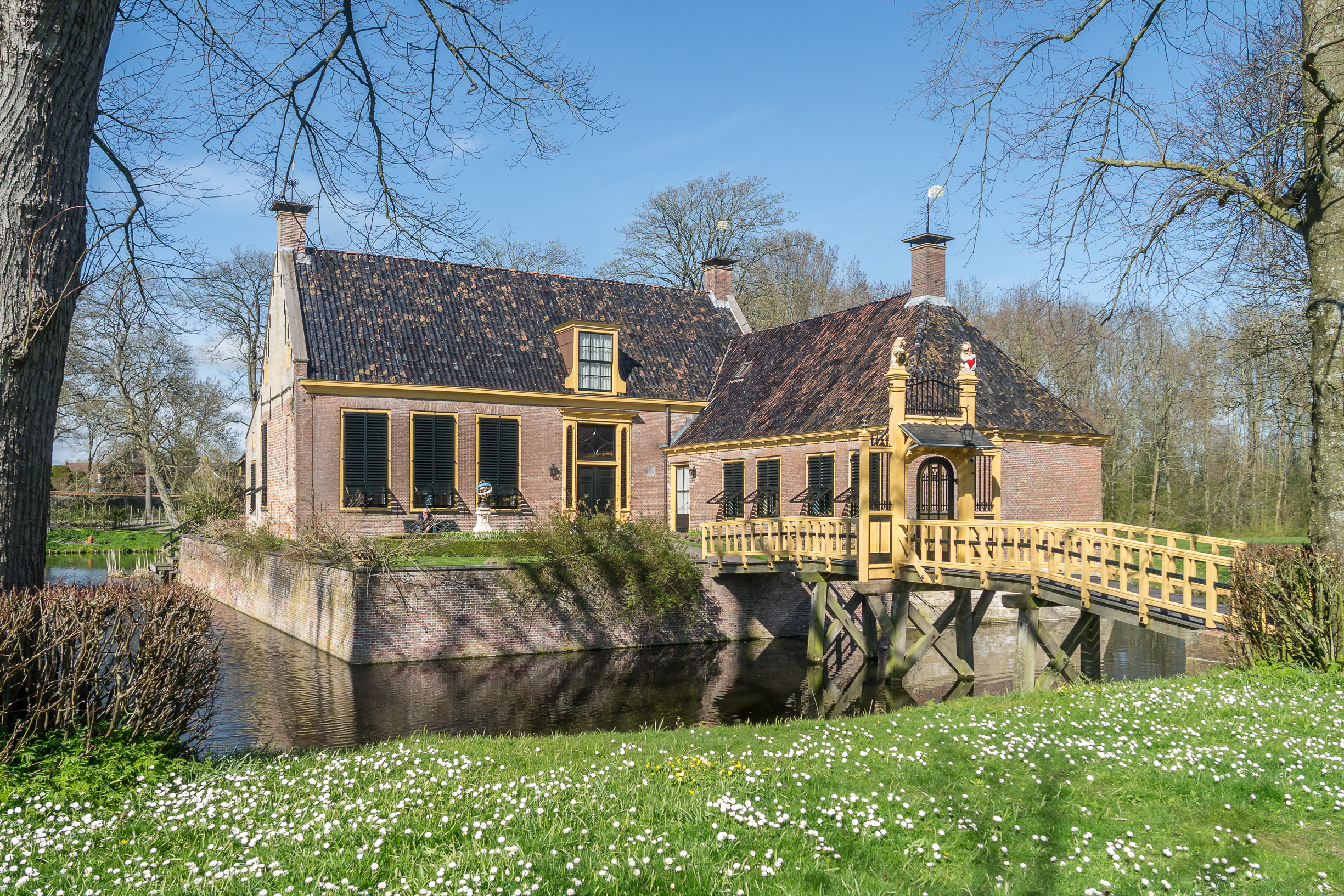
- Dekemastate
- Interactive map of the Dekemastate area
- Former names: Fetza State, Camstra State
- Alternative names: Dekema State

General information
- Status: Museum
- Type: Stins
- Location: Dekemawei 5, 9057 LC, Jelsum, Friesland, Netherlands
- Coordinates: 53°13′59.63″N 5°47′1.02″E
- Named for: Dekema family
- Year built: Late 15th century
- Owner: Stichting Old Burger Weeshuis

Design and construction
- Designations: Rijksmonument (nr. 514007)

Website
- www.dekemastate.nl

The Dekemastate or Dekema State is a stins in the Dutch village of Jelsum, Friesland. It was probably built in the late 15th century on the location of a zaalstins ('hall stins') from the 14th century. The estate currently functions as a museum.

== History ==
As is the case with many Frisian estates, the Dekemastate grew out of a simple square, defensible stone house, a stins, from the 14th century. Archaeological finds on the site show that the place was already inhabited in the 12th and 13th centuries. The first known mention of the stins was in 1486, then called Fetza State. The name changed to Camstra State when the Camstra family came to live there in the 15th century. The Camstra family became involved in the conflict between the Schieringers and Vetkopers and as such, in 1492, the old stins was destroyed and almost immediately rebuilt. At the beginning of the 16th century, Reynsk van Camstra married Hette van Dekema. Despite the later owners, Unia, Doys, Houth, and Van Wageningen, the estate has retained the name Dekemastate to this day.

In 1791, the heiress Juliana Elisabeth Maria Houth married Gerardus van Wageningen from Dordrecht. Through this marriage, the house came to the Van Wageningen family, who lived there for over two hundred years, until 1996. The house was extensively renovated and modernised in 1814 by order of Gerard van Wageningen, which included the demolition of the upper floor of the house. The last Van Wageningen to own the estate, another Gerard, offered hospitality to, among others, the famous detective writer Havank. In 1990, Gerard van Wageningen founded the Association of Friends of Dekema State, after which he arranged the transfer of the estate to the foundation Stichting Old Burger Weeshuis in Leeuwarden. For several years now, the estate has been open to visitors and is no longer inhabited.

The complex of the Dekemastate including surrounding historical structures was registered as a rijksmonument in 2005.

== Garden ==
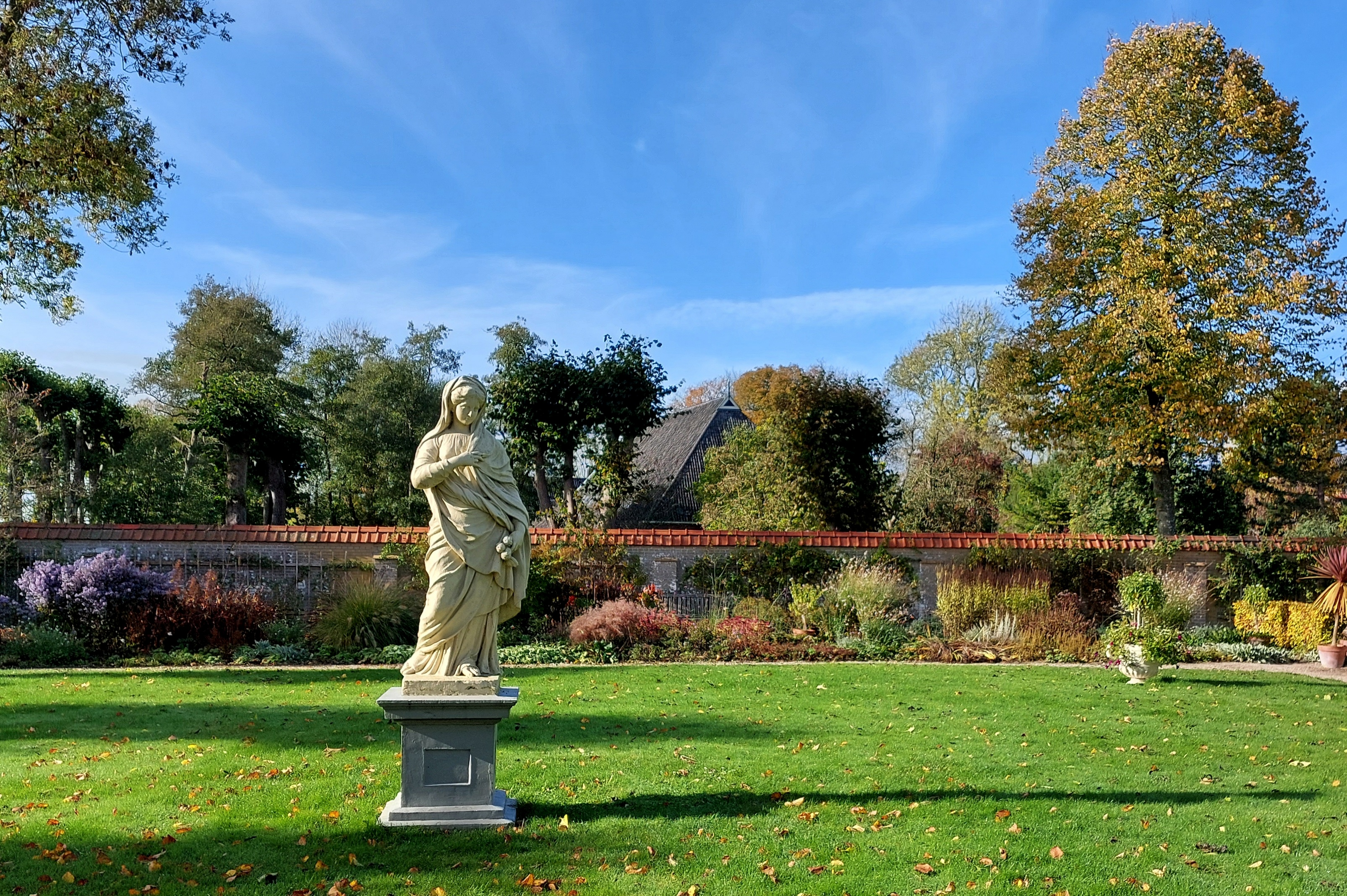
Partial view of the garden

The building is surrounded by a classical garden complex. This consists of a walled garden, which is mainly used as a kitchen garden, and a park-like area. In the spring, many so-called stins plants can be admired here. Wild tulips and drooping star-of-Bethlehem grow along the driveway. There is also wild garlic, Italian arum, and dusky crane's-bill.

From the 17th century onwards, the gardens were increasingly adapted to the changing fashions in the field of gardens. The layout around Dekemastate was less subject to fashion fads because the yields from the lands were paramount. The gardens mainly served to provide for the residents' basic needs. Nevertheless, different styles of garden layouts can be recognised at Dekemastate. The garden was plainly designed and planted. Ditches, an orchard, and a vegetable garden completed the whole. From 1702 to 1706, J.G. Semler is said to have worked at Dekemastate. Semler was the stadtholder's gardener and responsible for the maintenance of the Prinsentuin in Leeuwarden.

== Museum ==
The stins is furnished to represent the period just before the Second World War, around 1930. For the furnishing, use was made of paintings and furniture that traditionally belonged to Dekemastate and objects that came from elsewhere, such as objects loaned from the Fries Museum. Throughout the estate hangs a collection of family portraits of the residents, of which the oldest dates from 1587.

== Gallery ==
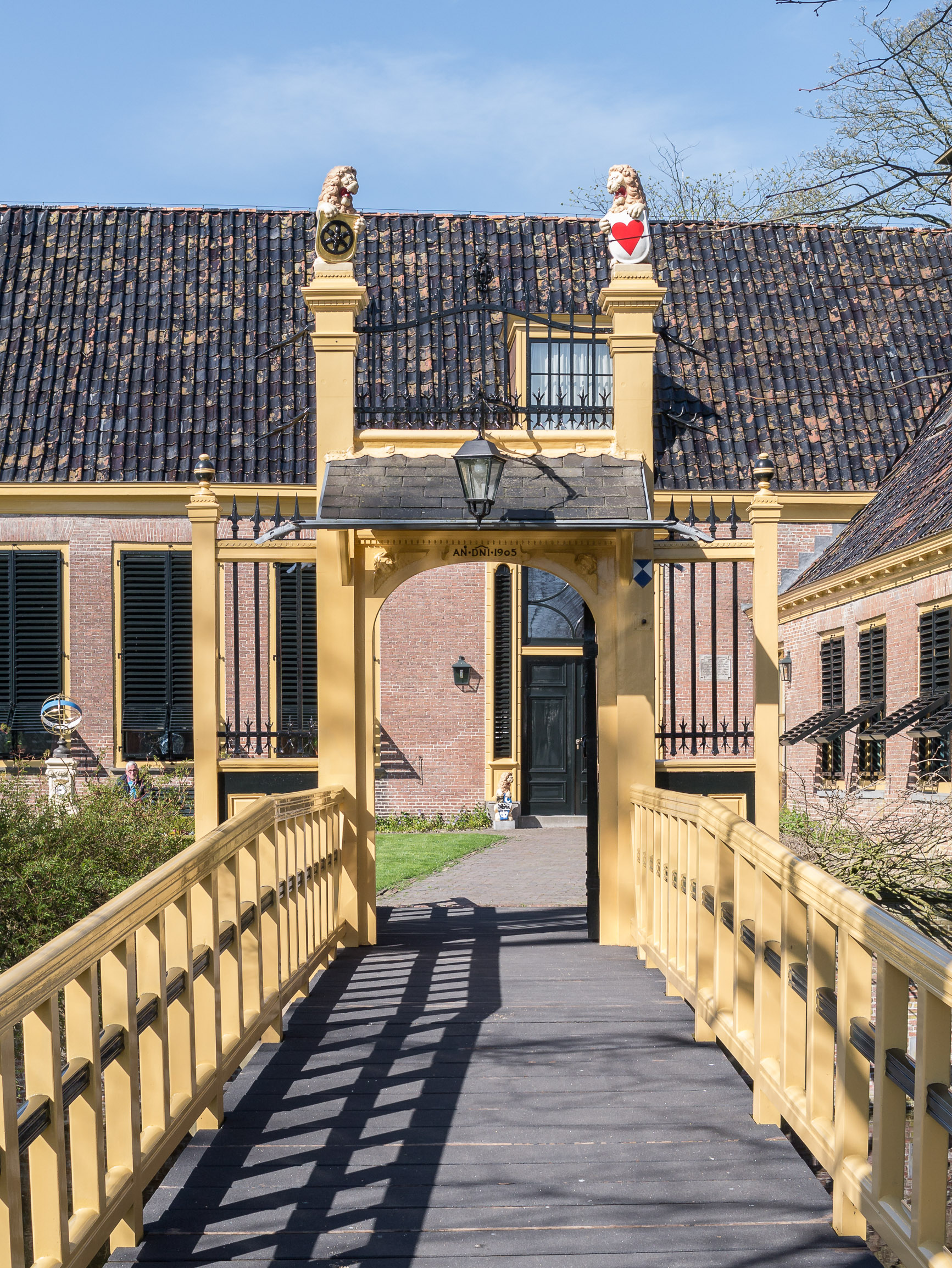
Bridge and entrance

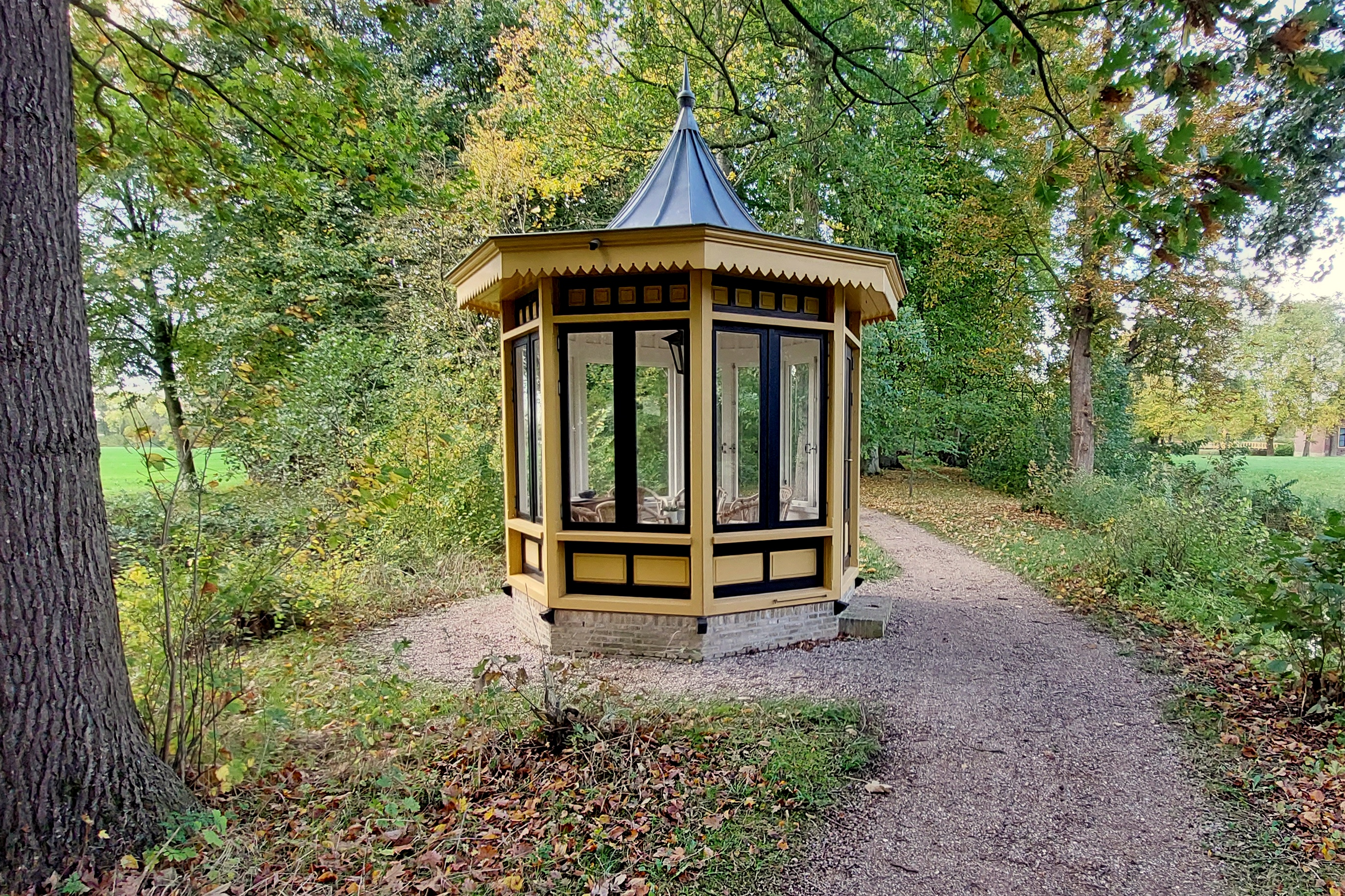
Pavilion

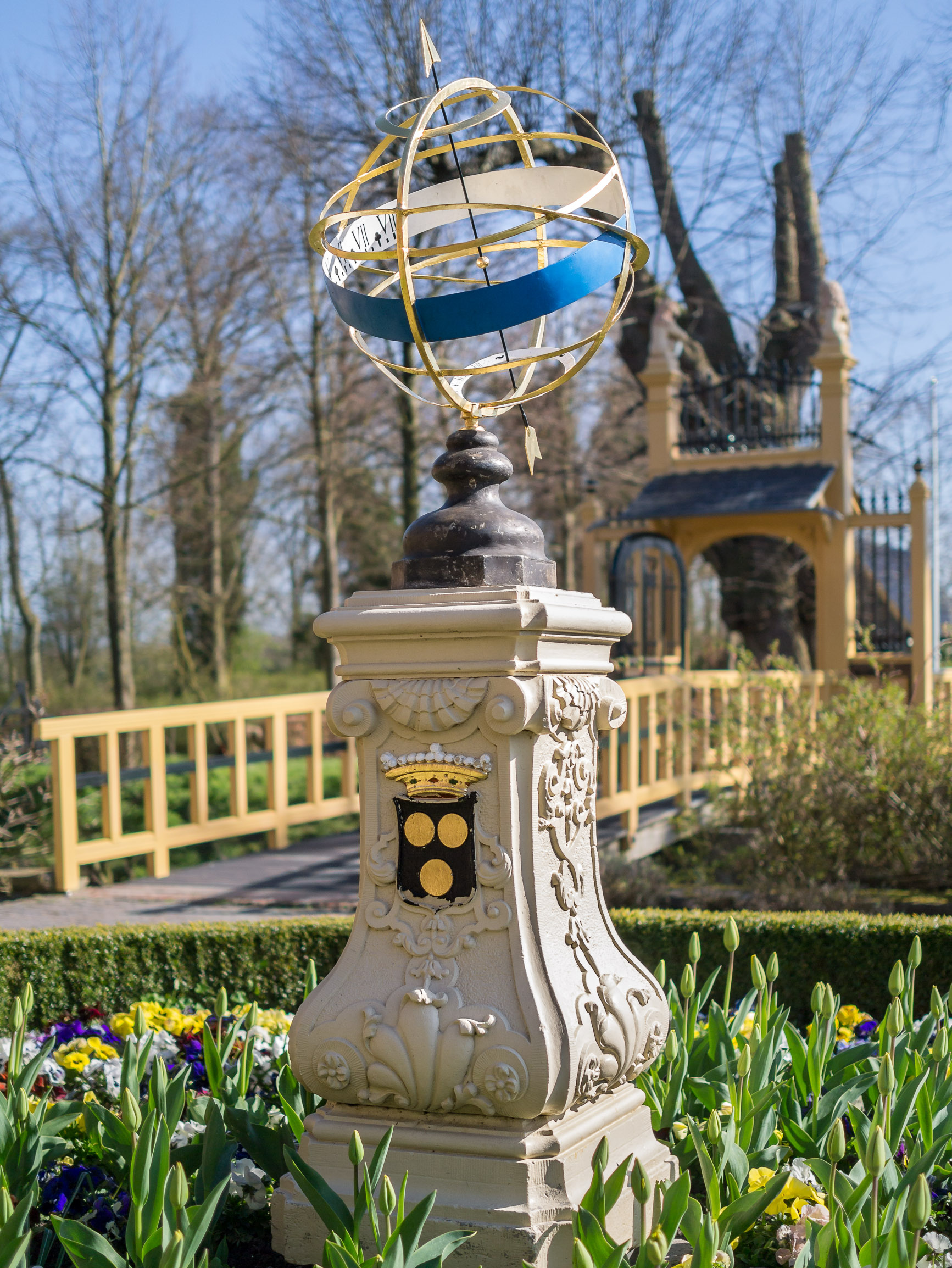
Sun dial

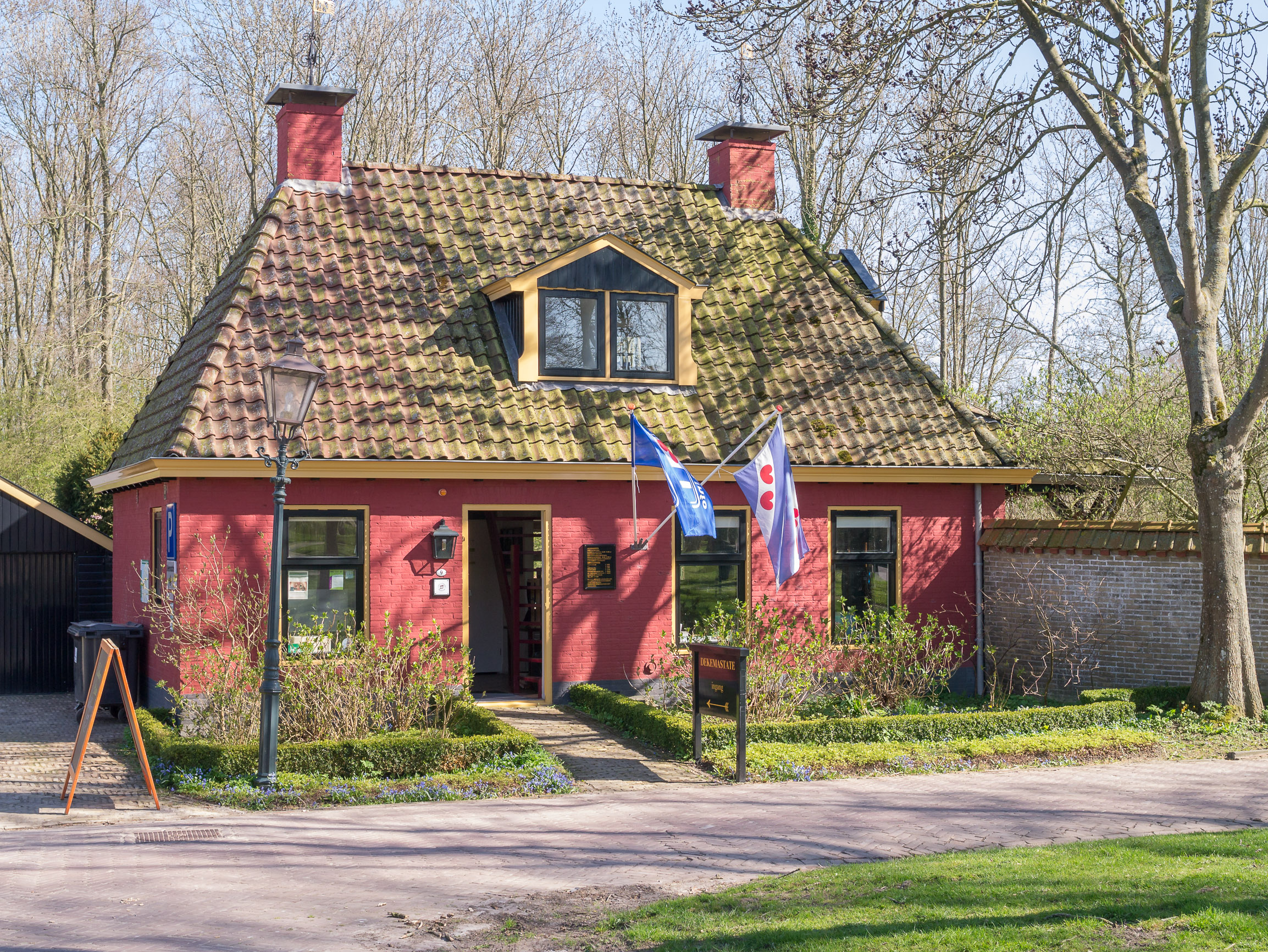
Gardener's house

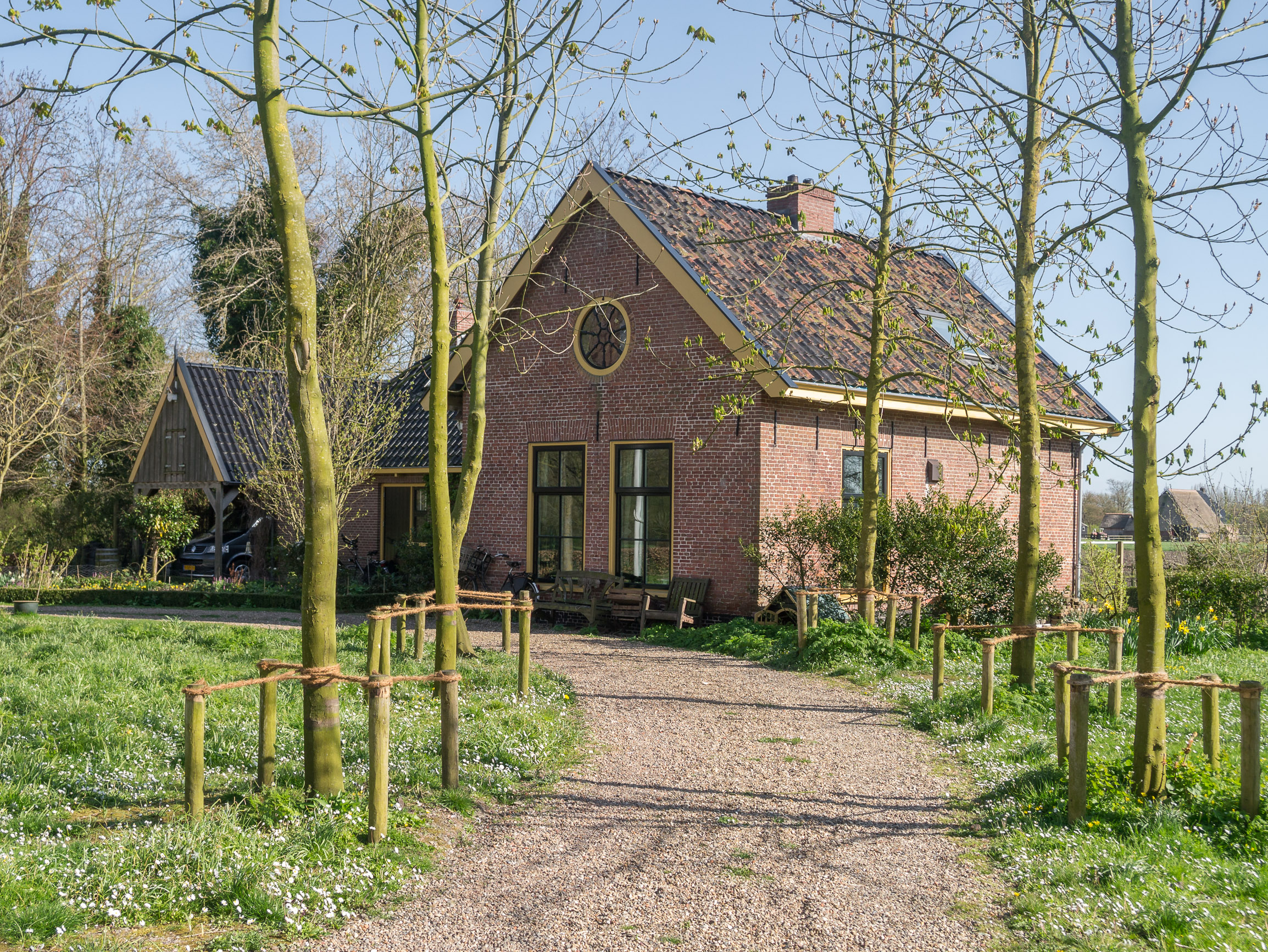
Coach house

== See also ==
- List of stins in Friesland
