= Jelsum =

- Village
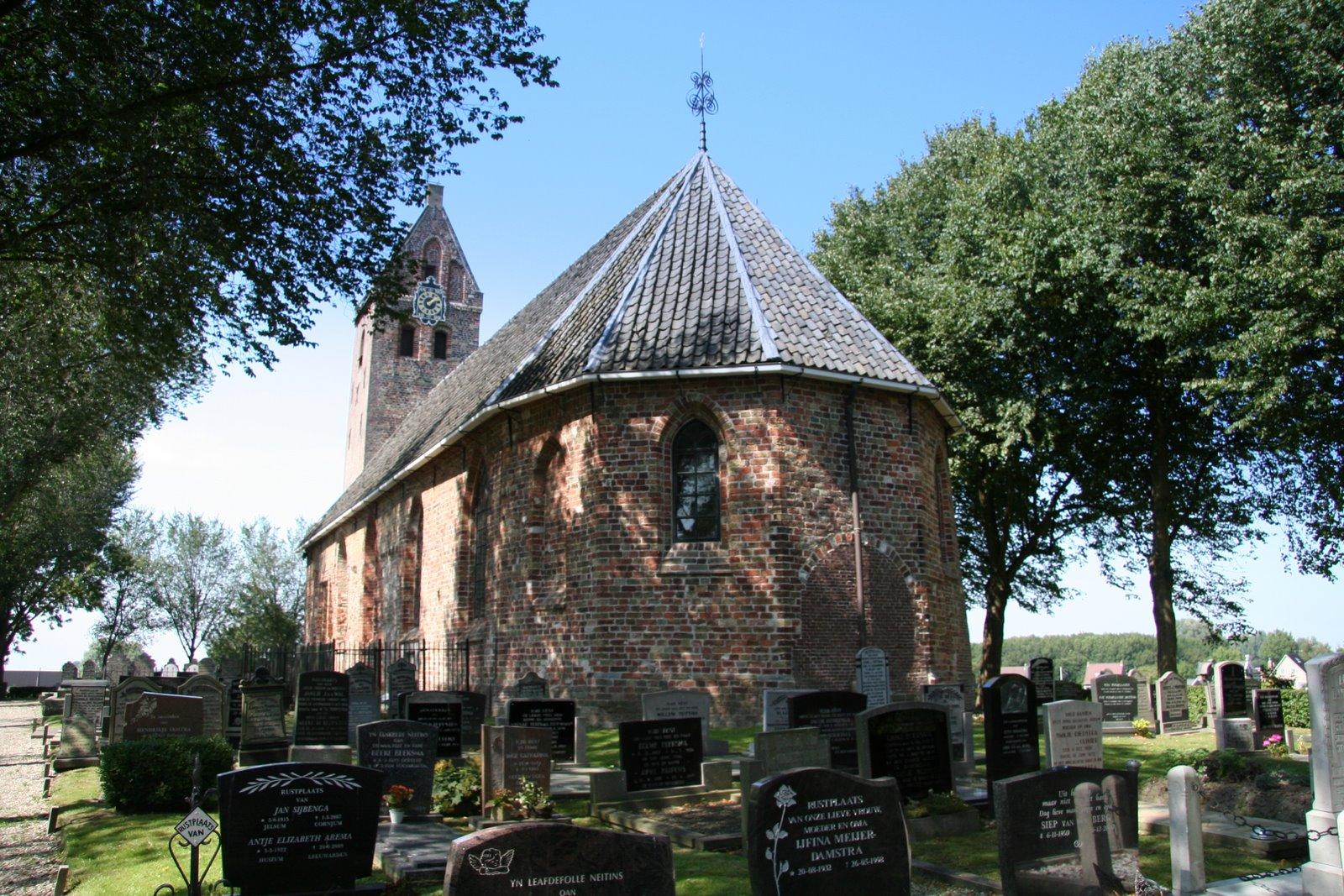
- Jelsum Church

- Flag

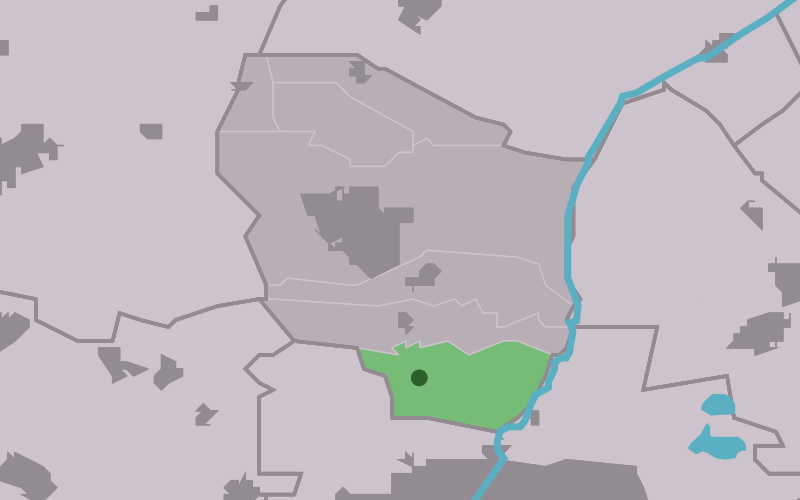
- Location in Leeuwarderadeel municipality

- Location in the Netherlands Jelsum (Netherlands)
- Country: Netherlands
- Province: Friesland
- Municipality: Leeuwarden

Area
  - Total: 5.31 km^{2} (2.05 sq mi)
- Elevation: 0.4 m (1.3 ft)

Population (2021)
  - Total: 310
  - Density: 58/km^{2} (150/sq mi)
- Time zone: UTC+1 (CET)
  - Summer (DST): UTC+2 (CEST)
- Postal code: 9057
- Dialing code: 058

Jelsum is a village in Leeuwarden municipality in the province of Friesland, the Netherlands. It had a population of around 195 in January 2017. The stins Dekemastate is located in Jelsum.

== History ==
The village was first mentioned in 1270 as Heilsum, and means "settlement of the people of Helle (person / hero)". Jelsum is a terp (artificial living mound) village which probably had its origins before Christ. The Dutch Reformed church dates from the 12th century and has a 13th-century tower. The choir was renewed in the 15th century. The church was restored in 1913 and 1999. In 1840, Jelsum was home to 262 people.

The stins Dekemastate was probably built in the 13th century. It is a fortified rectangular house surrounded by a moat and a stone wall. The original estate was destroyed in 1492 and again in 1498 by the citizens of Leeuwarden. The tower was probably demolished around 1700. The building was modified many times during its history, and currently houses a museum. The stins is surrounded by a large park.

Before 2018, the village was part of the Leeuwarderadeel municipality.

== Gallery ==
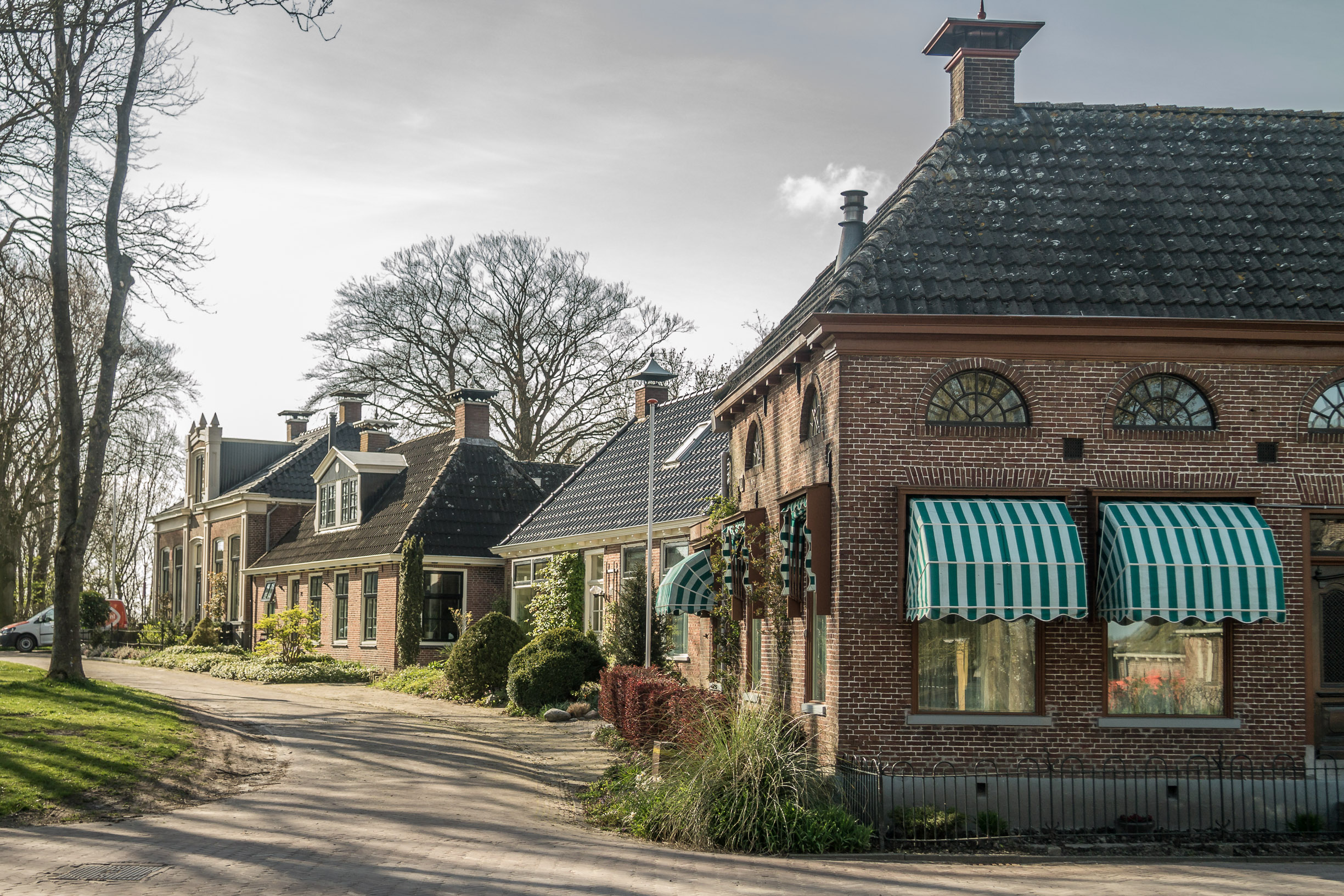
Houses in Jelsum

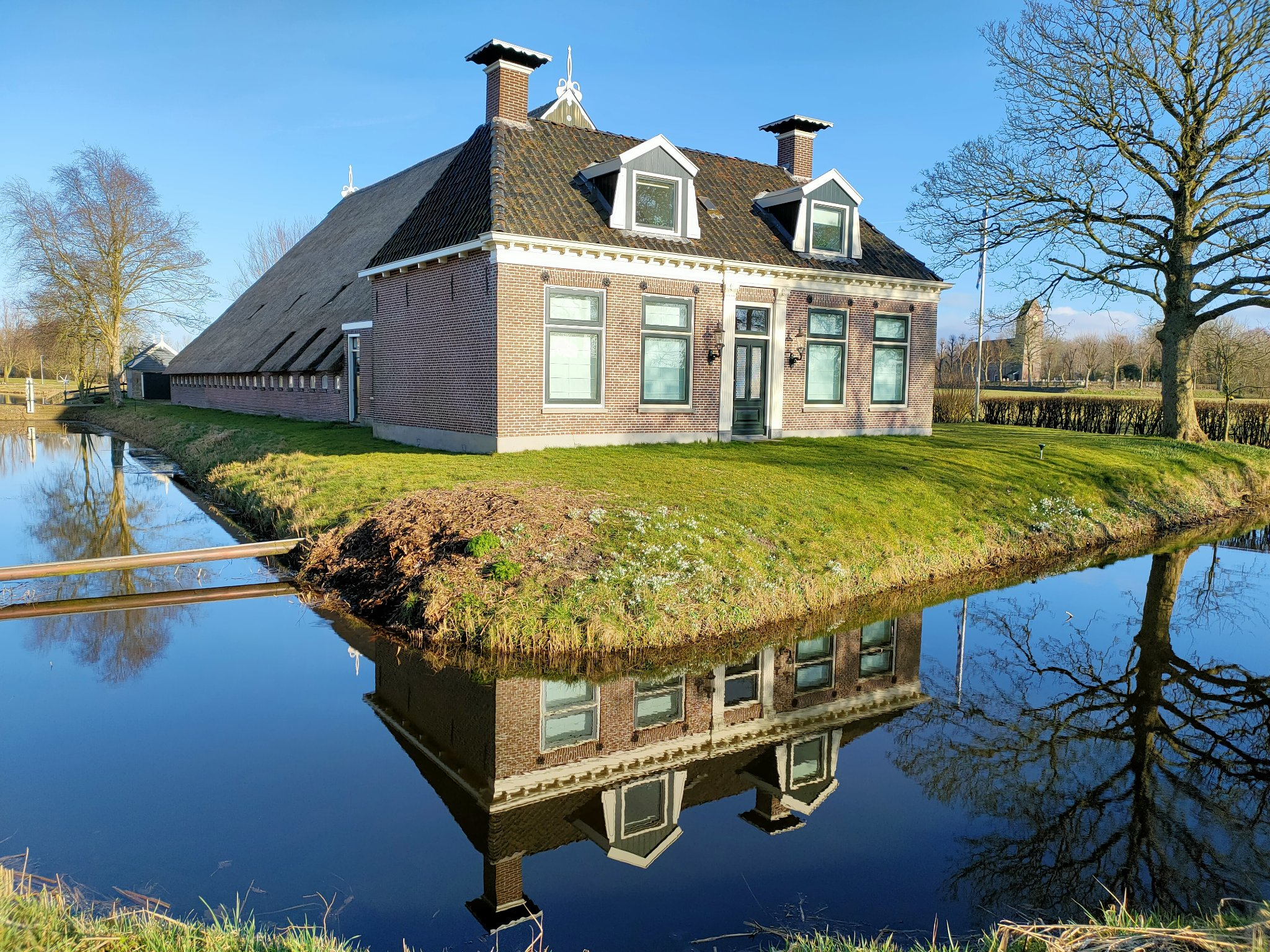
Farm in Jelsum

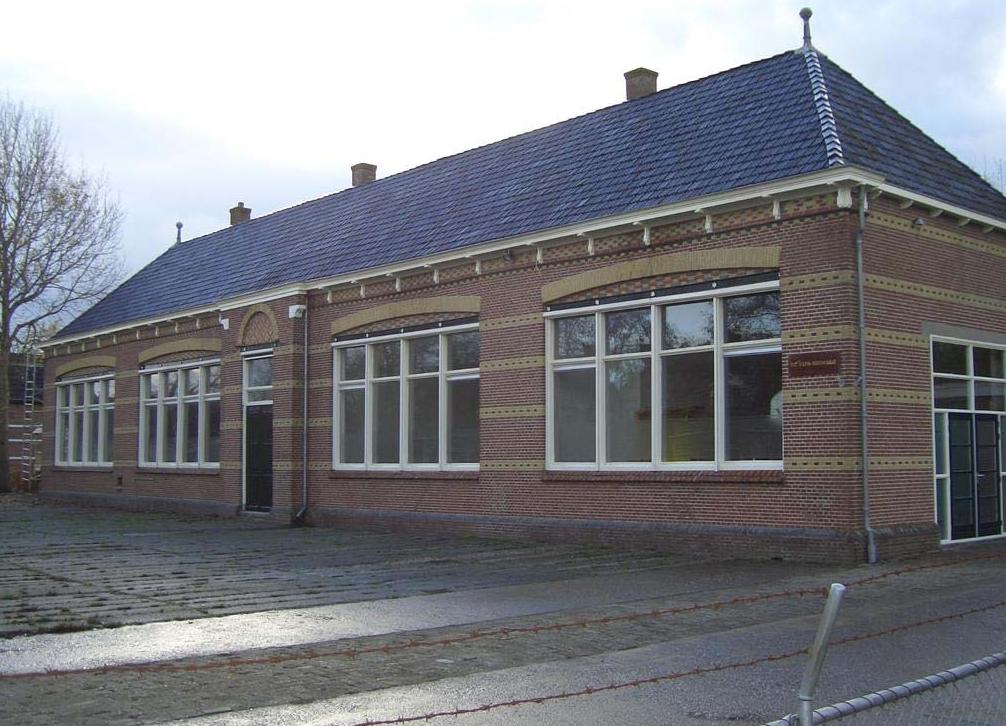
Former school

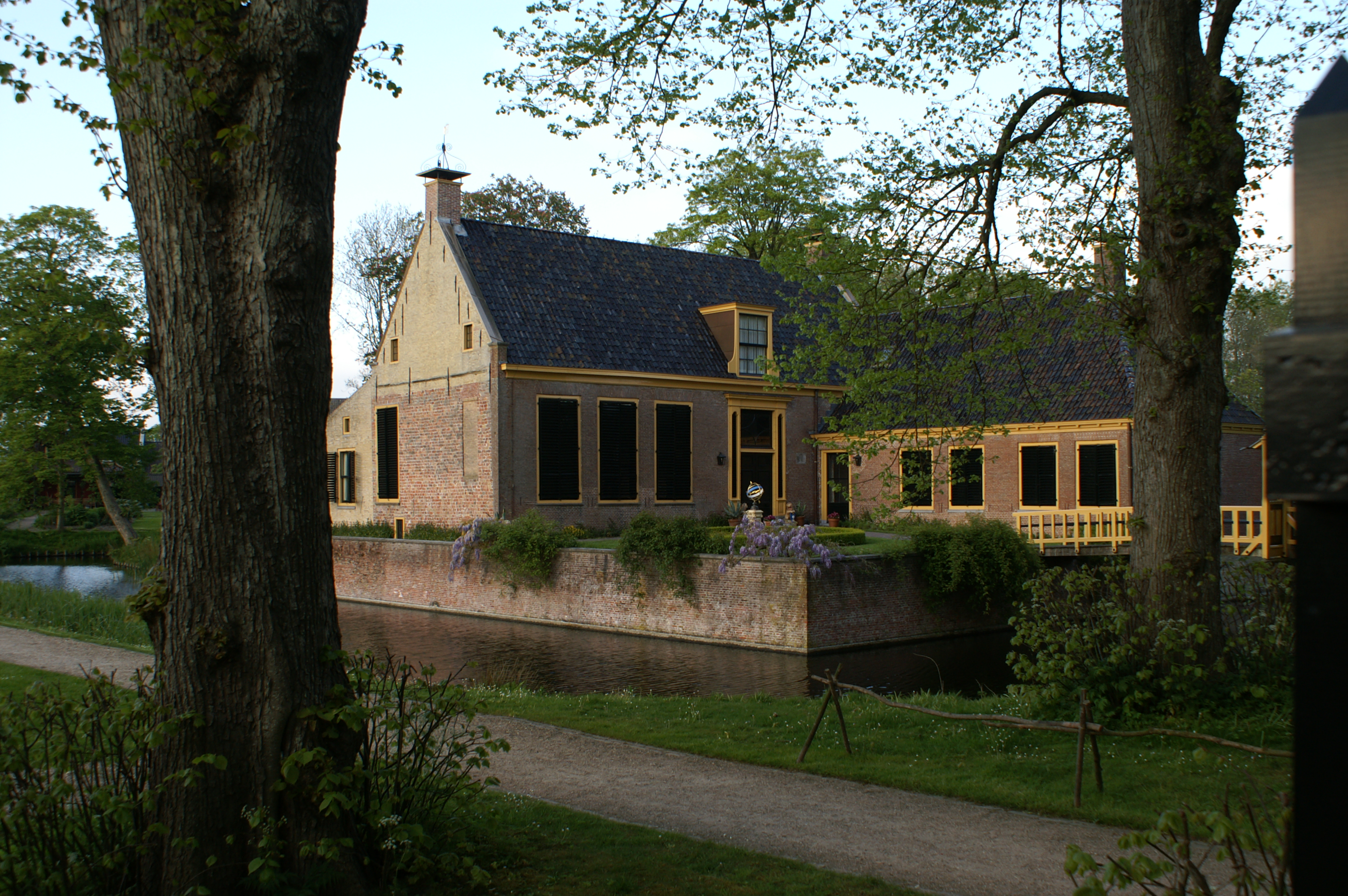
Dekemastate stins (villa)
