= Krystkongres =

Student congress

The Krystkongres (Christmas-congress) is the annually held congress for members of the Frisian student societies in the Netherlands.

The first Krystkongres was held in 1931. Usually the congress takes place in the city of Frjentsjer, a formerly academic town in the province Friesland (Fryslân in West Frisian). The West Frisian language is used in the lectures and debates, although some lectures have been in German, Dutch, or English.
