= Martenastate =

Ancestral home of the Martena family in Cornjum, Friesland

Coordinates: 53°14′39″N 5°47′01″E

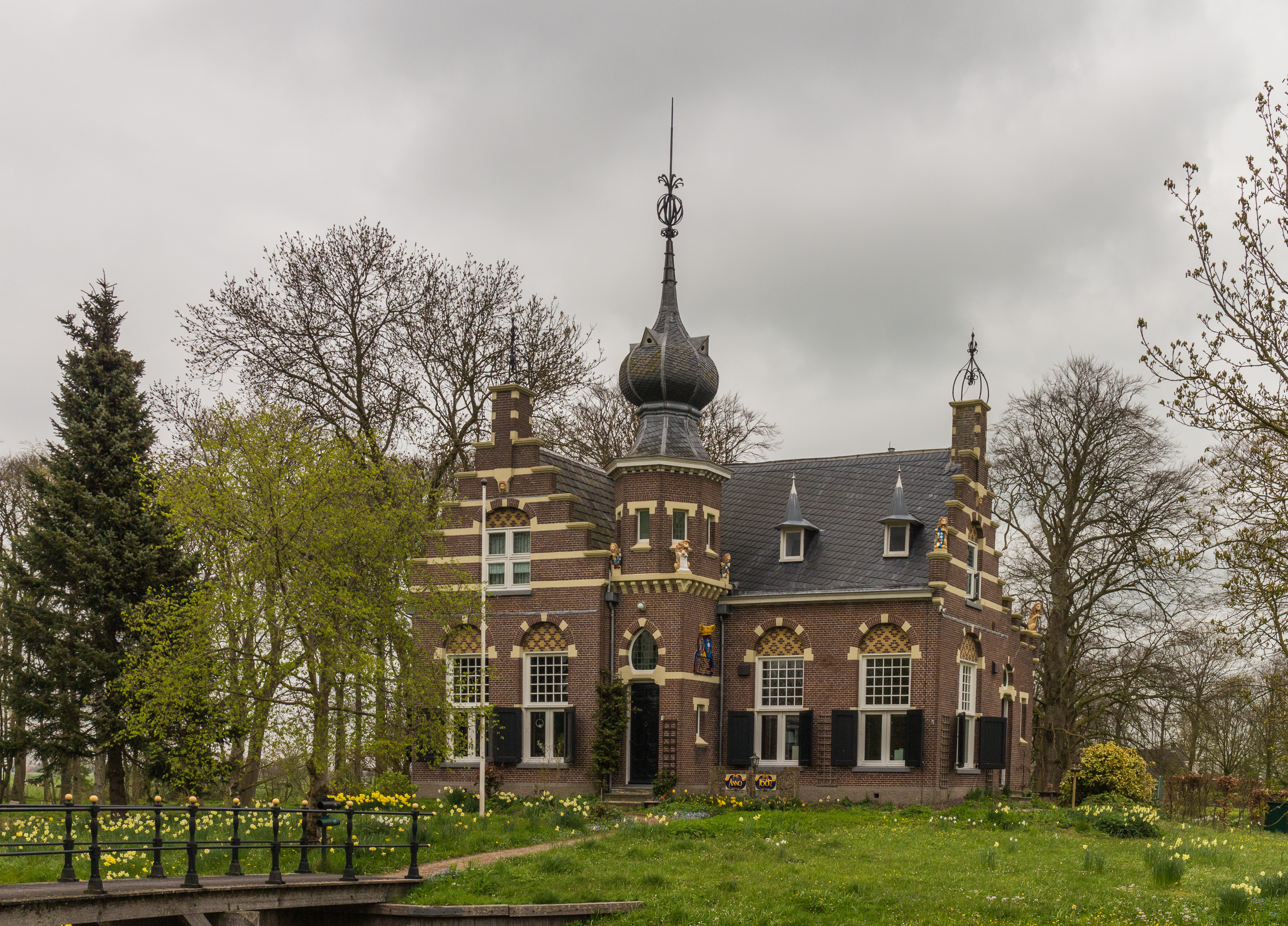
The rebuilt Martenastate in the early 1900s

Martenastate (Martena estate) in Cornjum, Netherlands, is an ancestral estate first owned by the noble family Martena, also written as van Martena, or even Martna (i.e., Martena without an e). This family belonged to the Dutch nobility (hoofdelingen). The building is now a museum.

The first mention of a stins at the Martenastate in Cornjum dates back to 1468, when the family Martena lived there. The last male ancestor of the Martena line was Doecke van Martena, who died in 1605.

After 1605, the Martenastate in Cornjum was owned and occupied by a succession of other noble families: the Aylva family, the Burmania family, and the Vegelin van Claerbergen family.

On December 28, 1894 the last owner-occupant of Martena State in Cornjum, jonkheer Duco Martena van Burmania Vegelin van Claerbergen, died. He left the state to the church of Cornjum. In 1899, the house on the Martenastate was demolished, after which the present Martenastate was built, designed in neo-renaissance style by architect Pyter de Groot.

There is a picture of the original Martenastate, Cornjum, in the Fries Museum (Leeuwarden), drawn by Jacobus Stellingwerf, dated 1722.

== Martenahuis in Franeker ==
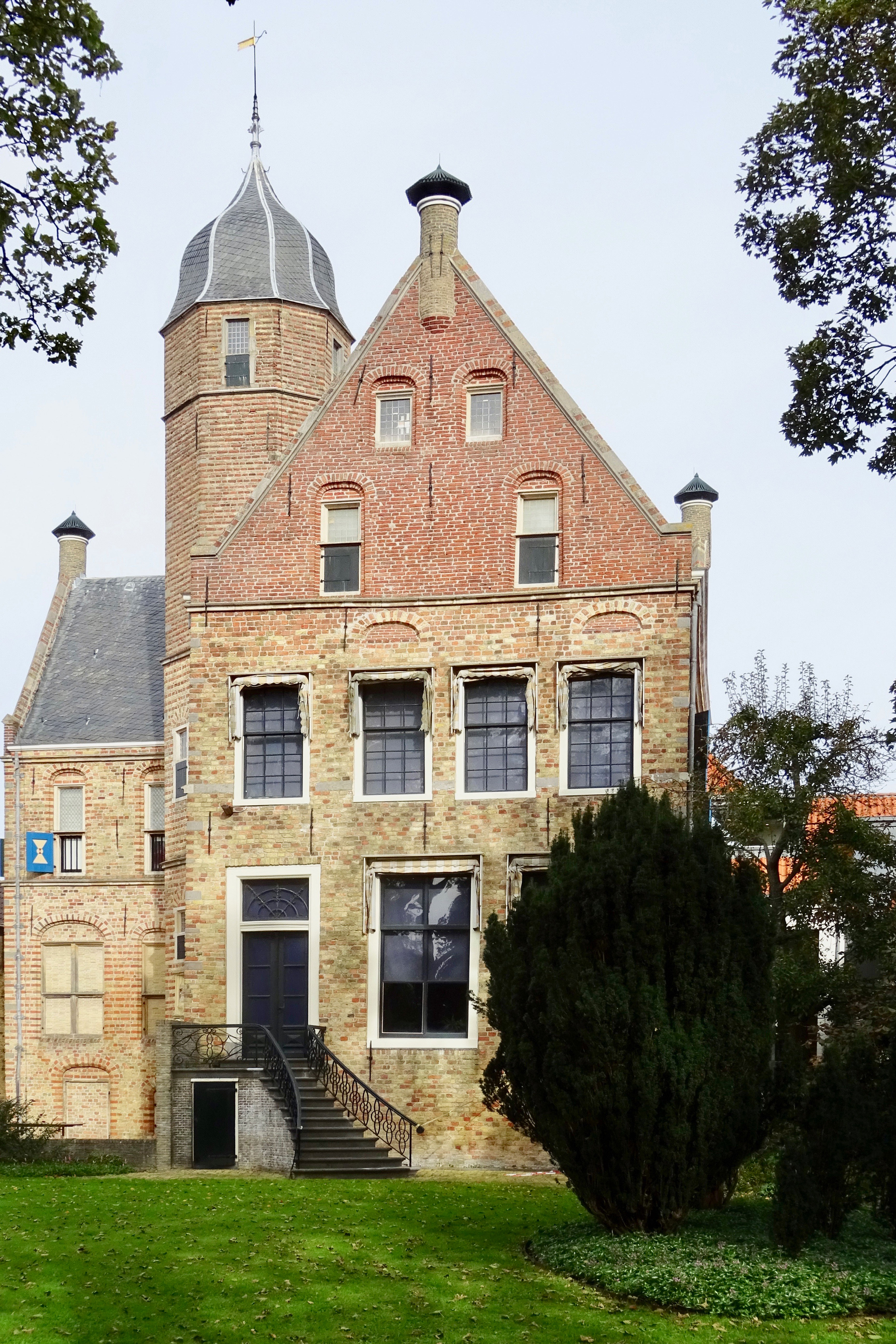
The Martenahuis in Franeker

The Martena family owned additional properties besides their estate in Cornjum. The Martenahuis in Franeker was built in 1506, on the order of Hessel van Martena, and his family lived there until 1686. This building now houses the Museum Martena.
