= Martenahuis =

Stins in Franeker, Netherlands

- Martenahûs
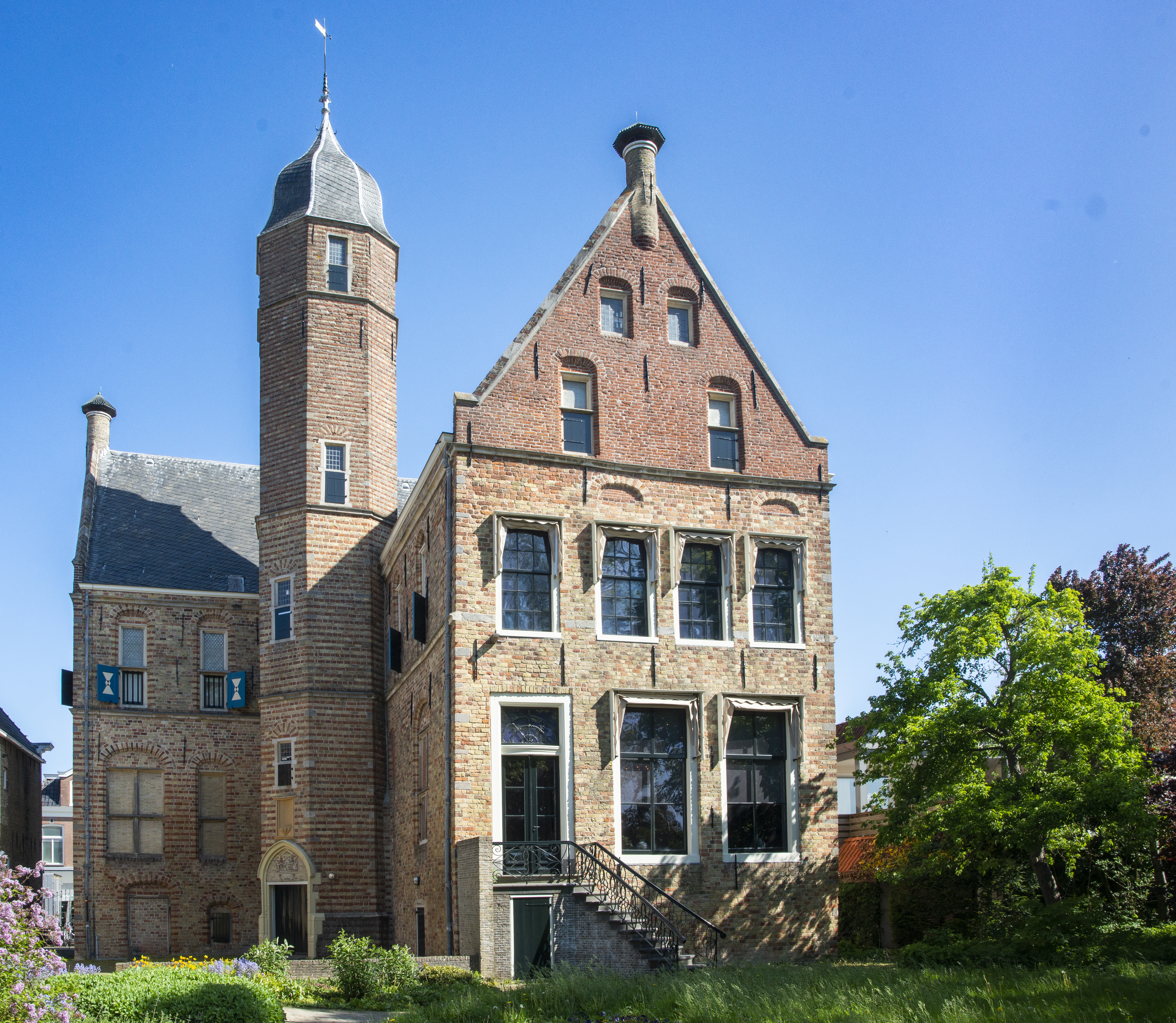
- Martenahuis
- Interactive map of the Martenahuis area
- Alternative names: Martenastins

General information
- Status: Museum
- Type: Stins
- Location: Voorstraat 35, 8801 LA, Franeker, Friesland, Netherlands
- Coordinates: 53°11′11″N 5°32′32″E
- Named for: Hessel van Martena
- Year built: 1502

Design and construction
- Designations: Rijksmonument (nr. 15756)

Website
- www.museummartena.nl

The Martenahuis or Martenastins (West Frisian: Martenahûs) is a stins (estate) in the centre of the Dutch city of Franeker, Friesland. The building is located on the Voorstraat. The Martenahuis dates from 1502 when it was built by order of the chieftain Hessel van Martena. Since 2006, Museum Martena has been housed in the building.

== History ==
The Martenahuis was built in 1502, by order of the Frisian chieftain Hessel van Martena^{(nl)} (±1460–1517), a frontman of the Schieringers, who originally came from Koarnjum, in the municipality of Leeuwarden. Martena had a stins in Bitgum which during the civil war between the Schieringers and the Vetkopers was looted twice by the Vetkopers and the second time it burned to the ground, the defensive wall around it was dug up and leveled. Because Martena was defending the city of Franeker for Albert of Saxony, it was obvious to him to build a new estate there, also because Franeker was firmly in the hands of the Schieringers.

After the death of Martena, in 1517, his widow Both van Hottinga lived in the Martenahuis until 1541, when she died as well. The estate was then inherited by Lucia van Martena, who was married to the German nobleman Frits van Grombach^{(nl)}. In March 1584, when Amelia van Grombach owned the building, twenty houses were leased on the site of the stins for the expansion of Franeker. Through the same owner, who was married to a member of the Vervou family, the Martenahuis became the property of that family.

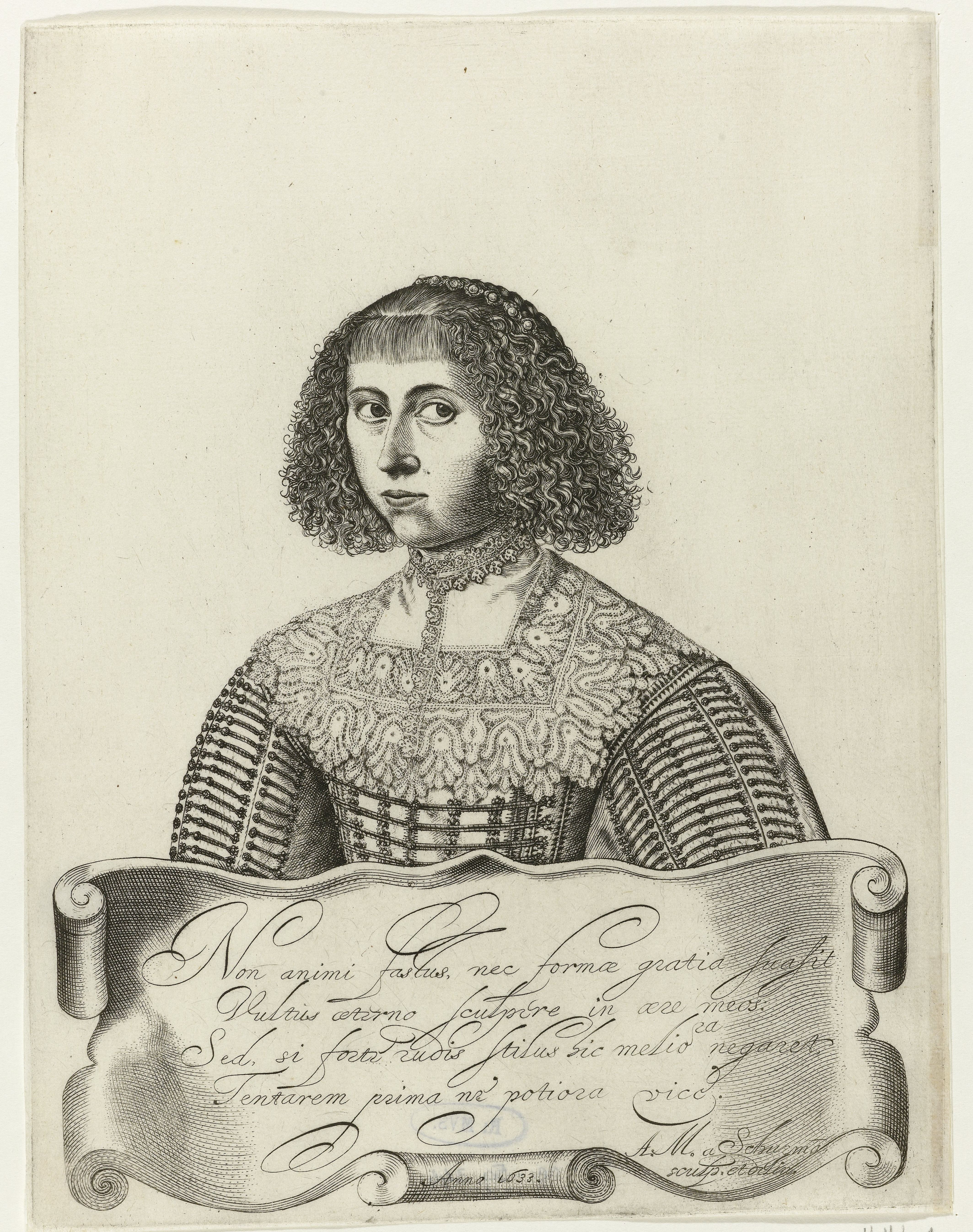
Anna Maria van Schurman, self portrait, 1633

In 1671, the estate was inherited by Abel Coenders van Vervou, who probably never lived there himself. Instead, he rented the building to, among others, priest Campegius Vitringa and the famous scholar Anna Maria van Schurman. In 1694, through a public sale, the Martenahuis came into the possession of a Suffridus Westerhuis, who had the property thoroughly renovated around 1700. After the death of Titia Bogarda, the widow of Westerhuis, the stins came into the possession of another widow, Maria van Ranouw, who passed it on to her daughter Elisabeth, who was married again to dr. Isaäk Telting. He died in 1781, after which the Martenahuis was inherited by Tettsje Scheltema, the widow of Albartus Telting.

In 1826, Tettsje's grandson Albartus Deketh inherited the estate, which he sold to his great-nephew Albartus Telting^{(nl)} for ƒ5.000. In the deed of sale, it is stated that the tenant at the time was Walraven Willem Noodt, while Sjoerd Faber and Koenraad Ysbrandi also lived in the cellars of the property. Albartus Telting died in 1863, after which the Martenahuis remained in the possession of his widow Anna Cornelia Henriëtte Huguenin for another thirty years. In 1895, the property was purchased by the former (old) municipality of Franekeradeel^{(nl)}, which after a restoration in 1971–1972 designated it its town hall. That was a somewhat peculiar situation, with the former Franekeradeel consisting of a northern and a southern part, which lay north and south of the city of Franeker; however, Franeker itself formed the independent municipality of Franeker at the time, and thus the town hall of Franekeradeel was actually outside the municipality itself.

In the municipal reorganization of 1984, the old Franekeradeel, Franeker itself, and most of Barradeel merged into the new municipality of Franekeradeel. That new municipality first kept the Franeker City Hall (the old town hall of the municipality of Franeker) as the town hall and later had a completely new building built west of the city center, on the Harlingerweg. The Martenahuis thus lost its function as a town hall in 1984, but continued to be used as an office building for the municipal organization for several years. When it finally came to be empty, it was decided that Museum 't Coopmanshûs, the city museum of Franeker, would be housed in it, which was looking for more spacious housing. The museum in the Martenahuis opened on 8 July 2006, and because it was previously called 't Coopmanshûs but was no longer established there, a new name had to be given, which became Museum Martena.

== Building ==
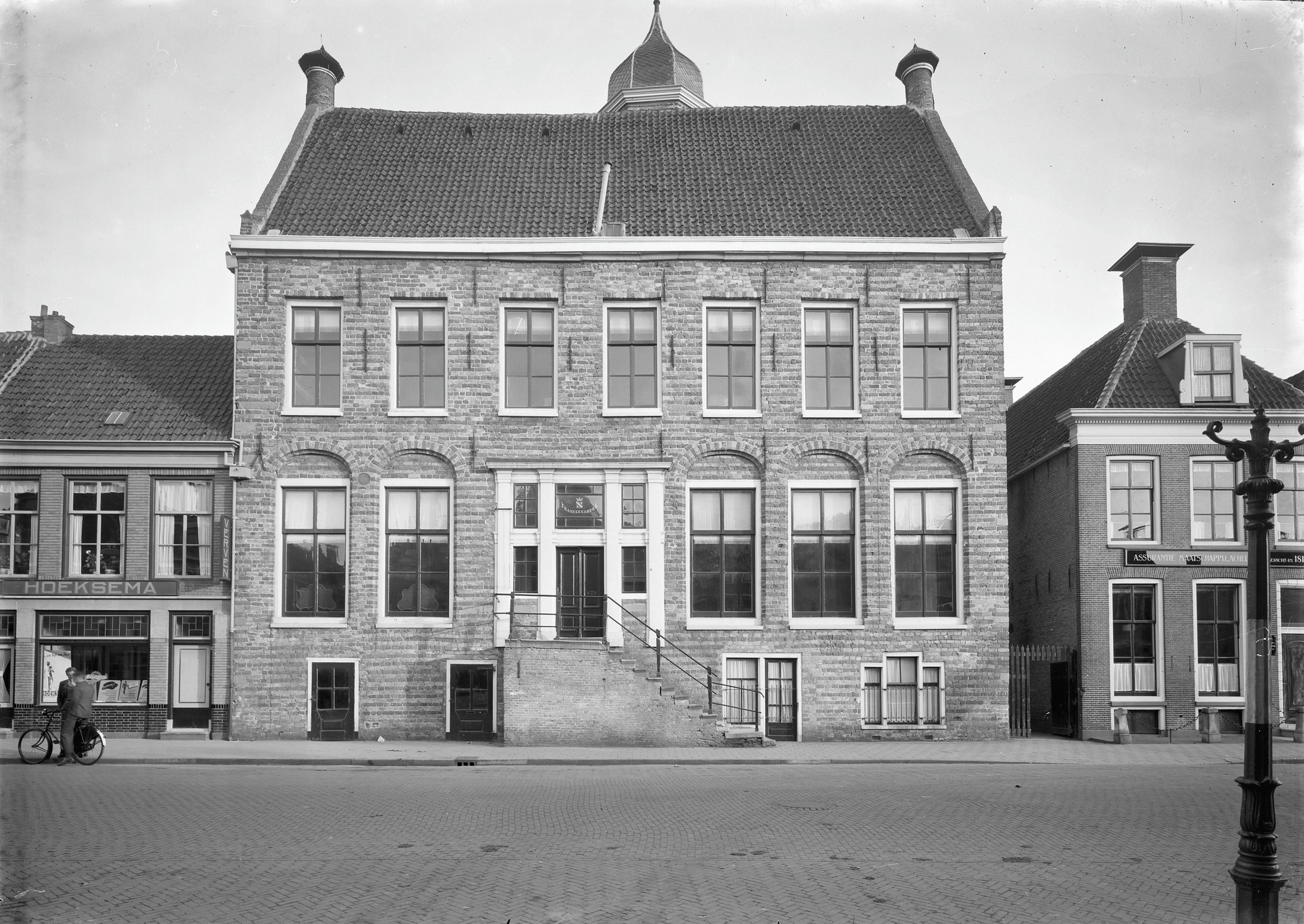
The Martenahuis as it looked before the restoration of 1971–1972

Although the Martenahuis dates from the end of the fifteenth century, today it has a strongly seventeenth-century appearance due to extensive renovations and a 'reconstruction' from the twentieth century. The stins is built of old kloostermoppen, and consists alternately of red and yellow bricks. It is made up of two wings that are perpendicular to each other at an angle of 90°. The present front, which stands in an east–west direction on the south side of Voorstraat, forms one wing, and the other runs from the eastern end of that first wing straight to the south. A small tower with a staircase and viewing area at the top has been added in the corner between the two wings.

The windows of the Martenahuis originally consisted of natural stone cross windows with stained glass in them, while the original main entrance was in the tower, at what is now the rear of the building. This entrance and the square that lay in front of it could be reached through a gate building with an upper house that used to stand on the east side next to the stone wall. This situation can still be seen on a map of Franeker from 1616. On the side of Voorstraat, there was originally one large hall along the entire length of the house. From the inside, the stins was made up of bents, stands with Gothic keystones and corbels. The cellars are vaulted on pillars.

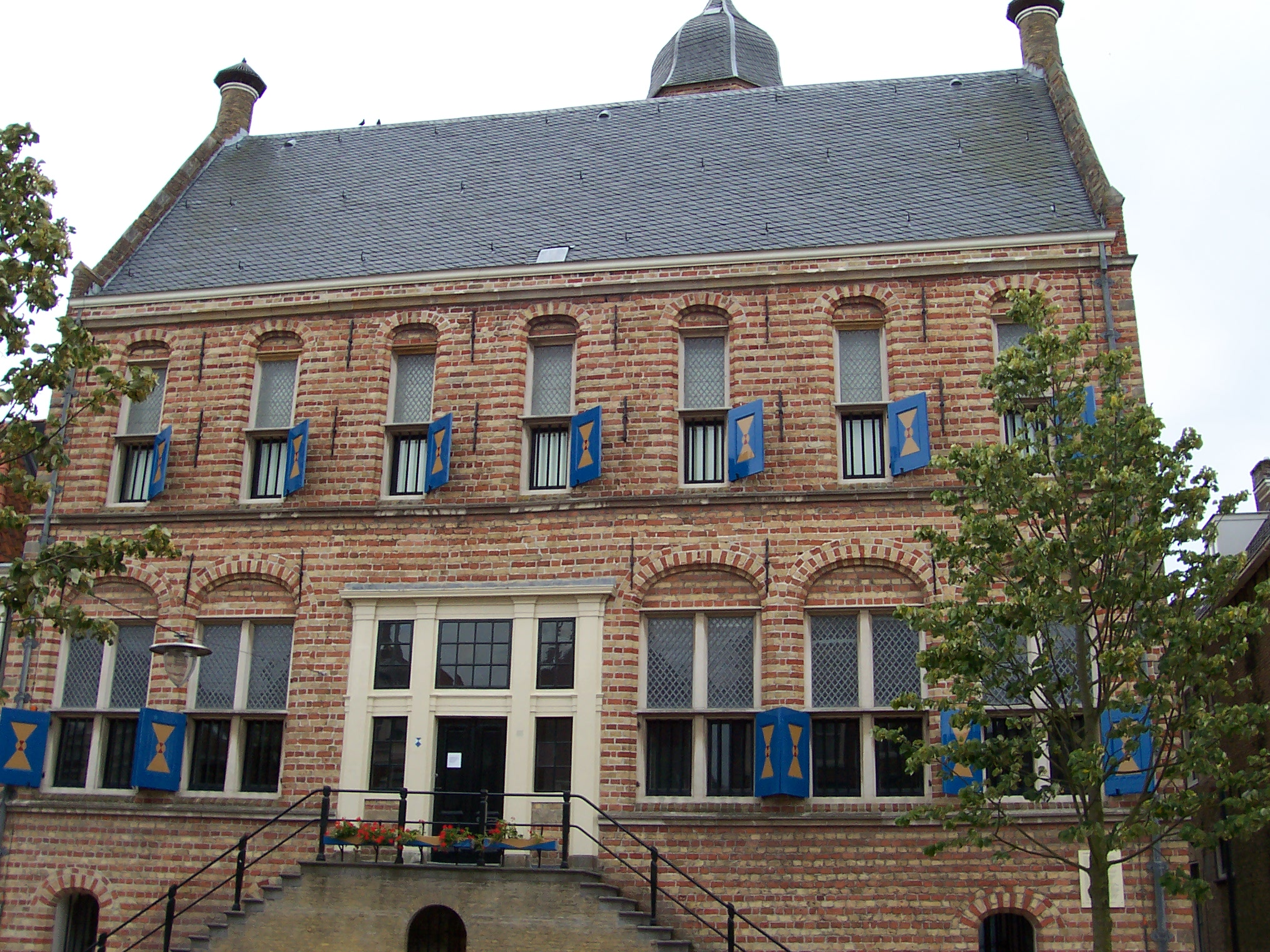
The Martenahuis as it looks since the restoration of 1971–1972

During the thorough renovation of 1700 by order of the then owner Suffridus Westerhuis, a new main entrance was made on the Voorstraat, at the front of the stins, with one-sided stairs (from the west) to a platform in front of the door. Behind the new door was a hall with a corridor in its extension. As a result, a room with three windows wide was created on the right of the corridor, which retained the original depth of the hall. The room attic consisting of beams with boards over it was removed from the face by a coffered ceiling with painted surfaces. Later, painted canvases appeared on the walls. To the left of the corridor, a second room was created, two windows wide, where the attic remained as it was. However, this room was made narrower because a kitchen was then added. Also, the two windows of the left room were probably modified during the renovation of 1700 and fitted with shutters.

Also in the nineteenth century, several renovations were made to the Martenahuis; so were, for instance, the windows stripped of the original stained glass and equipped with so-called empire windows. In the twentieth century, during the restoration of 1971–1972, the stone cross windows were returned to their original form, including blue-painted blinds on the outside of the building. In the right room, however, the hatches that belonged to the empire windows were kept. The new main entrance at the front of the building from 1700 was also maintained for practical reasons. However, the platform was now also provided with stairs on the east side.

== Museum Martena ==
Museum Martena has been housed in the Martenahuis since 2006. The museum contains the historical collection of the city of Franeker, the collection of the former University of Franeker, and also has the largest collection of and about the scientist Anna Maria van Schurman. She was the first unofficial female university student in the Netherlands. In her early youth, she lived with her family in the Martenahuis.

The museum houses one of the few preserved xylotheques in the Netherlands. With 158 volumes, it is the largest in the Netherlands. The museum furthermore frequently organises exhibitions of modern art by local Frisian artists. It is also known for its so-called Aaitour, a special tour through the museum for people with a visual impairment.

=== Collection ===
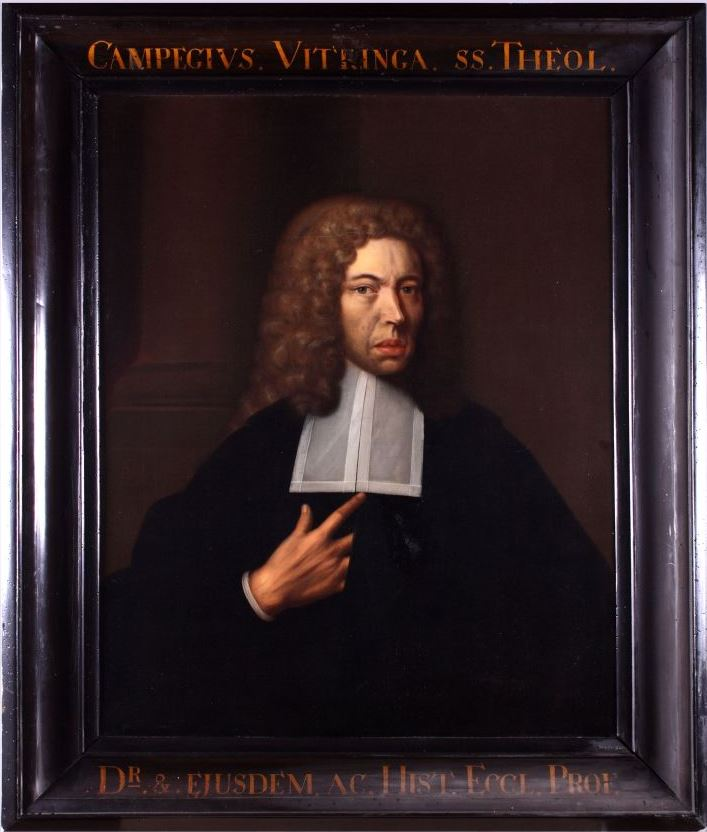
Campegius Vitringa (18th century), by Bernardus Accama

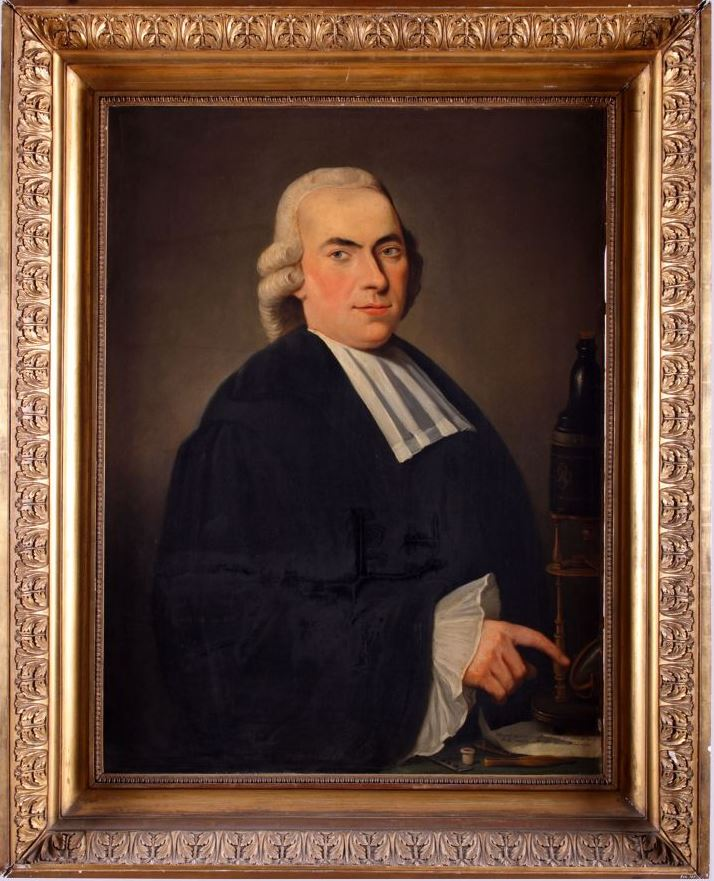
Anton Brugmans (1760s), unknown painter

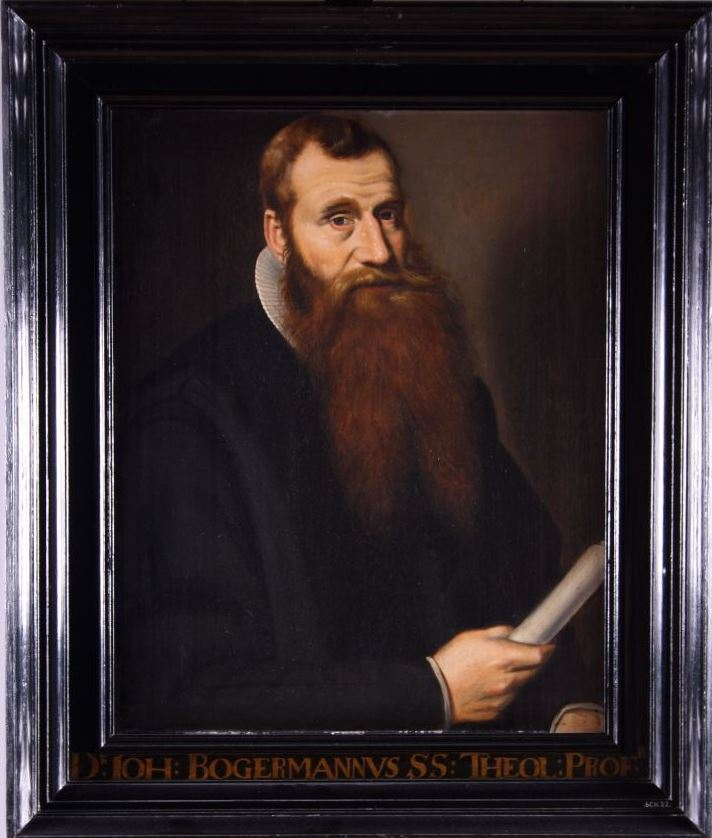
Johannes Bogerman (17th century), unknown painter

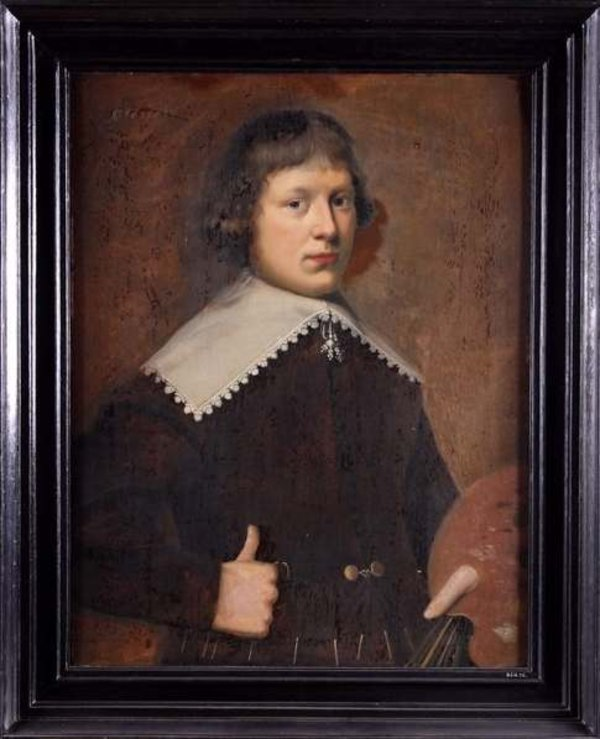
Jan Jansz. de Stomme (1635), self portrait

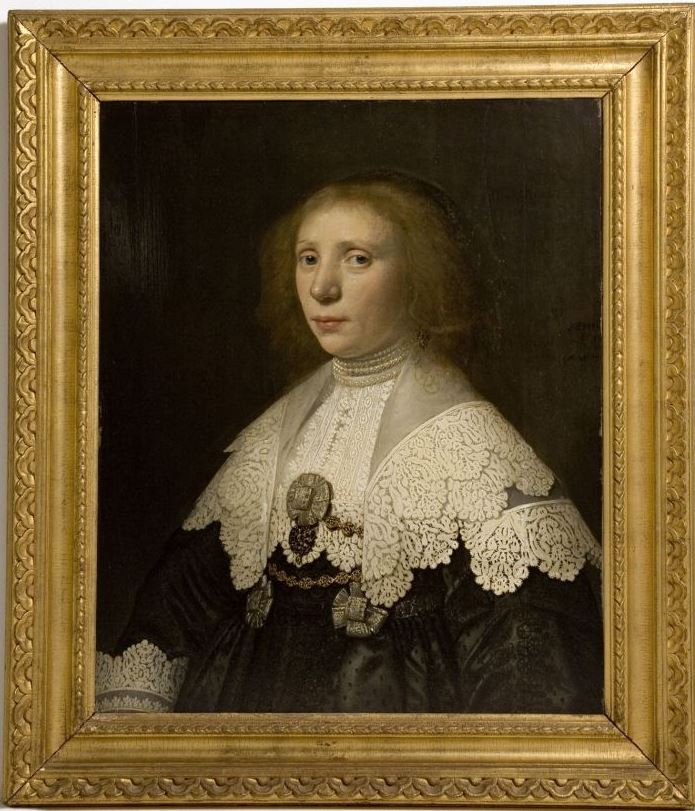
Anna Maria van Schurman (17th century), by Michiel Jansz. van Mierevelt

== Martenatuin ==
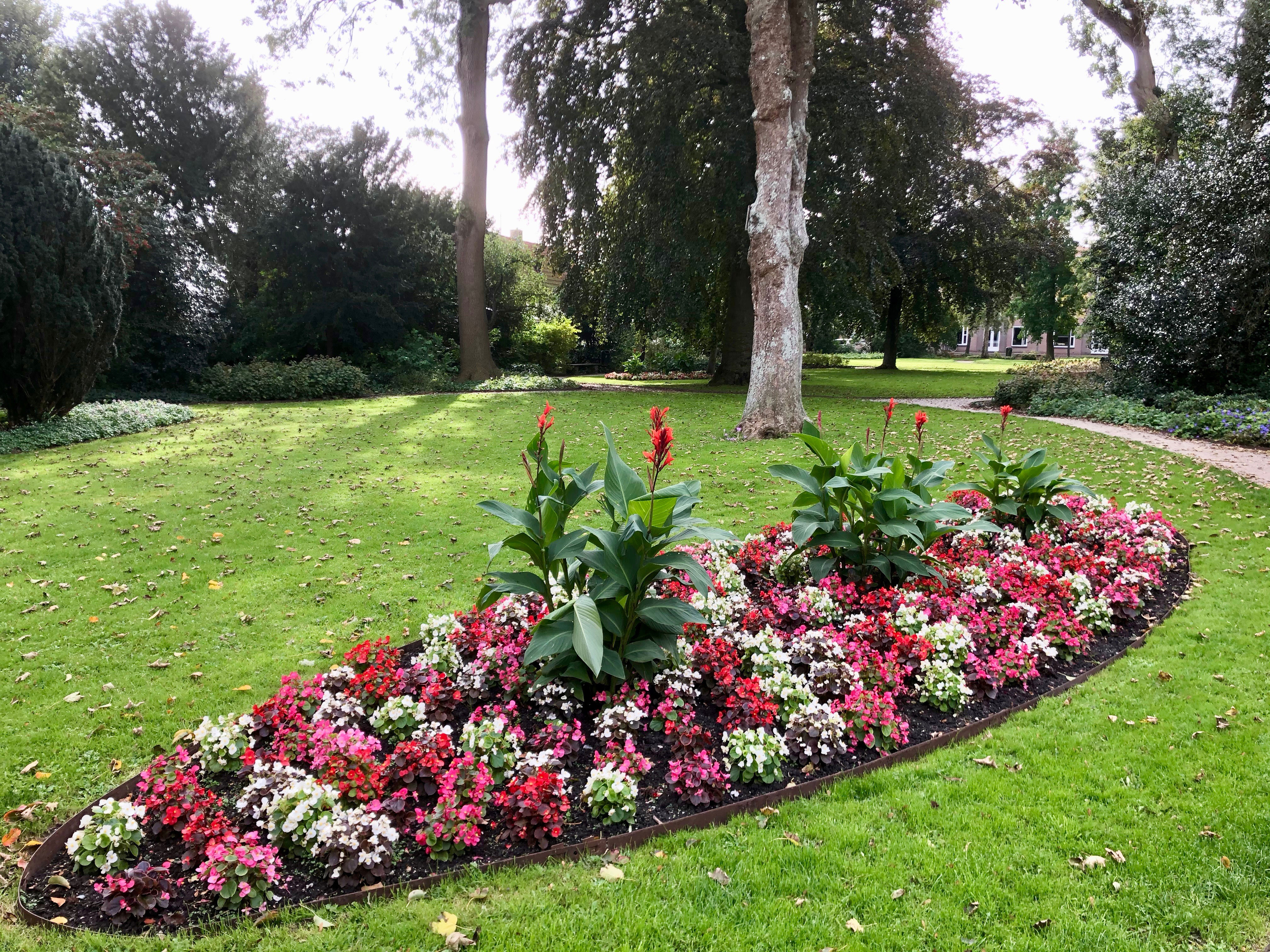
Martenatuin

The Martenatuin is the adjoining garden behind the Martenahuis, where a lot of so-called stins plants grow, and which, in terms of size, is almost like a small park. This garden, which now starts immediately behind the stins, in the place where the square in front of the main entrance to the tower was originally located, was designed in 1694 by order of Suffridus Westerhuis in the style of the French landscape architect André Le Nôtre. So a pleasure park was created with parterres, mirror hedges, and an orangery. In 1834, by order of Albartus Telting, the Martenatuin was presumably redecorated by the Leeuwarden landscape architect Lucas Pieters Roodbaard. Today, the Martenatuin, just like the stins, is used by Museum Martena, which has turned it into a sculpture garden.

== See also ==
- List of stins in Friesland
