= Sjaerdemaslot =

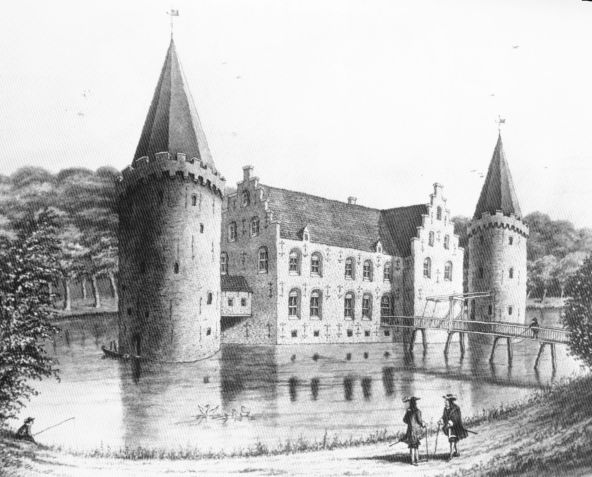
Sjaerdemaslot

The Sjaerdemaslot was a Frisian castle, a so-called "state", in Franeker, the Netherlands. In 1446 the construction of the castle was started and the state was demolished in 1727. Famous residents include the philosopher René Descartes and Duke Albert of Saxony.

== The structure ==
The moated castle was built into the main canal of the Frisian city Franeker and turned into a citadel. When the moat was completed, the state was only accessible by a bridge. It had two storeys above a basement. Besides the main building it had two wings and a large round tower. A smaller tower was on the west side of the final.

== History ==
The first inhabitants were Douwe Aylva and Edwert Sjaerdema. Later it was ceded to duke Albert of Saxony. Eventually the family got the state back after Albert of Saxony had lived there for several years. Later the castle belonged to Carel van Sternsee who was married to Cammingha Luts. Then Ruurd van Juckema inherited the castle. In the summer of 1629 he rented it to French philosopher René Descartes. The latter came to Franeker because of the local university. The castle was passed from father to son and eventually to Eduarda Lucia Juckema who was married to Martena Duca. The grandson of this couple later sold the state in 1725, only to be demolished that same year.

== Literature ==
- Elward, Ronald; Karstkarel, G. Peter (1990). Stinsen en states. Adellijk wonen in Friesland (in Dutch). Drachten, Leeuwarden: Friese Pers Boekerij. ISBN 90-330-0234-5. OCLC 476966746.
