= Franeker =

Franeker Frjentsjer (West Frisian)
- City
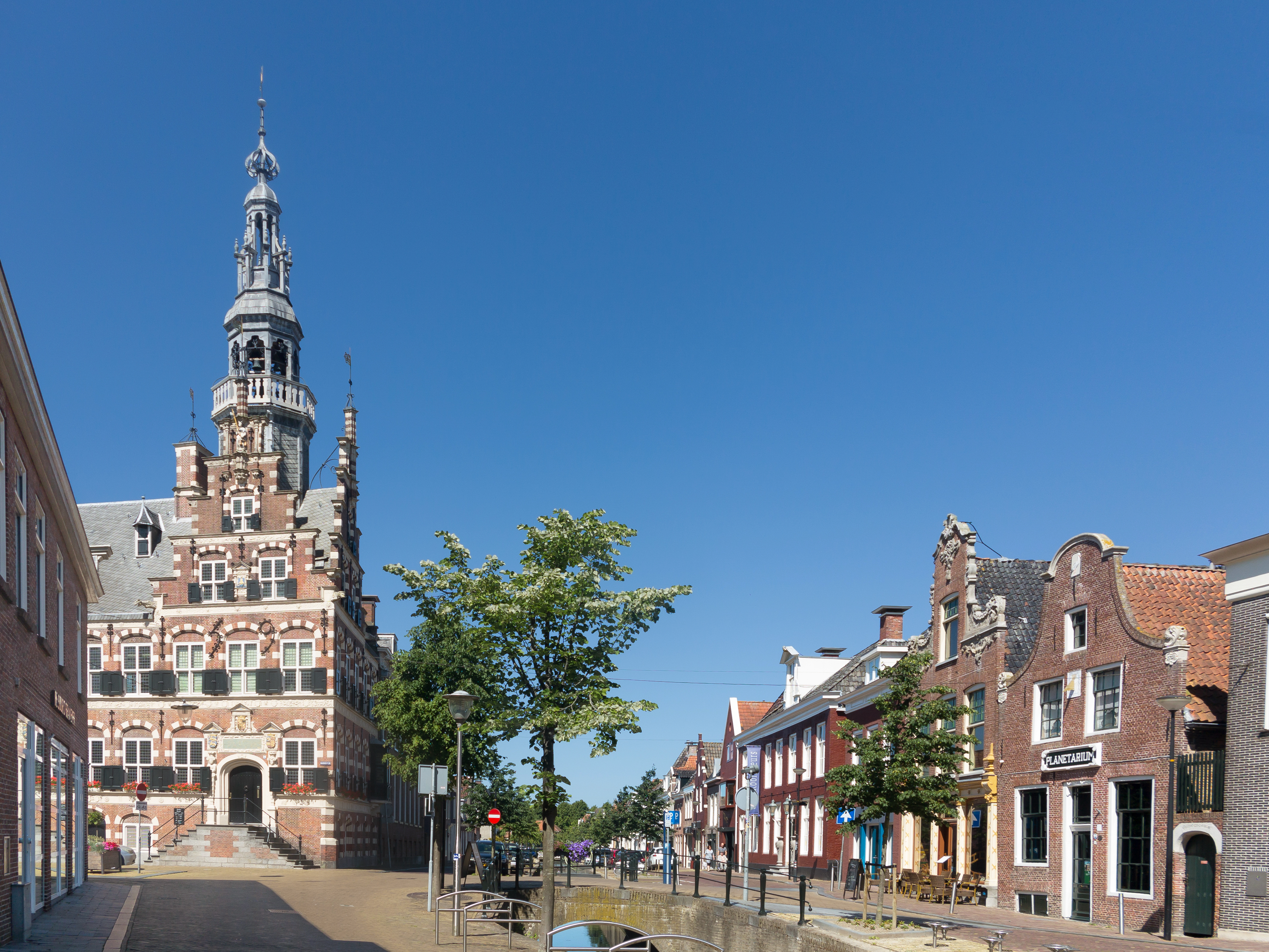
- The former city hall (left) and the Eise Eisinga Planetarium (right)

- Flag Coat of arms
- Motto(s): Ster van de Elfsteden (Dutch) (Star of the Eleven Cities)
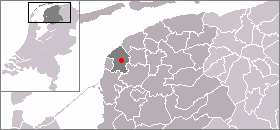
- Location in the former municipality of Franekeradeel in Friesland in the Netherlands

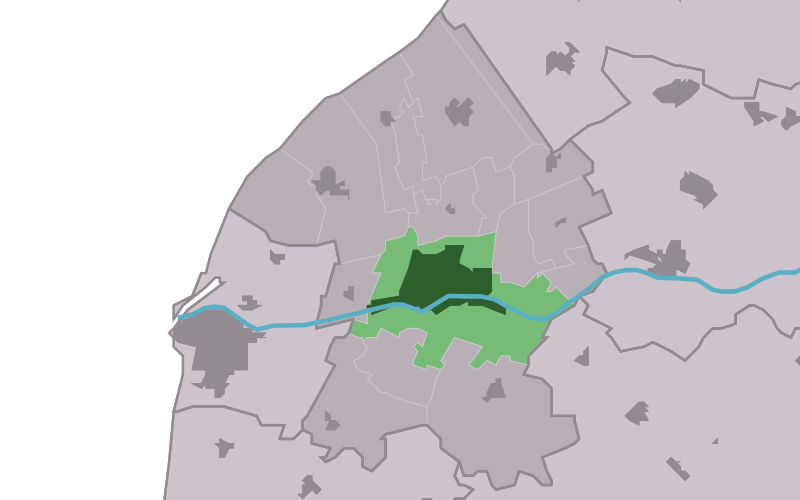
- Location in the former municipality of Franekeradeel

- Location within the Netherlands Location within Europe Franeker (Europe)
- Coordinates: 53°11′N 5°32′E
- Country: Netherlands
- Province: Friesland
- Municipality: Waadhoeke

Area
  - Total: 18.17 km^{2} (7.02 sq mi)
  - Land: 17.42 km^{2} (6.73 sq mi)
  - Water: 0.75 km^{2} (0.29 sq mi)
- Elevation: 1.1 m (3.6 ft)

Population (2021)
  - Total: 13,015
  - Density: 747.1/km^{2} (1,935/sq mi)
- Time zone: UTC+1 (CET)
  - Summer (DST): UTC+2 (CEST)
- Postal code: 8801, 8802
- Dialing code: 0517
- Website: www.franeker.frl

Franeker (Dutch pronunciation: [ˈfraːnəkər]; West Frisian: Frjentsjer [ˈfrjɛntsjər]) is one of the eleven historical cities of Friesland and capital of the municipality of Waadhoeke. It is located north of the Van Harinxmakanaal and about 20 km (12 mi) west of Leeuwarden. As of 2023, it had 13,015 inhabitants. World Heritage Site the Eise Eisinga Planetarium, established in 1781, is located in the city.

== History ==
=== Early history ===
Franeker was founded around 800 as a Carolingian stronghold. The name probably derives from Froon-acker, meaning 'land of the lord/king'; the oldest street in the city is still called Froonacker. Beginning around the 11th century, Franeker developed into the administrative center of northern Westergoa.

Franeker received city rights in 1417, when it was recognised as an independent city and, through the Buurbrief ('Citizen's letter'), formally separated from the grietenij Franekeradeel.

=== Saxon period ===
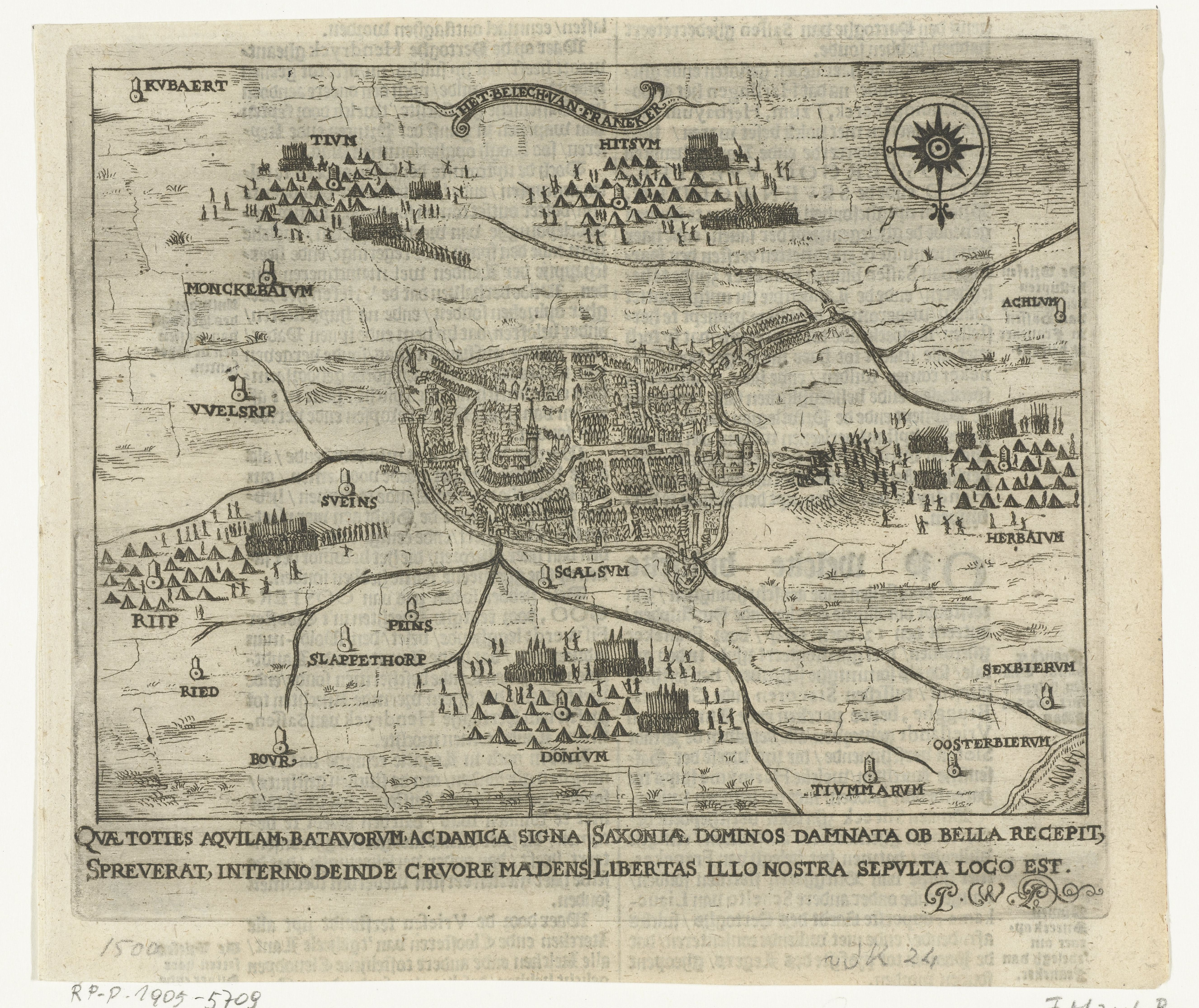
The Siege of Franeker (Pieter Feddes van Harlingen, c. 1620)

At the end of the 15th century, Albert, Duke of Saxony established himself in Franeker, when he had taken over Friesland with the help of the Schieringers led by Hessel van Martena. On 12 May 1500, the city was besieged by an army of 16,000 dissatisfied Frisians during the Siege of Franeker, as a result of the high rents and taxes levied by Albert and his sons Henry and George of Saxony. Henry established his seat in the city of Franeker. The Frisians achieved nothing with the siege of the city because they were poorly trained and organised. Duke Albert of Saxony hastily assembled a large army to relieve Henry and the city of Franeker. Finally, the Frisians were defeated on 16 July 1500 and the city was relieved. On 26 March 1501, Henry IV of Saxony gave the city of Franeker a considerable (200 morgen) piece of salt marshland outside the dike, called the Franekerlanden. Three years later, Henry handed over the government of Friesland to his brother George.

Franeker seemed to become the capital of Friesland at the end of the 15th century. In 1504, however, the Saxons fled to Leeuwarden. After that, the city remained important to the Saxons for a long time, until Friesland was transferred as a possession to Charles V in 1524.

=== University of Franeker ===
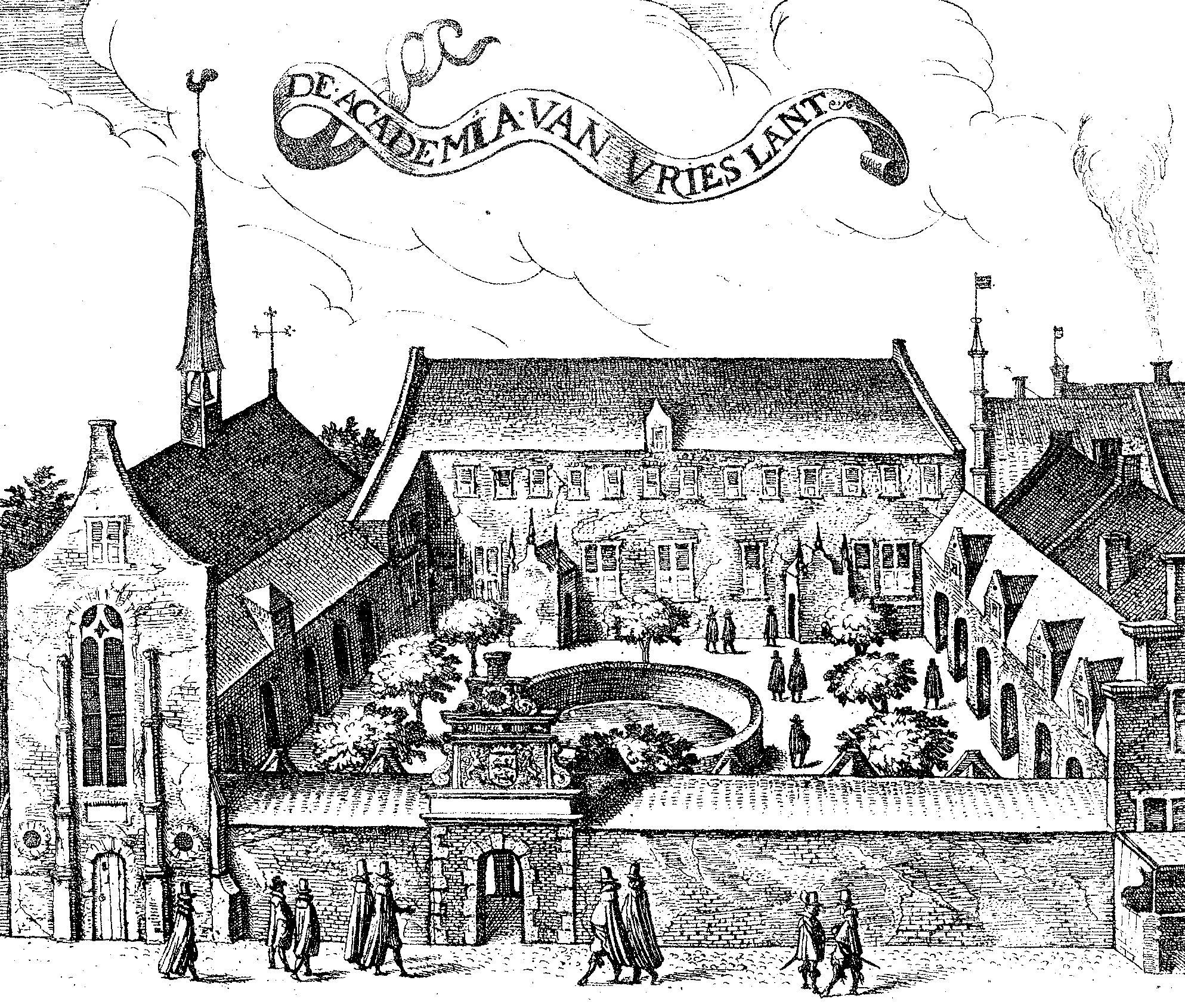
The University of Franeker (Pieter Feddes van Harlingen, 1622)

When the Dutch Republic revolted against the Spanish Empire, Franeker chose the side of William of Orange early on. In 1579, Friesland joined the Union of Utrecht in the joint fight against Spain. In 1580, the States of Friesland decided that only the Reformed doctrine was permitted. In order to meet a growing demand for ministers, lawyers, and doctors, the States decided to found a university.

As such, a Protestant university, the University of Franeker, the oldest in the Netherlands after the University of Leiden, was established on 29 July 1585. The university was housed in the former monastery building of the Crosiers. At this Academy of Friesland, donated by the Frisian stadtholder William Louis, one could study theology, law, medicine, classical languages, philosophy, mathematics, and physics. Some notable students include William IV, Prince of Orange, Peter Stuyvesant, René Descartes, and Eise Eisinga. It was closed shortly after the incorporation of the Kingdom of Holland into the French Empire, when Napoleon Bonaparte closed the academy in 1811. A successor institution, the Rijksatheneum, was founded in 1815, but in 1847 it, too, closed.

=== Recent history ===
In 1984, the municipalities of Franeker and Franekeradeel, as well as part of the municipality of Barradeel, were merged into the new municipality of Franekeradeel.

On 1 January 2018, Franeker became the main town of the newly formed municipality of Waadhoeke. The town hall is located on the Harlingerstraatweg in Franeker.

== Geography ==
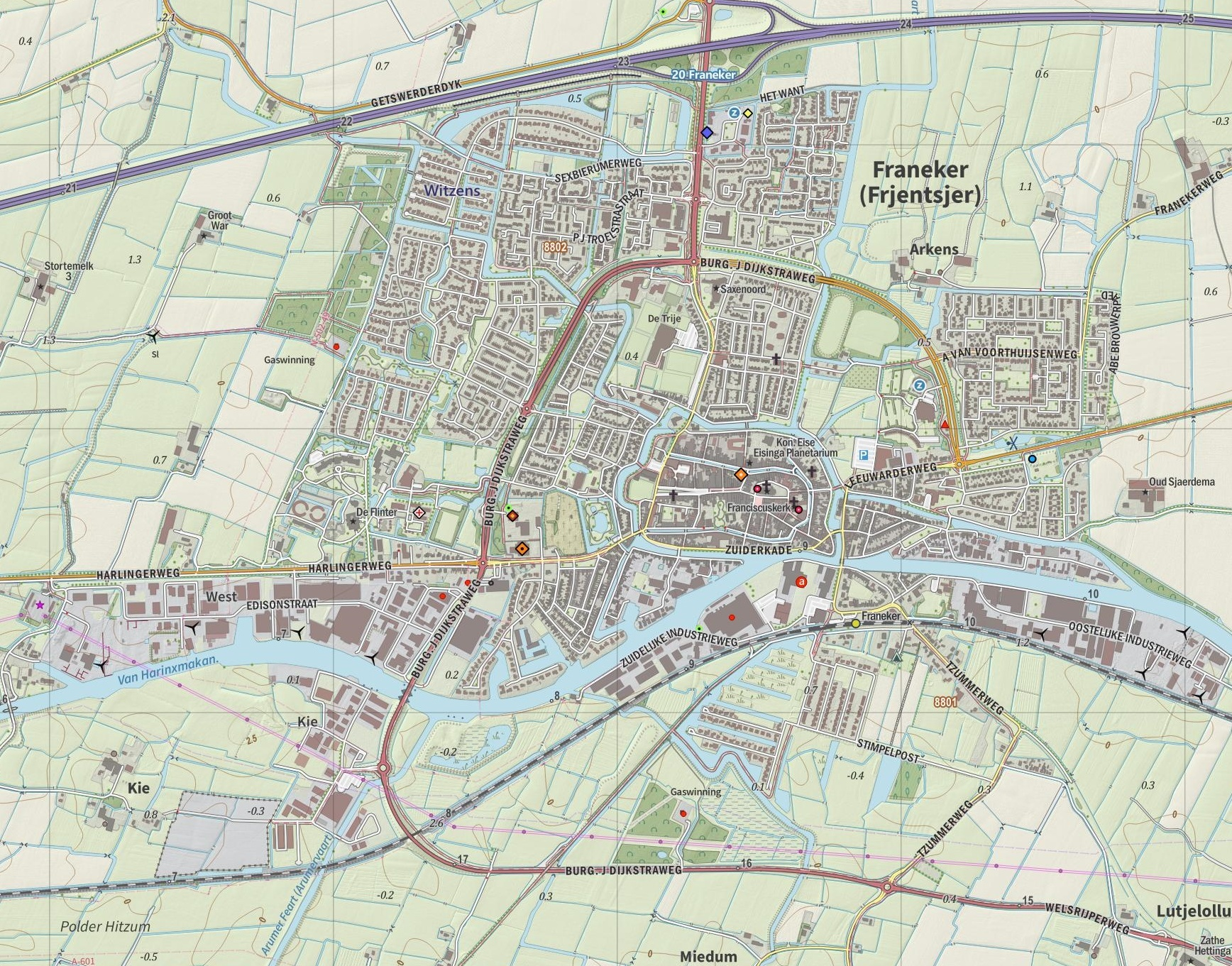
Map of the city of Franeker (2021)

Franeker is located in the municipality of Waadhoeke in the northwest of the province of Friesland in the north of the Netherlands. It is east of the city of Harlingen, north of the Van Harinxmakanaal, south of the Wadden Sea coast, and about 20 km (12 mi) west of the provincial capital Leeuwarden.

== Demographics ==
As of 2023, the city of Franeker had a population of 13,015.

== Culture ==
=== Museums ===
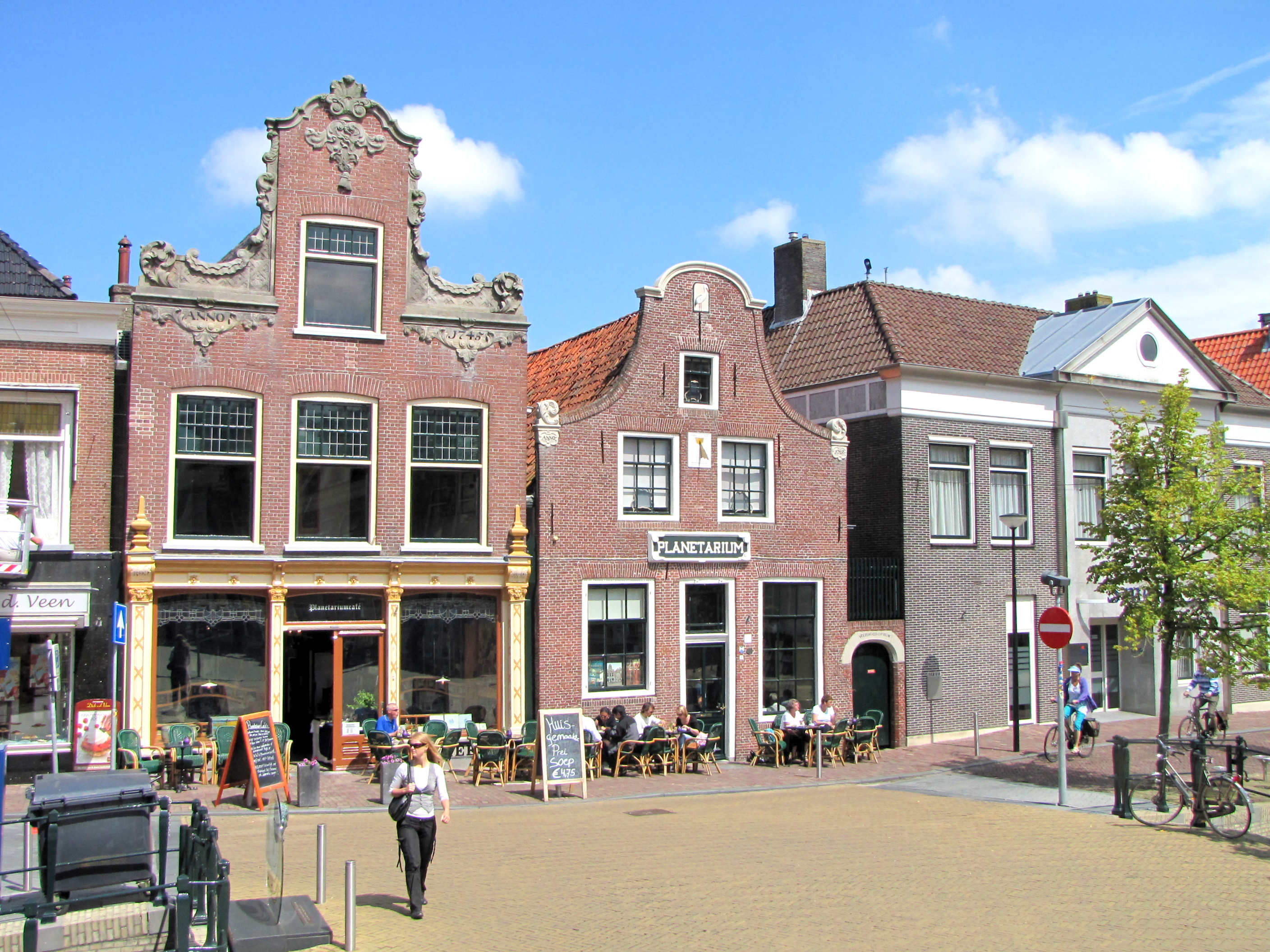
The Eise Eisinga Planetarium (right) and adjacent bar in 2011

The Eise Eisinga Planetarium and the Museum Martena are museums located in the city. The Planetarium is an orrery built between 1774 and 1781 by the local wool carder Eise Eisinga to explain a conjunction of the planets and to help mitigate local fears of what would happen during the planets' alignment. Built in Eisinga's own living room, it is the oldest continuously operating orrery in the world. In 2023, the Planetarium was officially designated a UNESCO World Heritage Site.

Museum Martena, opened in 2006, is housed in the Martenahuis. This old stins was built in 1502 by order of Hessel van Martena and was the residence of Campegius Vitringa and Anna Maria van Schurman in the second half of the 17th century. The museum is devoted to the history of the city and the region.

=== Windmill ===
The windmill Arkens is a hollow post mill which has been restored. It originally stood in Arkens and was moved in 1972. It is the only windmill in the Netherlands equipped with Vlinderwieken (English: Butterfly sails).

== Sports ==
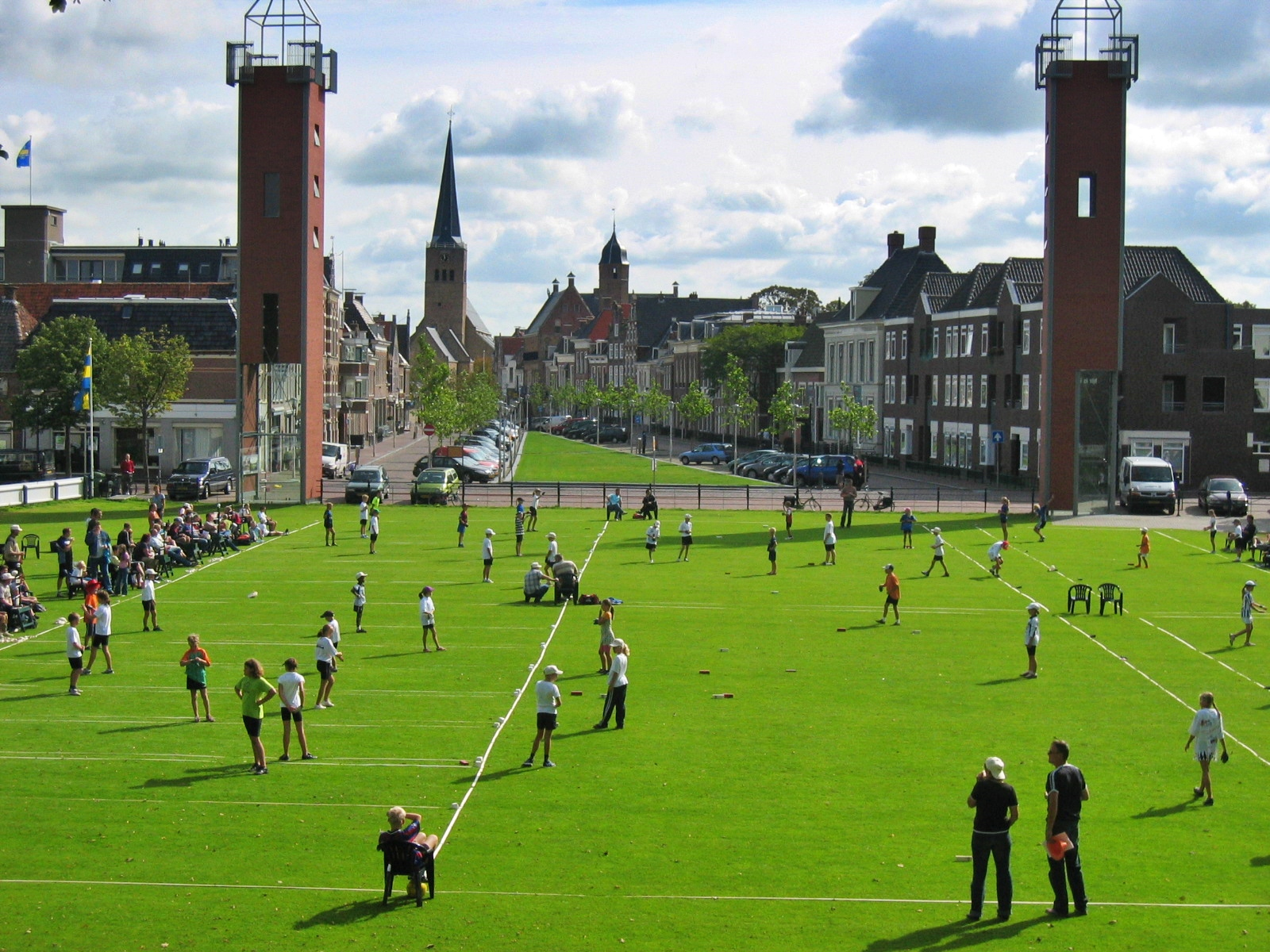
Frisian handball on the Sjûkelân the former location of the Sjaerdemaslot

Since 1852, Franeker has been the home of the PC, the most important tournament in Frisian handball.

Franeker is a regular host of the Frisian draughts competitions.

Being one of the Frisian cities, Franeker is also on the route of the 200 kilometres (120 mi) Elfstedentocht (Eleven-cities Tour), an endurance skating event held at irregular intervals depending on weather conditions.

== Infrastructure ==
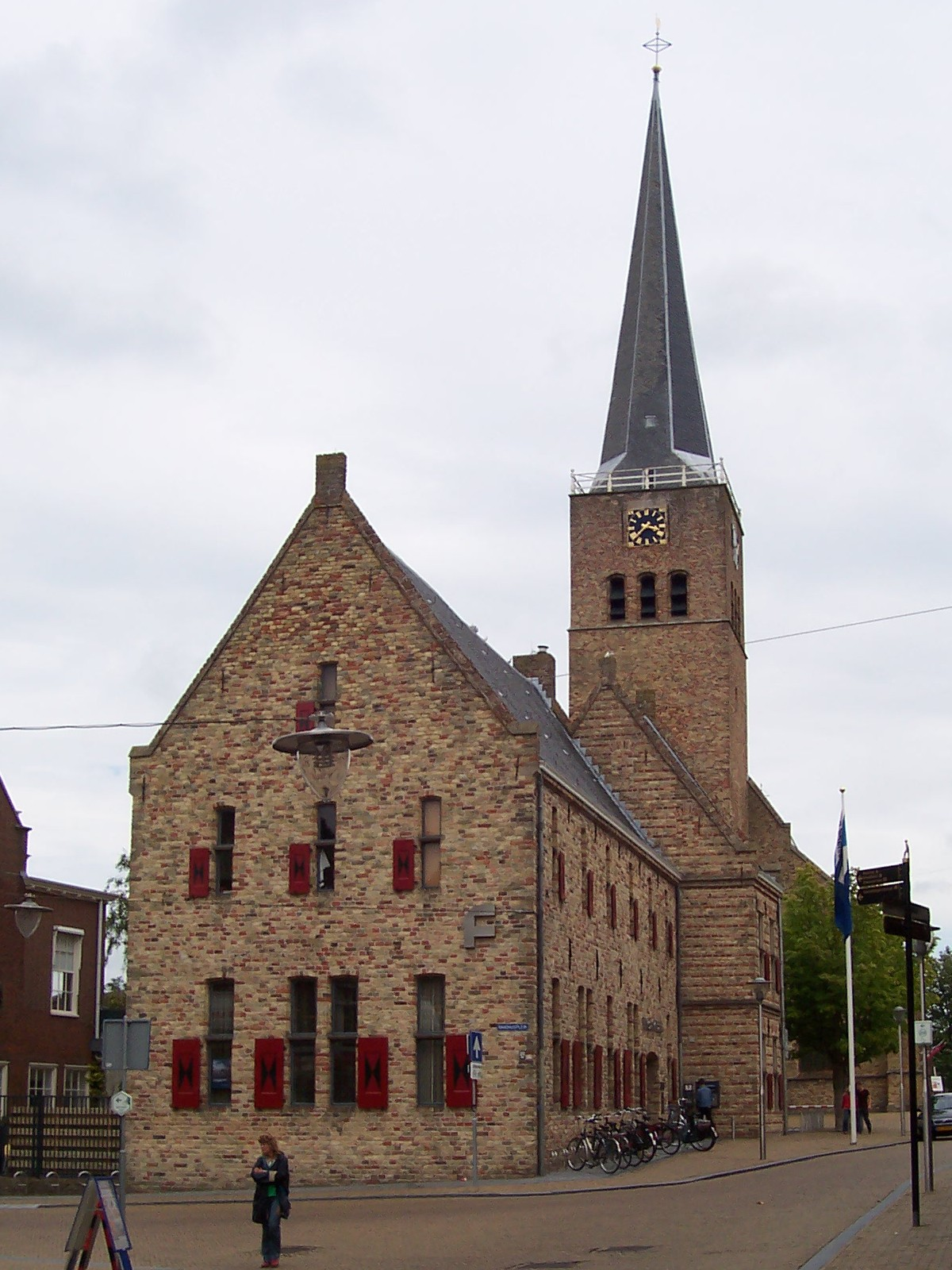
The Camminghahûs (built around 1400) and the Martinichurch

Franeker railway station is a station on the NS line between Leeuwarden and Harlingen. It also had a station on the North Friesland Railway which was the terminus of a branch from Tzummarum. The line opened in October 1903 and closed in October 1933. The station building survives.

== Notable people ==
- Johan Sems (1572–1635), cartographer, engineer and land surveyor
- Anna Maria van Schurman (1607–1678), painter, engraver, poet, classical scholar, philosopher, and feminist
- Ulrik Huber (1636–1694), professor of law at the University of Franeker and political philosopher
- François Hemsterhuis (1721–1790), writer on aesthetics and moral philosophy
- Eise Eisinga (1744–1828), amateur astronomer who built the Eise Eisinga Planetarium in his house
- Sebald Justinus Brugmans (1763–1819), botanist and physician
- Jan Hendrik Oort (1900–1992), astronomer, studied the Milky Way
- Rolf Bremmer (born 1950), scholar of Old Frisian, and Old and Medieval English
- Pia Dijkstra (born 1954), politician and former news presenter
- Dennis Wiersma (born 1986), former politician
