= Campegius Vitringa =

Dutch Protestant theologian and Hebraist

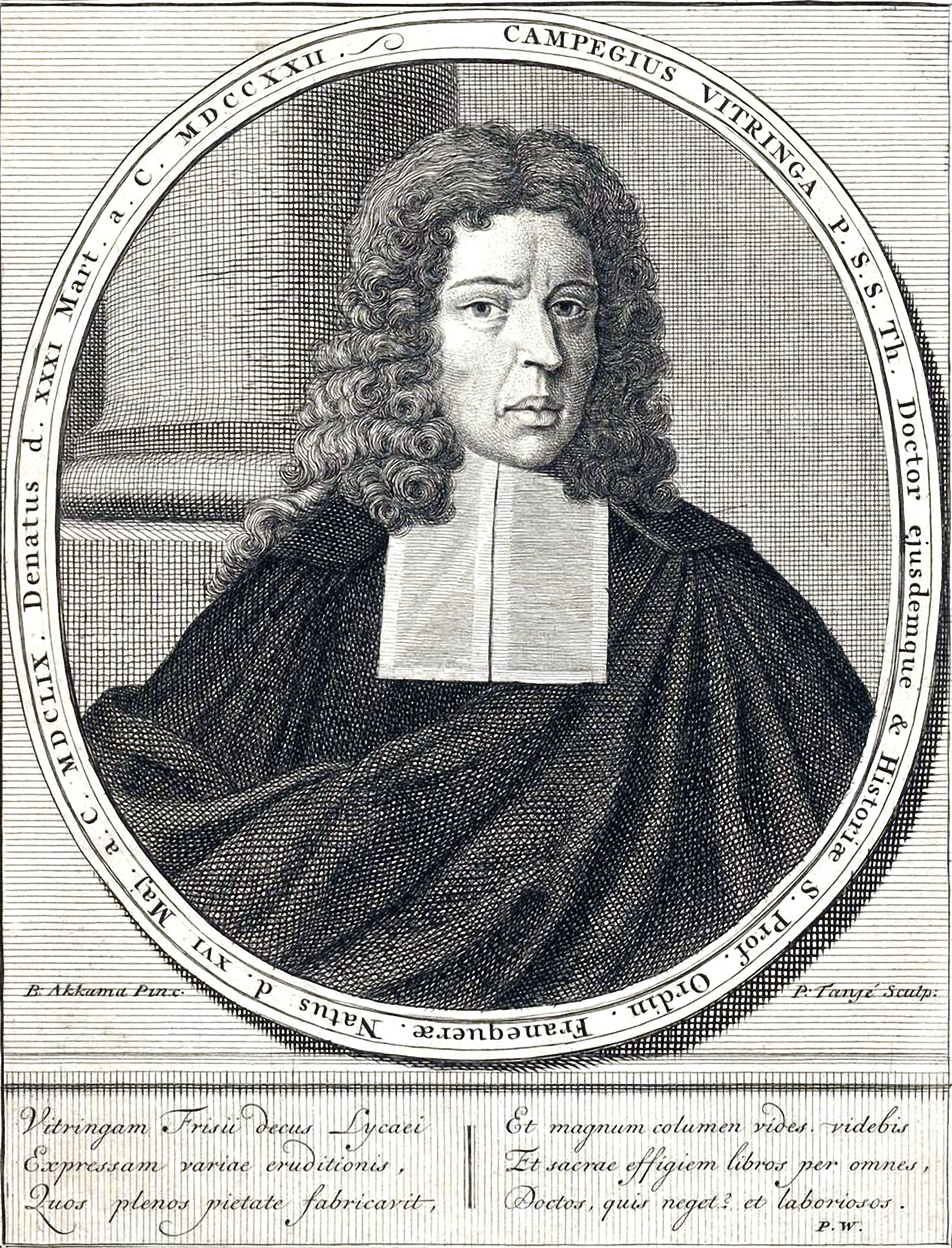
Campegius Vitringa the Elder by Pieter Tanjé

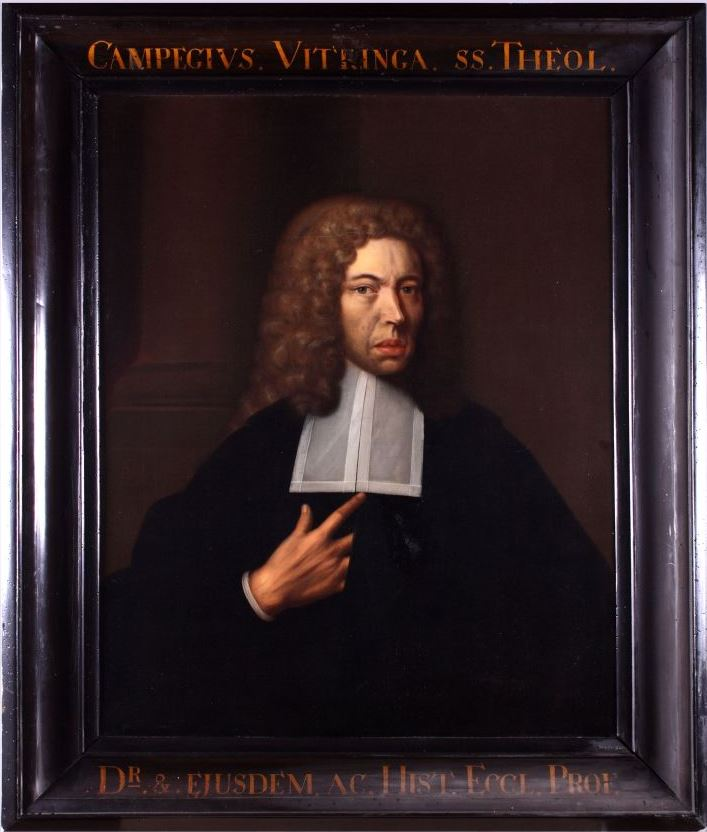
Portrait of Campegius Vitringa by Bernard Accama

Campegius Vitringa Sr., or Kempe Vitringa (May 16, 1659 at Leeuwarden – March 31, 1722 at Franeker) was a Dutch Protestant theologian and Hebraist. His youngest of four children was Campeius Vitringa (1693-1723).

Vitringa, a follower of Johannes Cocceius, was a supporter of prophetic theology. He was educated at the universities of Franeker and Leiden, and became professor of Oriental languages at the former in 1681. When locating prophetic outcomes, he would associate events to the near rather than the far-off future, placing a distinct focus on the period of the Maccabees (2nd Century BC). Like Joseph Mede (1586-1638), Vitringa believed wholeheartedly that the Millennium was yet to come, but did not expect any immediate changes. He relegated the end of the time to a remote future and strongly emphasized the concept of New Jerusalem. His most important student is considered Herman Venema (1697-1787), who was a theology professor at Franeker.

Vitringa’s two chief works are his dissertation on the synagogue, De Synagoga Vetere Libri Tres (Franeker, 1685; 2d ed. 1696); and his Commentary on Isaiah (Leeuwarden, 1714–20), which was frequently republished in the eighteenth century. The latter was up to the time of Gesenius the most considerable contribution to the exegesis of Isaiah. His other works include, Sacrarum Observationum Libri Sex (Franeker, 1683-1708) and Anacrisis Apocalypseos Joannis Apostoli (1705).

== Anacrisis Apocalypseos ==
Vitringa’s most notable work was Anacrisis Apocalypseos Joannis Apostoli (1705), which was considered a major event, in the history of prophetic theology at the turn of the 18th century. He drew extensively on the Clavis Apocalyptica (1627), by Joseph Mede (1586-1638). Vitringa’s work was regarded the first major study to analyze the Book of Revelation as a structured chronological outline of the history of the Christian church. His interpretation of the Apocalypse was that of a coded description of the history of the New Testament Church. Though Vitringa had integrated the historical method of Hugo Grotius in past work, he rejected the view of Grotius and Bossuet that associated John’s visions exclusively to early Christendom.
