= Stins =

Former villa in Friesland, Netherlands

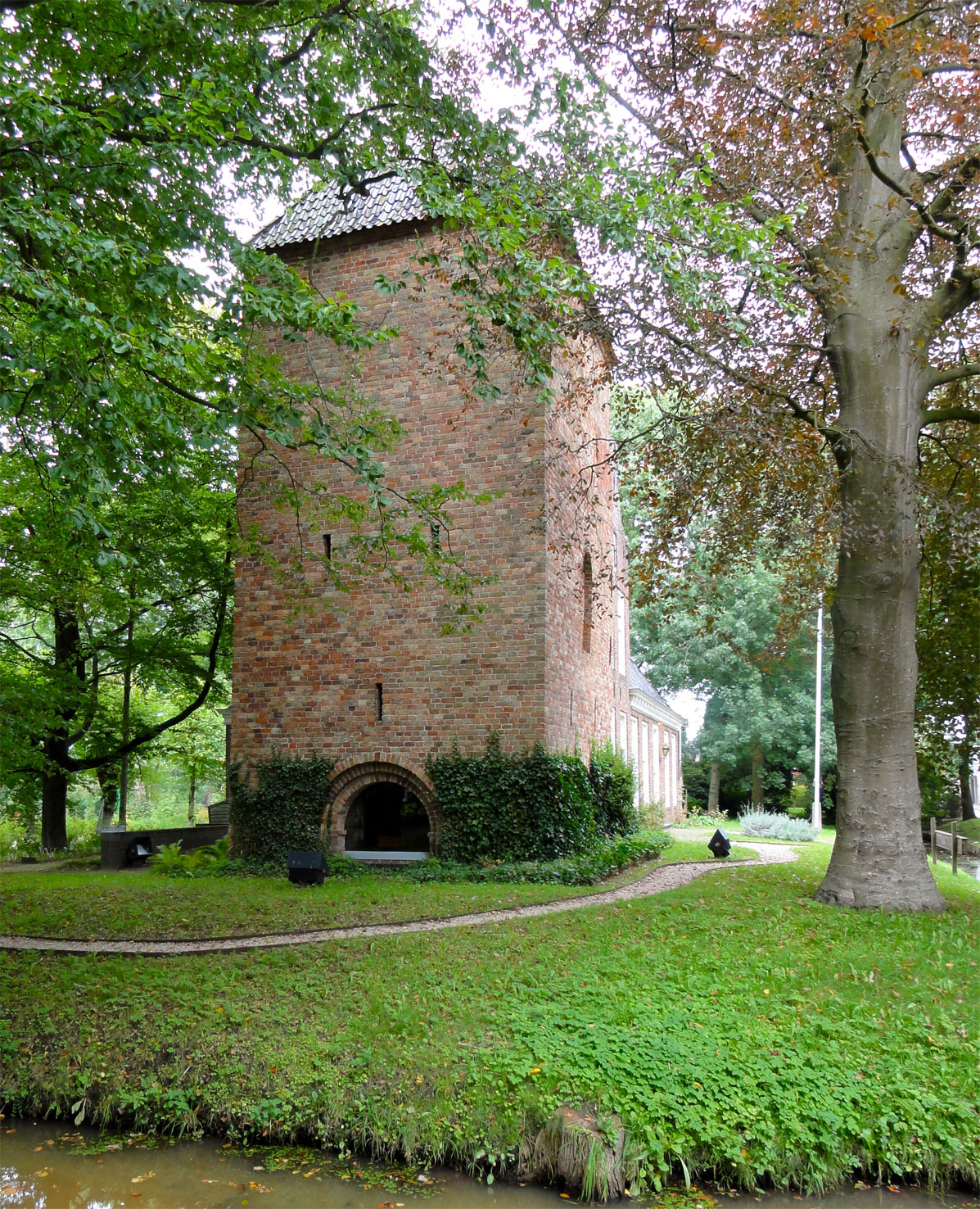
Photo of Skierstins in Feanwalden.

A stins (Dutch, pl. stinsen; from West Frisian stienhûs [Dutch steenhuis] "stone house", shortened to stins, pl. stinzen) is a former stronghold or villa in the province of Friesland, the Netherlands. Many stinsen carry the name "state" (related to English 'estate').

A stins and the surrounding state used to belong to a permanent group of hoofdelingen/heerschappen, which were prominent, rich land-owning citizens. From the 1300s, these noblemen had their bases of power in the cities or large villages, their families owned a few hundred hectares of fertile farmland divided over several dozen tenanted farms. The noblemen married one another as much as possible, on a material and culturally equal level, in order to prevent the loss of property and honour by inheritance.

Around 1498, when the period of Frisian Freedom drew to a close, the system of "stins en state" was superseded by the grietman/grietenij system. From about 1498 until 1851, there were a total of 30 grietenijen in Friesland and 11 cities. Most stinsen were demolished in the mid-1800's, when maintenance became too expensive. Several surviving stinsen are now used as museums.

Stinsen also appear in East Frisia, and are known as borg (pl. borgen) in the province of Groningen.

== See also ==
- List of stins in Friesland
- List of castles in the Netherlands
