= 1536 =

1536 in various calendars
- Gregorian calendar: 1536; MDXXXVI
- Ab urbe condita: 2289
- Armenian calendar: 985; ԹՎ ՋՁԵ
- Assyrian calendar: 6286
- Balinese saka calendar: 1457–1458
- Bengali calendar: 942–943
- Berber calendar: 2486
- English Regnal year: 27 Hen. 8 – 28 Hen. 8
- Buddhist calendar: 2080
- Burmese calendar: 898
- Byzantine calendar: 7044–7045
- Chinese calendar: 乙未年 (Wood Goat); 4233 or 4026 — to — 丙申年 (Fire Monkey); 4234 or 4027
- Coptic calendar: 1252–1253
- Discordian calendar: 2702
- Ethiopian calendar: 1528–1529
- Hebrew calendar: 5296–5297
- Hindu calendars
- Vikram Samvat: 1592–1593
- Shaka Samvat: 1457–1458
- Kali Yuga: 4636–4637
- Holocene calendar: 11536
- Igbo calendar: 536–537
- Iranian calendar: 914–915
- Islamic calendar: 942–943
- Japanese calendar: Tenbun 5 (天文５年)
- Javanese calendar: 1454–1455
- Julian calendar: 1536; MDXXXVI
- Korean calendar: 3869
- Minguo calendar: 376 before ROC 民前376年
- Nanakshahi calendar: 68
- Thai solar calendar: 2078–2079
- Tibetan calendar: ཤིང་མོ་ལུག་ལོ་ (female Wood-Sheep); 1662 or 1281 or 509 — to — མེ་ཕོ་སྤྲེ་ལོ་ (male Fire-Monkey); 1663 or 1282 or 510

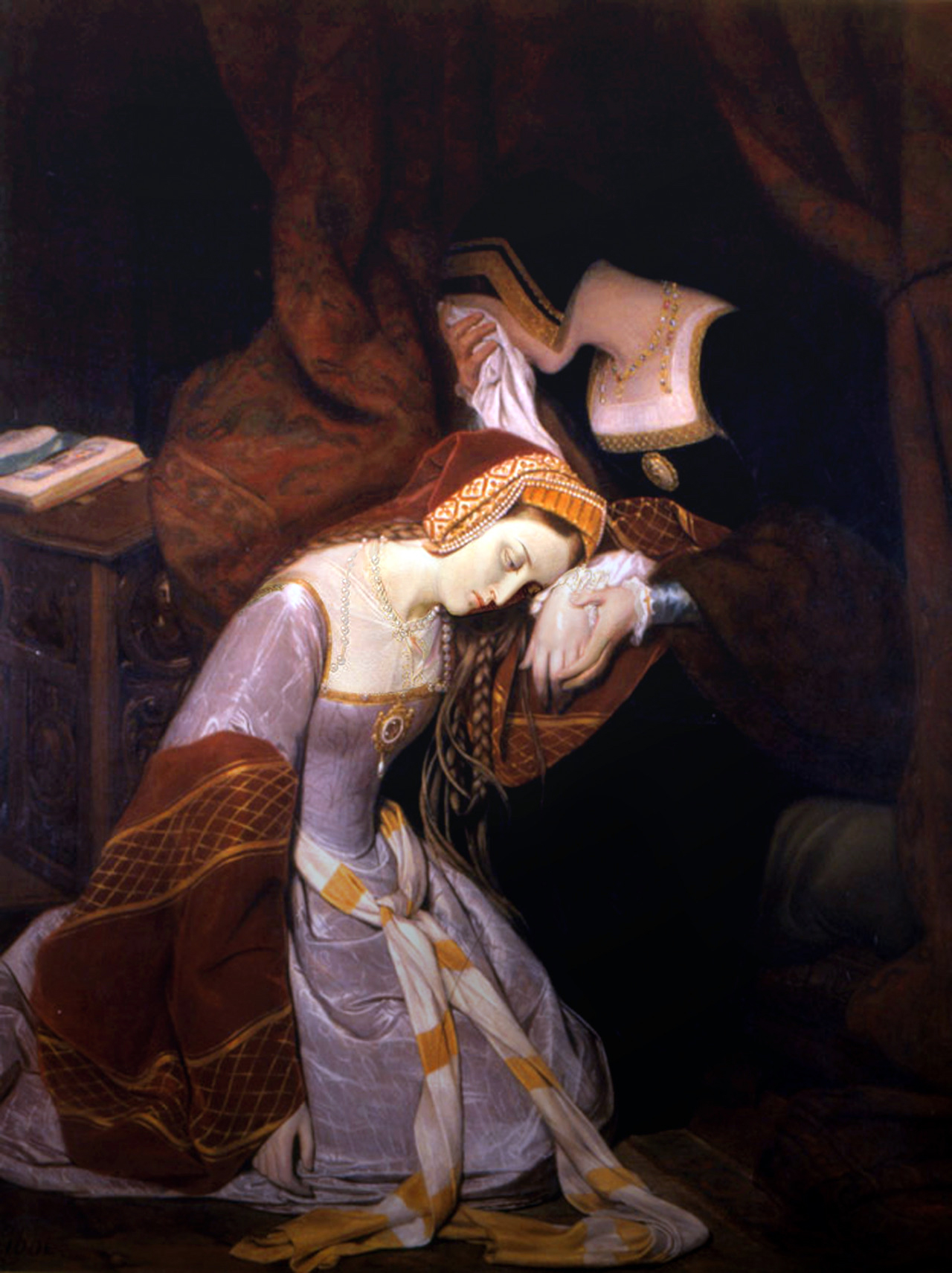
May 19: Anne Boleyn, the Queen consort of England, is beheaded on the orders of her husband, King Henry VIII.

Year 1536 (MDXXXVI) was a leap year starting on Saturday of the Julian calendar.

== Events ==
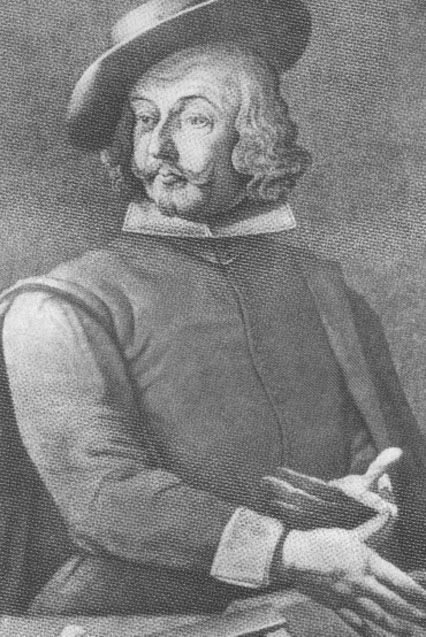
February 25: William Tyndale is burned at the stake.

=== January–March ===
- January 6 – The Colegio de Santa Cruz de Tlatelolco, the oldest European school of higher learning in the Americas, is established by Franciscans in Mexico City.
- January 22 – John of Leiden, Bernhard Knipperdolling and Bernhard Krechting are executed in Münster for their roles in the Münster Rebellion.
- January 24 – King Henry VIII of England is seriously injured when he falls from his horse at a jousting tournament in Greenwich, after which the fully armored horse falls on him. The King is unconscious for two hours, sustaining an injury to an ulcerated leg and a concussion.
- February 2 – Spanish conquistador Pedro de Mendoza founds Buenos Aires in what is now Argentina.
- February 18 – A Franco-Ottoman alliance exempts French merchants from Ottoman law and allows them to travel, buy and sell throughout the sultan's dominions, and to pay low customs duties on French imports and exports. The compact is confirmed in 1569.
- February 25 – Tyrolean Anabaptist leader Jacob Hutter, founder of the Hutterites, is burned at the stake in Innsbruck for heresy.
- March 8 – Pargalı Ibrahim Pasha, Grand Vizier of the Ottoman Empire since 1523, is executed after falling into disfavor with Hürrem Sultan, the wife of Ottoman Sultan Suleiman the Magnificent. After Hürrem persuades her husband that Pargali Ibrahim has become a threat as his money and power have increased, Suleiman hosts an elaborate dinner with Pargali as his guest. After the dinner ends, Pargali prepares to go to bed but is seized and strangled upon reaching his bedroom.
- March 14 – Ayas Mehmed Pasha is appointed by the Sultan Suleiman to be the new Grand Vizier of the Ottoman Empire.
- March
  - The first edition of John Calvin's Institutes of the Christian Religion, a seminal work of Protestant systematic theology, is published in Basel.
  - The Italian War of 1536–1538 resumes between Francis I of France and Charles V, Holy Roman Emperor. Francis seizes control of Savoy, and captures Turin. Charles triumphally enters Rome, following the Via Triumphalis, and delivers a speech before the Pope and College of Cardinals, publicly challenging the king of France to a duel.

=== April–June ===
- April 6 – Count's Feud: Malmø surrenders to King Christian III of Denmark.
- April 14 – The Reformation Parliament in England passes an Act for the Dissolution of the monasteries. Religious houses closed as part of Henry VIII's dissolution include: Basingwerk Abbey, Bourne Abbey, Brinkburn Priory, Buildwas Abbey, Cartmel Priory, Dorchester Abbey, Dore Abbey, Haltemprice Priory, Keldholme Priory and Tintern Abbey.
- April – An Acte for Laws & Justice to be ministred in Wales in like fourme as it is in this Realme further incorporates the legal system of Wales into that of England.
- May 2 – Anne Boleyn, second queen of Henry VIII of England, is arrested on the grounds of incest, adultery, and treason.
- May 6 – Incan emperor Manco Inca Yupanqui, having on April 18 escaped from imprisonment in Cuzco, begins his revolt against his captors, when his army begins the 10-month Siege of Cuzco against a garrison of Spanish conquistadors and Indian auxiliaries, led by Hernando Pizarro.
- May 14 – Thomas Cranmer declares Henry VIII's marriage to Anne Boleyn to be null and void.
- May 19 – Anne Boleyn is beheaded.
- May 23 – The Inquisition is implemented in Portugal.
- May 30 – Henry VIII of England marries Jane Seymour.
- June 2 – Pope Paul III announces that he will send three legates to Charles V, Holy Roman Emperor; to King Ferdinand of Bohemia, Hungary and Croatia; and King François of France to prevent an outbreak of war in Europe.
- June 24 – San Juan Bautista del Teul is founded by Cristóbal de Oñate in New Spain.
- June 26 – Spanish navigator Andrés de Urdaneta and a few companions arrive in Lisbon from the Maluku Islands, completing a westward circumnavigation which began with the Loaísa expedition of 1525.
- June 27 – San Pedro Sula is founded by Pedro de Alvarado in Honduras.

=== July–September ===
- July 9 – The papal legation of Cardinals Marino Caracciolo, Francisco Quiñones, and Agostino Trivulzio meets with Emperor Charles V at Savigliano, south of Turin on orders of Pope Paul III.
- July 21 – The papal legation arrives in France, arriving at Lyon, to meet with King Francois I.
- July 24 – Three days after the arrival of the peacekeeping team in Lyon, and 15 days after the legation had met with the Holy Roman Emperor to avoid war, troops of the Holy Roman Empire invade France, crossing over the Var river from Nizza in Italy (now Nice in France) as well as invading Picardie with a second force.
- July 29 – The Count's Feud ends when Copenhagen surrenders to King Christian III of Denmark. On August 6 he marches into the city and on August 12 arrests the country's bishops, thus consolidating the Protestant Reformation in Denmark.
- August 5 – Guelders Wars: Battle of Heiligerlee – Danish allies of Charles II, Duke of Guelders, under command of Meindert van Ham, are defeated by Habsburg forces under Georg Schenck van Toutenburg in the Low Countries.
- August 10 – Francis III of Brittany, Dauphin of France, dies having caught a chill after a game of tennis which had developed into a fever; under torture Sebastiano de Montecuccoli, his Italian secretary, confesses to poisoning him and is brutally executed on October 7. Francis' younger brother, Henry, Duke of Orléans, succeeds as heir to the kingdom.
- September 1 – King James V becomes the first Scottish monarch since 1346 to voluntarily leave his kingdom, leaving six vice-regents— the Lord Chancellor Gavin Dunbar, Archbishop of Glasgow; James Beaton, Archbishop of St Andrews; the earls of Huntly, Montrose, and Eglinton, and Lord Maxwell— to govern the nation during his absence. King James sails from Kirkcaldy on the Royal Scots Navy flagship Mary Willoughby, along with 500 men and five other ships, to travel to France to meet his future bride, Princess Madeleine of Valois. The Scottish entourage docks in France at Dieppe one week later.

=== October–December ===
- October 1 – The Pilgrimage of Grace, a rebellion in England against Henry VIII's church reforms, begins in Lincolnshire and spreads across the kingdom to most of Yorkshire, and parts of Northumberland, Durham, Cumberland and Westmorland.
- October 6 – English Bible translator William Tyndale is burned at the stake in Vilvoorde, Brabant.
- October 10 – English barrister Robert Aske becomes the leader of the Pilgrimate of Grace rebels, whose numbers have grown to 9,000 and marches with them to York.
- October 16 – The three negotiators of Pope Paul III depart France after three months of discussions with representatives of King Francois I.
- November 4 – Cardinal Agostino Trivulzio, the envoy of Pope Paul III, files his report of his peace mission to negotiate an agreement between the Holy Roman Empire and France.
- November 13 –
  - On "a great misty morning such as hath seldom been seen", Robert Pakington, a London merchant and a member of the English Parliament, becomes the first person in Britain to be murdered with a handgun, while he is walking across the street from his home at Soper's Lane toward the Mercers' Chapel. His assailant is never caught, despite the offer of a large reward.
  - Robert Aske meets with royal delegates at York, including the Duke of Norfolk and negotiates the return of the homes of Catholic monks and nuns, as well as a safe passage for Aske and several Catholic representatives for a meeting with King Henry VIII.
- November 26 – At the Château de Blois, the marriage contract between King James V of Scotland and King Francois of France to arrange the marriage of James to Francois' daughter Madeline, is signed despite the reluctance of the French monarch to send his daughter to an unhealthy climate.
- December 5 – After two months, the Pilgrimage of Grace ends at Pontefract Castle after Thomas Howard, 3rd Duke of Norfolk promises to present a list of 24 Articles of the pilgrims' demands, "The Commons' Petition", to King Henry VIII. The duke pledges a reprieve for abbeys from dissolution until Parliament can meet, and to obtain a general pardon for the rebel pilgrims.

=== Date unknown ===
- Battle of Reynogüelén: Spanish conquistadors defeat a group of Mapuches in Chile, during the expedition of Diego de Almagro.
- Battle of Un no Kuchi: Takeda Family forces defeat Hiraga Genshin.
- Luis Sarmento is the Imperial ambassador to Portugal.

== Births ==
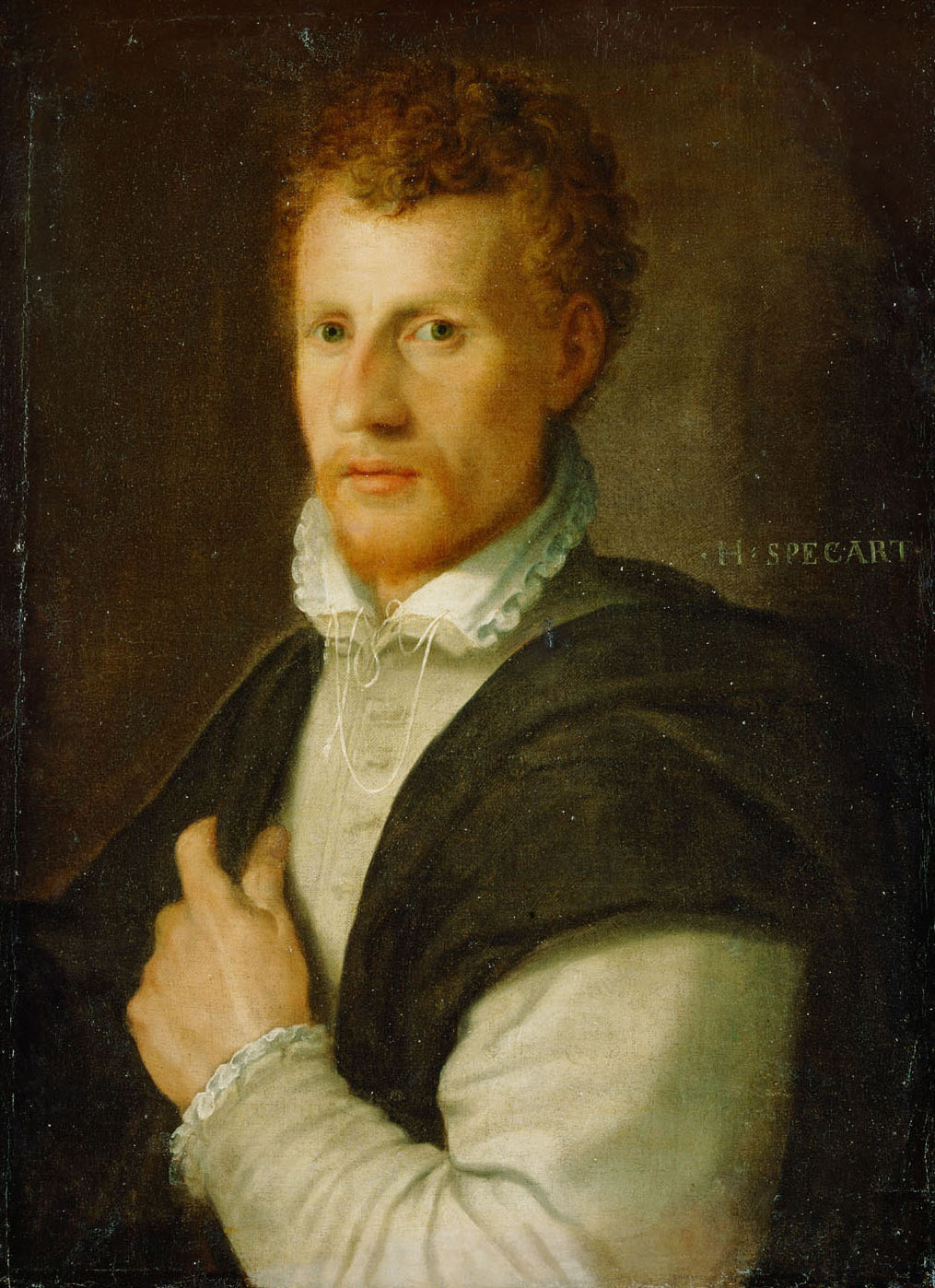
Cornelis Cort

- January 22 – Philibert, Margrave of Baden-Baden (d. 1569)
- February 2
  - Scévole de Sainte-Marthe, French poet (d. 1623)
  - Piotr Skarga, Polish writer (d. 1612)
- February 12 – Leonardo Donato, Doge of Venice (d. 1612)
- February 24 – Pope Clement VIII (d. 1605)
- March 6 – Santi di Tito, Italian painter (d. 1603)
- March 31 – Ashikaga Yoshiteru, Japanese shōgun (d. 1565)
- April 8 – Barbara of Hesse (d. 1597)
- May 3 – Stephan Praetorius, German theologian (d. 1603)
- May 13 – Jacobus Pamelius, Belgian bishop (d. 1587)
- August 10 – Caspar Olevian, German Protestant theologian (d. 1587)
- August 14 – René, Marquis of Elbeuf (d. 1566)
- August 24 – Matthäus Dresser, German humanist, philosopher and historian (d. 1607)
- October 18 – William Lambarde, English antiquarian, writer on legal subjects, politician (d. 1601)
- October 21 – Joachim Ernest, Prince of Anhalt (d. 1586)
- October 28 – Felix Plater, Swiss physician (d. 1614)
- November 11 – Marcantonio Memmo, Doge of Venice (d. 1615)
- November 22 – Johann VI of Nassau-Dillenburg (d. 1606)
- December 26 – Yi I, Korean Confucian scholar (d. 1584)
- December 29 – Henry VI, Burgrave of Plauen (d. 1572)
- date unknown
  - Hadım Mehmed Pasha, Ottoman statesperson (d. 1626)
  - Hoca Sadeddin Efendi, Ottoman scholar (d. 1599)
  - Chŏng Ch'ŏl, Korean administrator and poet (d. 1593)
  - Leonor de Cisneros, Spanish Protestant (d. 1568)
  - Juan de Fuca, Greek maritime pilot (d. 1602)
  - Charles Howard, 1st Earl of Nottingham, English statesman and admiral (d. 1624)
  - Roger Marbeck, chief physician to Elizabeth I of England (d. 1604)
  - Thomas Sackville, 1st Earl of Dorset, English statesman and poet (d. 1608)
  - Friedrich Sylburg, German classical scholar (d. 1596)
  - Ikeda Tsuneoki, Japanese military commander (d. 1584)
  - Giovanni de' Vecchi, Renaissance painter from Italy (d. 1614)

== Deaths ==
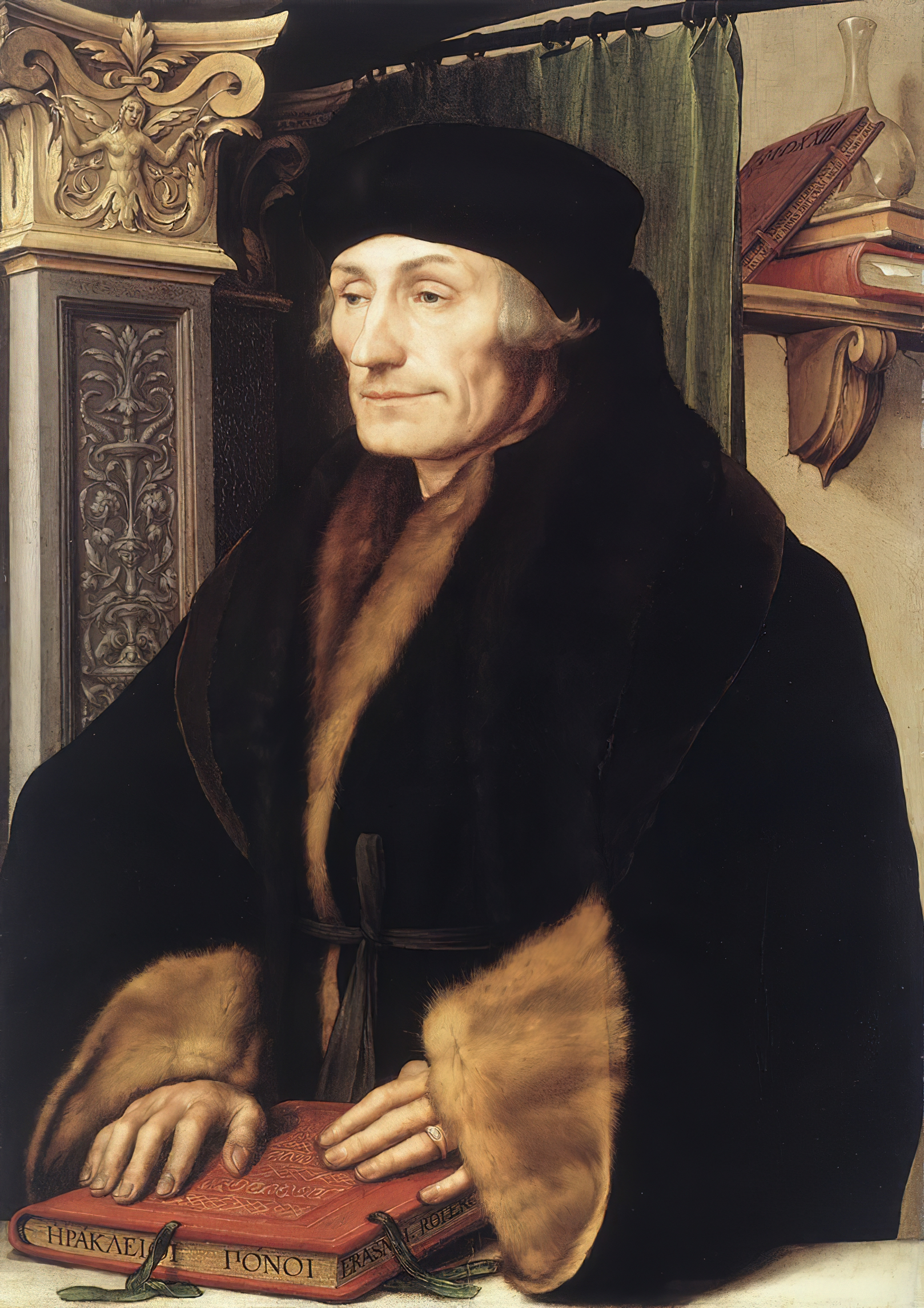
Erasmus

- January 6 – Baldassare Peruzzi, Italian architect and painter (b. 1481)
- January 7 – Catherine of Aragon, First Queen of Henry VIII of England (b. 1485)
- January 22
  - John of Leiden, Anabaptist leader from the Dutch city of Leiden (b. 1509)
  - Bernhard Knipperdolling, German religious leader (b. c. 1495)
- February 25
  - Berchtold Haller, German-born reformer (b. 1492)
  - Jacob Hutter, Tyrolean founder of the Hutterite religious movement (burned at the stake)
- March 15 – Pargalı Ibrahim Pasha, Ottoman grand vizier (b. 1493)
- April 4 – Frederick I, Margrave of Brandenburg-Ansbach (b. 1460)
- May 17 – George Boleyn, 2nd Viscount Rochford, English diplomat (executed, with four other men accused of adultery with the queen) (b. 1503)
- May 19 – Anne Boleyn, second queen of Henry VIII of England (executed) (b. c. 1501/1507)
- May 31 – Charles I, Duke of Münsterberg-Oels, Count of Kladsko, Governor of Bohemia and Silesia (b. 1476)
- June 29 – Bernhard III, Margrave of Baden-Baden (b. 1474)
- July 11 or July 12 – Erasmus, Dutch philosopher (b. 1466)
- July 23 – Henry FitzRoy, Duke of Richmond and Somerset, illegitimate son of Henry VIII of England (b. 1519)
- June 28 – Richard Pace, English diplomat (b. 1482)
- August 10 – Francis III of Brittany, Dauphin of France, brother of Henry II (b. 1518)
- September 25 – Johannes Secundus, Dutch poet (b. 1511)
- September 26 – Didier de Saint-Jaille, 46th Grandmaster of the Knights Hospitaller
- September 27 – Felice della Rovere, also known as Madonna Felice, was the illegitimate daughter of Pope Julius II (b. 1483)
- October 6 – William Tyndale, English Protestant Bible translator (b. c. 1494)
- October 14 – Garcilaso de la Vega, Spanish poet (b. 1503)
- December 21 – Sir John Seymour, English courtier (b. 1474)
- date unknown
  - Hector Boece, Scottish philosopher (b. 1465)
  - Cecilia Gallerani, principal mistress of Ludovico Sforza, Duke of Milan (b. 1473)
  - Hiraga Genshin, Japanese retainer and samurai
  - Guru Jambheshwar was the founder of the Bishnoi Panth(b. 1451)
  - John Rastell, English printer and author
  - Jacques Lefèvre d'Étaples, French theologian and humanist (b. c. 1450)
