= Bernhard Knipperdolling =

German leader of the Münster Anabaptists

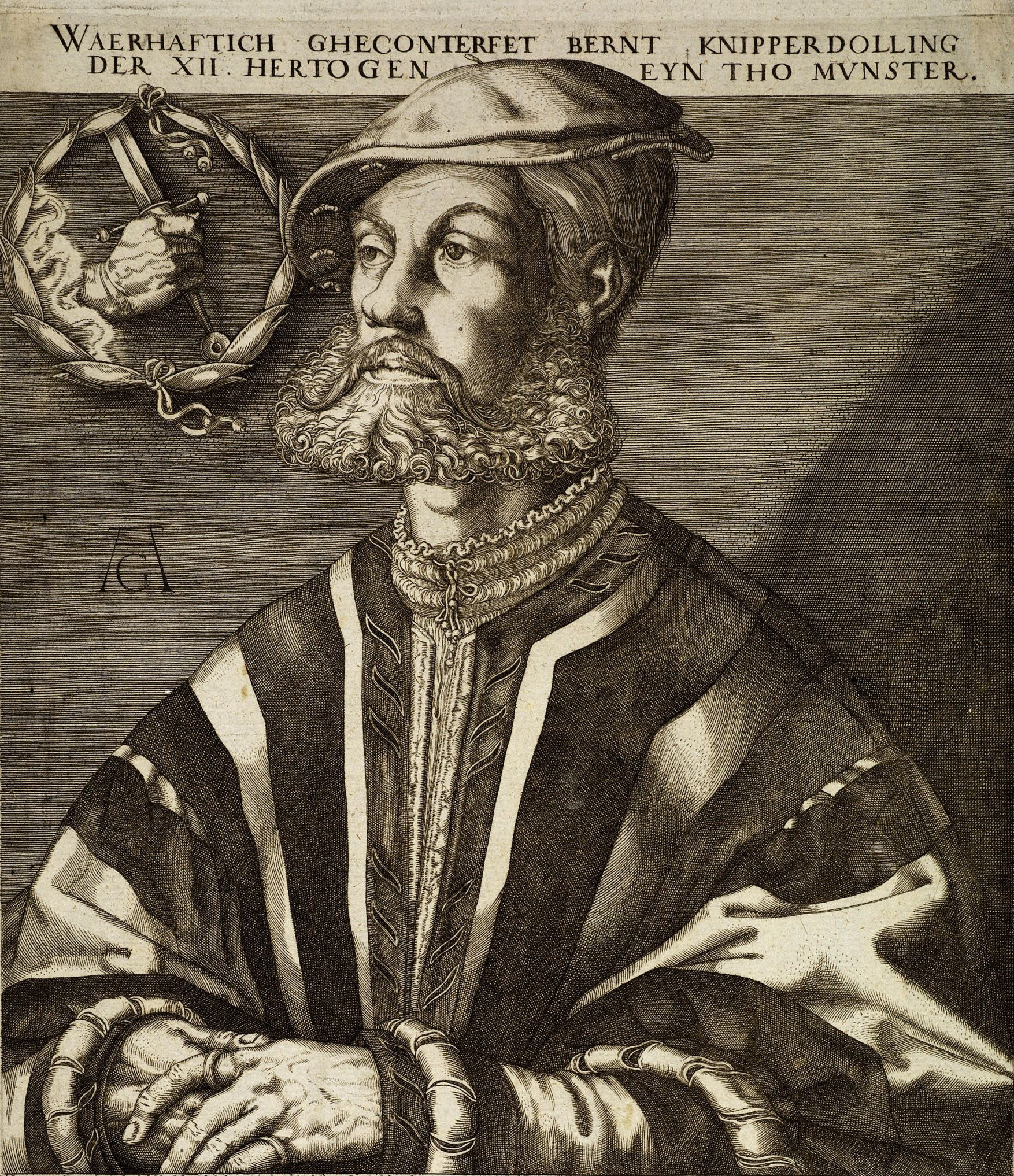
Bernt Knipperdolling, engraving originally by Heinrich Aldegrever.

Bernhard Knipperdolling (c. 1495 – January 22, 1536) was a German leader of the Münster Anabaptists. He was also known as Bernd or Berndt Knipperdollinck or Knypperdollynck or Bertrand Knipperdoling; his birth name was van Stockem. He was executed at the principal market in Munster.

== Early life ==
Born at the beginning of the sixteenth century in Münster, Knipperdolling was the son of a wealthy, patrician cloth merchant. Little is known of his life as a young man. He first came into the public eye when he became a guild leader in the city council. A follower of the preacher Bernhard Rothmann, in 1528 he showed his colours as a "bold and proud" Protestant by suing the Catholic Münster town council and the Bishop Franz von Waldeck at the Imperial Court of Justice. His position as guild leader meant he had the financial and political support of the guilds.

In January 1534, wandering Dutch Anabaptist preachers arrived in Münster proclaiming that a new prophet was on his way. They were soon followed by the "prophet" himself, the baker Jan Matthys of Haarlem. Knipperdolling became a passionate believer.

== Beliefs ==
- Initial (pre-conflict) pacifism
- Anti-clerical, anti-imperial socially mobile merchant
- Political pragmatist and strategist

Bernhard Knipperdolling taught that the righteous before the day of Judgment, [each person would] have a monarchy on earth and the wicked be destroyed, that men are not justified by their faith in Christ; that there is no original sin; that infants ought not to be baptized, and that immersion is the only mode of baptism; that every one has the authority to preach and administer the sacraments; that men are not obliged to pay respect to magistrates; that all things ought to be in common, and that it is lawful to marry many wives.

== Anabaptist revolution ==
On February 10, 1534, Knipperdolling joined the movement to overthrow the town council and bishop, along with Jan Matthys and Jan Bockelson (or John of Leiden), one of Matthys' twelve disciples. He rallied the Anabaptists against conservative forces with "frenzied ecstasies". Accepted by the council, Knipperdolling won the elections of 1534, becoming Lord Mayor of Münster. This was the high point of the Anabaptist movement. His house became the centre of the Anabaptist movement; on January 15, 1534 the first believers' baptisms were performed there.

When Matthys made his demand for the execution of all "godless" citizens of Münster, Knipperdolling convinced him to allow people a week's time to be baptised, or leave the city. This avoided arousing international opposition against Münster and risking internal stability.

Knipperdolling organised military defenses against the Bishop's troops. He was also made chief executioner to the Twelve Judges; as chief executive he balanced out Bockelson, the Judges' spokesman. He was in charge of executions, "immigration officer", and the administrator of state property. Some of Matthys' policies went against Knipperdolling's best interests, such as the dissolution of the guilds and the confiscation of private property.

After Matthys' death on April 4, 1534, Knipperdolling supported the leadership of Jan Bockelson, who was crowned king, supported by poor non-Münsterite Anabaptists. Soon, however, he was claiming superiority to Bockelson and prophesying that "while Jan was king according to the flesh", he, Knipperdolling, was "called to be the spiritual king". This led to his brief imprisonment in 1535. On his release, Knipperdolling was named Stadholder (vice-king and governor) and executioner. His daughter Clara was married to Jan Bockelson after the introduction of polygamy.

In 1535, Knipperdolling's position of power was however once again lost when Heinrich Krechting became the king's right-hand man.

On June 24–25, 1535, the Bishop, with the aid of the deserter Henry Gresbeck, retook Münster. Knipperdolling, Bockelson and Bernhard Krechting were imprisoned and interrogated. On January 22, 1536, Knipperdolling, Krechting, and Bockelson were publicly tortured and executed in Münster. Their corpses were suspended in metal baskets from the Lambertuskirche (St. Lambert's Church), which had been the initial focus of the Anabaptist revolution.

== Significance ==
As the worldly leader of the Münster Anabaptists, Knipperdolling was the "Steigbügelhalter" (facilitator, literally "stirrup-holder") and chief executive of the movement. Knipperdolling represented the local Münsterite basis of the revolution and his path shows their mode of adaptation to the siege situation and the rule of the Dutch Jans.

According to the Merriam-Webster dictionary the word "knipperdolling" once was used as a derogatory synonym for an Anabaptist and now generally refers to any person who is a religious fanatic.
