= Heinrich Krechting =

German Anabaptist leader (c. 1501–1580)

Heinrich Krechting (c. 1501 – 28 June 1580) was a leader of the radical Anabaptist movement in Münster.

Krechting was the son of the town clerk and organist Engelbert Krechting. He attended grammar school and married Elsle Oedefelt in 1526, daughter of a Schöppingen draper. They had four children. In 1531 he became mayor in Schöppingen. A year later he became a judge and Gograf (presiding judge) in the greatest Gogericht (regional court) of Münster.

In fall 1533 Jan van Leiden visited him, who possibly baptized him in January 1534. When Johann von der Wieck was arrested in early 1534, he fled with a large number of other citizens to Münster, where his brother Bernhard Krechting already was an Anabaptist preacher. Leiden appointed Krechting as his secretary and later as "Chancellor of the Kingdom" - his personal representative. Krechting was responsible for organizing the defenders against the siege.

As the cathedral fell through treachery after 16 months on 25 June 1535, Krechting barricaded himself with a few hundred survivors on the principal market in a wagon fort. They fought fiercely, and it was decided to guarantee the fighters their lives and a safe passage if they laid down their arms. Krechting and 24 of his comrades were allowed to leave town with a bishop's permit and 10 gold florins.

Krechting fled first to Lingen and tried with the toleration of Count Anton of Oldenburg to rally the Anabaptists again.

On 22 January 1536, his brother Bernhard was executed in Münster, along with van Leiden and Bernhard Knipperdolling.

After the execution of Jan van Batenburg in February 1538, he was leader of the radical Anabaptists. His efforts to choose a new king and win back Münster during the Oldenburg feud in 1538 failed due to the weakness of his movement.

When Count Anton of Oldenburg removed the Anabaptists from his country in 1538, Krechting was able to remain and find shelter in Gödens. Nothing more is known about his work as an Anabaptist after that time. In 1580, he died a respected man. His grandson Knechting and his great-grandson Hermann Wachmann were mayors of Bremen.
