= Bernhard Rothmann =

German Anabaptist leader, 1495–1535

Bernhard Rothmann (also Bernd or Berndt; c. 1495 – c. 1535) was a 16th-century radical and Anabaptist leader in the city of Münster. He was born in Stadtlohn, Westphalia, around 1495.

== Life ==
In the late 1520s Bernard Rothmann became the leader for religious reform in the city of Münster. In his sermons he condemned Catholic doctrines such as purgatory and the use of images, as well as the low morals of the priests. He suffered censure of the Catholic bishop in 1531, and afterwards denied the authority of the Catholic Church and openly aligned himself with the Reformed faith. In January 1532, he published an evangelical creed, and gained the backing of the city authorities. In the treaty of 14 February 1533, Münster was recognized as a Lutheran city. In the summer of 1533, Rothmann was converted by the Anabaptist disciples of Melchior Hoffman to "anti-pedobaptism". He began to preach against infant baptism from his pulpit at St. Lambert's church. Though censured by the city council, he remained safe through his popularity with the craft guilds. Rothmann strengthened his standing by gaining more converts to his position.

When Melchior Hoffman was imprisoned in Strasbourg, Jan Matthys took over the Anabaptist leadership role in the Low Countries. He declared Münster to be the place to which Jesus Christ would return and set up his kingdom. In January 1534, Matthys sent disciples to Münster to declare the city as the "New Jerusalem", and quickly baptized numerous converts, including Bernhard Rothmann. Rothmann was baptized on 5 January 1534.

Matthys arrived in Münster in February 1534. His "rule" of the city set the stage for the events usually called the Münster rebellion. While Matthys was the prophet and leader, Rothmann was probably the most important "theological voice". Matthys died in a failed military attempt on Easter Sunday 1534. John of Leiden thereafter became King of Münster until its fall in June 1535. Rothmann may have died fighting during the reconquest of Münster, or may have escaped during the turmoil. His body was not identified, but he was apparently not among the only group of surviving Anabaptist fighters - a small band around Heinrich Krechting - that contemporary sources attest to, and unlike Krechting's men, Rothmann was never heard from again.

== Theology ==
=== Baptism ===
Unlike many of the 16th-century Anabaptists, Rothmann held immersion to be the proper mode of baptism. According to historian Darren T. Williamson, "He based his position primarily on three arguments: first, he argued along grammatical lines, not Greek grammar but Dutch/German. He contended that the meaning of the Dutch translation of baptism must be taken literally. Fortunately, the Dutch words doepen and dumpelen meant literally to immerse or 'dunk in water'. Although Rothmann was technically correct on this point of grammar, it was also as commonly understood that there was a long standing theological exception as practiced by the church, namely sprinkling. Second, the Scriptural explanations of baptism in such passages as Rom 6:3-4 (baptism = burial), Col 2:11-13 (baptism = burial), and 1 Pet 3:21 (baptism = washing of the body, or bath) graphically describe an immersion. Third, he cited a few ancient authorities, Tertullian, Origen, Gratian's Decretum, and Beatus Rhenanus (by which he meant collections of ancient texts edited by Rhenanus, a contemporary of Rothmann), who at least to some degree supported directly or indirectly adult baptism and immersion."

=== Bible ===
Rothmann accepted the entire Bible as the word of God. In his Restitution he wrote, "The divine, unquestionably Holy Scriptures which are called the Bible alone have the fame that they are needful and sufficient for teaching reproof, correction and for instruction in righteousness for which purpose also almighty God has given them in order that the man of God be without error and equipped for every good work. Since the apostasy first began through human writing and teaching by means of which the divine Scriptures were darkened the Almighty has among us provided that all writings both new and old which are not biblical should he destroyed so that we should cling only to the Holy Scriptures."

=== Christology ===
The Christology that Rothmann held was the "celestial flesh" idea of Kaspar Schwenkfeld and Melchior Hoffman (and later of Menno Simons). See Theology of Anabaptism.

=== Church ===
Rothmann believed the church to be a congregation of only baptized believers. In his Confession he wrote, "The church of Christ is a gathering of the believing children of God who praise the name of God. No one else belongs in it...The Scriptures richly testify that faith comes from hearing the Word and that the holy church be built only of those who believe. It cannot be denied that the true proclamation of the holy gospel started the holy church...The second thing through which the holy church is built is holy baptism. Baptism is the entry and gateway to the holy church; therefore according to God's order no one may be allowed into the church except through baptism."

=== Polygamy ===
Rothmann initially opposed the polygamy introduced to Münster by John of Leiden, but would later write in theological defense of the idea. He wrote, "God has restored the true practice of holy matrimony amongst us." "Marriage is the union of man and wife - 'one' has now been removed - for the honor of God and to fulfill his will, so that children might be brought up in the fear of God." "This was true of the biblical fathers until the time of the Apostles, nor has polygamy been forbidden by God," he said. Rothmann based the legitimacy of the practice on a greater emphasis on the Old Testament than was common among most Anabaptists, as well as the Anabaptist view of marriage for the purpose of procreation.

== Legacy ==
Rothmann influenced the south German Anabaptists through Pilgram Marpeck, who borrowed some of his Vermanung from Rothmann's Bekenntnisse of 1533. He was part of the earliest movement, as a disciple of Melchior Hoffman, that laid the foundations of Anabaptism in the Netherlands and northern Germany. Rothmann's view of the incarnation would be the predominant view among Dutch Anabaptists in their first century of history (though Hoffman is much more the source).

== Works ==
- A Confession of Faith and Life in the Church of Christ of Münster (1534)
- A Restitution of Christian Teaching, Faith, and Life (October 1534).
- Concerning Revenge (December 1534)
