= Munsterites =

Munsterites may refer to:

- Münster rebellion, an Anabaptist movement which ruled in Münster from 1534–1535
- Münster, a city in North Rhine-Westphalia, Germany (793-)
- Prince-Bishopric of Münster, an ecclesiastical principality in the Holy Roman Empire (1173-1803)
- Münster (region), a Regierungsbezirke of North Rhine-Westphalia, Germany (1815-)
