= Heinrich Gresbeck =

Participant in 1534 Munster Rebellion

Heinrich Gresbeck, also known as Henry Gresbeck, was a carpenter who was living in the city of Münster in 1534 when the Münster Rebellion began. He wrote the only eyewitness account of events within the city for the fifteen months duration of the rebellion, and played a key role in the recapture of the city by guiding the siege forces of Franz von Waldeck, Bishop of Münster, inside the fortress gates on 25 June 1535.

For these actions, Gresbeck has been described in various texts as a "convert", "traitor", "collaborator", "deserter", "chronicler", and "disgruntled city refugee".

== Sources ==
- "False Prophets and Preachers: Henry Gresbeck’s Account of the Anabaptist Kingdom of Münster" —by Heinrich Gresbeck, translated and edited by Christopher S. Mackay, published by Truman State University Press -- ISBN 9781612481418

Before now, Gresbeck’s account was only available in a heavily edited German copy adapted from inferior manuscripts. Christopher S. Mackay, who previously produced the only modern translation of the main Latin account of these events, has adhered closely to Gresbeck’s own words to produce the first complete and accurate English translation of this important primary source. — -- extract from the book description

- "Gresbeck, Heinrich (16th century) - GAMEO". gameo.org.
- "A Companion to Anabaptism and Spiritualism, 1521-1700"—edited by John Roth, James Stayer, published by BRILL -- ISBN 9789004154025
- Arthur, Anthony (1999). The tailor-king: the rise and fall of the Anabaptist kingdom of Münster (1st ed.). New York: Thomas Dunne Books. ISBN 978-0-312-20515-7.
- "Messiahs and Messianic Movements through 1899"—by Roland H. Worth, Jr. (page 118), published by McFarland & Company -- ISBN 9780786482276
- Kerssenbroch, Hermann von; Mackay, Christopher S. (2007). Narrative of the Anabaptist madness: the overthrow of Münster, the famous Metropolis of Westphalia. Studies in the history of Christian traditions. Leiden ; Boston [Mass.]: Brill. ISBN 978-90-04-15721-7.
- Williams, George Huntston (2000). The radical Reformation. Sixteenth century essays & studies (3. ed., rev. and expanded ed.). Kirksville, Mo: Truman State Univ. Press. ISBN 978-0-943549-83-5.
- von der Lippe, George B.; Reck-Malleczewen, Viktoria M. (2008), von der Lippe, George B.; Reck-Malleczewen, Viktoria M. (eds.), "Day of Wrath (Dies Irae)", A History of the Münster Anabaptists, New York: Palgrave Macmillan US, pp. 153–164, doi:10.1057/9780230612563_9, ISBN 978-1-349-37300-0, retrieved 2026-10-20
- "The Anabaptist Commune of Münster 1534 -1535", a sourced article on the All Empires Project
- "Orgies and executions: It's mayhem in Münster", an article written by Mike Stuchbery for The Local Europe GmbH.
