= Elisabeth Wandscherer =

Dutch anabaptist

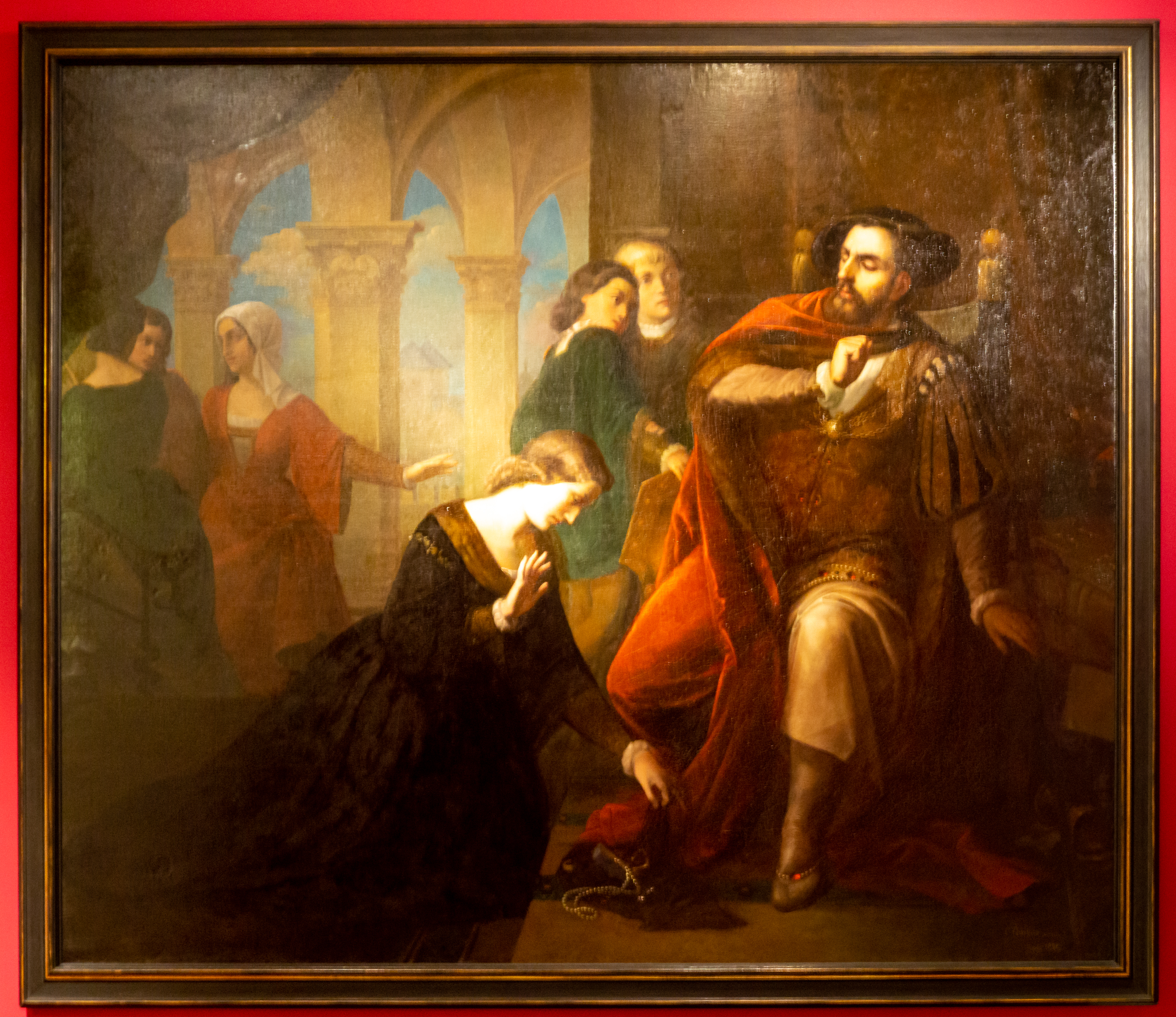
- Spouse(s): John of Leiden

Elisabeth Wandscherer (died 12 June 1535) was a Dutch Anabaptist.

She lived in Münster during the reign of Jan van Leiden and was chosen by him as one of his sixteen spouses in June 1534, when he introduced polygamy because women in the city greatly outnumbered surviving men. During the starvation of 1535, she openly criticized Leiden by saying that it could not be the will of God that the public should starve while Leiden and his court lived in luxury. She returned the jewelry given to her by Leiden and asked to leave the city. He refused, had her arrested and beheaded on 12 June 1535.

Her execution was frequently used in propaganda attacking the Anabaptists.

== See also ==
- Hille Feicken
