= In Nomine Dei =

Portuguese play by José Saramago

In Nomine Dei is a 1993 Portuguese-language play by José Saramago which tells the story of the Anabaptist Münster Rebellion of 1534. It was the basis for the 1993 opera Divara - Wasser und Blut, by Azio Corghi.
