= Divara – Wasser und Blut =

1993 opera by Azio Corghi

- Opera by Azio Corghi
- Librettist: Azio Corghi
- Language: German
- Based on: In Nomine Dei by José Saramago
- Premiere: 31 October 1993; Theater Münster

Divara – Wasser und Blut (Divara, Water and Blood) is a German-language opera by Azio Corghi to a libretto by the composer after the play In Nomine Dei by José Saramago, which tells the story of the Dutch "Anabaptist queen" Divara van Haarlem and the Münster Rebellion of 1534.

The opera was premiered at Theater Münster 31 October 1993. The opera had originally been conceived for performance in Italian, as Divara – acqua e sangue, as the composer's previous collaboration with Saramago, Blimunda, based on the 1994 novel Baltasar and Blimunda (original title Memorial do convento).

== Recordings ==
- Divara – Wasser und Blut, Münster Symphony Orchestra, Münster Theater Chorus, Musikverein Chorus, conductor: Will Humburg, 1993 Naxos Records
