= St. Lambert's Church, Münster =

Church in Münster, Germany

- St. Lambert's Church, Münster
- Lambertikirche
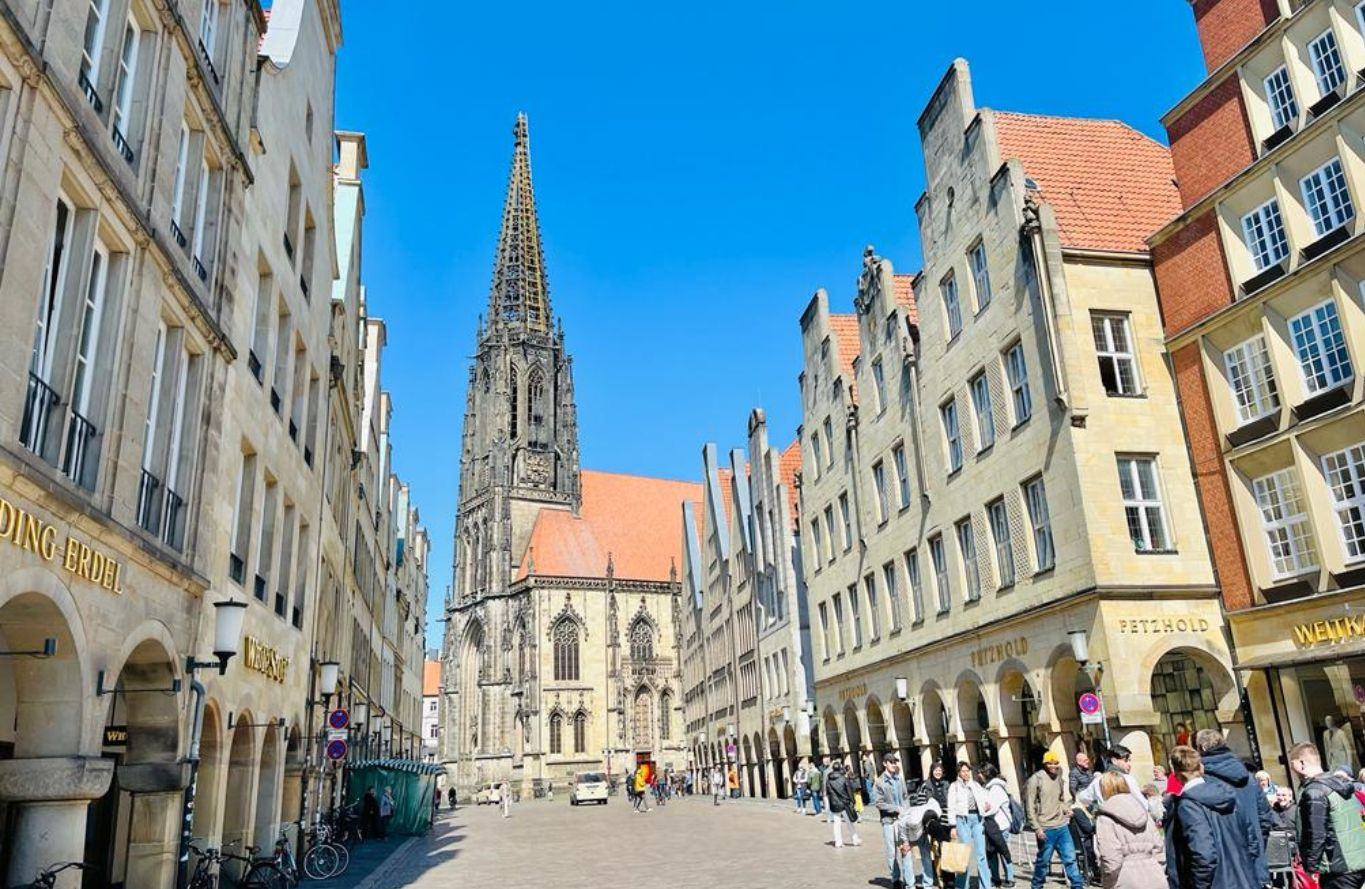
- St. Lambert's Church
- St. Lambert's Church, Münster
- 51°57′46″N 7°37′43″E
- Country: Germany
- Denomination: Roman Catholic
- Website: www.sanktlamberti.de

History
- Status: Parish church
- Founded: 1 January 1375

Architecture
- Functional status: Active
- Style: Late gothic and gothic revival
- Completed: 1450

Administration
- Diocese: Münster

Clergy
- Rector: Hans-Bernd Köppen, also cathedral provost of Münster Cathedral

St. Lambert's Church (German: St. Lamberti) is a Roman Catholic church building in Münster (Westphalia) in Germany, dedicated to Lambert of Maastricht. Its present building is the most significant example of Westphalian late Gothic architecture. It lies on the north side of the Prinzipalmarkt (main market square) in the city centre. Until the early 20th century, the Roggenmarkt (which also borders the church) contained the Drubbels district of housing. To the church's east lies the Alte Fischmarkt and the Salzstraße, whilst between the church and the Salzstraße is the Lambertikirchplatz with the Lambertibrunnen.

Three iron baskets hang from the church tower – in 1536, these were used to expose the corpses of Jan van Leiden, Bernhard Krechting, and Bernhard Knipperdolling after they were publicly tortured and killed in the Prinzipalmarkt for leading the Münster Rebellion. In 2007, the twentieth episode of the TV-series Wilsberg, 'Die Wiedertäufer' ('The Anabaptists'), was filmed at the church.

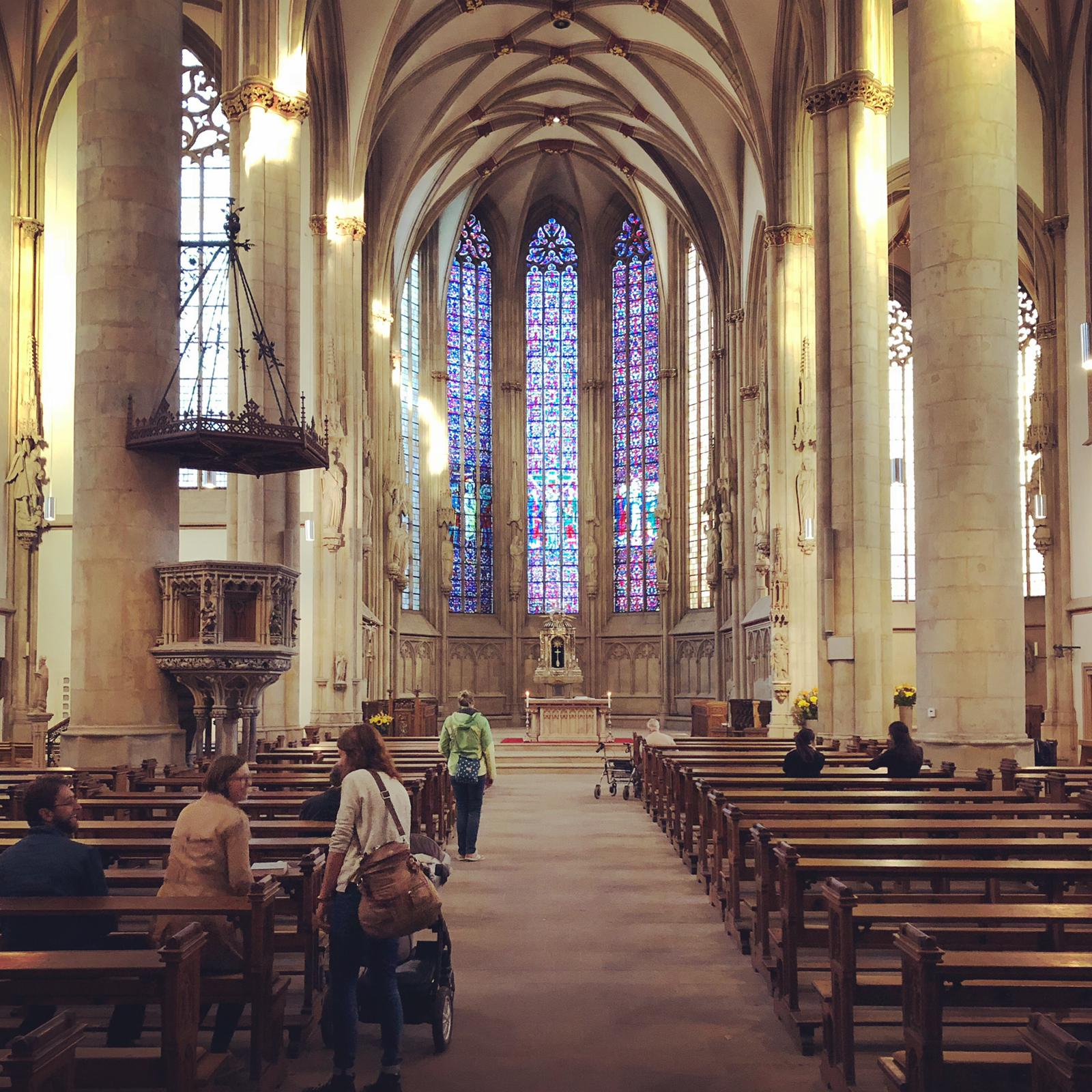
Saint Lamberti Münster Interior

== History ==
=== To 1375 ===
Around 1000, there was a wooden church in the merchants' settlement close to the so-called Domburg, near the city's first cathedral. Just before 1100, the wooden church was rebuilt in stone. This second church was probably destroyed in 1125. In 1150, it was replaced by a vaulted single nave stone church in the Romanesque style, retaining the previous church's west tower and extending it from 17 to 21 meters high by adding two more storeys to its original one. In 1170 Münster was granted the rights of a city, and nineteen years later, portions of the single parish served by that church were split off to form the parishes of St. Ludgeri, St. Aegidi, and possibly St. Martini.

In 1270, a three-nave Gothic hall church was built on the site. The west tower was extended again at the same time, this time with an additional storey taking it up to 40 metres. The facade of the 1270 extension contains a 1302 Jewish gravestone looted during the 1350 Pogroms.

=== Late Middle Ages ===
The city's merchants financed the construction of the present building as a marketplace church and a city church. The foundation stone was laid in 1375. Since 1379, a 'Türmer' has blown a horn from the church tower every half-hour between 9 pm and midnight from Wednesday to Monday. Since 2014, the post has been held by Martje Saljé.

The choir was completed in 1422, and the octagonal south choir chapel in 1448. The nave was built in several stages from 1450 onwards, including the main southwest doorway with a relief of the tree of Jesse (the original of which is now in the Bode Museum in Berlin). The vaulting of the choir and nave was only completed in 1525. The original plans included a new tower to replace the medieval one, but this proved too expensive, and instead, yet another floor was added to the existing tower, bringing it to 50 metres high and also adding a pointed cupola, which survived until the 19th century.

=== 1900–present ===
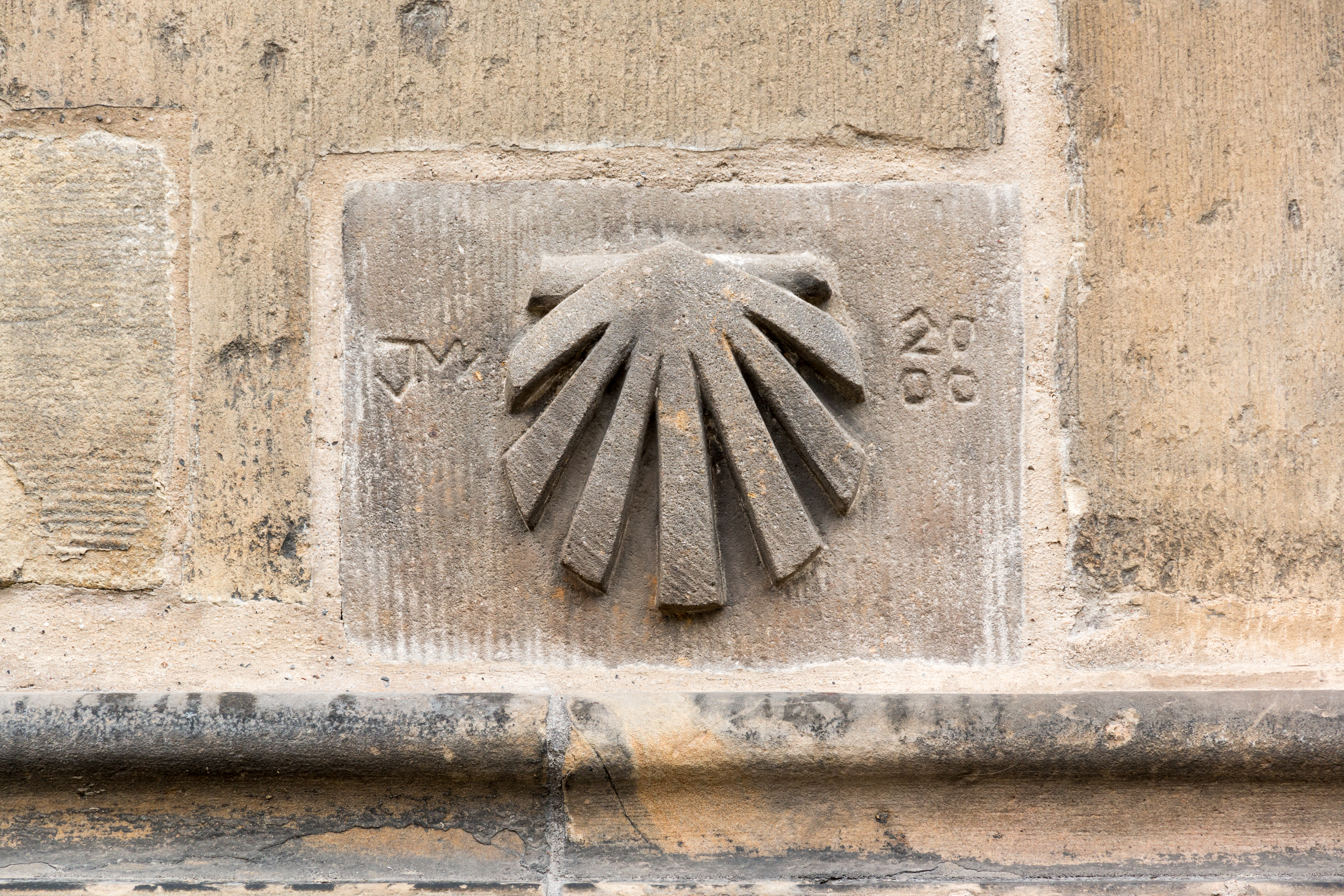
Signs of Way of Saint James

By the end of the 19th century, the foundations were no longer able to support the west tower (by then three times its original height) and it was in danger of collapse. Some argued for its preservation, but this was prevented by the Kulturkampf between the Kingdom of Prussia and the Roman Catholic Church. Instead, it was decided to demolish and rebuild part of the tower. Bishop Johann Georg Müller commissioned Arnold Güldenpfennig to carry out the works in 1865, but he failed to begin the project, and so in 1870 a competition was held to decide his replacement – the only differences between the competing plans were their approaches to the upper storey. August Rincklake won the competition and begun work in 1871 by adding a new tower and replacing the church roof. The old tower was totally demolished in 1887, and the following year a 90.5-metre high new neo-Gothic was begun to designs by the diocesan architect Hilger Hertel, deliberately designed to look different from the old tower. On Hertel's death in 1890 (a sculpture of him was added to the interior of the base of the tower) the tower had reached the same height as the church. His son Bernhard completed it to its full height between 1895 and 1898. It was a smaller copy of the towers of Freiburg Minster, though it was also influenced by the new towers of Cologne Cathedral, completed in 1880.

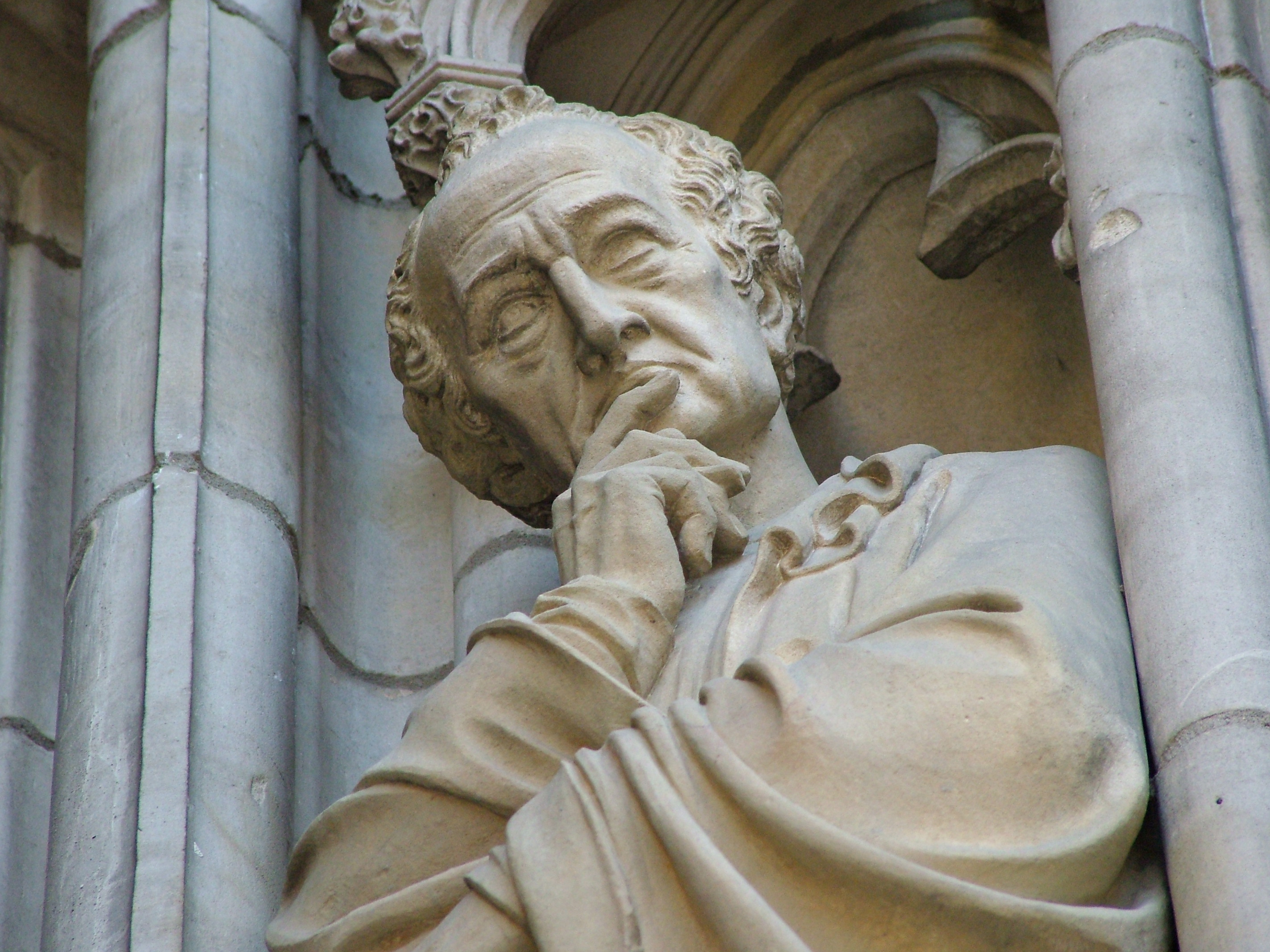
Johann Wolfgang von Goethe on the west facade

Statues of the Four Evangelists were installed around the main west door in 1911 – the figure of John has the face of Friedrich Schiller and that of Luke of Johann Wolfgang von Goethe, marking the Geheime Rat's visit to Münster in 1792. One pillar of the octagonal tower, the roof and the eastern vaulting were destroyed during World War Two. The church hosted two of the three 1941 sermons by bishop Clemens August Graf von Galen against the Nazi Aktion T4 – he had been its parish priest from 1929 to 1933. In June 1942 the bells were taken down. A temporary roof was installed in 1946 and all the war damage had been repaired by 1959. The roof was replaced at its higher late medieval level rather than the heavily articulated neo-Gothic ceiling and the sacristy was rebuilt in the modern style, but otherwise, the lost portions were rebuilt as they had been pre-war, following the 19th-century rebuilding by Hans Ostermann. The main west door has not been opened since a light-installation from 31 October to 1 November 2017. In 2022 the southern door and main entrance was renovated by installing the glass artwork "L'Or" by René Blättermann. Also since 2022 a light installation by Billie Thanner called "Himmelsleiter" is exhibited hanging above the baptismal fountain and on the outside of the large gothic revival tower.

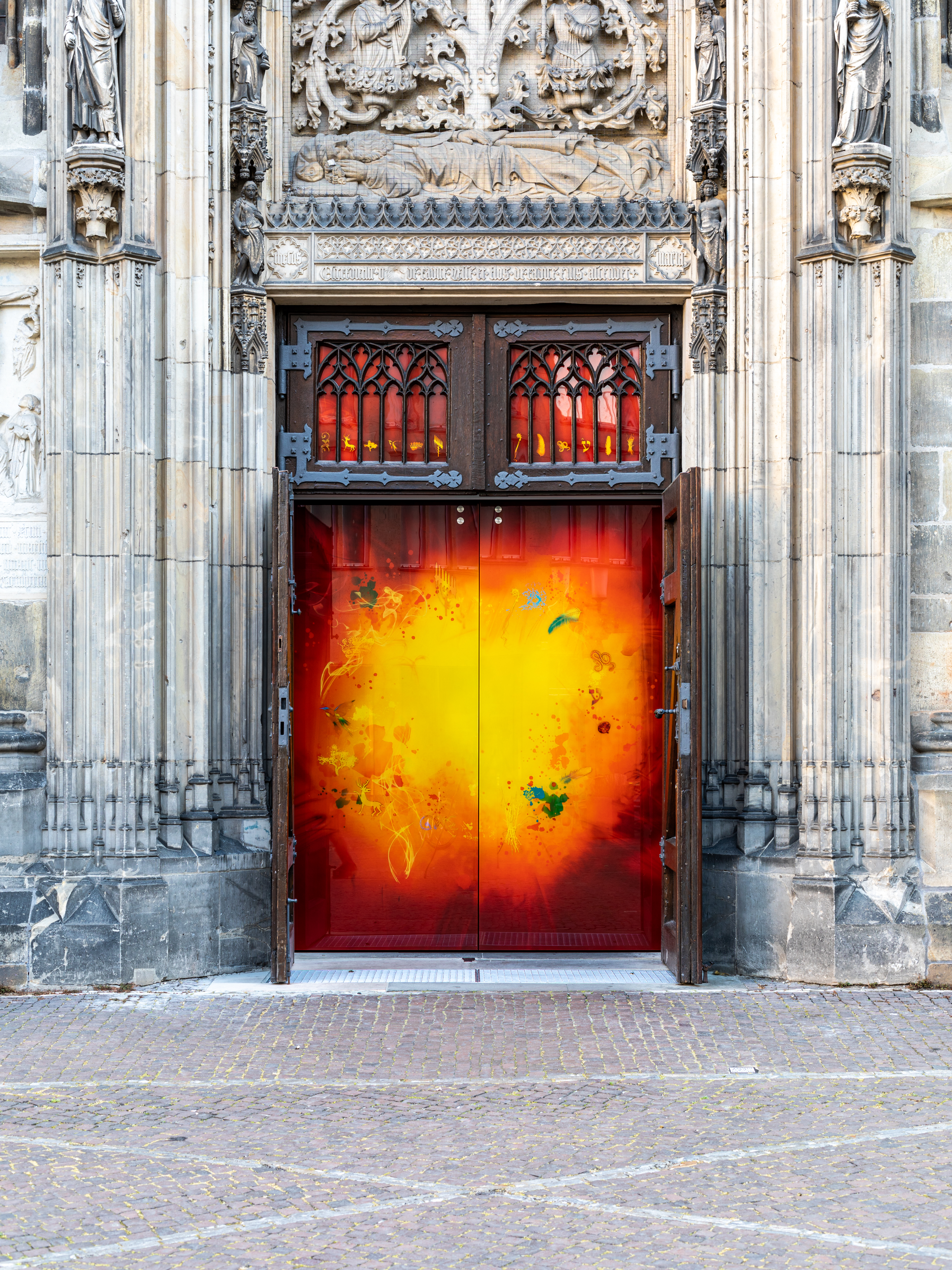
Glass artwork "L'Or"

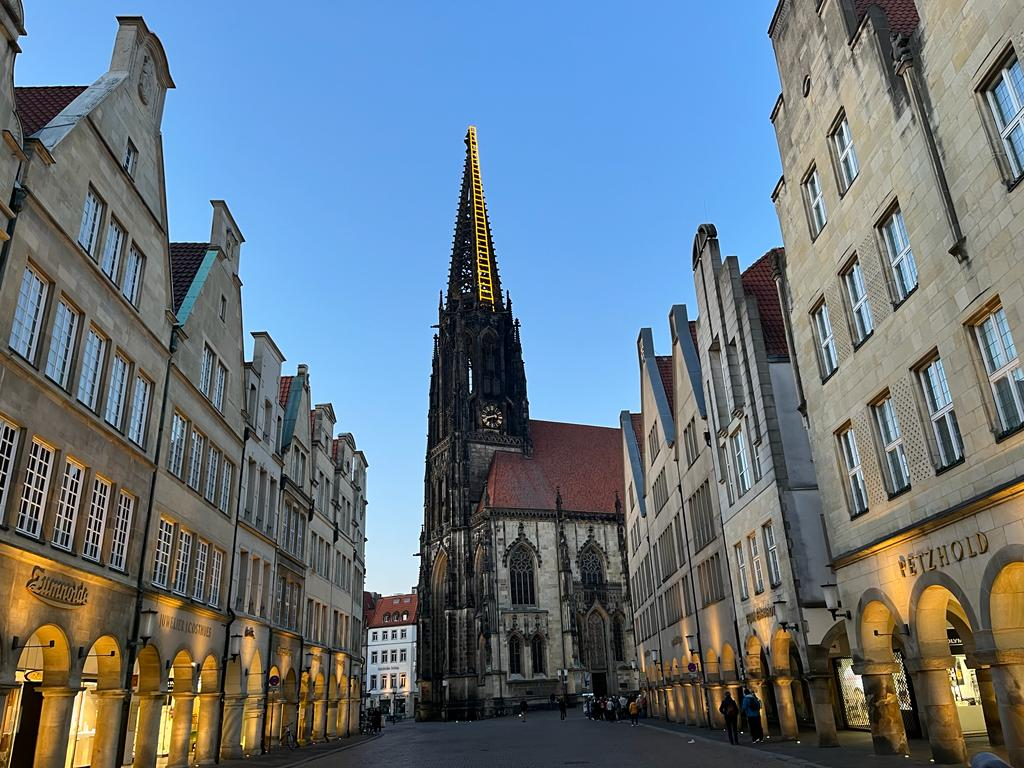
Saint Lambert's with the Billi Thanner "Himmelsleiter" as seen from Prinzipalmarkt

== Cages ==
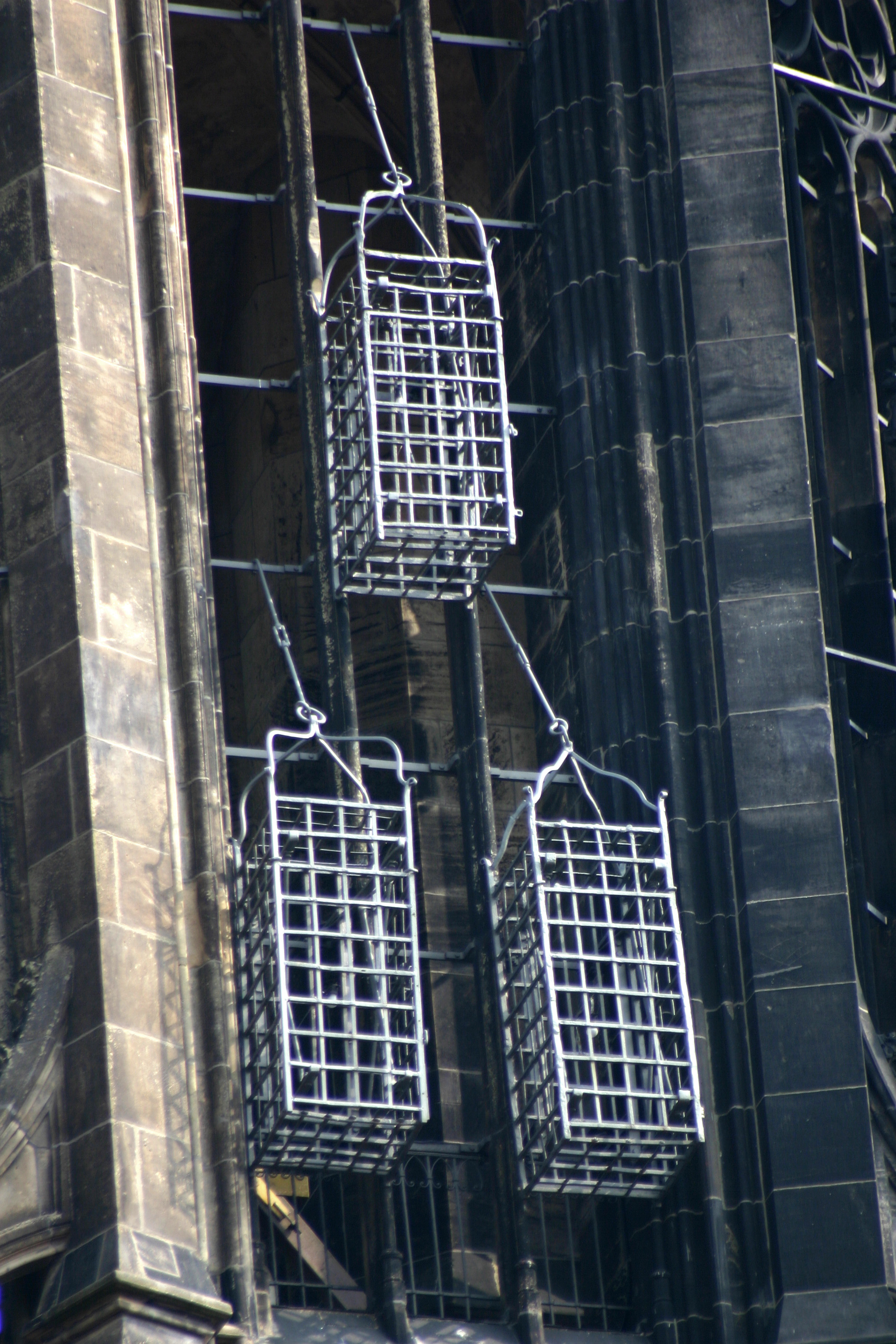
Cages

=== Origin ===
The failure of the one year radical anabaptist Münster rebellion in 1535 led to the capture and torture of John of Leiden, Bernhard Knipperdolling, and Bernhard Krechting. Following the execution of the three men in January 1536, the remains of their bodies were placed in the three cages (gibbets) for 50 years as a warning to other would-be rebels.

=== 1800–2000 ===
Following the demolition and reconstruction of the spire in the 19th century, the cages were replaced back to their original position following minor repair to parts damaged by rust.

On 18 November 1944, the church received a direct hit during a RAF bombing of the city. The highest cage came crashing to the ground whilst another fell into the organ loft. The third cage was left precariously dangling from the spire. When the church was repaired in 1948, the three cages were returned to their original positions.

In 1987, the church installed three yellow bulbs in each of the cages to be lit from dusk until dawn each night "in memory of their departed souls."

== Organs and church music ==
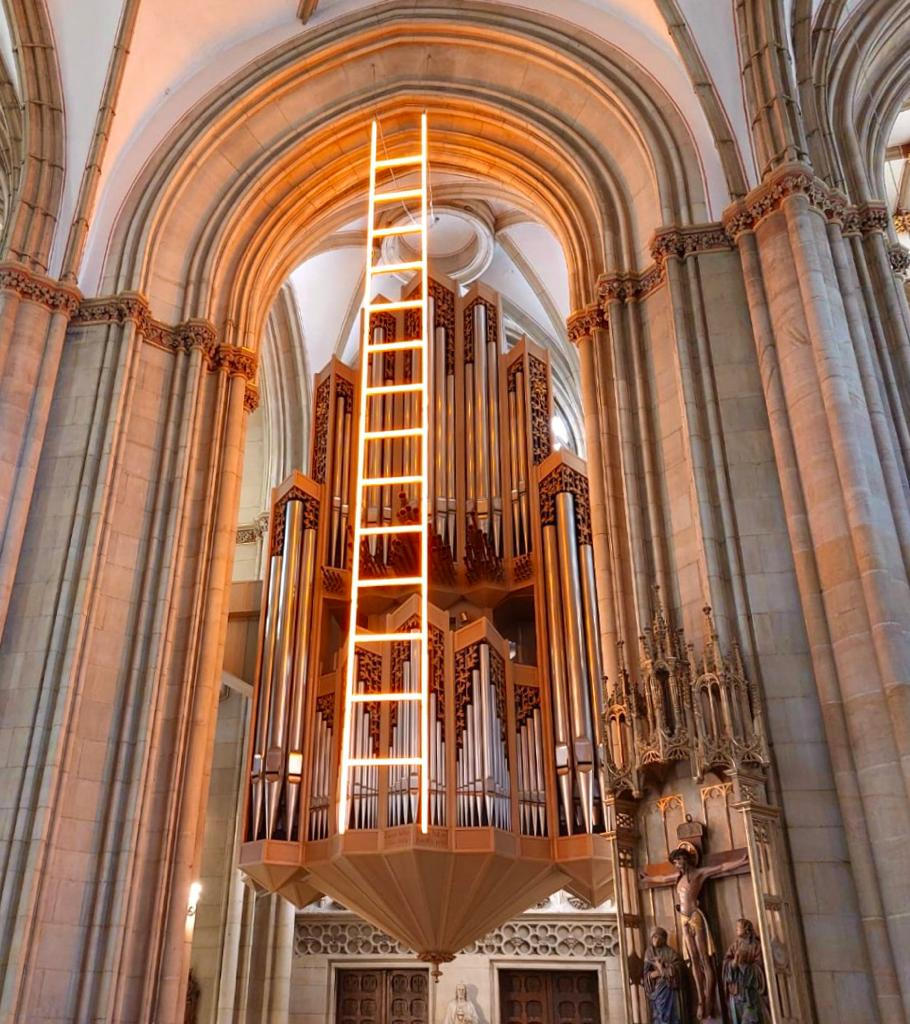
The great Karl Schuke Organ from 1988

The St. Lamberti Church has two organs: the large main organ with 55 stops on four manuals built by Karl Schuke in 1988 in the west, and a small mobile choir organ by Johannes Rohlf built in 2004.

The main organist of Saint Lambert's parish is Professor Tomasz Adam Nowak, who teaches organ improvisation at the Hochschule für Musik in Detmold.

The earliest instrument can be traced back to 1386. In the sixteenth century, an organ was built in 1538. Another (new) instrument was probably completed around 1580 or 1590. This instrument with 25 registers on three manuals and pedal later came to the Catholic church in Alstätte in the Ahaus district.

Since 2020, St. Lambert's parish has a musical scholarship program called "Lamberti Scholars" for young singers between 18–28 years, starting every three years. The scholars sing at least once a month in a Sunday evening eucharist and in various concerts and services around the year. They are currently led by First Cantor Maximilian Betz, who is also leading the parish's chamber choir.

== Bells ==
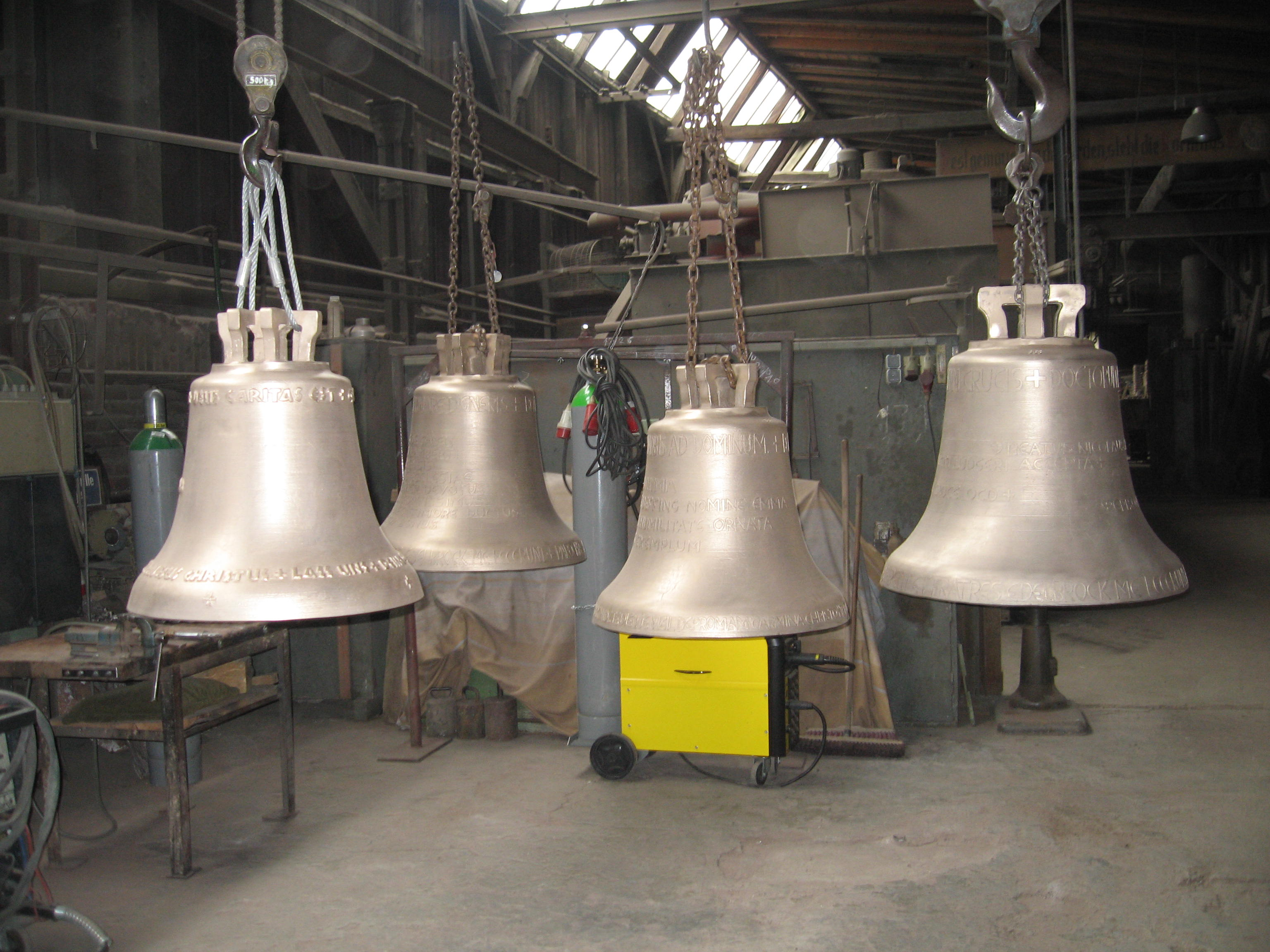
Bells

Number	Name	Year cast	Foundry	Weight	Diameter
1	Lambertus	1493	Gerhardus de Wou	2,400 kilograms (5,300 lb)	1,520 millimetres (60 in)
2	Great Catharine	1617	Henricus Caesem	1,750 kilograms (3,860 lb)	1,420 millimetres (56 in)
3	Maria (Mother of Jesus)	1493	Gerhardus de Wou	1,000 kilograms (2,200 lb)	1,195 millimetres (47.0 in)
4	Maria Droste zu Vischering	2008	Petit & Gebr. Edelbrock	1,000 kilograms (2,200 lb)	1,180 millimetres (46 in)
5	Little Katharina	1497	Wolter Westerhues	450 kilograms (990 lb)	905 millimetres (35.6 in)
6	Nils Stensen and Edith Stein	2008	Petit & Gebr. Edelbrock	450 kilograms (990 lb)	890 millimetres (35 in)
7	Clemens August Graf von Galen	2008	Petit & Gebr. Edelbrock	350 kilograms (770 lb)	820 millimetres (32 in)
8	Sister Maria Euthymia	2008	Petit & Gebr. Edelbrock	230 kilograms (510 lb)	710 millimetres (28 in)
I	Fire Bell	1594	Herman von Essen	1,500 kilograms (3,300 lb)	1,355 millimetres (53.3 in)

== See also ==
- List of Gothic Cathedrals in Europe
