= Hille Feicken =

Hille Feicken (died 27 June 1534) was a Dutch Anabaptist and rebel.

She was born to the worker Feicke in Wirdum in Friesland and married Psalmus van Utrecht: no children are known. Her spouse joined the Anabaptist theocracy in Münster, and later sent for her to join him there, and she handed out their property in Sneek to the poor before she left. During the Münster Rebellion, she worked with the other women of the town to strengthen the besieged city walls.

On the early morning of 16 June 1534, she left the city with the purpose to seduce and kill the commander of the enemy forces, Bishop Franz von Waldeck, in the manner of Judith and Holophernes. Later, she stated that she acted only on her own initiative and her own idea. She failed, was discovered, interrogated and executed.
