= Luis Sarmento =

16th-century Imperial ambassador of Portugal

Luis Sarmento was the Imperial ambassador to Portugal in 1536. He represented Charles V, Holy Roman Emperor and King of Spain.
