= Batenburgers =

Dutch Anabaptist sect

The Batenburgers were members of a radical Anabaptist sect led by Jan van Batenburg, that flourished briefly in the 1530s in the Netherlands, in the aftermath of the Münster Rebellion. They were called zwaardgeesten (sword-minded) by the nonviolent mainstream Anabaptists.

== Jan van Batenburg ==
Jan van Batenburg was born around 1495, the illegitimate son of nobleman Dirk van Batenburg from Gelderland, and became mayor of a town in the Oversticht, present-day Dutch province of Overijssel. The Oversticht was occupied by the duke of Gelderland and was conquered by the Habsburgs. At some point in time—it is unknown when or why—he fell out with the local Habsburg-Burgundian authorities, was exiled, and lost his property. Van Batenburg thenceforth regarded the Holy Roman Emperor as his mortal enemy.

During the early 1530s, Van Batenburg converted to Anabaptism and found himself the leader of a large number of his co-religionists in Friesland and Groningen. His sympathies originally lay with the revolutionary Anabaptists who held Münster during the Münster Rebellion, but between Easter and Pentecost 1535, the Batenburgers from Groningen urged him to declare himself as 'a new David'. Before long Van Batenburg had established a new and completely independent sect, which quickly became the most extreme of all the early Anabaptist movements.

== Bocholt meeting ==
In August 1536, the leaders of the various Anabaptist groups met in Bocholt in a final attempt to maintain the unity of Anabaptism. At this meeting, the major areas of dispute between the sects were polygamous marriage and the use of force against non-believers. David Joris tried to compromise by declaring the time had not yet come to fight against the authorities, and that it would be unwise to kill any 'infidel' (non-Anabaptists), lest the Anabaptists themselves be seen as common thieves and killers. Accounts of the outcome of the meeting differ; however, Joris and his followers subsequently split from the other Anabaptist groupings.

Van Batenburg, correctly suspecting that his fervent belief in both polygamy and the use of force would be condemned by other Anabaptist leaders, had stayed away from the conference at Bocholt, although he had sent representatives. He was disgusted by Joris' propositions, called him 'the son of a whore' and threatened to kill him. The rivalry between the two Anabaptist leaders would last until Van Batenburg's death.

== Beliefs ==
Comparatively little is known of Van Batenburg's theology. The Batenburgers believed that every man, and everything on earth, was owned, in a literal sense, by God. They also believed that they were God's chosen children. It followed, in their theology, that everything on earth was theirs to do with as they pleased. There was nothing wrong in making a living by robbing 'infidels', by which they meant any man who was not a member of their sect; indeed killing infidels was pleasing to their God. Those who joined the sect after 1535 — when the Münsterite leadership had declared the door to salvation to be closed—could never be baptised, they thought, but these men and women would nevertheless survive the coming apocalypse and be reborn in the coming Kingdom of God as servants of the Anabaptist elite. The Batenburgers also shared the views of the radical Münsterites on polygamy and property; all women, and all goods, were held in common. A few Batenburger marriages did occur, and Van Batenburg himself retained the right to present a deserving member of his sect with a 'wife' from the group's general stock of women. But such unions could be ended just as readily, and on occasion the prophet did order an unwilling wife to return to servicing the remainder of the Batenburger men.

== Leadership ==
Jan van Batenburg seems to have commanded the loyalty of at least several hundred men. Members of his sect were required to swear oaths of absolute secrecy, however, and had to endure a painful initiation designed to ensure they would be able to resist torture if they were ever captured, so the true extent of his following never emerged. The Batenburgers did not gather openly in public, and had their leader's dispensation to pose as ordinary Lutherans or Catholics, going to church and living apparently normal lives in the lands along the borders of the Holy Roman Empire and the Netherlands for several years after the fall of Münster. They recognised one another by secret symbols displayed on their houses or their clothing, and by certain ways of styling their hair. It was only after Van Batenburg himself was captured and burned at the stake, at Vilvoorde, Brabant, in 1538, that they came together at last, transforming themselves into a robber-band and infesting the Imperial marches for at least another decade under the leadership of a Leyden weaver called Cornelis Appelman. By this point the group had been reduced to a core of no more than 200 men, most of whom were joined by bonds of family or marriage.

Appelman remained active until his own capture in 1545. He was considered more extreme than Van Batenburg, giving himself the title of 'The Judge' and killing any of his followers who refused to join his criminal activities, or proved themselves lax in killing, robbing or committing arson. Like Van Batenburg, he preached and practised polygamy, with the additional refinement that the women of his sect could leave their husbands at any time should they decide to marry a man further up the Batenburger hierarchy. Appelman himself murdered his own wife when she refused him permission to marry her daughter, and subsequently killed the girl as well.

== Closing stages ==
After The Judge's death, the Batenburger sect fragmented into several tiny groups, one of which, the Children of Emlichheim, was active in the middle 1550s. Its sole creed appears to have been revenge against the infidel; on one notorious occasion its members stabbed to death 125 cows that belonged to a local monastery. The last of the Batenburger splinter groups, and also the largest, was the 'Folk of Johan Willemsz'. This sect persisted until about 1580, living by robbery and murder in the countryside around Wesel. When Willemsz himself was burned at the stake, the remnants of the group fled west. A remnant is believed to have found their way to Friesland, where they hid themselves among the local Mennonite community and were eventually absorbed into it.
