= Bernhard Krechting =

German Anabaptist leader (pre-1500–1536)

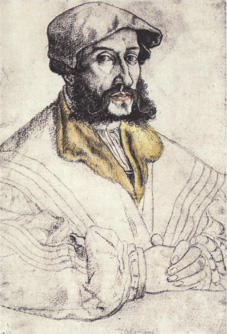
Bernd Krechting

Bernhard Krechting (before 1500 – January 22, 1536) was one of the leaders of the Anabaptist Kingdom of Münster.

Krechting was born in Schöppingen, Münster, the son of the town clerk and church musician Engelbert Krechting. Like his five brothers, he received higher education. He became a priest, a tutor for the Earl in Bentheim and a pastor at Gildehaus in the county of Bentheim. However, when he proclaimed Anabaptist teachings, he was removed from his position. With many that he had convinced, he and his brother Heinrich Krechting moved to Westphalian Münster (the so-called "New Jerusalem"), where he was one of the Anabaptist preachers. In the court of John of Leiden, he served on the council with his brother Heinrich, the Chancellor of the Anabaptist kingdom. Heinrich, however, escaped capture, while Bernhard Krechting suffered an agonizing end.

On 22 January 1536, he was tortured to death with John of Leiden and Bernhard Knipperdolling at the principal market in Munster. As a deterrent to those who opposed the Catholic Church, their bodies were placed in three iron cages hung from the tower of St. Lambert's Church. Although the bodies were removed about 50 years later the cages have remained into the 21st century.

== See also ==
- Münster Rebellion
