= Jan Matthys =

Dutch Anabaptist leader (c. 1500–1534)

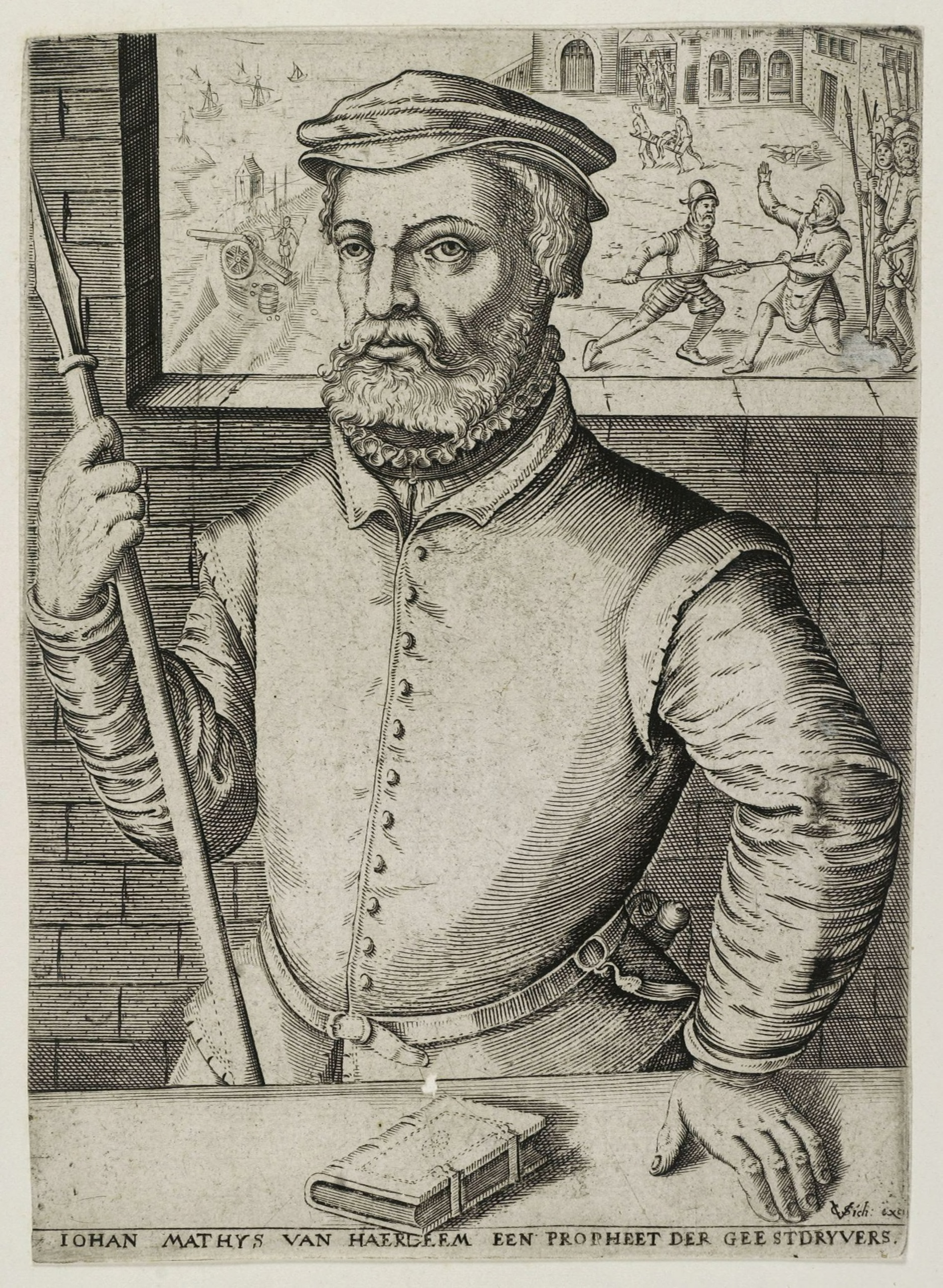
Jan Matthys

Jan Matthys (also known as Jan Matthias, Johann Mathyszoon, Jan Mattijs, Jan Matthijszoon; c. 1500 – 5 April 1534) was a charismatic Anabaptist leader of the Münster Rebellion, regarded by his followers as a prophet.

Matthys was born in Haarlem, in the Holy Roman Empire's County of Holland, where he worked as a baker, and was converted to Anabaptism through the ministry of Melchior Hoffman in the 1520s. Matthys baptized thousands of converts, and after Hoffman's imprisonment, rose to prominent leadership among the Anabaptists. Matthys rejected the pacifism and non-violence theology of Hoffman, adopting a view that oppression must be met with resistance.

In 1534, an Anabaptist insurrection took control of Münster, the capital city of the Holy Roman Empire's Prince-Bishopric of Münster. John of Leiden, a Dutch Anabaptist disciple of Matthys, and a group of local merchants summoned Matthys to come to the city. Matthys identified Münster as the "New Jerusalem", and on January 5, 1534, a number of his disciples entered the city and introduced adult baptism. Reformer Bernhard Rothmann apparently accepted "rebaptism" that day, and well over 1,000 adults were soon baptized.

They declared war on Franz von Waldeck, its expelled prince-bishop, who besieged the fortified town of Münster. On Easter Sunday in April 1534, Matthys confidently walked out of Münster. He was cut off with his entire band, and he was killed, dismembered, and his head stuck on a pike. Later that evening, his genitals were nailed to the city door.

== Notes ==
- Jan Matthijsz van Haarlem (d. 1534) at Global Anabaptist Mennonite Encyclopedia Online
