= John of Leiden =

Dutch Anabaptist leader (1509–1536)

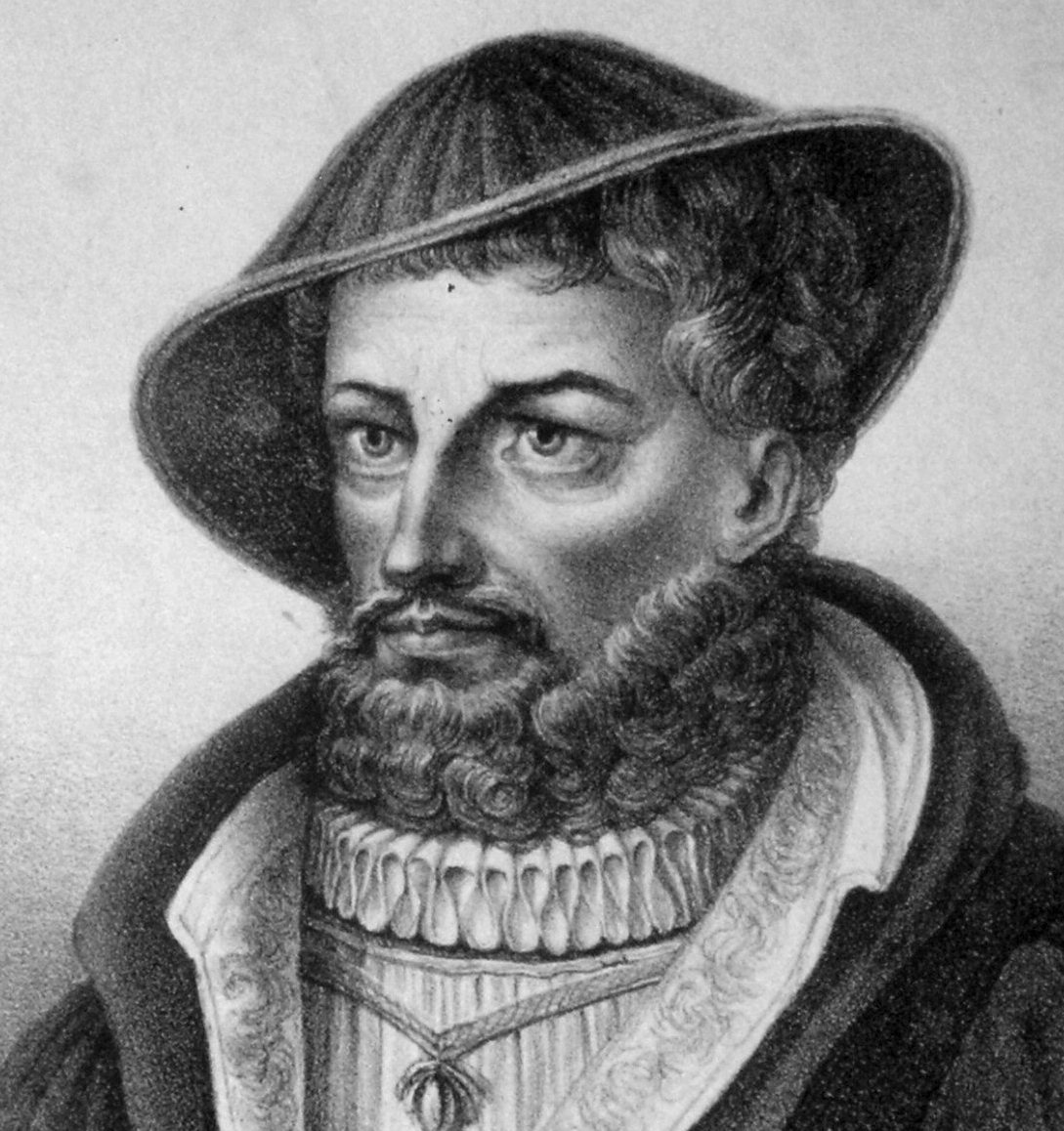

Anabaptist King of Münster
- Reign: 8 September 1534 – 24 June 1535
- Deputies: Chancellor; Heinrich Krechting; Lieutenant; Bernhard Krechting; Stadtholder; Bernhard Knipperdolling
- Born: Johan Beukelszoon; 2 February 1509; Zevenhoven, County of Holland, Habsburg Netherlands
- Died: 22 January 1536 (aged 26); Prinzipalmarkt, Münster, Prince-Bishopric of Münster
- Spouse: Divara van Haarlem; Elisabeth Wandscherer
- Occupations: Tailor, merchant, innkeeper
- Known for: Role in the Münster rebellion

John of Leiden (born Johan Beukelszoon; 2 February 1509 – 22 January 1536) was a Dutch Anabaptist leader. In 1533 he moved to Münster, capital of the Prince-Bishopric of Münster, where he became an influential prophet, turned the city into a millenarian Anabaptist theocracy, and proclaimed himself King of New Jerusalem in September 1534. The insurrection was suppressed in June 1535 after Prince-Bishop Franz von Waldeck besieged the city and captured John. John was tortured to death in the city's central marketplace on 22 January 1536, along with Bernhard Knipperdolling and Bernhard Krechting.

== Life ==
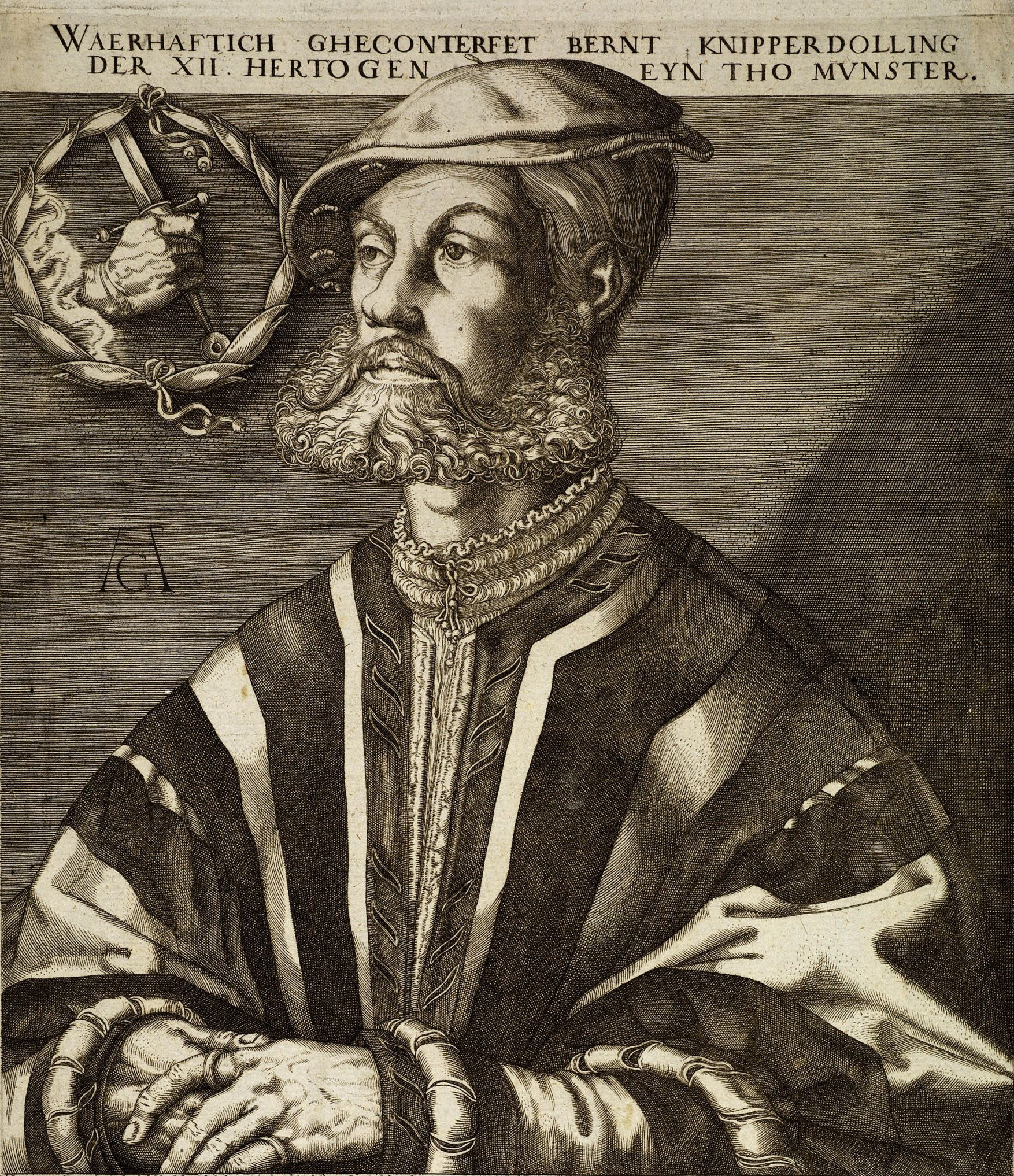
Vice-king and executioner Bernhard Knipperdolling

John was the illegitimate son of a Dutch mayor, and a tailor's apprentice by trade. He was born in the village of Zevenhoven in the municipality of Nieuwkoop, located in the Dutch province of South Holland. Raised in poverty, young John became a charismatic leader who was widely revered by his followers. John was an Anabaptist, secretly at first, but later he became a recognized prophet of a sect which would eventually take over the German town of Münster. According to his own testimony, he moved to Münster in 1533 because he had heard there were inspired preachers there. He sent for Jan Matthys, who had baptized him, to come.

After his arrival, Matthys - recognized as a prophet - became the principal leader of the city. Matthys expelled all of the Catholics from the city shortly after his arrival and set up a communal structure based on the Gospels. He outlawed money and forbade owning property. A Catholic-supported army, led by Franz von Waldeck, Prince-Bishop of Münster, Osnabrück and Minden, laid siege to the town of Münster after the Anabaptist takeover. Matthys led an assault on the siege on Easter Sunday 1534, but he was executed and died quickly. John of Leiden became a self-proclaimed "King of New Jerusalem" until its fall in June 1535.

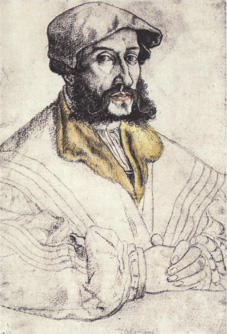
Anabaptist "chancellor" Bernhard Krechting

John of Leiden would lead the Anabaptists during the siege. When he was the leader, he assumed Matthys' position as the prophet and eventually established a Royal Order complete with a Royal Court and a kingly costume, which was made from the property taken from the citizens of Münster. John of Leiden would make many promises to his starving subjects about salvation from the siege and upcoming rewards for their enduring loyalty. This, along with his charisma, kept his position in the city secure until the eventual defeat by the hands of the prince bishop. His motto was: "Gottes macht is myn cracht" (God's might is my strength).

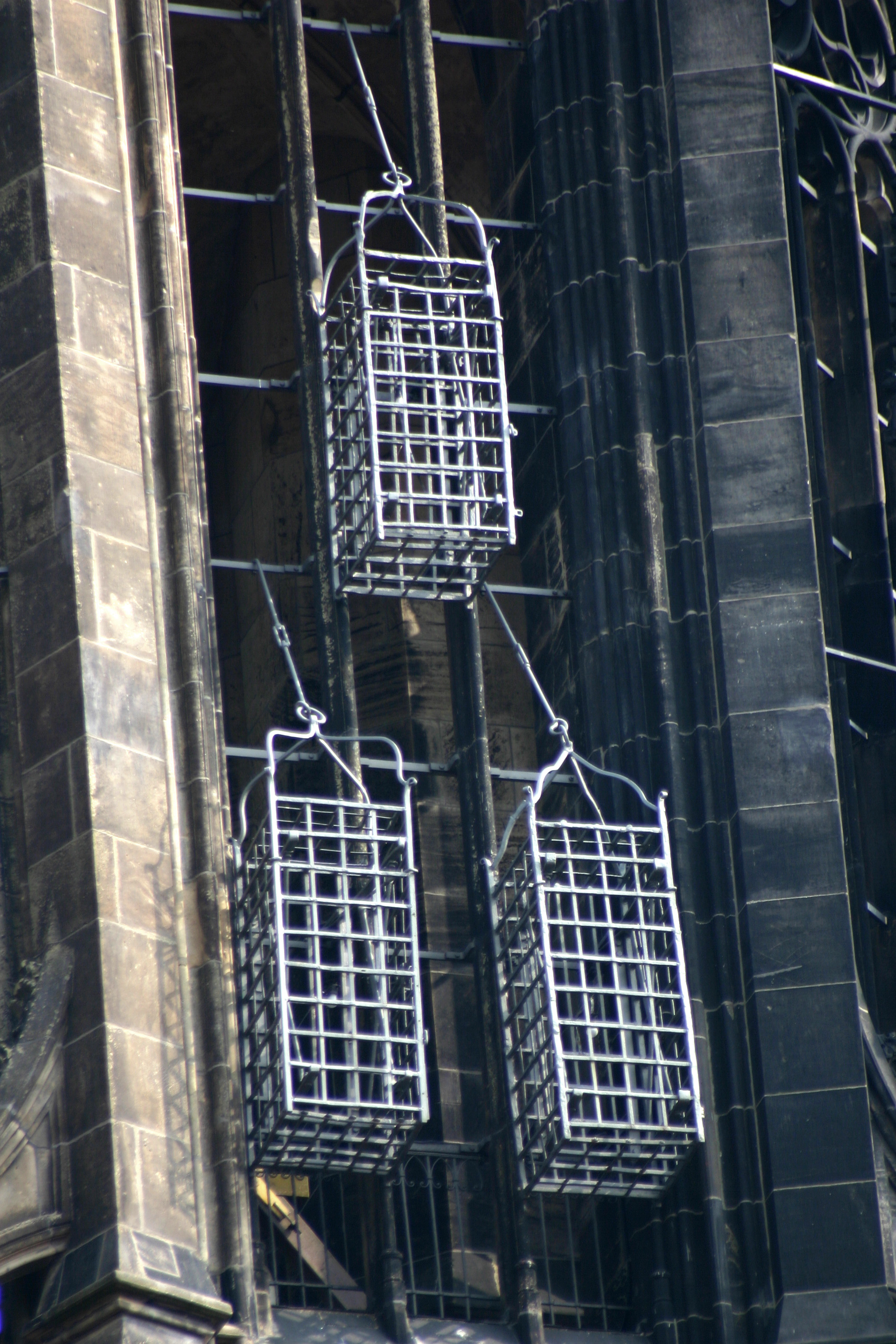
Gibbets that held the corpses of the leaders of the Münster Rebellion at the steeple of St. Lambert's Church.

The army of Münster was defeated in 1535 by the prince-bishop Franz von Waldeck. John of Leiden was captured. He was found in the cellar of a house, from where he was taken to a dungeon in Dülmen, then brought back to Münster. On 22 January 1536, along with Bernhard Krechting and Bernhard Knipperdolling, after being convicted according to the Constitutio Criminalis Carolina, he was tortured and then executed. Each of the three was attached to a pole by an iron spiked collar and his body ripped with red-hot tongs for the space of an hour.

After Knipperdolling saw the process of torturing John of Leiden, he attempted to kill himself with the collar, using it to choke himself. After that, the executioner tied him to the stake to make it impossible for him to kill himself. After the burning, their tongues were pulled out with tongs before each was killed with a burning dagger thrust through the heart. The bodies were placed in three iron baskets and hung from the steeple of St. Lambert's Church and the remains left to rot. About fifty years later the bones were removed, but the baskets remain.

== Historiography ==
The conventional view is that John of Leiden set up in Münster a polygamous theocracy, best known for a law John passed stating that any unmarried woman must accept the first proposal of marriage made to her, with the result that men competed to acquire the most wives. Some sources report that John himself took sixteen wives aside from his "Queen" Divara van Haarlem, and that he publicly beheaded one of his wives, Elisabeth Wandscherer, after she rebelled against his authority.

Karl Kautsky in his Communism in Central Europe at the Time of the Reformation, notes that this picture of Anabaptist Münster is based almost entirely on accounts written by the Anabaptists' enemies, who sought to justify their bloody reconquest of the city. Kautsky's reading of the sources emphasizes the Anabaptists' emphasis on social equality, political democracy, and communal living during the time of John's nominal rule.

== In proverb, on stage and in fiction ==
- John's name still lives on in the Dutch language, in the saying zich met een Jan(tje) van Leiden van iets afmaken (loosely: To pull a John of Leiden), which means not putting too much effort (or any effort) into something.
- John Leiden features in Thomas Nashe's The Unfortunate Traveller (1594), whose hero, Jack Wilton, satirically describes the siege of Münster and Leiden's death.
- The opera Le prophète (1849) by Giacomo Meyerbeer features John as its hero. It involves the capture of Münster (Acts III and IV), John's coronation as God's elect at the cathedral (Act IV), and its finale is set in John's palace in Münster.
- John appears as a proxy for Hitler in Friedrich Reck-Malleczewen’s 1937 anti-Nazi novel, Bockelson: Geschichte eines Massenwahns ("Bockelson: A Tale of a Mass Insanity").
- John of Leiden is featured in the 1962 Peter Vansittart novel published as The Siege in USA and as Friends of God in the U.K.
- John (as Jan Bockelson) is one of the main protagonists in the 1967 play Die Wiedertäufer by Friedrich Dürrenmatt, and in the 1985 opera Behold the Sun by Alexander Goehr.
- John of Leiden appears in the novel L'Œuvre au noir or The Abyss by Marguerite Yourcenar, from 1968, in which Yourcenar blends fictitious and real characters, describing the whole Münster Rebellion and its downfall. The passage occupies a short chapter.
- The 1993 German TV drama A King for Burning about Leiden features Christoph Waltz as Jan Beuckelszoon and Mario Adorf as Bishop von Waldeck.
- John is also featured in Luther Blissett's novel, Q.
- John (Jan) of Leiden is the central character in Anita Mason's 2003 novel Perfection.
- John is a central character in Antonio Orejudo's 2005 novel, "Reconstruction"
- John is a central character in Jonathon Rainbow's 2010 novel, Speak to Her Kindly, a novel of historical fiction set during the events of the Munster Rebellion.
- The protagonist of Richard Powers's 2014 novel Orfeo composes an opera with John of Leiden as the main character.
- The opera 'J.S. Bach - the Apocalypse' (2022) by OPERA2DAY and the Nederlandse Bachvereniging about the stages of radicalization is based on the life of John.
- He was one of the leading characters in The Golden City, a 1974 award-winning immersive drama written and performed by Strathclyde Theatre Group in Glasgow Cathedral and St Mary's Cathedral, Edinburgh (Episcopal) during the Edinburgh Festival Fringe.
