= Franz von Waldeck =

Roman Catholic Prince-Bishop

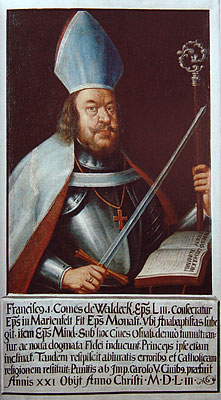
Franz von Waldeck

Count Franz von Waldeck (1491 – 15 July 1553) was Prince-Bishop of Münster, Osnabrück, and Minden in the Lower Rhenish–Westphalian Circle of the Holy Roman Empire. He suppressed the Münster Rebellion, a millenarian Anabaptist theocratic insurrection which occupied the fortified city of Münster.

== Biography ==
Franz was the son of Count Philip II of Waldeck-Eisenberg (1453–1524), who while being originally destined for the ministry, took a greater interest in his family's more worldly duties and thus became governor of the County of Ravensberg. His mother was the Countess Catherine von Solms-Lich (1467–1492), daughter of Count Kuno von Solms-Lich and Countess Walpurgis von Dhaun. Franz was the third and last son of six children of Count Phillip and Countess Catherine. A year after Franz's birth, his mother died.

Franz von Waldeck was early on destined to fulfill his father's original ambition for a place in the aristocratic cathedral chapter. Because chapter members were required to obtain a secular law degree, Franz began studying in Erfurt in 1506 and moved to Leipzig in 1510. Without having received sacred orders, he did receive numerous "Kanonikerpräbenden". Franz was, among other things, a canon in Cologne, Trier, Mainz and Paderborn, as well as dean of St. Alexander's Foundation in Einbeck.

Franz von Waldeck's attitude towards the Reformation was ambiguous. In the early 1530s, the city of Münster embraced the Reformation, but soon fell under the control of the radical Bernhard Rothmann. Von Waldeck took action against the city, including the confiscation of goods owned by city merchants. In February 1533, both sides settled their differences with the Treaty of Dülmen. Von Waldeck conceded full religious freedom to the city.

When the Lutheran movement gave way to the radical Anabaptists in the annual council election on 23 February 1534, Waldeck besieged the city. On Easter Sunday, 1534, Anabaptist leader Jan Matthys led a small band out of the city and was defeated and killed. John of Leiden then installed himself as king of the city of New Jerusalem (Münster). During the following siege, Hille Feicken attempted to murder him by the example of Judith and Holophernes. With the help of the Holy Roman Empire and a traitor from within, Waldeck's troops took the city back on 24 June 1535.

Münster was re-Catholicised, and Waldeck used his influence to further the teachings of Luther. His Reformation efforts in 1541 met with unified resistance in the Bishopric of Münster. In 1543 in Osnabrück, together with Lübeck Superintendent Herman Bonnus, Waldeck planned to introduce the Reformation. In Minden, where the Lutheran doctrine had been widely accepted even before he took office, Franz attempted in 1535 to reach out to the balance of the city beyond just the cathedral chapter. These efforts at aiding the Reformation were closely linked to his desire to have his relationship with Anna Polmann legalized and to have the three dioceses of Münster, Osnabrück, and Minden secularized, in order to create a secular territory for his heirs.

== Marriage and issue ==
In Einbeck, Waldeck met Anna Polmann (1505–1557), the daughter of local linen weaver Barthold Polmann. They lived in a marriage-like relationship, having eight children: four sons and four daughters. Whether or not the couple entered into a proper marriage is unclear. Their children were:

- Franz von Waldeck, Jr. (1524–?), who became a clergyman
- Barthold von Waldeck (1536–?), a clergyman
- Phillipp von Waldeck (1538–1605), a clergyman
- Elisabeth Catherina von Waldeck (1540–1579), married Wernerus Crispinus (1535–1604)
- Johanna von Waldeck (1540–1572)
- Ermegard von Waldeck (1542–?)
- Christoph von Waldeck (1543–1587), married Agnes Pagenstecher (1545–1606)
- Katherina von Waldeck (1544–1597).

Francis of Waldeck House of Waldeck Born: 1491 on Sparrenberg Castle Died: 15 July 1553 in Wolbeck (a part of today's Münster)
Regnal titles
Catholic Church titles
Preceded by Francis I of Brunswick-Wolfenbüttel	Prince-Bishop of Minden as Francis II; 1530–1553	Succeeded by Julius of Brunswick-Wolfenbüttel
Preceded by Eric III of Brunswick-Grubenhagen	Prince-Bishop of Münster as Francis I 1532–1553	Succeeded by William II Ketteler
Preceded by Eric III of Brunswick-Grubenhagen	Prince-Bishop of Osnabrück as Francis; 1532–1553	Succeeded by John IV
