= Münster rebellion =

16th-century political rebellion in Germany

Anabaptist Dominion of Münster Täuferreich von Münster
- 1534–1535
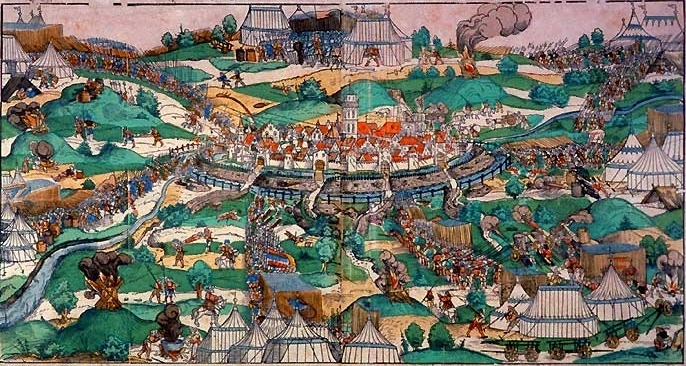
- The city of Münster under siege by prince bishop Franz von Waldeck in 1534. The picture shows the first attack at Pentecost.
- Capital: Münster
- Religion: Christianity (Anabaptism)
- Government: Communal theocratic monarchy
- King
  - 1534-1535: John of Leiden
- Historical era: Protestant Reformation
  - Established: February 1534
  - Disestablished: June 24, 1535
Preceded by	Succeeded by
Prince-Bishopric of Münster	Prince-Bishopric of Münster
- Today part of: Münster, North Rhine-Westphalia, Germany

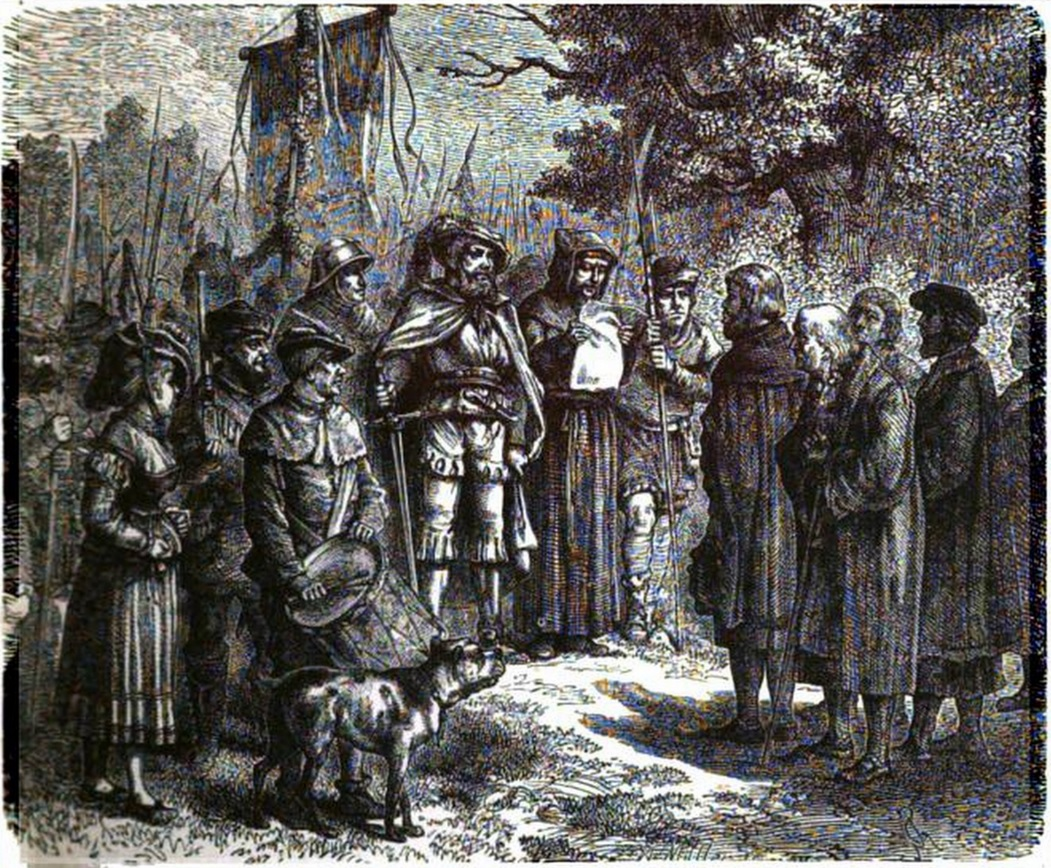
Captured citizens brought before an Anabaptist leader during the Münster rebellion.

The Münster rebellion (German: Täuferreich von Münster, lit. 'Anabaptist dominion of Münster') was an attempt by radical Anabaptists to establish a communal sectarian government in the German city of Münster – then under the large Prince-Bishopric of Münster in the Holy Roman Empire.

The city was under Anabaptist rule from February 1534, when the city hall was seized and Bernhard Knipperdolling installed as mayor, until its fall in June 1535. It was Melchior Hoffman, who initiated adult baptism in Strasbourg in 1530, and his line of eschatological Anabaptism, that helped lay the foundations for the events of 1534–35 in Münster.

== Rebellion ==
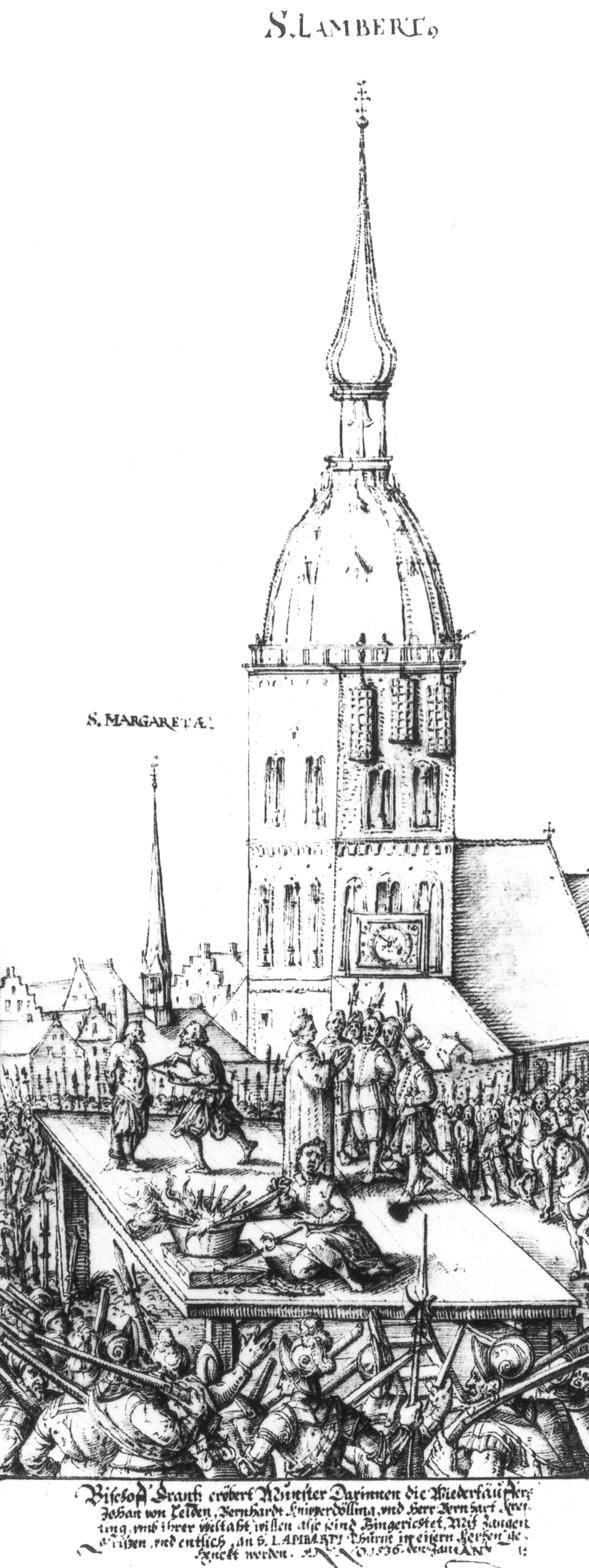
Historical drawing of the execution of the leaders of the rebellion. In the background the cages are already in place at the old steeple of St. Lambert's Church.

After the German Peasants' War (1524–1525), a forceful attempt to establish theocracy was made at Münster, in Westphalia (1532–1535). Here the Anabaptists had gained considerable influence, through the adhesion of Bernhard Rothmann, the Lutheran pastor, and several prominent citizens and leaders, including Jan Matthys (also spelled Matthijs, Mathijsz, Matthyssen, Mathyszoon), a baker from Haarlem, and John of Leiden (Jan van Bockelson or Beukelszoon), a tailor from Leiden. Bernhard Rothmann was a tireless and vitriolic opponent of Catholicism and a writer of pamphlets that were published by his ally, the wealthy wool merchant Bernhard Knipperdolling. The pamphlets at first denounced Catholicism from a radical Lutheran perspective, but soon started to proclaim that the Bible called for the absolute equality of man in all matters, including the distribution of wealth. The pamphlets, which were distributed throughout northern Germany, called upon the poor of the region to join the citizens of Münster to share the wealth of the town and benefit spiritually from being the elect of Heaven.

With so many Anabaptist adherents in the town, Rothmann and his allies had little difficulty obtaining possession of it at the elections for the magistracy and placing Bernhard Knipperdolling as the mayor, after deposing the mainly Lutheran magistrates, who, until then, had seen him as an ally in their own distrust of, and dislike for, Catholics. Matthys was a follower of Melchior Hoffman, and after Hoffman's imprisonment at Strasbourg Matthys obtained a considerable following in the Low Countries, including Bockelson, who became known as John of Leiden. John of Leiden and Gerrit Boekbinder had visited Münster, and returned with a report that Bernhard Rothmann was in Münster teaching doctrines similar to their own. Matthys identified Münster as the "New Jerusalem", and on January 5, 1534, a number of his disciples entered the city and introduced adult baptism. Rothmann apparently accepted "rebaptism" that day, and well over 1000 adults were soon baptised. Vigorous preparations were made not only to hold what had been gained but to spread their beliefs to other areas. The many Lutherans who left were outnumbered by the arriving Anabaptists. There was a wave of iconoclasm in cathedrals and monasteries, and rebaptism became compulsory. The property of emigrants was shared out with the poor, and soon a proclamation was issued that all property was to be held in common.

== Siege ==
The city was besieged by Franz von Waldeck, its expelled bishop. In April 1534, on Easter Sunday, Matthys, who had prophesied God's judgment to come on the wicked on that day, led a procession from the city with twelve followers, as he believed himself the second Gideon. He and his followers were cut off and taken. After Matthys was killed his head was placed on a pole for all in the city to see, and his genitals later nailed to the city gate.

The 25-year-old John of Leiden was subsequently recognized as Matthys' religious and political successor, justifying his authority and actions by claiming visions from heaven. His authority grew until eventually he proclaimed himself the successor of David and adopted royal regalia, honors, and absolute power in the new "Zion". There were now in the town at least three times as many women of marriageable age as men, so he made polygamy compulsory, and he himself took sixteen wives. (John is said to have beheaded Elisabeth Wandscherer in the marketplace for refusing to marry him, though this act might have been falsely attributed to him after his death.) Meanwhile, most of the residents of Münster were starving as a result of the year-long siege. A number of non-combatants were allowed to leave the city by John of Leiden, but some women were gang-raped by the bishop's army.

After lengthy resistance, the city was taken by the besiegers on June 24, 1535. John of Leiden and several other prominent Anabaptist leaders were captured and imprisoned. In January 1536, John of Leiden, Bernhard Knipperdolling and one more prominent follower, Bernhard Krechting, were tortured and executed in the marketplace of Münster. Their bodies were exhibited in cages which hung from the steeple of St. Lambert's Church. The bones were removed later, but the cages hang there still.

According to a contemporary source, about 3,000 people died during the siege.

== Aftermath ==
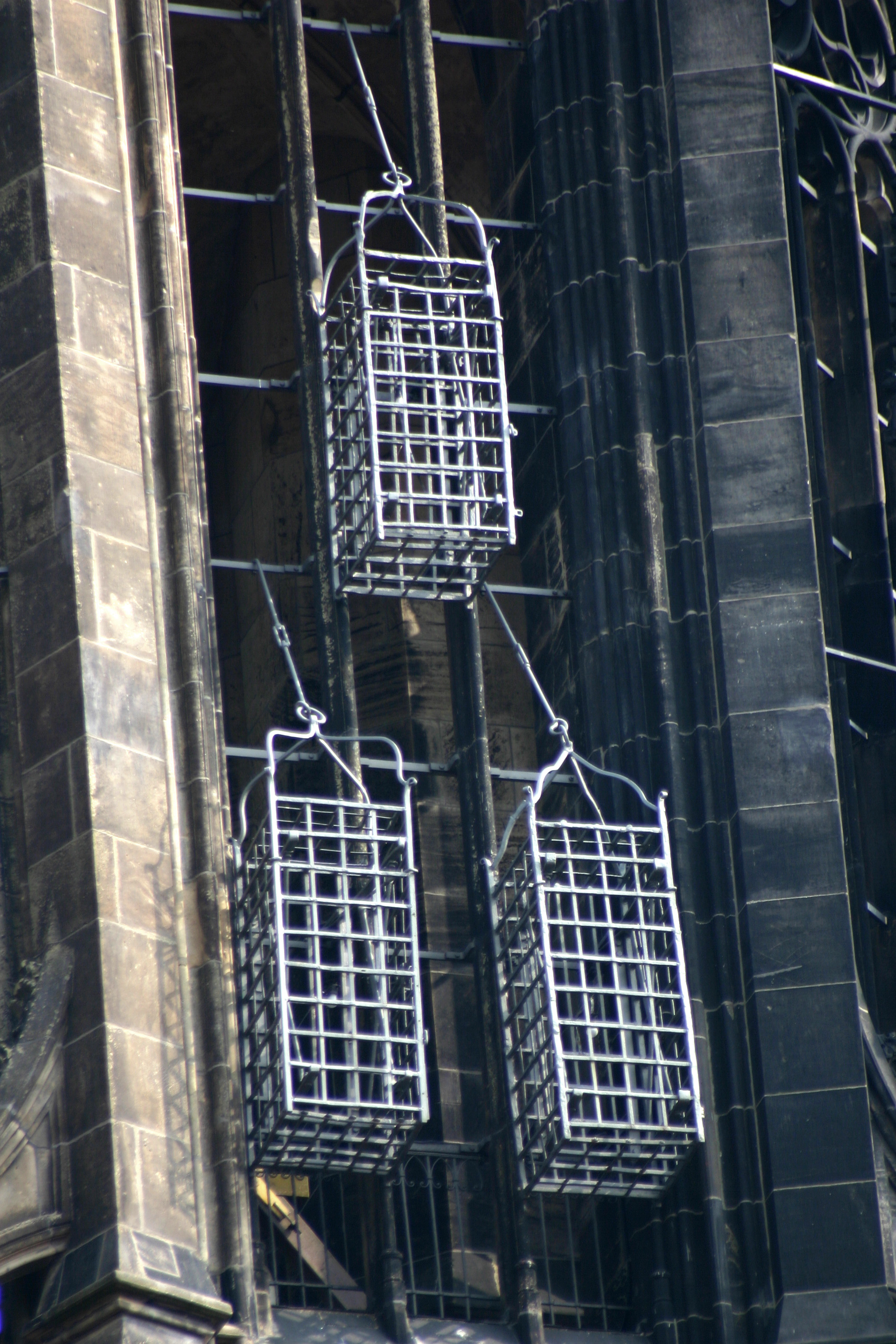
Cages of the leaders of the Münster Rebellion at the steeple of St. Lambert's Church.

The Münster Rebellion was a turning point for the Anabaptist movement. It never again had the opportunity of assuming political importance, as both Catholic and Lutheran civil powers adopted stringent measures to counter this. It is difficult to trace the subsequent history of the group as a religious body, through changes in the names used and beliefs held.

The Batenburgers under Jan van Batenburg preserved the violent millennialist stream of Anabaptism seen at Münster. They were polygamous and believed force was justified against anyone not in their sect. Their movement went underground after the suppression of the Münster Rebellion, with members posing as Catholics or Lutherans as necessary. Some nonresistant Anabaptists found leaders in Menno Simons and the brothers Obbe and Dirk Philips, Dutch Anabaptist leaders who repudiated the distinctive doctrines of the Münster Anabaptists. This group eventually became known as the Mennonites after Simons. They rejected any use of violence and preached a faith based on compassion and loving one's enemies.

In August 1536, the leaders of Anabaptist groups influenced by Melchior Hoffman met in Bocholt in an attempt to maintain unity. The meeting included followers of Batenburg, survivors of Münster, David Joris and his sympathisers, and the nonresistant Anabaptists. At this meeting, the major areas of dispute between the sects were polygamous marriage and the use of force against non-believers. Joris proposed compromise by declaring the time had not yet come to fight against the authorities, and that it would be unwise to kill any non-Anabaptists. The gathered Anabaptists agreed to the compromise of no more force, but the meeting did not prevent the fragmentation of Anabaptism.

== Works of fiction ==
- The Unfortunate Traveller (1594), first English picaresque novel by Thomas Nashe, reflects the cruelty issued by the Emperor and the Duke of Saxony
- A Tale of a Tub (1704) by Jonathan Swift. His first major work, brother "Jack" is based on "Jack of Leyden".
- Le prophète (1849), opera by Giacomo Meyerbeer that highly fictionalizes the rebellion
- The Friends of God (1963) by Peter Vansittart
- The Abyss (French: L'Œuvre au noir) (1968) by Marguerite Yourcenar
- Rules For a Film about Anabaptists (1976), film by Georg Brintrup
- Die Wiedertäufer (The Anabaptists) (1980), play by Friedrich Dürrenmatt, translated by Lauren Friesen as The Anabaptists (unpublished manuscripts in various libraries, including the Graduate Theological Union)
- König der letzten Tage (King of the Last Days) (1993), German historical mini-series that portrays the events of the Münster Rebellion
- In Nomine Dei (In God's Name) (1993), play by José Saramago
- Divara – Wasser und Blut (Divara, Water and Blood) (1993), German-language opera by Azio Corghi to a libretto by the composer after the play by Saramago
- The Garden of Earthly Delights (1994) by Nicholas Salaman, named after the painting by Hieronymus Bosch
- Q (1999) by Luther Blissett
- Speak to Her Kindly: A Novel of the Anabaptists (2003) by Jonathan Rainbow
- Perfection (2003) by Anita Mason
- Orfeo (2014), novel by Richard Powers, whose main character composes an opera retelling the story
- J.S. Bach - The Apocalypse (2021), German-language opera with music by Johann Sebastian Bach and Panos Iliopoulos, and libretto by Thomas Höft. This work, presented as an opera that Bach had never written, was created by the Netherlands Bach Society to inspire new generations to take an interest in the music of Bach.
- Az idők jelei (2022), a novel by Zsuzsa Rakovszky
- De heligas stad (2025), a novel by Steve Sem-Sandberg
