= Witmarsum =

Witmarsum may refer to:

- Witmarsum, Friesland, a small village in the Netherlands
- Witmarsum, Santa Catarina, a municipality in Brazil
- Witmarsum Colony, a Mennonite settlement in Palmeira, Paraná, Brazil
