= Anneke Esaiasdochter =

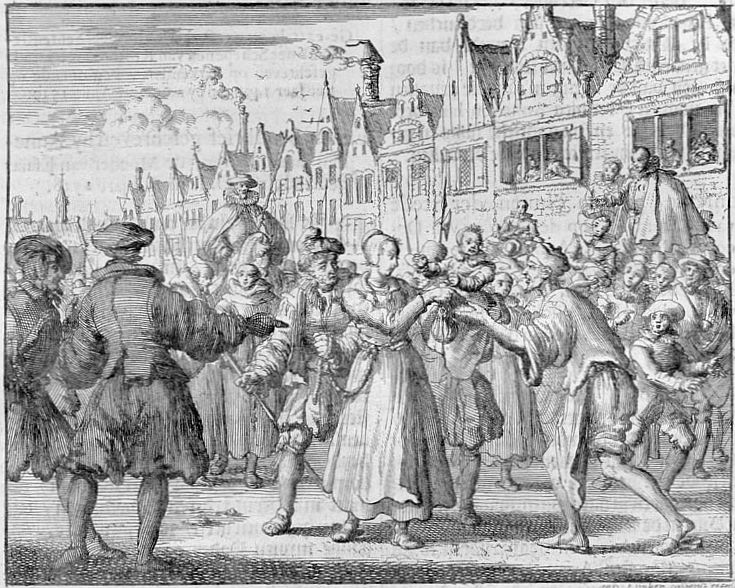
Anna Jansz on the way to her execution, supposedly giving away her child, etching by Jan Luiken from the Martyrs Mirror, 1685

Anneke Esaiasdochter (née Jansz or Jans; also known as Anneke van Rotterdam; 1509–1539), was a Dutch Anabaptist executed as a heretic and at the time regarded as a Protestant martyr.

== Life ==
Anna Jansz was born in Brielle on the Dutch island of Putten Voorne-Putten in 1509 or 1510. She was executed for heresy by drowning because of her connection to David Joris on 24 January 1539. She is the subject of poems, a novel and was regarded in the propaganda as a Protestant martyr. A description of her martyrdom is the basis of song number 18 of the Ausbund. In the time of the Münster Rebellion between 1534 and 1536, she wrote the Trumpet Song (Ick hoorde de Basuyne blasen), a song influenced by the apocalyptic revolutionary spirit of the Dutch Anabaptist movement of the time, inspired by the writings of Bernhard Rothmann. The Trumpet Song was published for the first time in Een Geesteliick Liedt-Boecken by David Joris in 1539. She is the author of a "spiritual will", which was published in 1562.
