= Obbe Philips =

Obbe Philips (ca. 1500–1568) (also spelled Philipsz and Filips) was one of the early founders of Dutch Anabaptism. He was the illegitimate son of a Roman Catholic priest from Leeuwarden. Philips studied medicine, and became a barber and a surgeon. He married in 1530 and set up his business in Leeuwarden.

Obbe Philips became interested in the Reformation, and converted to Anabaptism late in 1533. He was probably baptized by Bartholomeus Boekbinder or Willem de Kuyper, emissaries of Jan Matthys. Menno Simons was ordained around 1537 by Obbe Philips, and was probably baptized earlier by Philips also. Obbe also ordained his brother, Dirk Philips, and baptized David Joris. Obbe and Dirk were among the peaceful disciples of Melchior Hoffman (the more radical having set up the kingdom in Münster), and as early as 1534 were preaching against establishing God's kingdom by force. Hoffman introduced the first self-sustaining Anabaptism to the Netherlands, when he taught and practiced believers' baptism in Emden in East Frisia.

Obbe led the Dutch Anabaptists until around 1540, but lost faith in the Anabaptist way and withdrew from the church. Around 1560, Philips wrote his Confession: Recollections of the Years 1533–1536, which was published after his death by Cornelius Claesz. In it he wrote, "I am still miserable of heart today, that I...was so shamefully and miserably deceived...I did not stop forthwith but permitted myself to bring poor souls to this—that I through the importuning of the brethren, commissioned to the office: Dietrich Philips in Amsterdam; David Joris in Delft; and Menno Simons in Groningen...It is this which is utter grief to my heart, and which I will lament before my God as long as I live..." He was dubbed a Demas by Menno (after the disciple Demas, who forsook the Apostle Paul). In his Confession he spoke harshly against revolutionaries and false prophets, but not against the peaceful Anabaptists such as followed Menno. His last years remain a mystery, but probably held as an individual a "spiritualist" belief similar to Anabaptism. He died in 1568.

The Anabaptists who would become known as Mennonites were originally called Obbenites or Obbenists. W. J. Kühler, in Geschiedenis I (1932), concluded that "in Obbe the brotherhood certainly lost its most appealing leader."
