= Districts and neighbourhoods of Brielle =

The Dutch former municipality of Brielle is divided into districts and neighbourhoods for statistical purposes. The former municipality is divided into the following statistical districts:

- District 00 Brielle (CBS-neighbourhood code:050100)
- District 01 Vierpolders (CBS-neighbourhood code:050101)
- District 02 Zwartewaal (CBS-neighbourhood code:050102)
- District 03 Recreatiestrook Brielse Maas (CBS-neighbourhood code:050103)

A statistical district may consist of several neighbourhoods. The table below shows the neighbourhood division with characteristic values according to the Statistics Netherlands (CBS, 2008):

CBS-neighbourhood code	Neighbourhood name	Population	Area total (ha)	Area land (ha)	Position
BU05010000	Brielle centrum	2820	99	77	Location in the municipality
BU05010001	Plantage en Ommeloop	780	29	27	Location in the municipality
BU05010002	Zuurland	1820	40	40	Location in the municipality
BU05010003	Rugge	2620	59	58	Location in the municipality
BU05010004	Meeuwenoord	520	82	46	Location in the municipality
BU05010005	Kleine Goote	1770	21	21	Location in the municipality
BU05010006	Nieuwland	1490	54	54	Location in the municipality
BU05010009	Verspreide huizen	230	508	454	Location in the municipality
BU05010100	Vierpolders	1280	112	112	Location in the municipality
BU05010109	Verspreide huizen	480	925	881	Location in the municipality
BU05010200	Zwartewaal	590	21	20	Location in the municipality
BU05010201	Tuindorp-Hofstede	1010	30	27	Location in the municipality
BU05010202	Zalmlaan	70	17	11	Location in the municipality
BU05010209	Verspreide huizen	250	883	802	Location in the municipality
BU05010300	Recreatiestrook Brielse Maas	30	232	120	Location in the municipality
