= Marietje Jan de Gortersdochter =

Marietje Jan de Gortersdochter (died 21 February 1539) was a Dutch Anabaptist. She is known in history as a martyr of the Anabaptist faith and the mother of the Anabaptist leader David Joris. She was married to the merchant Joris van Amersfoort. She was executed by decapitation in Delft after banned books had been found among her possessions.
