= Sebastian Franck =

German freethinker, humanist and radical reformer

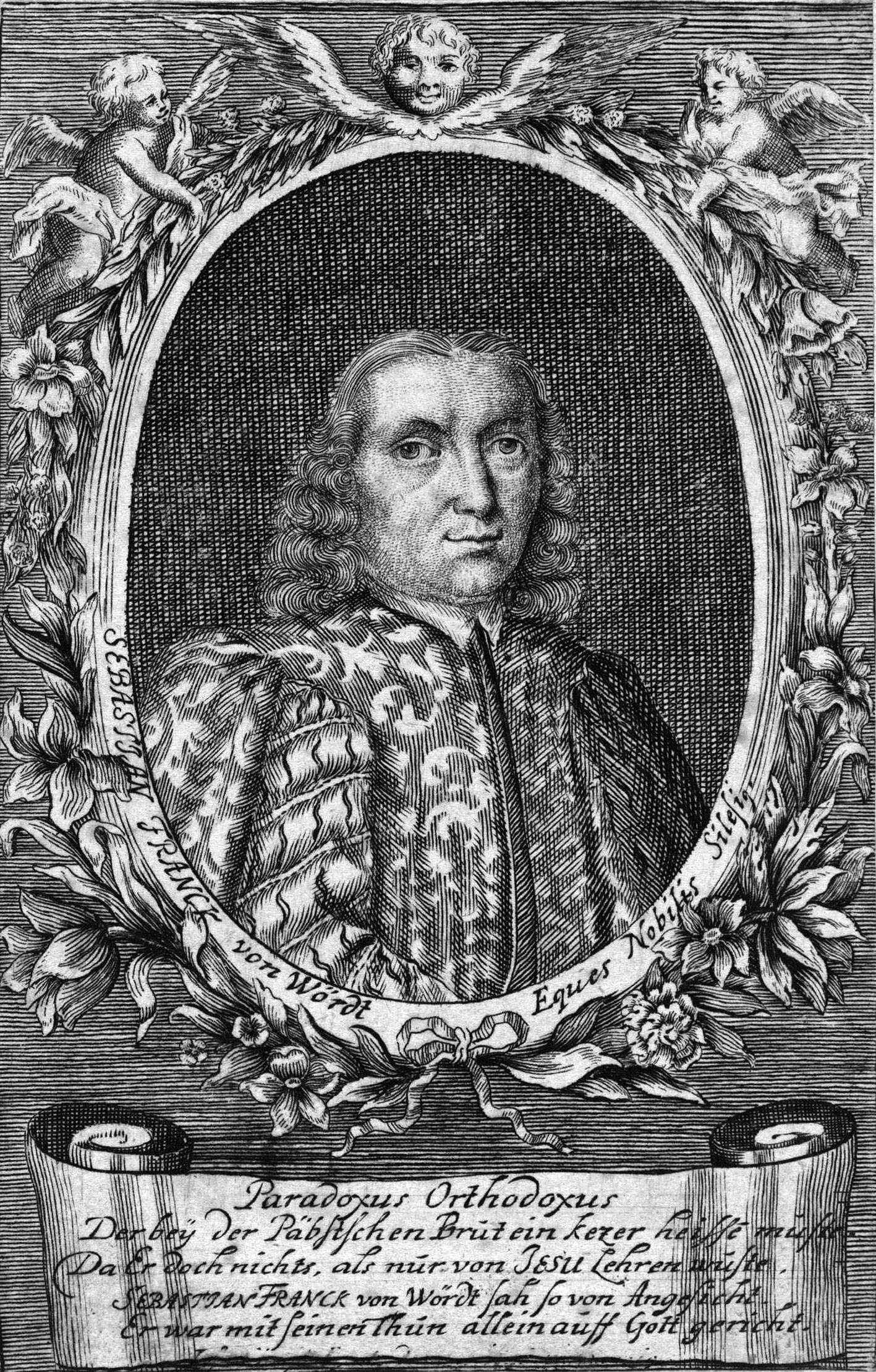
Sebastian Franck.

Sebastian Franck (20 January 1499 Donauwörth, Swabia – c. 1543 Basel, Switzerland) was a 16th-century German freethinker, humanist, and radical reformer.

== Biography ==
Franck was born in 1499 in Donauwörth, Swabia. Because of this he styled himself Franck von Wörd. He entered the University of Ingolstadt on 26 March 1515, and afterwards went to Bethlehem College, incorporated with the university, as an institution of the Dominicans at Heidelberg. Here he met Martin Bucer and Martin Frecht, with whom he might have attended Luther's Heidelberg disputation in October 1518.

Originally ordained as a priest, in 1525 Franck went over to the Reformed party at Nuremberg and became preacher at Gustenfelden. His first work was a German translation (with additions) of the first part of the Diallage (or Conciliatio locorum Scripturae), directed against Sacramentarians and Anabaptists by Andrew Althamer, then deacon of St. Sebald at Nuremberg. On 17 March 1528 he married Ottilie Beham, either the sister or a near relative of the exiled "godless" painters, Bartholomew and Sebald Beham, pupils of Albrecht Dürer and followers of Hans Denck. In the same year he wrote a treatise against drunkenness. In 1529 he produced Klagbrief, a free version of the Supplycacyon of the Beggers, written by the English Protestant Simon Fish. Franck, in his preface, says the original was in English; elsewhere he says it was in Latin; the theory that his German was really the original is not warranted.

Advance in his religious ideas led him to seek the freer atmosphere of Strasbourg in the autumn of 1529. To his translation (1530) of a Latin Chronicle and Description of Turkey (Turkenchronik), by a Transylvanian captive, which had been prefaced by Luther, he added an appendix holding up the Turk as in many respects an example to Christians. He also substituted, in lieu of the restrictions of Lutheran, Zwinglian and Anabaptist sects, the vision of an invisible spiritual church, universal in its scope. To this ideal he remained faithful. At Strassburg began his friendship with Kaspar Schwenkfeld. Here he also published, in 1531, his most important work, the Chronica, Zeitbuch und Geschichtsbibel, largely a compilation on the basis of the Nuremberg Chronicle (1493), and in its treatment of social and religious questions connected with the Reformation. In it he exhibited a strong sympathy with "heretics" and fairness to all kinds of freedom in opinion. As a German historian, he is a forerunner of Gottfried Arnold. Driven from Strassburg by the authorities, after a short imprisonment in December 1531, he tried to make a living in 1532 as a soapboiler at Esslingen, removing in 1533 for a better market to Ulm, where on 28 October 1534 he was admitted as a burgess.

His Weltbuch, a supplement to his Chronica, was printed at Tübingen in 1534. His publication, in the same year, of the Paradoxa brought him into trouble with the authorities. An order for his banishment was withdrawn on his promise to submit future works for censure. Not interpreting this as applying to works printed outside Ulm, he published in 1538 at Augsburg his Guldin Arch and at Frankfort his Germaniae chronicon, with the result that he had to leave Ulm in January 1539. He seems to have had no settled abode from that time. At Basel he found work as a printer, and it was probably there that he died in the winter of 1542–1543. He had published in 1539 his Kriegbuchlein des Friedens, his Schrifftliche und ganz grundliche Auslegung des 64 Psalms, and his Das verbutschierte mit sieben Siegein verschlossene Buch (a biblical index, exhibiting the dissonance of Scripture). In 1541 he published his Spruchwörter (a collection of proverbs). In 1542 he issued a new edition of his Paradoxa and some smaller works.

Franck combined the humanist's passion for freedom with the mystic's devotion to the religion of the spirit. Luther contemptuously dismissed him as a mouthpiece of the devil. Martin Frecht of Nuremberg pursued him with bitter zeal. But his courage did not fail him, and in his last year, in a public Latin letter, he exhorted his friend Johann Campanus to maintain freedom of thought in face of the charge of heresy.

Franck came to believe that God communicates with individuals through a portion of the divine remaining in each human being. He came to dismiss the human institution of the church, and believed that theology could not properly claim to give expression to this inner word of God in the heart of the believer. For example, Franck wrote, "To substitute Scripture for the self-revealing Spirit is to put the dead letter in the place of the living Word..."

Franck's comment "God is an unutterable sigh, lying in the depths of the heart," quoted by Julius Wilhelm Zincgref was described by Ludwig Feuerbach as "the most remarkable, the profoundest, truest expression of Christian Mysticism".

== Writings ==
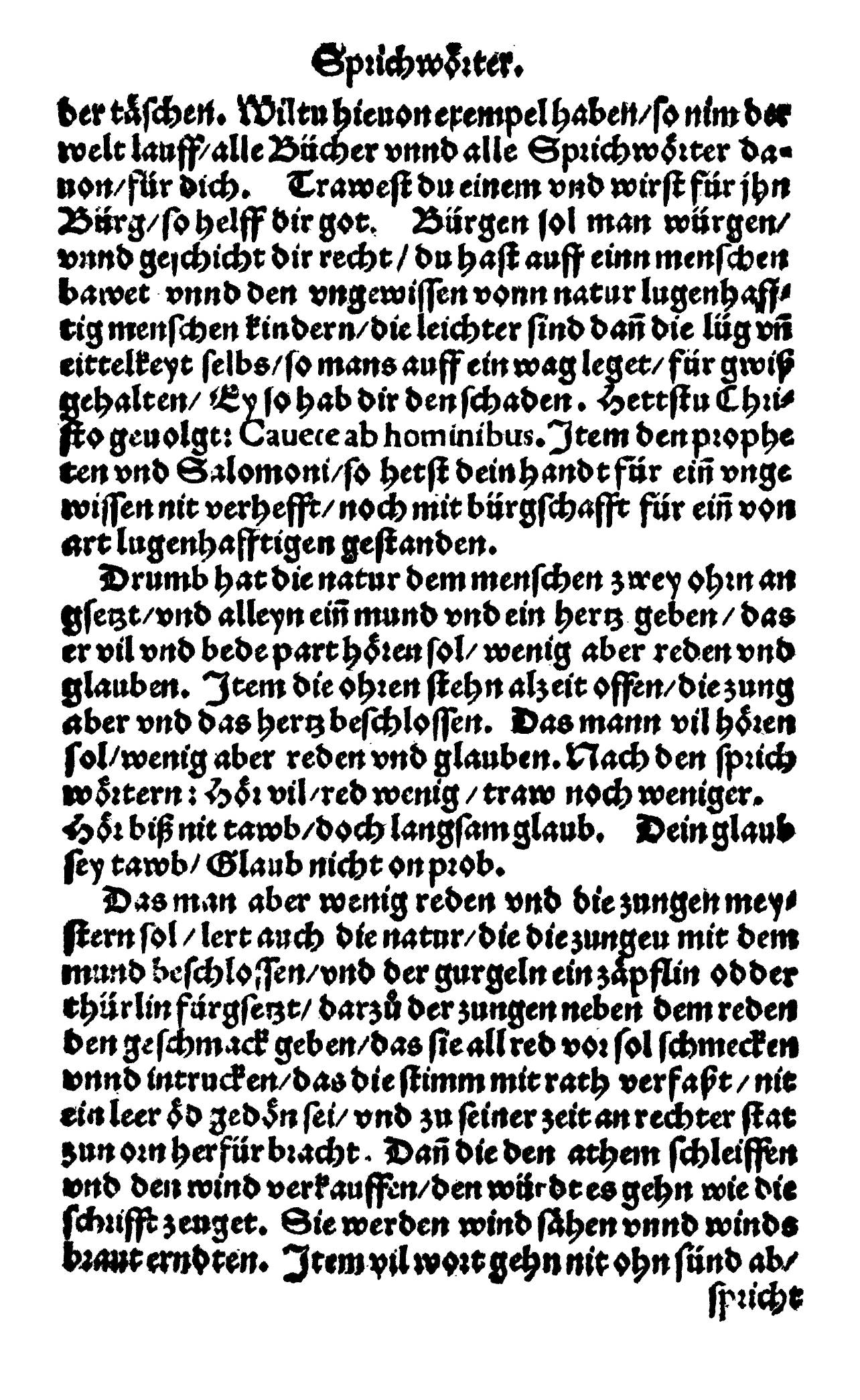
Sprichwörter, schöne, weise, herrliche Klugreden, 1541.

- Autobiographical Letter to Johann Campanus (1531)
- Weltbuch (1534)
- Chronicle of Germany (1538)
- Golden Arch (1538)
- A Universal Chronicle of the World's History from the Earliest Times to the Present
- Book of the Ages
- Chronicle and Description of Turkey
- Paradoxa (1534)
- Preface and Translation into German of Althamer's Diallage
- Seven Sealed Book (1539)
- Tree of Knowledge of Good and Evil
- Translation with Additions of Erasmus' Praise of Folly
- The Vanity of Arts and Sciences
