= De Pankoekstermolen, Witmarsum =

Smock mill in the Netherlands

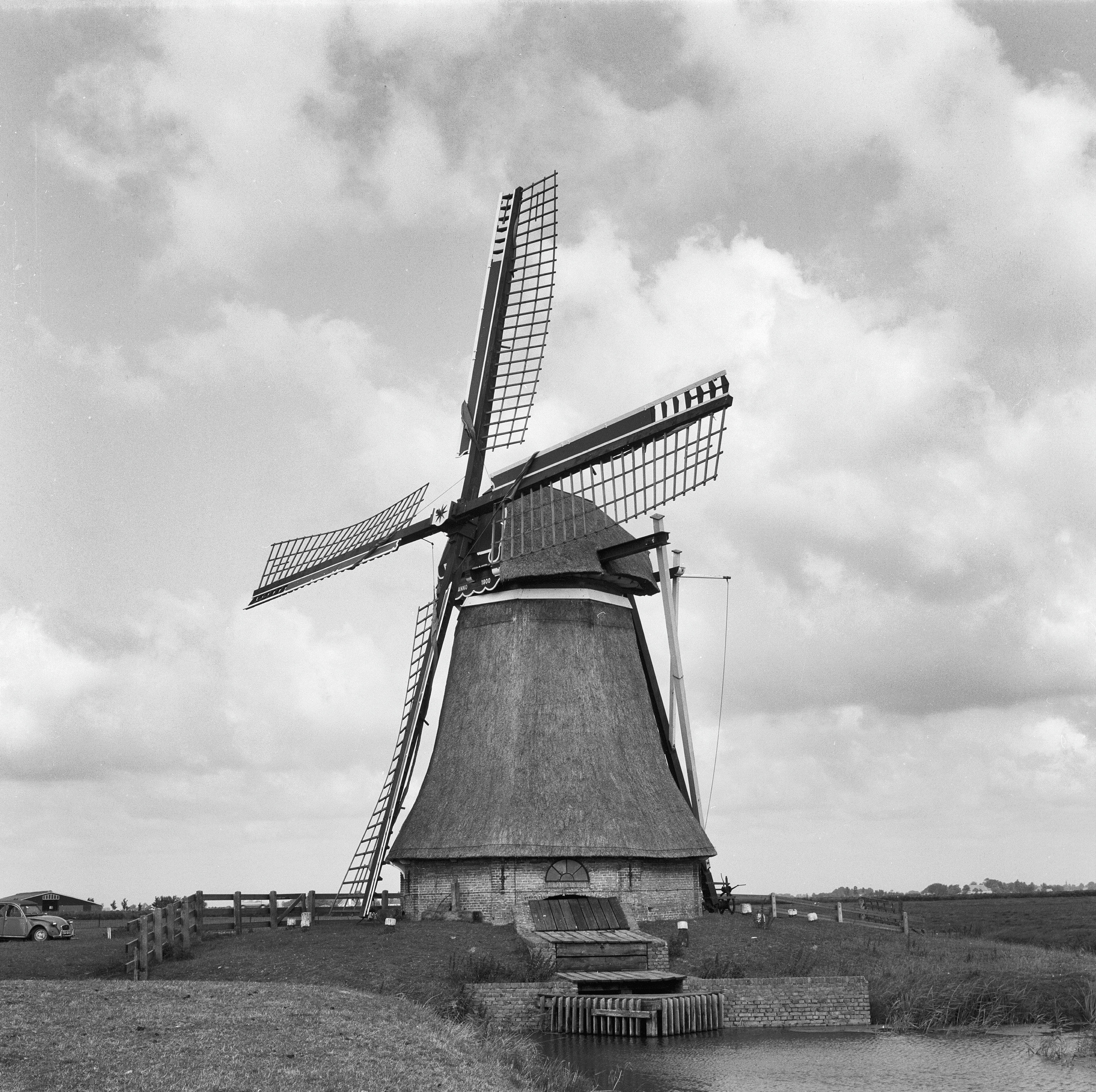
- De Pankoekstermolen, July 1982.

Origin
- Mill name: De Pankoekstermolen
- Mill location: Rijpenderlaan 8, 8748 CW, Witmarsum
- Coordinates: 53°06′06″N 5°30′43″E
- Operator(s): Stichting de Fryske Mole
- Year built: 1900

Information
- Purpose: Drainage mill
- Type: Smock mill
- Storeys: Two storey smock
- Base storeys: One storey base
- Smock sides: Eight sides
- No. of sails: Four sails
- Type of sails: Common sails
- Windshaft: Cast iron
- Winding: Tailpole and winch
- Type of pump: Archimedes' screw

De Pankoekstermolen is a smock mill in Witmarsum, Friesland, Netherlands which was built in 1900. It has been restored to working order and is designated as being in reserve. It is listed as a Rijksmonument.

== History ==
De Pankoekstermolen was built in 1900 to drain the 700 hectares (1,700 acres) Oosthemmerpolder. It replaced a mill built in 1817 that was struck by lightning and burned down in 1899. De Pankoekstermolen was built by millwright J H Westra of Franeker, Friesland. A diesel engine was installed in the mill in 1967. Until 1975, the mill was fitted with Patent sails. Construction of a new pumping station in 1976 made the mill redundant; the diesel engine was then removed. A restoration of the mill was carried out by millwright Westra of Franeker in 1975-76. On 21 June 1977, De Pankoekstermolen was sold to Stichting De Fryske Mole, the 15th mill bought by that organisation. In 2006, the mill was officially designated as being held in reserve. A new restoration was begun in 2014. It is listed as a Rijksmonument, №39438.

== Description ==
De Pankoekstermolen is what the Dutch describe as a Grondzeiler. It is a two storey smock mill on a single storey base. There is no stage, the sails reaching almost to ground level. The mill is winded by tailpole and winch. The smock and cap are thatched. The sails are Common sails. They have a span of 19.80 metres (65 ft 0 in). The sails are carried on a cast iron windshaft, which was cast by Gietijzerij De Prins van Oranje, The Hague, South Holland. The windshaft carries the brake wheel which has 55 cogs. This drives the wallower (29 cogs) at the top of the upright shaft. At the bottom of the upright shaft there are two crown wheels The upper crown wheel, which has 39 cogs, drives an Archimedes' screw via a crown wheel. The lower crown wheel, which has 35 cogs is carried on the axle of an Archimedes' screw, which is used to drain the polder. The axle of the screw is 61 centimetres (24 in) diameter and 4.77 metres (15 ft 8 in) long. The screw is 1.44 metres (4 ft 9 in) diameter. It is inclined at 21°. Each revolution of the screw lifts 956 litres (210 imp gal) of water.

== Public access ==
De Pankoekstermolen is open whenever it is working, or by appointment.
