= Brielle =

Town in Voorne aan Zee, the Netherlands

Brielle Brill
- Town
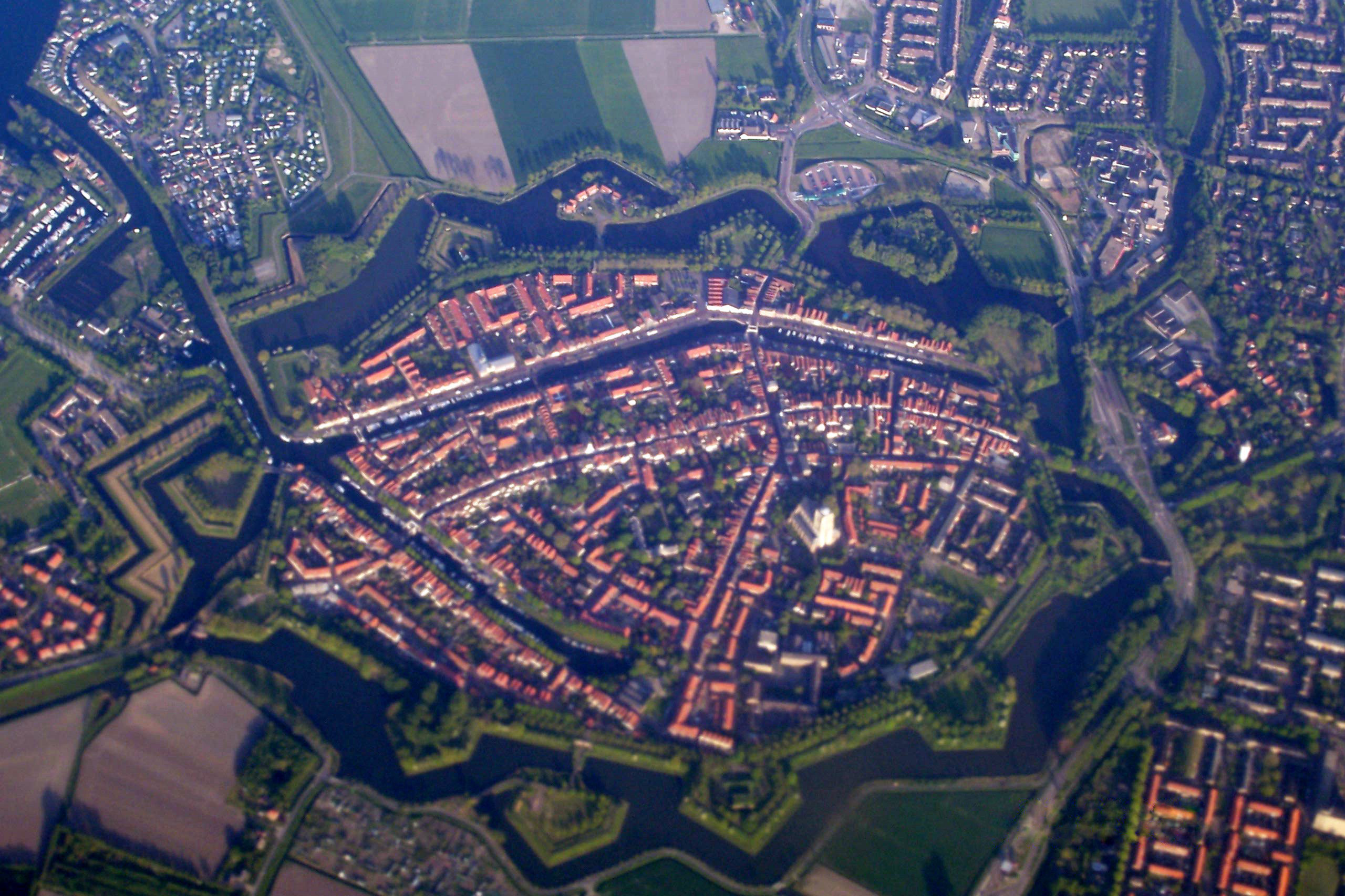
- Historic town centre

- Flag Coat of arms

- Location in South Holland
- Coordinates: 51°54′N 4°10′E
- Country: Netherlands
- Province: South Holland
- Municipality: Voorne aan Zee

Area
  - Total: 31.14 km^{2} (12.02 sq mi)
  - Land: 27.55 km^{2} (10.64 sq mi)
  - Water: 3.59 km^{2} (1.39 sq mi)
- Elevation: 2 m (6.6 ft)

Population (January 2021)
  - Total: 17,439
  - Density: 633/km^{2} (1,640/sq mi)
- Demonym: Briellenaar
- Time zone: UTC+1 (CET)
  - Summer (DST): UTC+2 (CEST)
- Postcode: 3230–3232
- Area code: 0181
- Website: www.brielle.nl

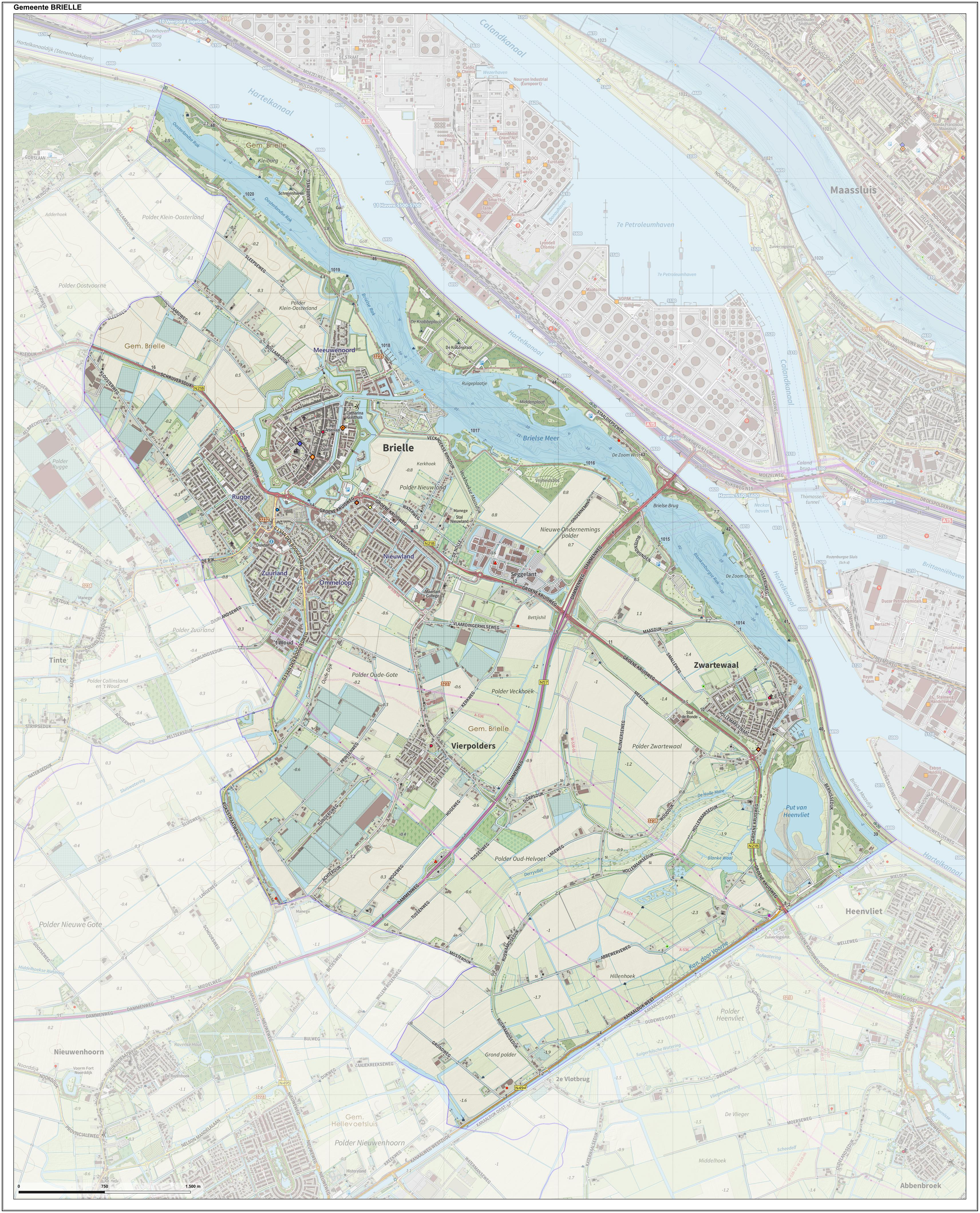
Dutch Topographic map of Brielle, June 2015

Brielle (pronounced [ˈbrilə]), also called Den Briel in Dutch and Brill in English, is a town and historic seaport in the western Netherlands, in the province of South Holland, on the north side of the island of Voorne-Putten, at the mouth of the New Maas. The former municipality covered an area of 31.14 km^{2} (12.02 sq mi) of which 3.59 km^{2} (1.39 sq mi) was water. In 2021 its population was 17,439.

The former municipality of Brielle also included the communities of Vierpolders and Zwartewaal.

On 1 January 2023, the municipality of Brielle merged with Hellevoetsluis and Westvoorne into the new municipality of Voorne aan Zee.

Brielle, New Jersey was named after Brielle by the Dutch colonists of New Jersey, originally New Netherland.

== History ==
Brielle is a very old, fortified town. Its name is derived from the Celtic word brogilo (meaning "closed area" or "hunting grounds"). The oldest writings about Brielle indicate that the current location is the "new" Brielle. Den ouden Briel (Old Brill) must have been situated somewhere else on the Voorne-Putten Island. It grew into a town of prestige in the 14th century. In 1330, Gerard van Voorne, independent Lord of Voorne and Viscount of Zeeland, granted town rights to Brielle. This gave the town governmental and jurisdictional powers and certain trading rights, such as the right to trade fish and collect port taxes. The town was for a long time the seat of the Lords of Voorne, until this fiefdom was added to the County of Holland in 1371. It had its own harbour and traded with the countries around the Baltic Sea. Brielle even had its own trading colony in Sweden.

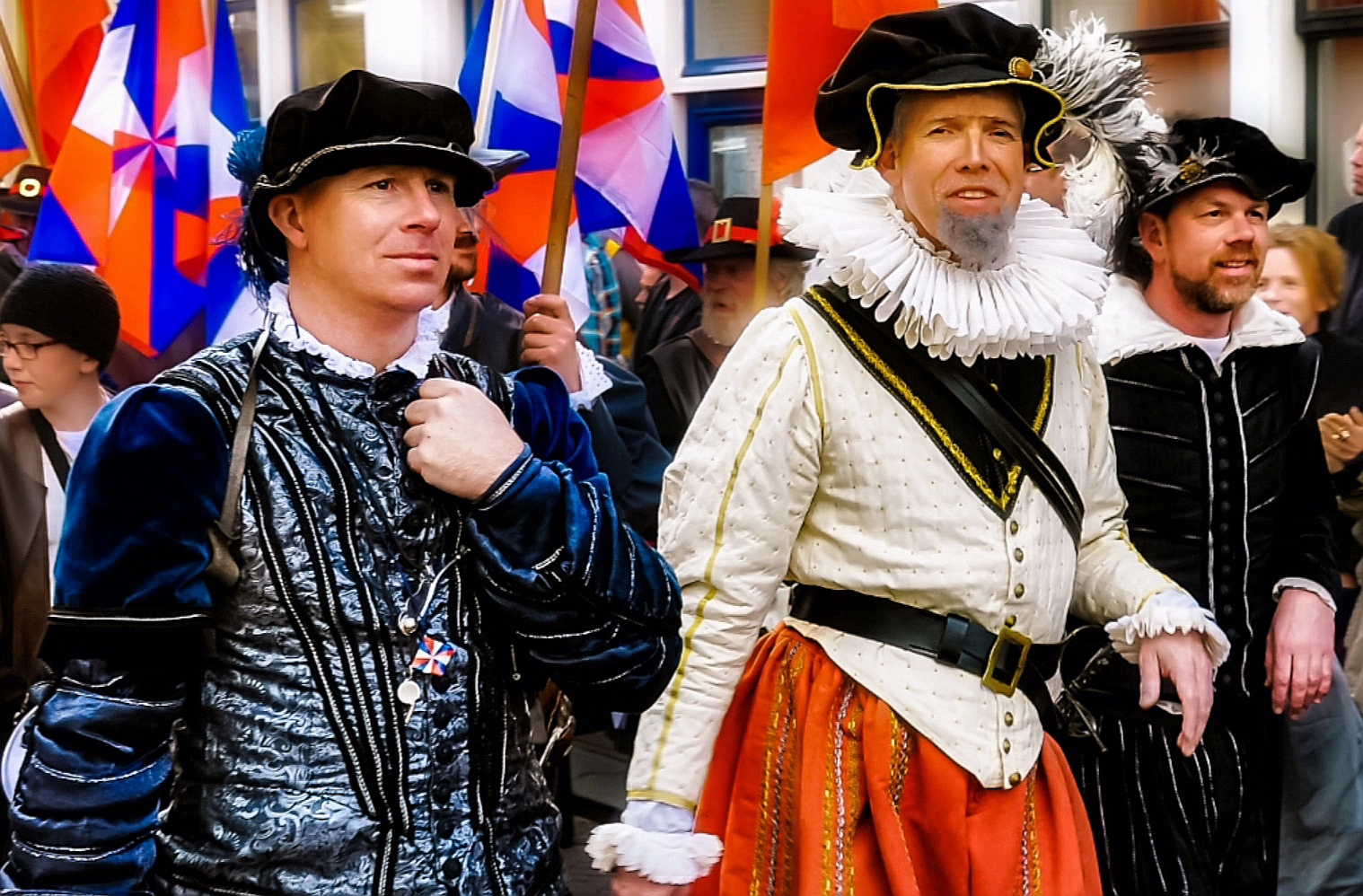
Historic parade in Den Briel to celebrate the 540th anniversary of the Capture of Brielle on April 1, 2012. The leaders of the sea beggars, William II de La Marck, Lord Lumey (middle), Willem Bloys van Treslong (left) and Lenaert Jansz de Graeff (right).

During the Eighty Years' War between the Netherlands and Spain, the Capture of Brielle on April 1, 1572, by Protestant rebels, the Watergeuzen, marked a turning point in the conflict, as many towns in Holland then began to support William of Orange against the Spanish Duke Fernando Álvarez de Toledo, 3rd Duke of Alba who was sent to pacify The Netherlands. This event is still celebrated each year on April 1 and the night before (known as Chalk Night (kalknacht) when the town is defaced with chalk - and now also white paint). Dutch students are taught a short rhyme to remember this fact, which rhyme refers to April Fools' Day:

Op 1 april verloor Alva de bril.
Op April zes verloor Alva zijn fles

On April 1st, Alva lost his glasses
On April 6th Alva lost his bottle

In Dutch, "de bril" is the word for "the glasses," and closely rhymes with Den Briel; as does "Fles" which stands for the town of Vlissingen or Flushing, the next town to be captured by the Dutch rebels.

After the capture of Brielle the Protestant rebels tortured and murdered the Catholic Martyrs of Gorkum and Brielle has become a pilgrimage location since then.

In August 1585, Brielle was one of the three Dutch towns that became an English possession by the Treaty of Nonsuch when Queen Elizabeth I received it as security of payment for 5000 soldiers (led by the Earl of Leicester) and used by the Dutch in their struggle against the Spanish. The first English governor of Brielle was Thomas Cecil, 1st Earl of Exeter, succeeded by Edward Conway, 1st Viscount Conway who named his daughter Brilliana in honour of the town. English garrisons were stationed here and at Flushing. Edmund Sheffield, 3rd Baron Sheffield governed the town from 1598. In 1617, these cities returned to the Netherlands.

== Twin cities ==
Brielle is twinned with:

- (United Kingdom) Queenborough, on the Isle of Sheppey, in Kent, since 1967
- Havlíčkův Brod, Czech Republic, since 1985

== Notable people ==
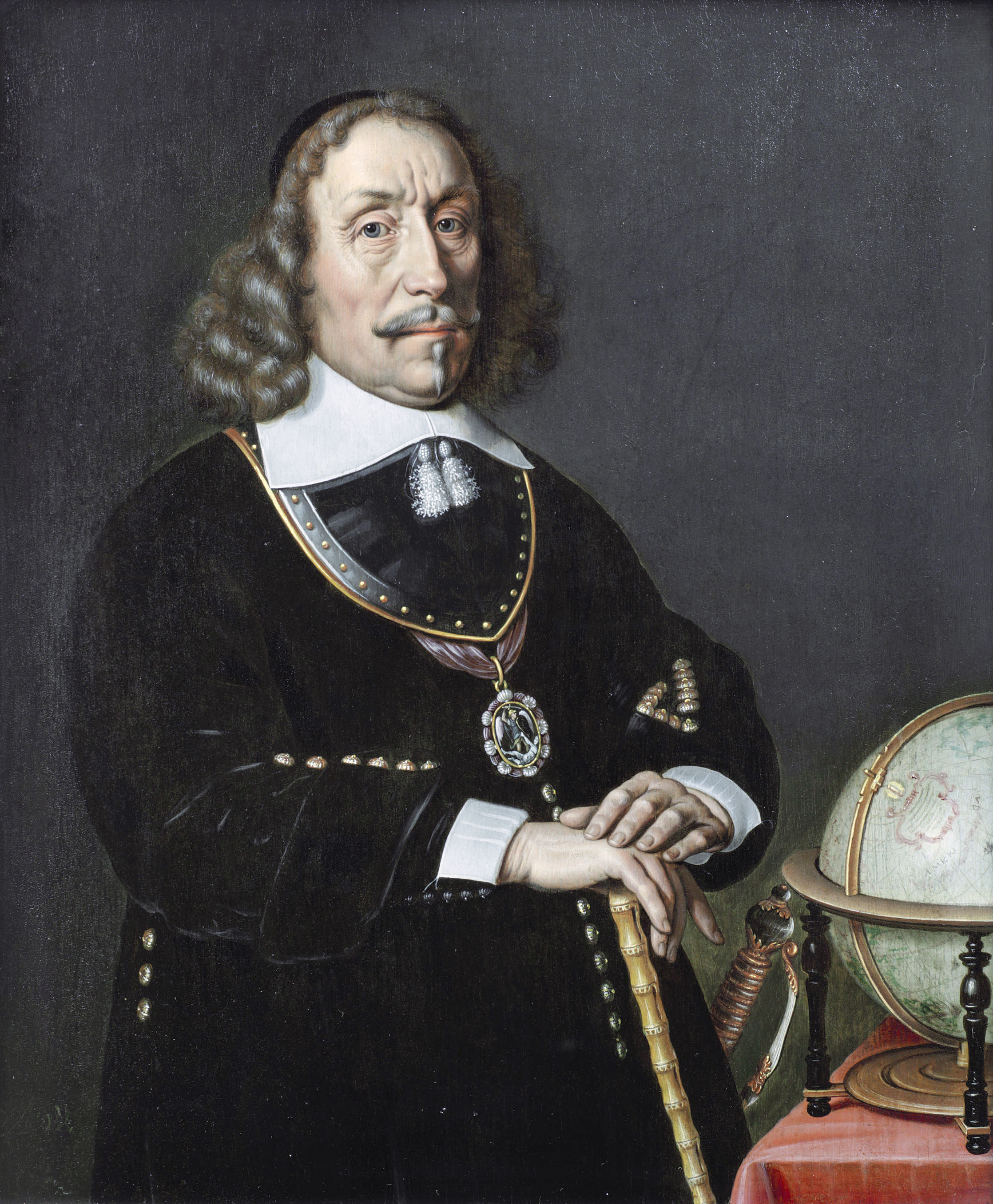
Witte Cornelisz de With

- Anneke Esaiasdochter (1509 in Brielle – 1539), a Dutch Anabaptist executed as a heretic, a Protestant martyr.
- Willem Bloys van Treslong (1529–1594), a nobleman, led the Sea Beggars and the Capture of Brielle in 1572.
- Maarten Tromp (1598 in Brielle – 1653), a Dutch army general and admiral in the Dutch navy
- Witte de With (1599 in Hoogendijk – 1658), a Dutch naval officer during the Eighty Years War and the First Anglo-Dutch War
- Ludowyk Smits (1635 in Zwartewaal – 1707), a Dutch Golden Age painter
- Philips van Almonde (1644 in Den Briel – 1711), a Dutch Lieutenant Admiral
- Constantijn van Daalen (1884 in Brielle – 1931), a Dutch gymnast who competed in the 1908 Summer Olympics
- Toon Tellegen (born 1941 in Brielle), a Dutch writer and poet, known for children's books and a physician

== See also ==
- Historisch Museum Den Briel
- Districts and neighbourhoods of Brielle

== Gallery ==
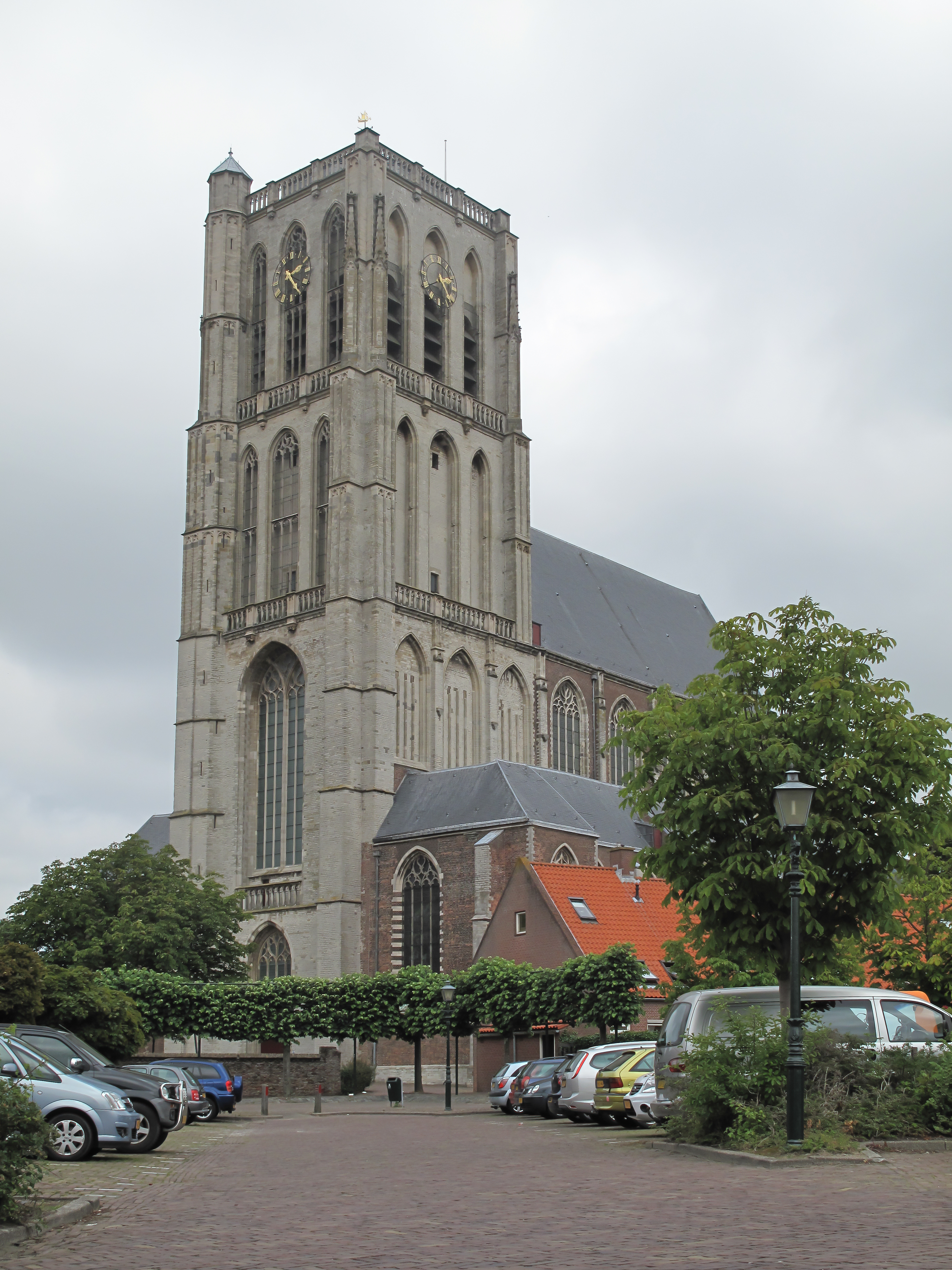
Brielle, church: de Sint Catharijne kerk

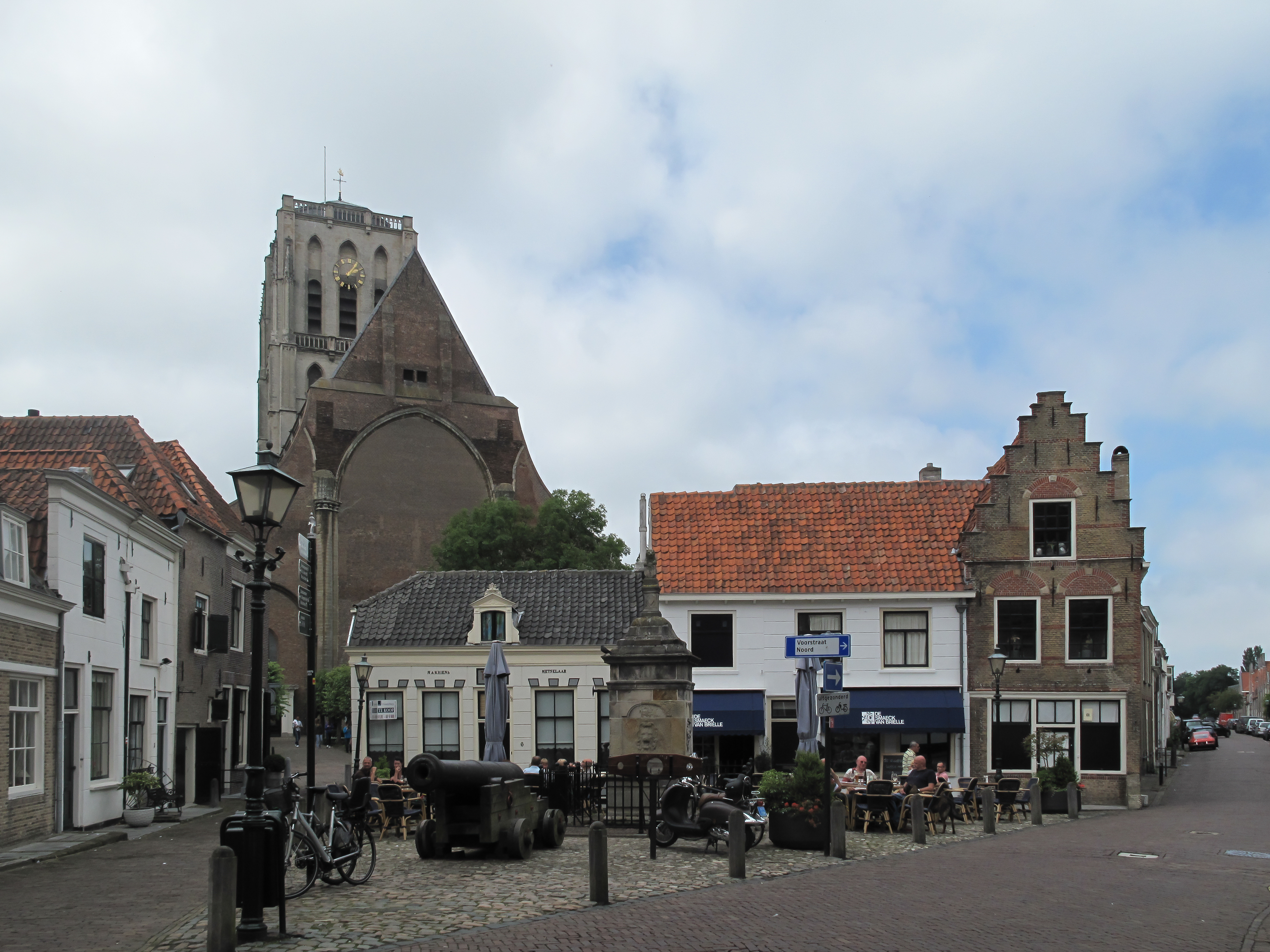
Brielle, monumental houses at the Wellerondom

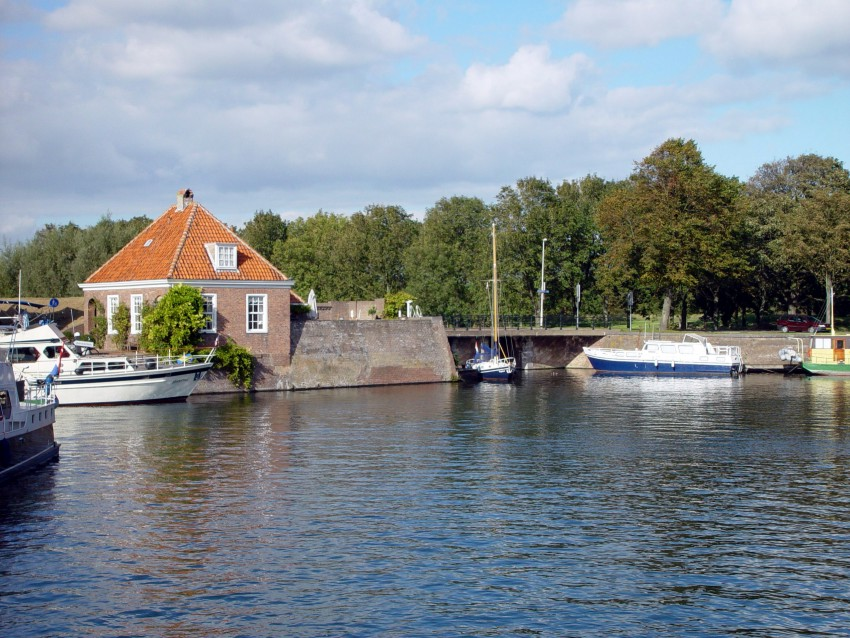
Brielle - panoramio

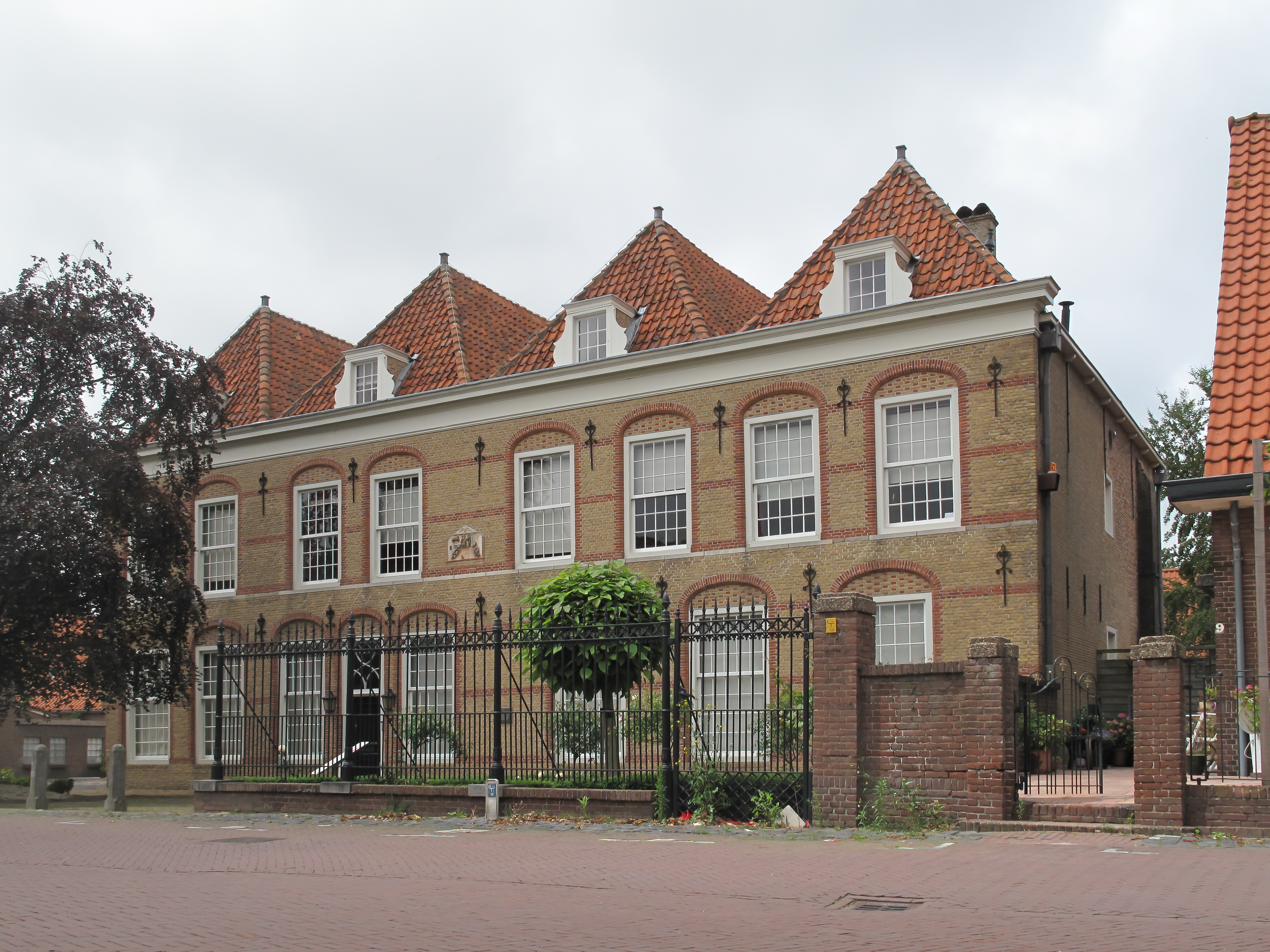
Brielle, former orphanage

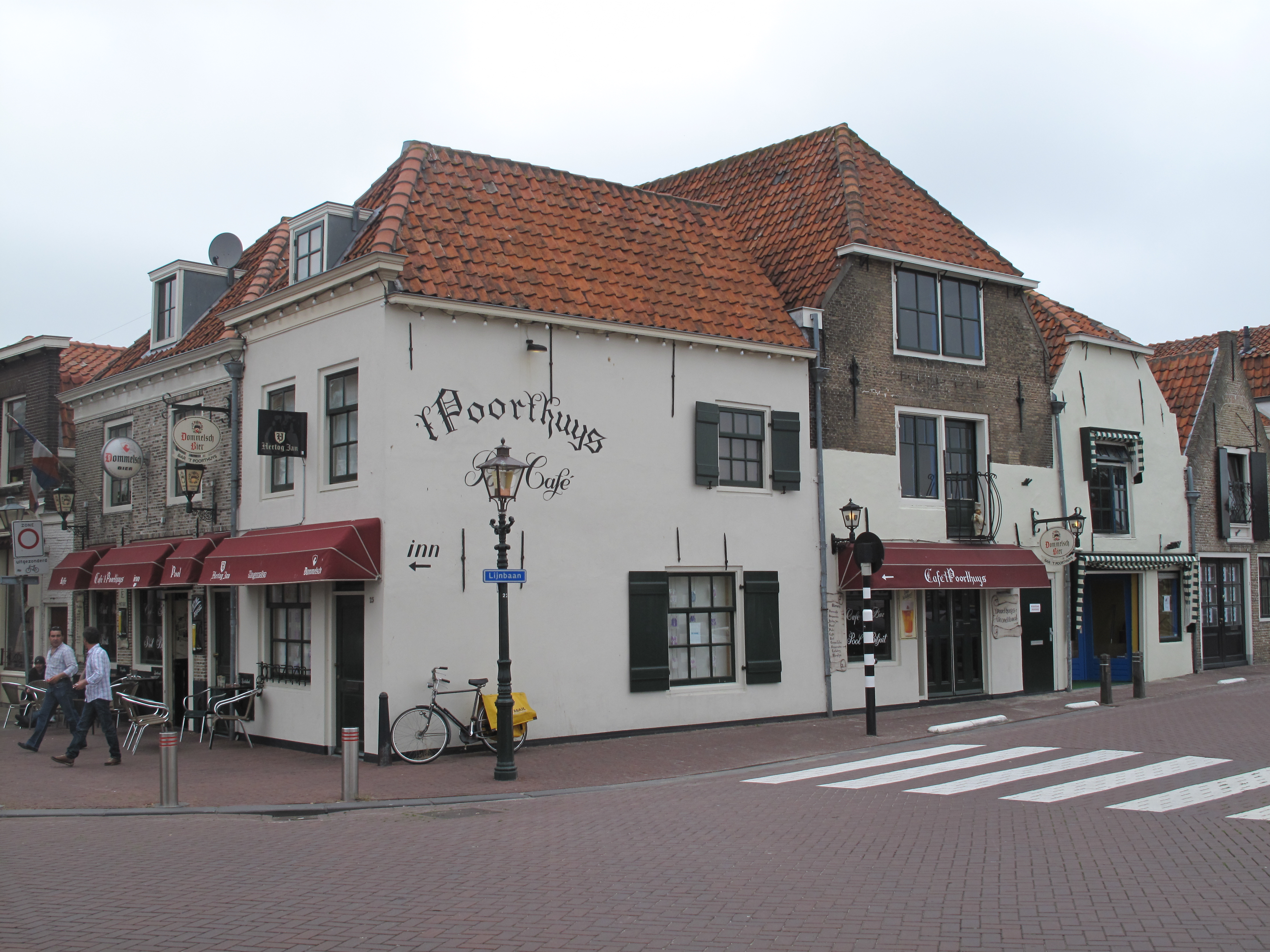
Brielle, monumental houses Vischstraat
