= De Onderneming, Witmarsum =

Windmill in Witmarsum, Netherlands

De Onderneming, Witmarsun
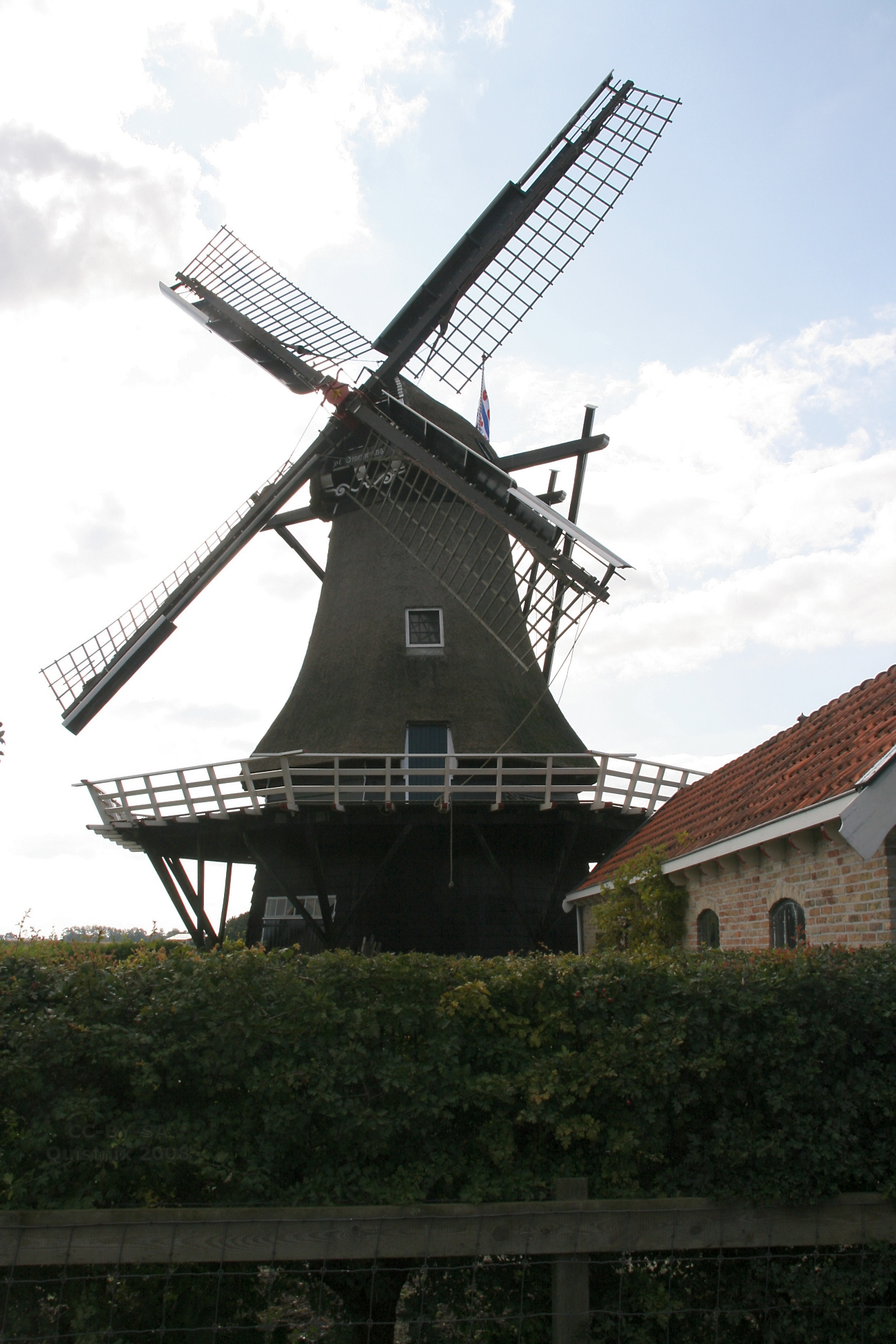
- De Onderneming, September 2008

Origin
- Mill name: De Onderneming
- Mill location: Molenweg 43, 8748 CN, Witmarsum
- Coordinates: 53°05′57″N 5°28′08″E
- Operator(s): Stichting tot Behoud van Momumenten in de gemeente Súdwest Fryslân
- Year built: 1862

Information
- Purpose: Corn mill and pearl barley mill
- Type: Smock mill
- Storeys: Three storey smock
- Base storeys: Two storey base
- Smock sides: Eight sides
- No. of sails: Four sails
- Type of sails: Common sails, Fok system on leading edges
- Windshaft: Cast iron
- Winding: Tailpole and winch
- No. of pairs of millstones: Four pairs
- Size of millstones: 1.60 metres (5 ft 3 in), 1.56 metres (5 ft 1 in), 1.50 metres (4 ft 11 in) and 1.47 metres (4 ft 10 in) diameter

De Onderneming (Dutch pronunciation: [də ˌʔɔndərˈneːmɪŋ]; English: The Company) is a smock mill in Witmarsum, Friesland, Netherlands which was built in 1850 and is in working order. It is used as a training mill. The mill is listed as a Rijksmonument.

== History ==
De Onderneming was built in 1850, probably by millwright Van der Meer of Harlingen, Friesland. The foundation stone was laid on 17 September. In 1896, the mill was bought by Geurt Stoffels. It passed to his son Heimen in 1956. Following Heimen's death in 1968, the mill fell into disrepair. It was bought by the Gemeente Wûnseradiel. Restoration took place in 1970-71. Further restorations took place in 1988 and 1994. The mill is in the ownership of the Stichting tot Behoud van Momumenten in de gemeente Súdwest Fryslân. Used as a training mill, it is listed as a Rijksmonument, № 39437.

== Description ==
De Onderneming is what the Dutch describe as a "Stellingmolen". It is a smock mill on a wooden base. The stage is 4.00 metres (13 ft 1 in) above ground level. The smock and cap are thatched. The mill is winded by tailpole and winch. The sails are Common sails, fitted with the Fok system on their leading edges. They have a span of 19.00 metres (62 ft 4 in). The sails are carried on a cast-iron windshaft, which was cast by Fabrikaat De Muinck Keizer of Martenshoek, Groningen in 1891. The windshaft also carries the brake wheel which has 60 cogs. This drives the wallower (31 cogs) at the top of the upright shaft. At the bottom of the upright shaft is the great spur wheel, which has 75 cogs. The great spur wheel drives a pair of 1.60 metres (5 ft 3 in) diameter Cullen millstones via a lantern pinion stone nut which has 22 staves. A pair of 1.50 metres (4 ft 11 in) Cullen millstones is driven via a lantern pinion stone nut which has 19 staves. Two pairs of Peak millstones, of 1.56 metres (5 ft 1 in) and 1.47 metres (4 ft 10 in) diameter, are driven via lantern pinion stone nuts which have 22 staves each.

== Millers ==
- Geurt Stoffels (1896-1956)
- Heimen Stoffels (1956–64)

== Public access ==
De Onderneming is open to the public on Saturday between 09:00 and 12:00, or by appointment.
