= Enchiridion (Dirk Philips) =

1564 book by Dirk Philips

The Enchiridion, Manual or Handbook of Dirk Philips is alternatively titled The Handbook of the Christian Doctrine and Religion, compiled (by the grace of God) from the Holy Scriptures for the benefit of all lovers of the Truth. The Enchiridion had passed through numerous editions in the Dutch—in which it was originally written and published—and later in German as well as in French. The Enchiridion (first Dutch ed. 1564, many Dutch and German reprints) contains the tract Een lieffelycke Vermaninghe (van den ban) first printed in 1558, a most vigorous defense of strict avoidance. A second writing on the subject, Naeghelaten Schrift van Ban ends Mydinghe, first published in Dutch in 1602 attached to his Van die Echt der Christenen, was also reprinted in both Dutch and German.

Enchiridion contains five letters and eleven treatises and retains influence with conservative Anabaptist sects, including the Amish and some Mennonite groups, who cite its clarity on matters of church discipline, such as excommunication.
