= Historisch Museum Den Briel =

Museum in Brielle, the Netherlands

Coordinates: 51.9022°N 4.1646°E

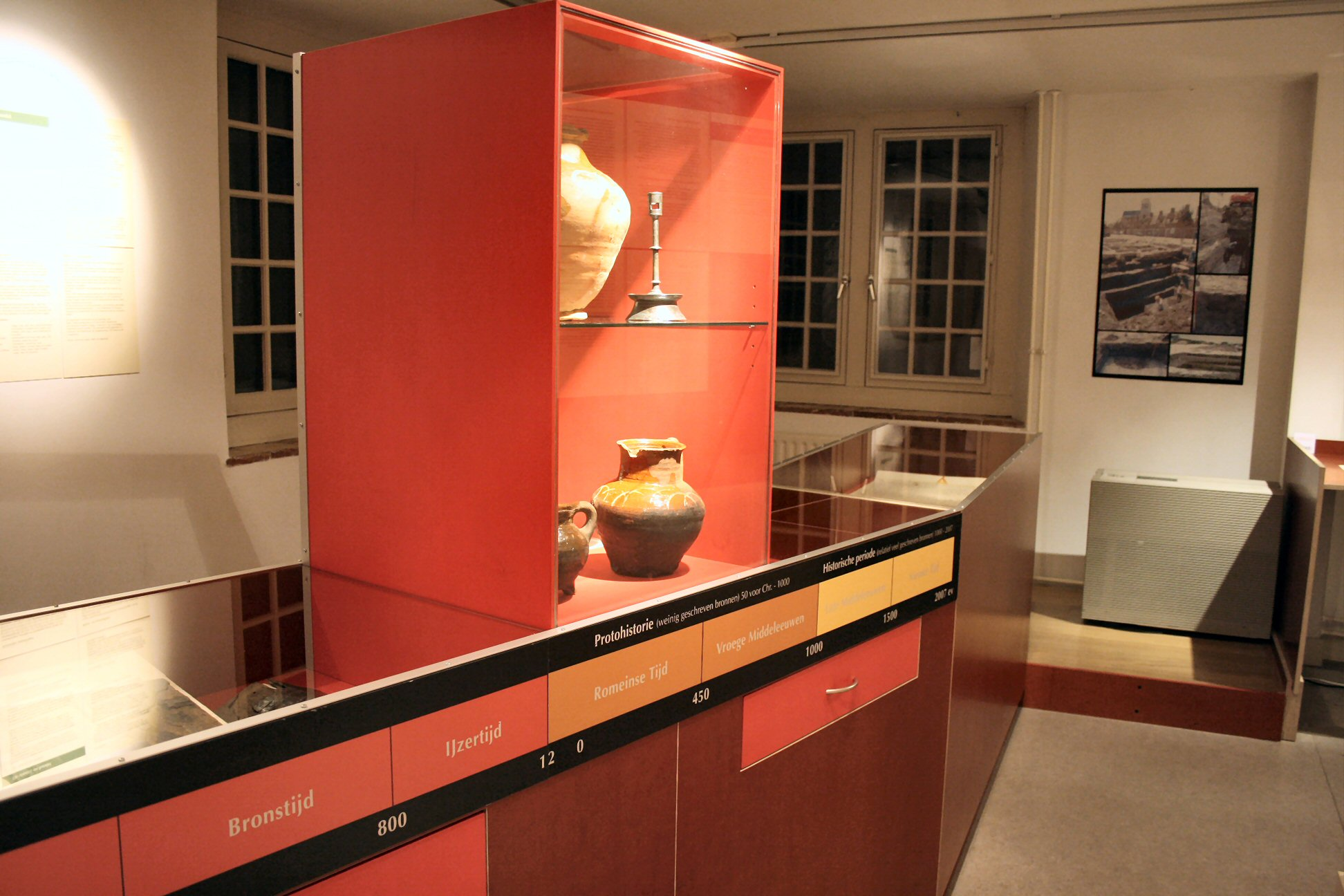
Part of the archaeological exhibition on the ground floor of the museum

The Historisch Museum Den Briel (English: Brielle Historical Museum) is a Dutch museum located in Brielle. The museum was previously known as the Trompmuseum, after Brielle-born Maarten Tromp who defeated the Spanish fleet in the Eighty Years' War.

== History ==
The museum was founded in 1912 by the government of Den Briel. In 1958 a charitable organization supporting the museum was created. In 1998 the museum received a nationally recognized certification of quality.

The museum has twice suffered from theft in recent history. In 2003 nine gold coins were stolen and in 2009 thieves took an 18th-century clay pipe from the exhibition.

== Collection ==
The museum is organized largely chronologically and in part thematically. At ground level a largely archaeological exhibition is on display. This exhibition was thoroughly reorganized and expanded in 2007, adding most prominently some recently discovered late medieval wax tablets.

Apart from prehistorical, Roman and medieval Brielle the museum also presents Brielle during the Eighty Years' War and the Second World War.

The museum is located inside Brielle's former weigh house and local prison, built in 1623. With old prison cells on display, the building itself is considered part of the collection.
