= Johann Campanus =

Johann Campanus (also Johannes Campanus) was a Flemish religious reformer of the sixteenth century. In his Autobiographical Letter to Johann Campanus (1531), a public Latin epistle, Sebastian Franck exhorted Campanus to maintain freedom of thought in face of the charge of heresy.

As a preacher, Campanus knew the Anabaptist prophet Melchior Hoffman (c.1495–1543). Hoffman had developed a Zwinglian view of the Eucharist. Martin Luther himself was alarmed at this. At a colloquy of preachers in Flensburg on 8 April 1529, Hoffman, Campanus, and others were put on the defensive. Hoffman maintained (against the "magic" of the Lutheran interpretation) that the function of the Eucharist, like that of preaching, is nothing more than an appeal for spiritual union with Christ.
