= David Joris =

Dutch Anabaptist and painter (c.1501–1556)

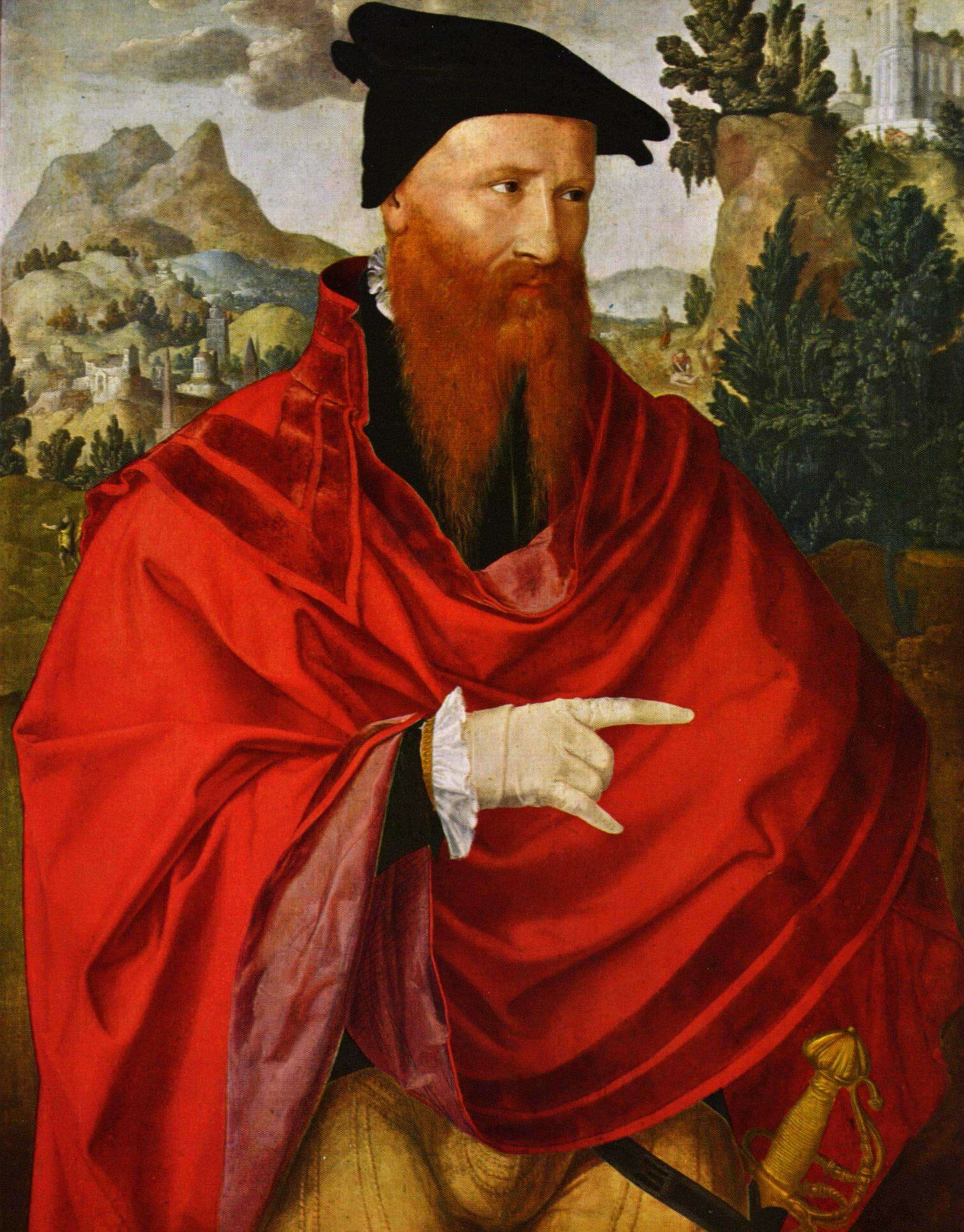
Jan van Scorel: David Joris, 16th century

David Joris (c. 1501 – 25 August 1556, sometimes Jan Jorisz or Joriszoon; formerly anglicised David Gorge) was an important Anabaptist leader in the Netherlands before 1540.

== Life ==
Joris was probably born in Flanders, the son of Marietje Jan de Gortersdochter and Georgius Joris de Koman, an amateur actor and shopkeeper. He was a disciple of Melchior Hoffman.

By trade David Joris was a glass painter or tinsel painter, having learned the art in Antwerp; in 1522 he painted windows for the church at Enkhuizen, North Holland. In 1524 he married Dirckgen Willems, and also took interest in the Reformation movement of Martin Luther. On Ascension Day 1528 he committed an outrage on the sacrament carried in procession; he was placed in the pillory, had his tongue bored, and was banished from Delft for three years.

In 1533 he accepted the ideas of the Anabaptists, and was baptized in Delft by Obbe Philips. According to the Mennonite Encyclopedia, "He was an influential figure in Anabaptism's consolidation period following the fall of Münster." He rejected the violence of Münster, but theoretically accepted polygamy (he is not known to have practiced it). After the Münster debacle, a number of diverse disciples of Hoffman gathered for counsel at Bocholt in 1536. Joris had some success in highlighting their common beliefs, while defusing the ideas of those who wanted vengeance. He believed that God would take vengeance, but that the saints should not. He promoted compromise on the question of polygamy, stating he thought the number of wives a man had was not important, as long as the family obeyed God. The group made no decision on the issue. David Joris remained on the "mystic" edge of Anabaptism, leading by citing dreams, visions and prophecies. Against this is his rationalist approach to the topic of the devil and supernatural evil. David Joris anticipated the views of Thomas Hobbes, John Epps and John Thomas in interpreting the devil as an allegory. He adapted in his own interest the theory of three dispensations: the old, with its revelation of the Father, the newer with its revelations of the Son, and the final or era of the Spirit.

For a time he was a theological combatant with emerging leader Menno Simons. Menno considered Joris a compromiser; Joris thought Menno excessively literal. Joris moved to Basel in 1544 and protected himself by living under the assumed name Johann van Brugge. He joined the Reformed Church, but he continued his theological writings on Anabaptism. This reflects both his opinion that "to the pure all things are pure", and his developing view that external symbols were less important than inner faith.

His wife Dirckgen died 22 August 1556. David died three days later and was buried in the church of St Leonard, Basel. Anabaptist leader Nicolas van Blesdijk, the husband of his eldest daughter, became an opponent of Joris' teachings. In 1559 he revealed Joris' theology to the authorities of Basel. David Joris was posthumously convicted of heresy, and his body exhumed and burned on 13 May 1559. A portrait of Joris, by the Dutch painter Jan van Scorel, is now displayed in the Oeffentliche Kunstsammlung at Basel.

The Mennonite Encyclopedia divides Joris' religious career into "four overlapping phases: Sacramentarian (1524–1530); Melchiorite sympathizer (1531–1534) Anabaptist leader (1534–c. 1543); and Spiritualist (c. 1540–1556)." In addition to his spiritualism, Joris developed nicodemite practices from 1534 on.

== Works ==
His writings, all in Dutch, flowed in a continuous stream from 1524 (though none is extant before 1529) and amounted to over 200 in number. His magnum opus was 'T Wonder Boeck (n.d. 1542, divided into two parts; 1551, handsomely reprinted, divided into four parts; both editions anonymous). Its chief claim to recognition is its use, in the latter part, of the phrase Restitutio Christi, which apparently suggested to Servetus his title Christianismi Restitutio (1553). In the first edition is a figure of the "new man," signed with the author's monogram, and probably drawn as a likeness of himself; it fairly corresponds with the alleged portrait, engraved in 1607, reproduced in the appendix to Alexander Ross's Pansebeia (1655), and idealized by P. Burckhardt in 1900. Another work, Verklaringe der Scheppenissen (1553) treats mystically the Book of Genesis, a favourite theme with Böhme, Swedenborg and others.
