= Menno Simons =

Dutch theologian, namesake for the Mennonites (1496–1561)

The Reverend Menno Simons
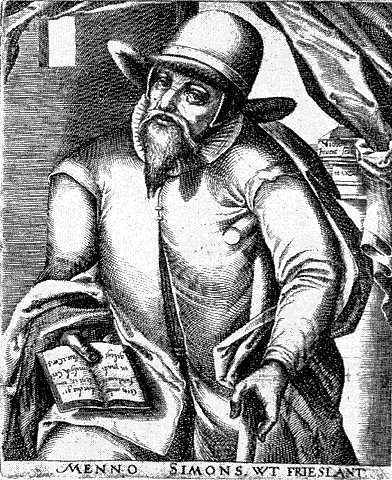
- "Menno Simons from Friesland"; 1608 engraving by Christoffel van Sichem
- Church: Mennonites

Personal details
- Born: 1496 Witmarsum, Friesland, Holy Roman Empire
- Died: 31 January 1561 (aged 64 or 65) Wüstenfelde, Duchy of Holstein, Holy Roman Empire
- Buried: Bad Oldesloe
- Denomination: Catholic (until 1536), Anabaptist (from 1536)
- Spouse: Geertruydt Jansdochter
- Children: Two daughters, one son
- Profession: Catholic priest (until 1536), Anabaptist minister and author (from 1536)

Menno Simons (Dutch: [ˈmɛnoː ˈsimɔns]; West Frisian: Minne Simens [ˈmɪnə ˈsimə̃ːs]; 1496 – 31 January 1561) was a Roman Catholic priest from the Friesland region of the Low Countries who renounced the Catholic Church and became an influential Anabaptist religious leader. Simons was a contemporary of the Protestant Reformers and it is from his name that his followers became known as Mennonites.

== Biography ==
=== Early life ===
Menno Simons was born in 1496 in Witmarsum, Friesland, Holy Roman Empire. Very little is known concerning his childhood and family except that he grew up in a poor peasant environment. His father's name was Simon, Simons being a patronym, and he had a brother named Pieter.

Simons grew up in a disillusioned war-torn country. Friesland was ravaged by war in the late 15th and early 16th centuries. Landsknecht soldiers haunted the Frisian lands in the 1490s to force the 'Free' Frisians to accept the Duke of Saxony-Meissen as their head of state. The duke was the governor of the Netherlands for the Habsburg family. One of the archenemies of the Habsburgs, the Duke of Guelders, invaded Friesland in 1515 and conquered half of it. Saxony ceded the other half to the Habsburgs. The Frisians tried to regain their freedom but they were too weak and eventually accepted the imperial authority of the Habsburg emperor Charles V.

Simons learned Latin and some Greek, and he was taught about the Latin Church Fathers during his training to become a priest. He had never read the Bible, either before or during his training for the priesthood, out of fear that he would be adversely influenced by it. When he later reflected upon this period in his life, he called himself stupid.

=== Priesthood and brother's death ===
He was ordained as a Roman Catholic priest in 1515 or 1516 in Utrecht. He was then appointed chaplain in his father's village Pingjum (1524).

Around 1526 or 1527, questions surrounding the doctrine of transubstantiation caused Menno Simons to begin a serious and in-depth search of the Holy Scriptures, which he confessed he had not previously studied, despite being a priest. Menno was not satisfied with the inconsistent answers which he got from Martin Luther, Martin Bucer and Heinrich Bullinger; he resolved to rely on Scripture alone, and from this time describes his preaching as "evangelical", not "sacramental".

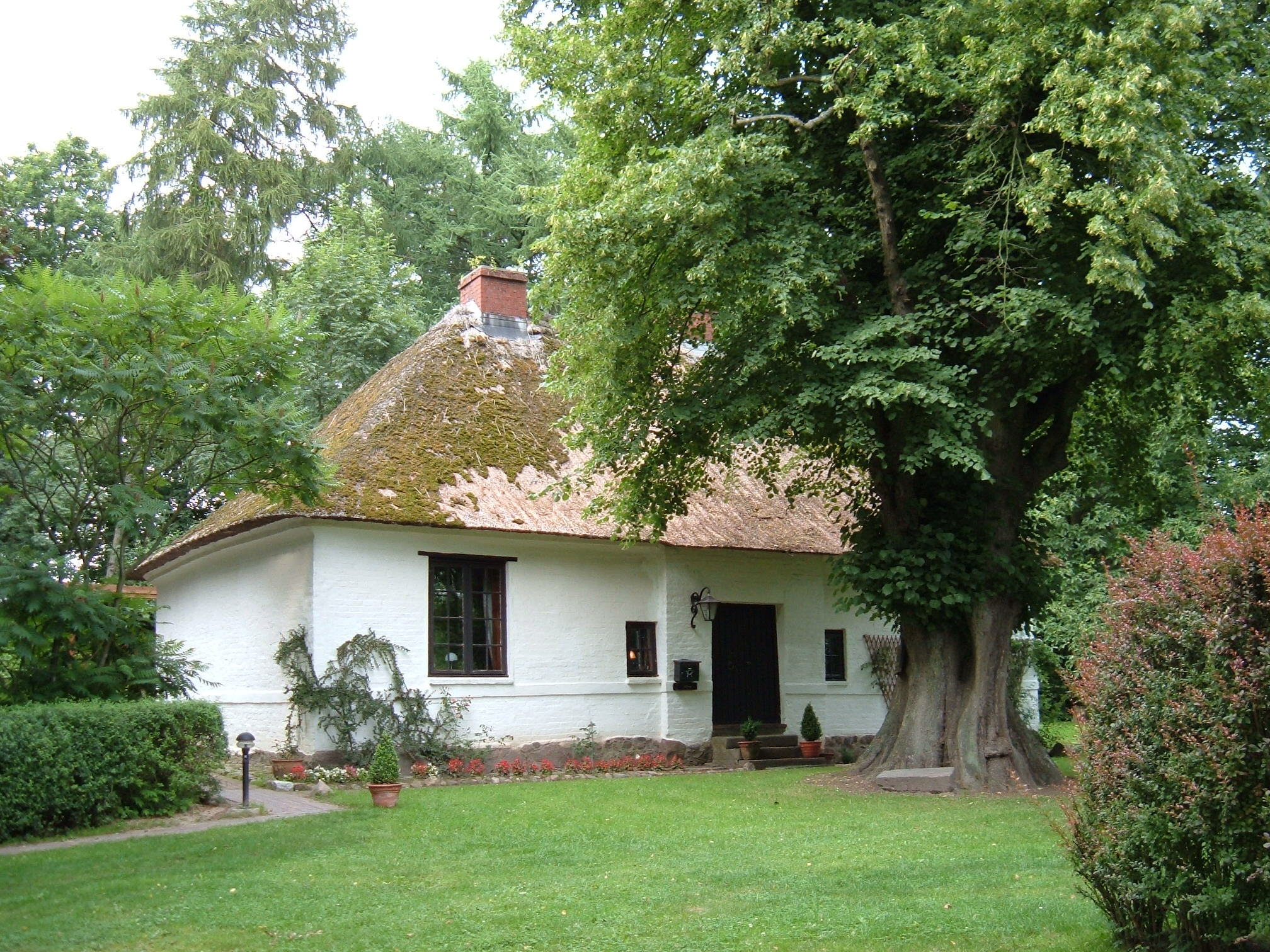
The house near Bad Oldesloe in which Simons is believed to have worked

Menno's first knowledge of the concept of "rebaptism", which he said "sounded very strange to me", came in 1531 after hearing of the beheading of Sicke Freerks Snijder at Leeuwarden for being "rebaptized" ("Snijder", meaning "tailor", was probably not the family name, since Freerks is the patronym form of Freerk and Sicke was, in fact, a tailor by trade). A renewed search of the scriptures left Menno Simons believing that infant baptism is not in the Bible. He discussed the issue with his pastor, searched the Church Fathers, and read the works of Martin Luther and Heinrich Bullinger. At some point, he also read some of Erasmus of Rotterdam's writings, which affected his views of Christian life and church. While still pondering the issue, he was transferred to Witmarsum. Here he came into direct contact with Anabaptists, preaching and practicing "believer's baptism". Later, some of the Münsterite disciples came there as well. While he regarded them as misled and fanatical, he was drawn to their zeal and their views of the Bible, the Church, and discipleship.

In 1535, his brother Pieter was among a group of Anabaptists killed near Bolsward because of his participation in the violent takeover of a Catholic monastery known as the Oldeklooster (or Bloemkamp Abbey). This monastery, near Bolsward in the Dutch province of Friesland, was seized on 30 March 1535 by about 300 Anabaptists of Friesland, both men and women, led by Jan van Geelen, an emissary of the Anabaptists of Münster. They thereby won a strong position and from here tried to conquer the entire province. The imperial stadholder Georg Schenck van Toutenburg was put in charge of capturing the old monastery from the Anabaptists. He supposed that he would be able to do so easily, but found himself compelled to conduct a regular siege. On 1 April he decided to bombard the monastery with heavy artillery and tried to storm it, leading his soldiers in four assaults. On the third they succeeded in taking several positions, although some of the fortifications and the church remained in Anabaptist possession. On 7 April the monastery was finally stormed after a severe battle. 300 Anabaptists were killed. Of the ones who did not lose their lives in the attack, 37 were then beheaded and 132, both men and women, taken to Leeuwarden, where another 55 were executed after a short trial. Jan van Geelen escaped.

After the death of his brother Pieter, Menno experienced a spiritual and mental crisis. He said he "prayed to God with sighs and tears that He would give to me, a sorrowing sinner, the gift of His grace, create within me a clean heart, and graciously through the merits of the crimson blood of Christ, He would graciously forgive my unclean walk and unprofitable life..."

=== Anabaptists ===
Menno Simons rejected the Catholic Church and the priesthood on 12 January 1536, casting his lot with the Anabaptists. The exact date of his new baptism is unknown, but he was probably baptized not long after leaving Witmarsum in early 1536. By October 1536 his connection with Anabaptism was well known, because it was in that month that Herman and Gerryt Jansz were arrested, charged and beheaded for having lodged Simons. He was ordained around 1537 by Obbe Philips. Obbe and his brother, Dirk Philips, were among the peaceful disciples of Melchior Hoffman (the more radical of Hoffman's followers having participated in the Münster Rebellion). It was Hoffman who introduced the first self-sustaining Anabaptist congregation in the Netherlands, when he taught and practiced believers' baptism in Emden in East Frisia. Menno Simons rejected the violence advocated by the Münster movement, believing it was not Scriptural. His theology was focused on separation from this world, and baptism by repentance symbolized this.

For true evangelical faith is of such a nature that it cannot lie dormant; but manifests itself in all righteousness and works of love; it dies unto flesh and blood; destroys all forbidden lusts and desires; cordially seeks, serves and fears God; clothes the naked; feeds the hungry; consoles the afflicted; shelters the miserable; aids and consoles all the oppressed; returns good for evil; serves those that injure it; prays for those that persecute it; teaches, admonishes and reproves with the Word of the Lord; seeks that which is lost; binds up that which is wounded; heals that which is diseased and saves that which is sound. The persecution, suffering and anxiety which befalls it for the sake of the truth of the Lord, is to it a glorious joy and consolation.

— Menno Simons, Why I Do Not Cease Teaching and Writing, 1539

Menno evidently rose quickly to become a man of influence. Before 1540, David Joris, an Anabaptist of the "inspirationist" variety, had been the most influential leader in the Netherlands. By 1544, the term Mennonite or Mennist was used in a letter to refer to the Dutch Anabaptists. Twenty-five years after his renunciation of Catholicism, Menno died on 31 January 1561 at Wüstenfelde, Holstein, and was buried in his garden. He was married to a woman named Gertrude, and they had at least three children, two daughters and a son. Only one daughter outlived him.

== Theology ==
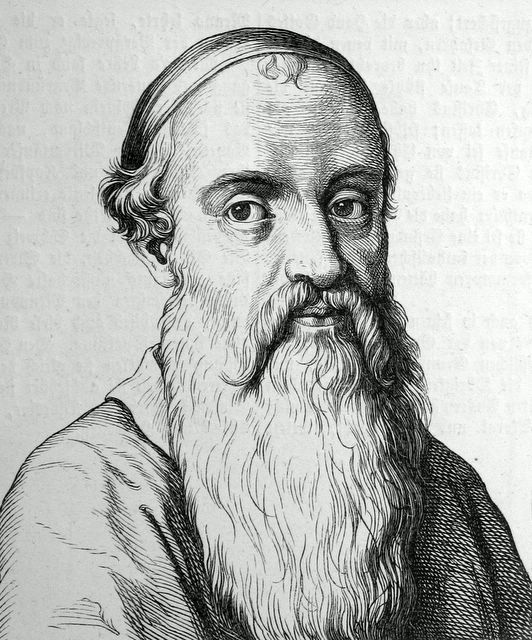
Menno Simons (1854)

Menno Simons' influence on Anabaptism in the Low Countries was so great that Baptist historian William Estep suggested that their history be divided into three periods: "before Menno, under Menno, and after Menno". Menno is especially significant because of his coming to the Anabaptist movement in the north in its most troublesome days, and helping not only to sustain it, but also to establish it as a viable Radical Reformation movement.

=== Incarnation ===
Menno believed that Jesus had a "heavenly flesh" instead of taking on human flesh and blood from Mary. He said that Christ was "conceived not of her womb but in her womb". Menno appealed to scientific theory to bolster his arguments, although he lacked scientific training.

=== Excommunication ===
Girolimon (1995) compares the teachings of Menno Simons with those of Protestant reformer John Calvin (1509–64), focusing on the issue of excommunication. This theological analysis stresses sharp contrasts between the two leaders on four basic principles: on procedures leading to excommunication, on the severity of sanctions on the excommunicant, on the restoration of a repentant individual, and on civil punishment. Calvin and Menno, each a leader of distinct wings of the Reformation, both believed this extreme form of discipline to be essential to the function of the church in society, agreeing on the basic grounds for excommunication as expressed in the New Testament. Menno, however, envisioned the application of reprimand as a process administered by the entire church body against any sin; Calvin reserved excommunication for especially severe transgressions as identified by the Company of Pastors and the Consistory. Among other disagreements, Calvin approved civil punishment for certain forms of unorthodoxy while Menno advocated strict church/state separation. They differed most profoundly in their views on why church discipline was necessary. Simons saw human perfectability as attainable after conversion, while Calvin stressed an Augustinian theology of human depravity.

=== Bride of Christ ===
Menno Simons drew heavily from Biblical images of the bride of Christ when envisioning a new church. He found in the Biblical Song of Solomon a description of the relationship between a purified church and Christ that not only applied to a reformed church but also to the earthly marriage between man and woman. Like the bride in the songs, the woman must come in total love and devotion and will be cleansed of her natural evil by contact with her husband. He did not alter the conventional view of relations between men and women but idealized the woman's role.

=== Infant baptism ===
The Anabaptists insisted on believer's (normally adult) baptism. By contrast, Martin Luther defended infant baptism; his belief in it stemmed from his view of the church as ideally an inclusive reality in a Christian society. Menno Simons based his rejection of infant baptism on the concept of the church as a disciplined group of individuals who have voluntarily committed their lives to Christ. He viewed sanctification as a lifelong process that does not completely rid the presence of sin from one's life.

=== Peace ===
Although some Anabaptists in Amsterdam and Münster in the 16th century engaged in violence and murder, Dutch Mennonites generally became pious and peaceful. In his 1539 Christian Baptism Menno Simons stated his reluctance to engage in disputes, which may have stemmed from his reluctance for years to announce his true convictions. Simons' relationships with the radical Münsterites and peaceful Melchiorites may offer additional clues.

=== Asceticism ===
Menno Simons rejected asceticism in terms of its traditional practices of social withdrawal, mortification, and self-denial. Historical theologian Richard Valantasis, however, has suggested that asceticism should not be defined as these physical practices but as a group of activities designed to re-establish social relations between the individual and the dominant social environment through a new subjectivity, different social relations, and an alternative symbolic universe. Simons' theology is ascetic by Valantasis's definition since it used these methods to restructure Anabaptists' relationship with 'worldly' society.

== Works ==
- Van de Geestlijke Verrijsenisse (ca. 1536; The Spiritual Resurrection)
- De nieuwe Creatuere (ca. 1537; The New Birth)
- Christelycke leringhen op den 25. Psalm (ca. 1538; Meditation on the Twenty-Fifth Psalm)
- Why I Do Not Cease Teaching and Writing (1539)
- Dat Fundament des Christelycken leers (1539–40; Foundation of Christian Doctrine)
