= Dirk Philips =

Mennonite theologian from Friesland

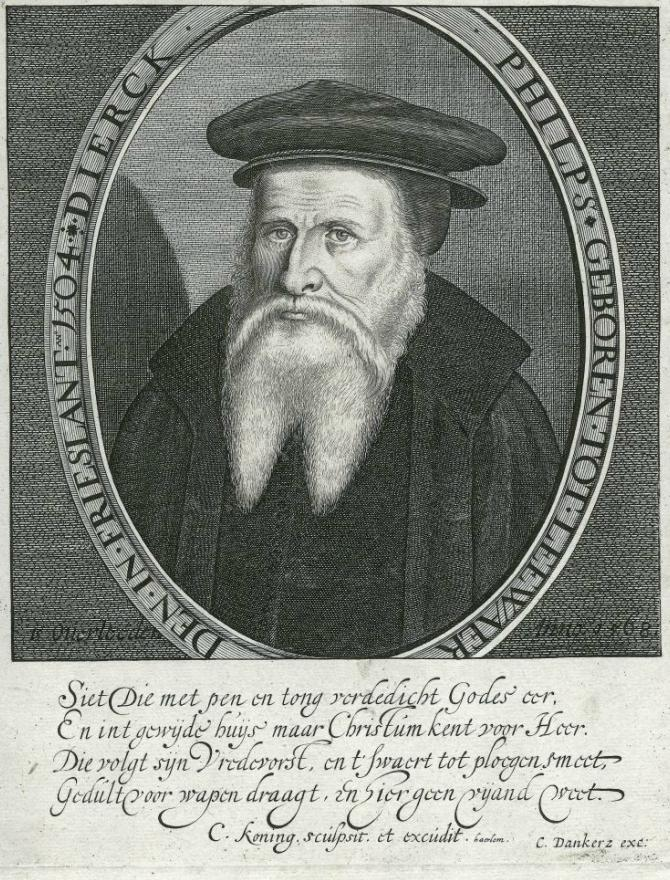
- Born: 1504; Leeuwarden, Lordship of Frisia
- Died: 1568; Het Falder, Prince-Bishopric of Münster
- Occupation(s): Anabaptist writer and theologian

Dirk Philips (1504–1568) was an early Anabaptist writer and theologian. He was one of the peaceful disciples of Melchior Hoffman and later joined Menno Simons in laying out practical doctrines for what would become the Mennonite church.

== Biography ==
Dirk Philips was born in Leeuwarden in 1504, the son of a priest (it was not uncommon at the time for a priest to have unofficial wives and families). He was a Franciscan friar. He joined the Anabaptist Brotherhood in 1533 and became an elder in 1534. In 1537, he was named one of the outstanding Anabaptist leaders. In 1561, he was described as an old man, not very tall, with a grey beard and white hair. He died in Het Falder in 1568.

== Beliefs ==
He was the leading theologian of his time among Dutch Mennonites. He was known to be very systematic in his thinking, and very strict and unwavering in his beliefs. There were two key themes to his theology: the word of scripture, and the word incarnate in Jesus. Like other Anabaptists, he gave Christ pre-eminence.

He identifies seven ordinances and commandments that must be maintained to be recognized as an authentic church:

- Pure, unfalsified teaching of the divine Word by true ministers
- Scriptural use of the sacraments, baptism and the Lord's Supper
- Washing the feet of the saints
- Separation of sinners (the ban and shunning)
- Command of love one for another
- Keeping all the commandments of Christ Jesus
- Suffering and persecution is expected for all Christians

He believed in strict adherence to the ban or shunning. This is when open sinners are expelled from the church until they repent. He felt this was necessary in order to maintain the purity of the church. His emphasis on the ban and the purity of the community makes Dirk Philips' writings more popular with the Old Order Amish. He believed in the absolute opposition between the church and the world, and therefore that believers should expect persecution.

== See also ==
- Enchiridion of Dietrich Philips
