= Witmarsum, Netherlands =

Witmarsum Wytmarsum
- Village
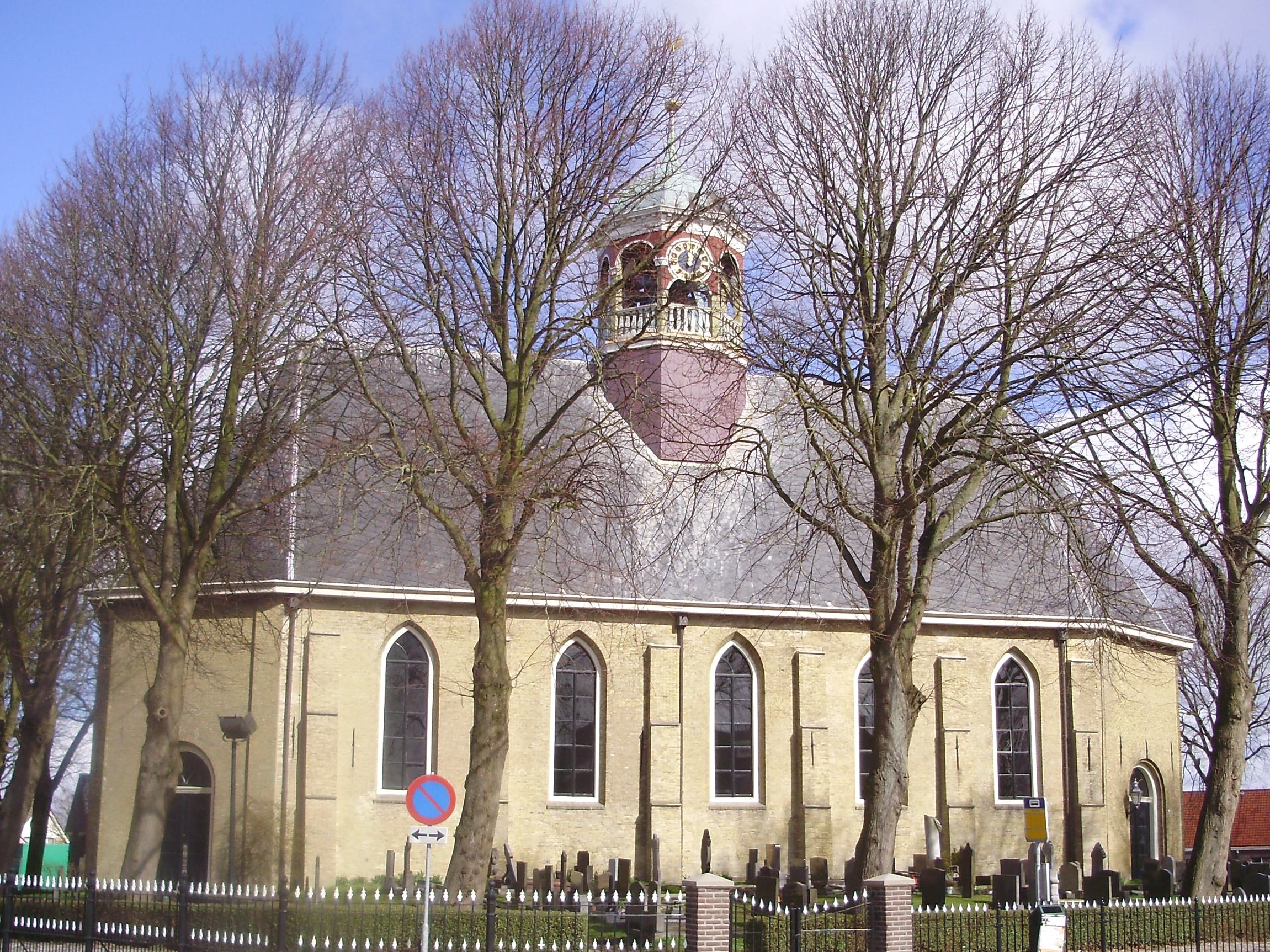
- Witmarsum church

- Flag Coat of arms

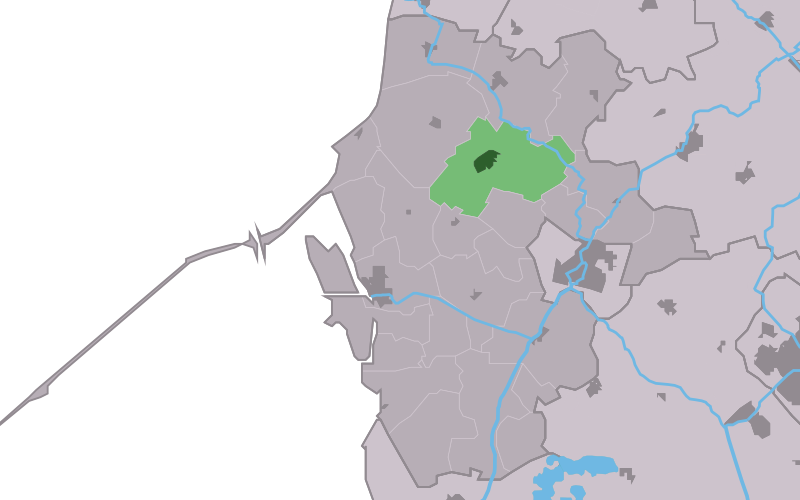
- Location in the former Wûnseradiel municipality

- Location in the Netherlands Witmarsum (Netherlands)
- Country: Netherlands
- Province: Friesland
- Municipality: Súdwest-Fryslân

Area
  - Total: 12.78 km^{2} (4.93 sq mi)
- Elevation: 0.5 m (1.6 ft)

Population (2021)
  - Total: 1,675
  - Density: 131.1/km^{2} (339.5/sq mi)
- Time zone: UTC+1 (CET)
  - Summer (DST): UTC+2 (CEST)
- Postal code: 8748
- Dialing code: 0517

Witmarsum (West Frisian: Wytmarsum) is a village in the northern Netherlands. It is located in Súdwest-Fryslân, Friesland. Witmarsum had a population of around 1,735 in January 2017. Witmarsum was birthplace of Menno Simons (1496–1561), the leader of what would become the Mennonites.

== History ==
The village was first mentioned in the 13th century as Witmarsum, and means "settlement of Witmer (person)". Witmarsum is a terp (artificial living hill) village which developed in the early middle ages. The village used to concentrate on the terp, along the canal and along the road from Bolsward to Harlingen.

The Dutch Reformed church was built in 1633 as a replacement of its medieval predecessor, because it was damaged by a lightning strike. The tower was again replaced in 1819. Witmarsum contains four churches: a Dutch Reformed church, a Catholic church, a former Reformed Church and a modest Mennonite church.

Witmarsum was home to 659 people in 1840. In 1879, an obelisk was erected as a memorial for Menno Simons. In 1880, Witmarsum became the capital of the municipality of Wûnseradiel. In 1911, an electricity factory was opened by a local electricity company for the villages of Witmarsum, Pingjum, Arum en Achlum. In 1919, Witmarsum was connected to the provincial grid, and the building was turned into a transformer.

There are two windmills in the village, De Onderneming and De Pankoekstermolen. Before 2011, the village was part of the Wûnseradiel municipality.

== Notable people ==
- Menno Simons (1496–1561), the leader of the Mennonites
- Hobbe Smith (1862–1942), painter, watercolorist

== Gallery ==
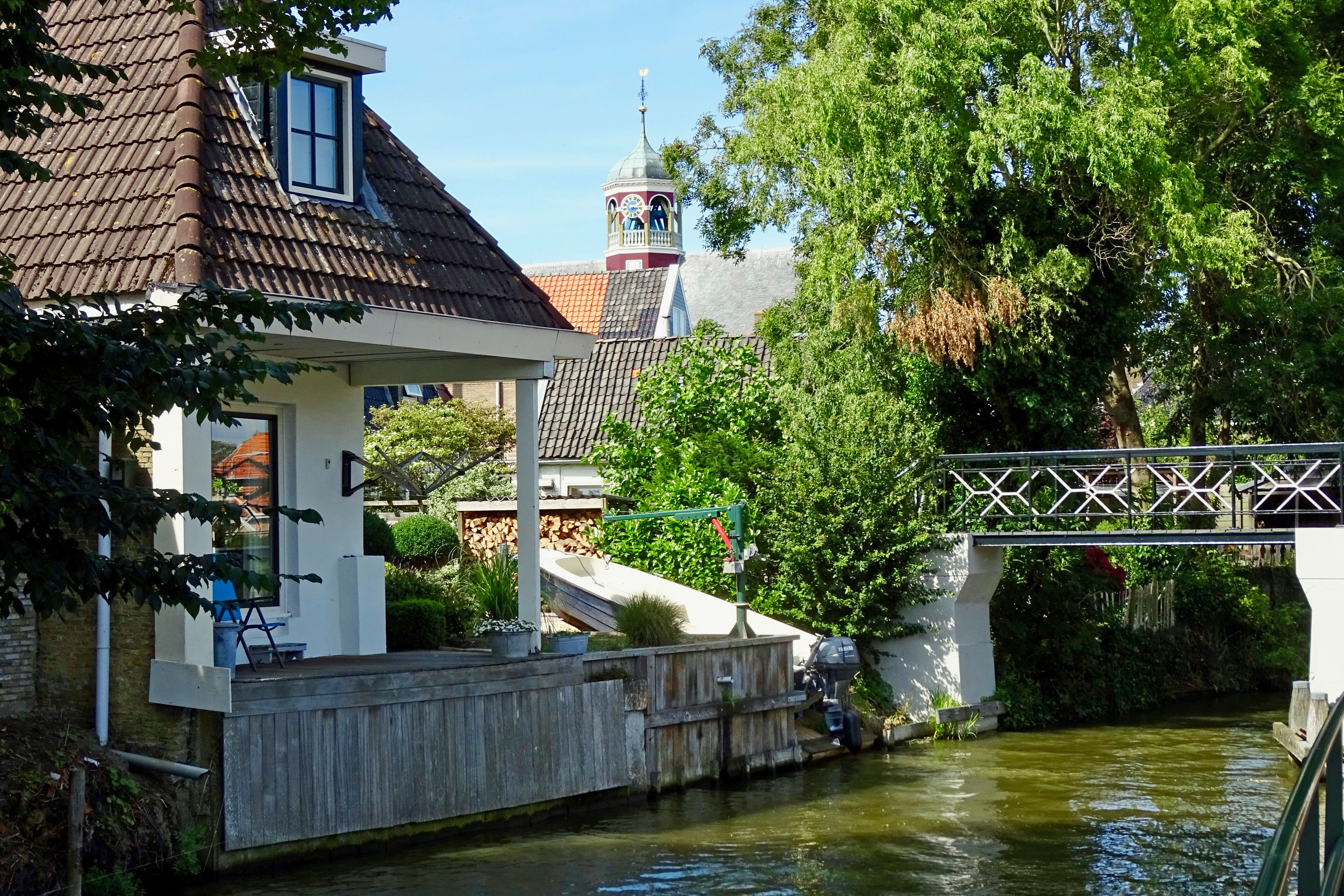
Canal view

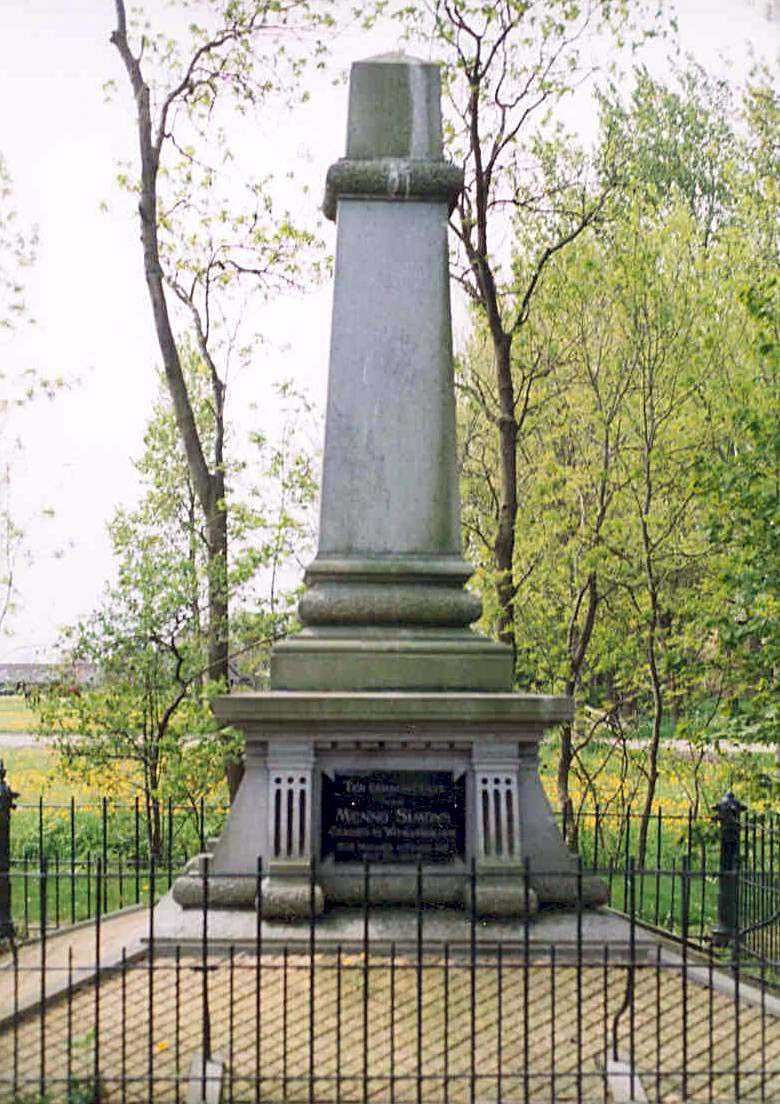
Menno Simons monument.

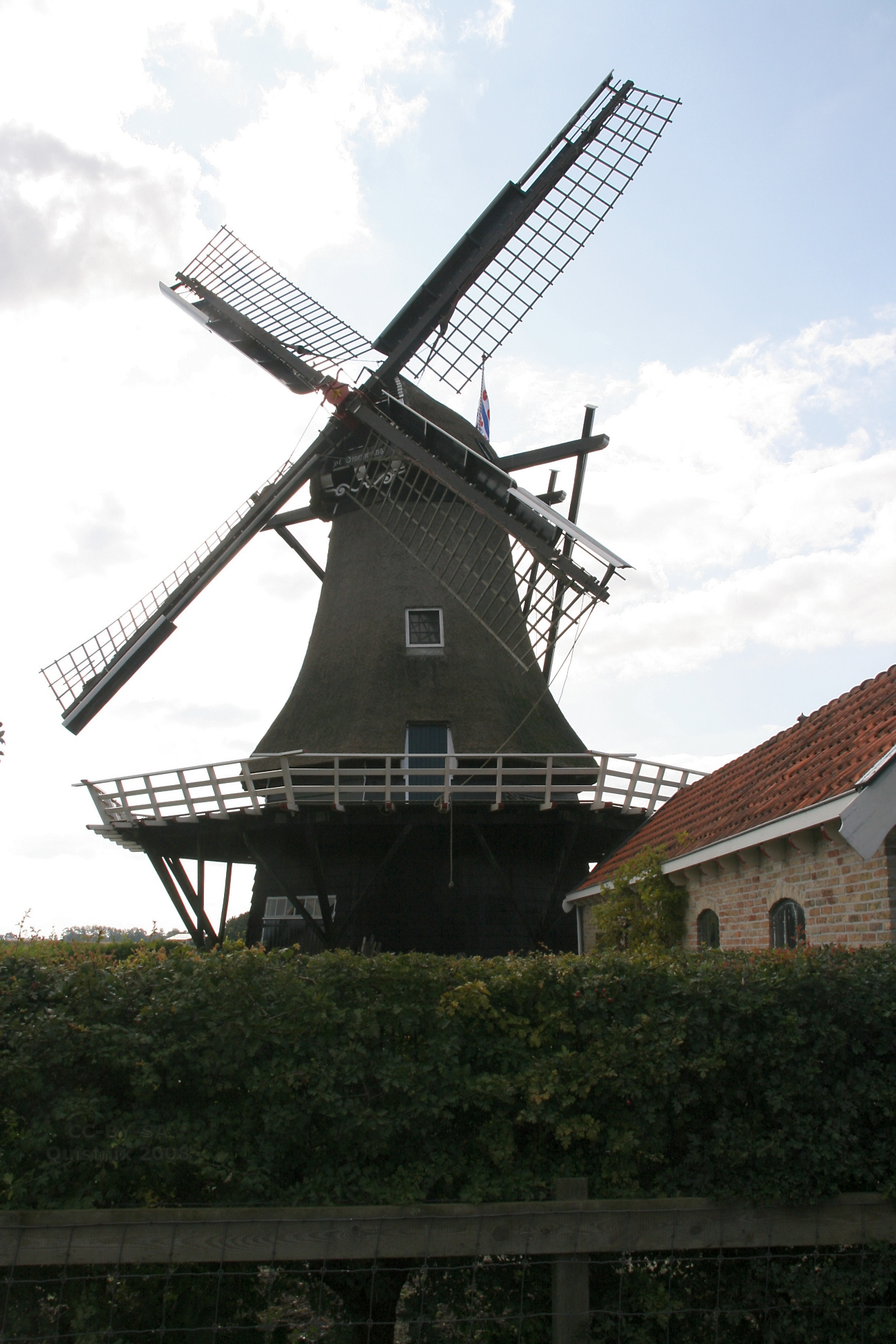
Windmill De Onderneming in Witmarsum

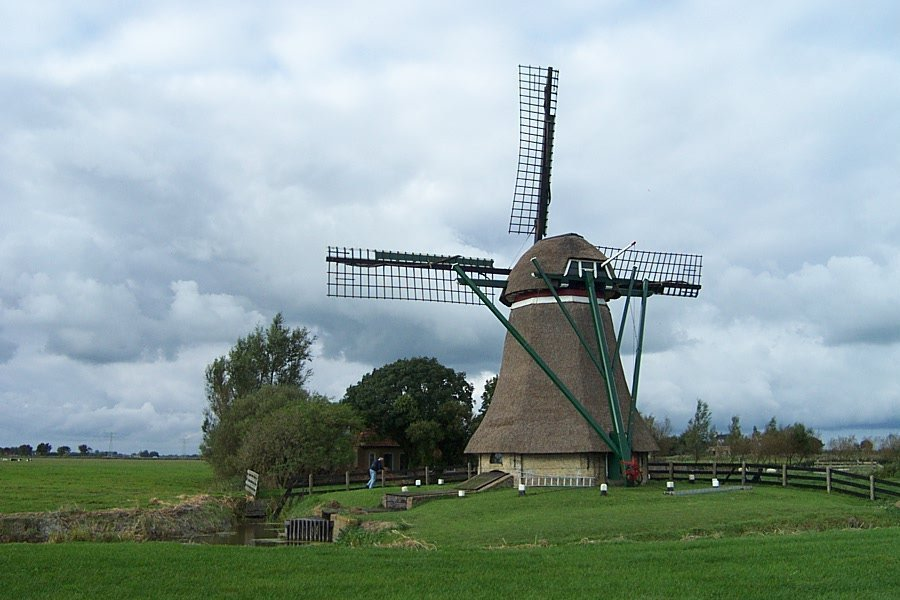
De Pankoekstermolen
