= Witmarsum, Santa Catarina =

Witmarsum
- Municipality
- Flag Coat of arms

- Location in Santa Catarina, Brazil

- Location in Brazil
- Coordinates: 26°55′40″S 49°47′45″W
- Country: Brazil
- Region: South
- State: Santa Catarina

Government
  - Mayor: César Panini (PSD)

Area
  - Total: 153.776 km^{2} (59.373 sq mi)
- Elevation: 370 m (1,210 ft)

Population (2020)
  - Total: 3,998
  - Density: 26.00/km^{2} (67.34/sq mi)
- Time zone: UTC-3 (UTC-3)
  - Summer (DST): UTC-2 (UTC-2)
- Postal code: 4219408
- Website: witmarsum.sc.gov.br

Witmarsum is a municipality in the state of Santa Catarina in the South region of Brazil.

== See also ==
- List of municipalities in Santa Catarina
- Witmarsum Colony, Paraná, founded in 1951 by Mennonites from the Krauel valley
