= Vierpolders =

- Village
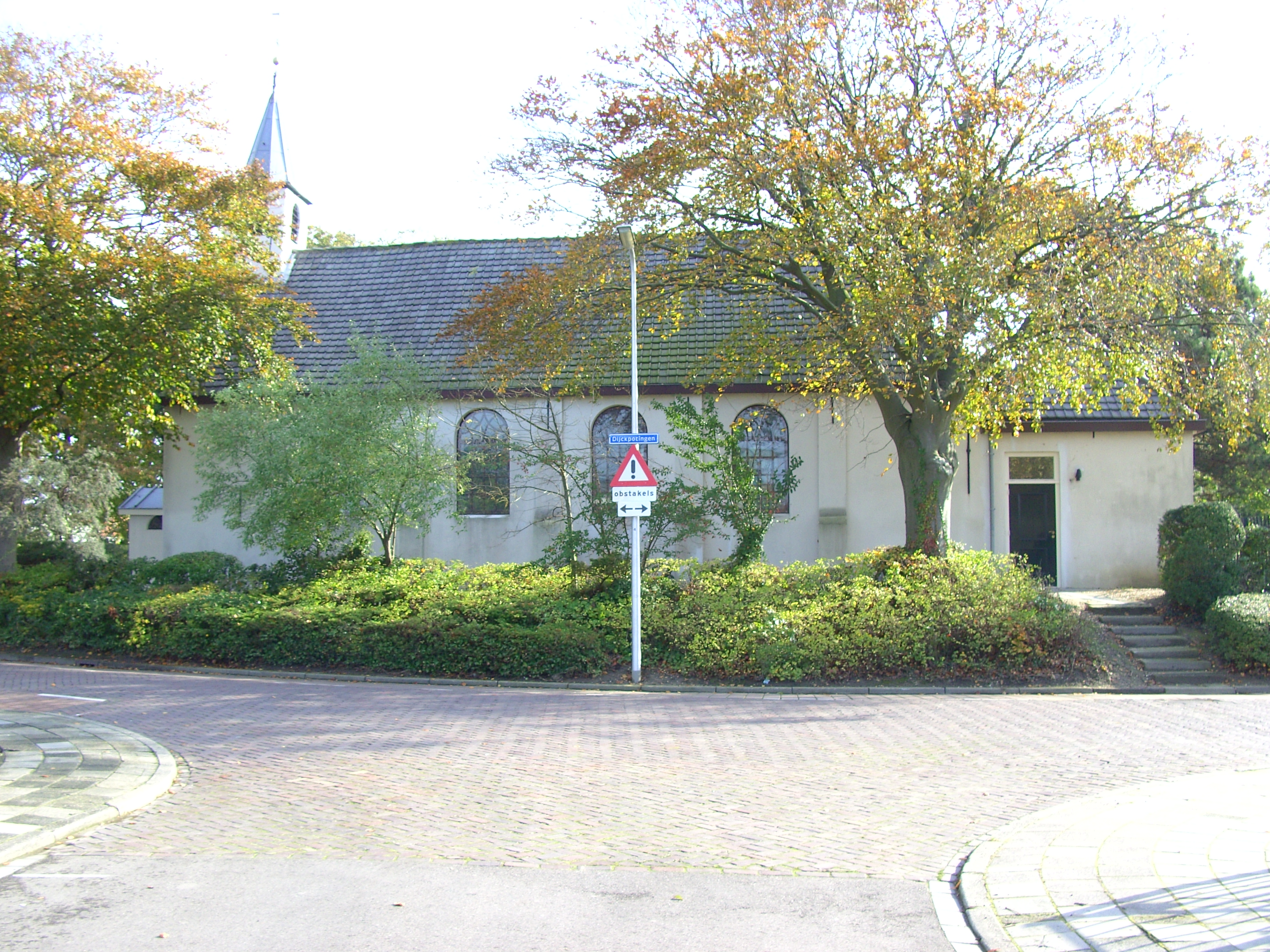
- Dutch Reformed church

- Coat of arms

- Location in the province of South Holland in the Netherlands Location in the Netherlands
- Coordinates: 51°53′N 4°11′E
- Country: Netherlands
- Province: South Holland
- Municipality: Voorne aan Zee

Area
  - Total: 10.37 km^{2} (4.00 sq mi)
- Elevation: −0.7 m (−2.3 ft)

Population (2021)
  - Total: 1,820
  - Density: 176/km^{2} (455/sq mi)
- Time zone: UTC+1 (CET)
  - Summer (DST): UTC+2 (CEST)
- Postal code: 3237
- Dialing code: 0181

Vierpolders is a village in the Dutch province of South Holland. It is a part of the municipality of Voorne aan Zee, and lies about 5 km north of Hellevoetsluis.

The name of the village, literally "four polders", refers to the municipality, that consisted of the polders Nieuwland, Veckhoek, Oud-Helvoet, and Oude-Gote. The village and the municipality were previously also named "Nieuwland". The village was first mentioned in 1843 as "de Vierpolders, gezegd Nieuwland".

The Dutch Reformed church was built in 1721 to replace a medieval church which was probably a wooden church. It was extended between 1857 and 1858. It is currently in use by a funeral home.

Vierpolders was a separate municipality between 1817 and 1980, when it became part of Brielle.

== Gallery ==
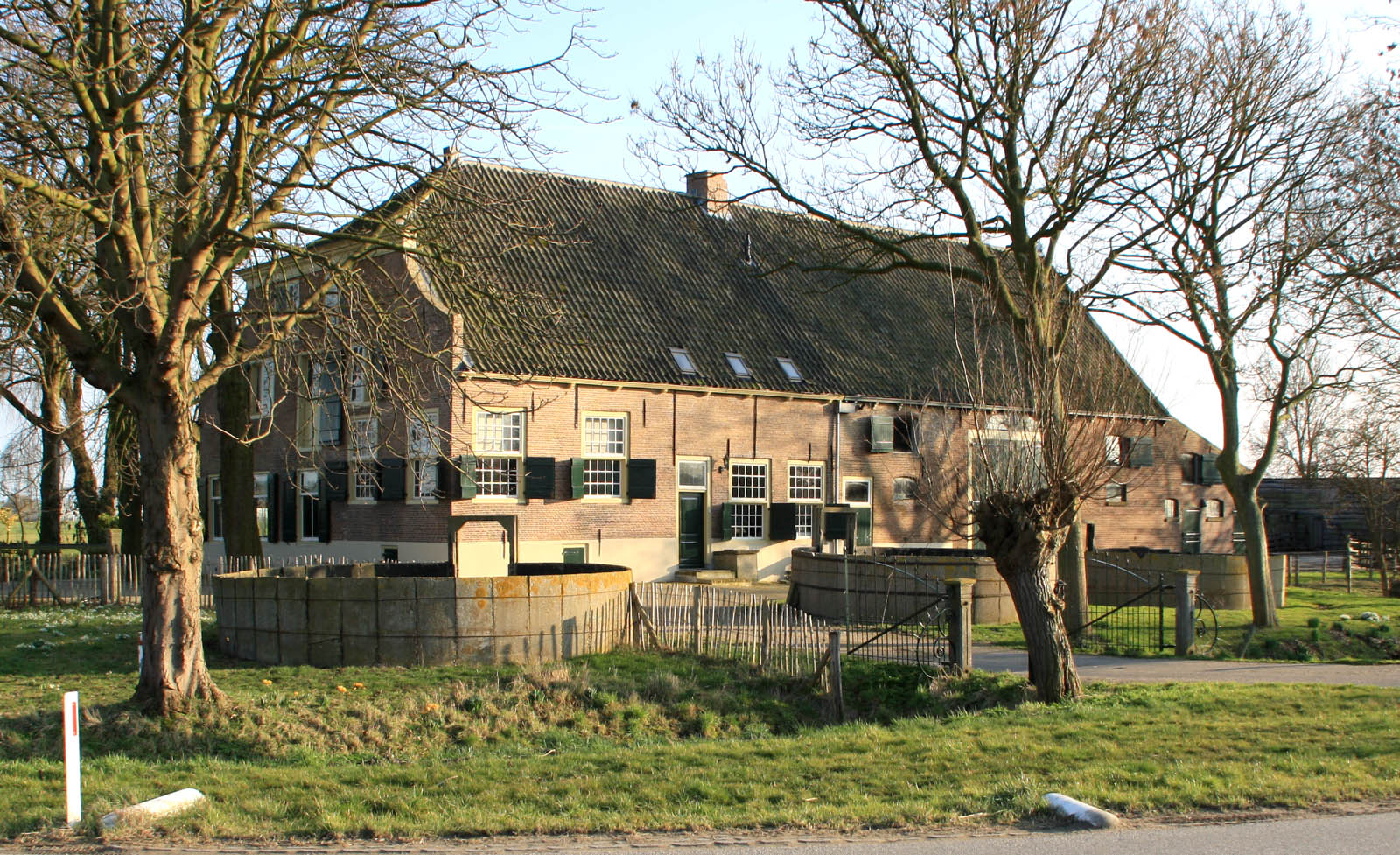
Farm Esterenburch

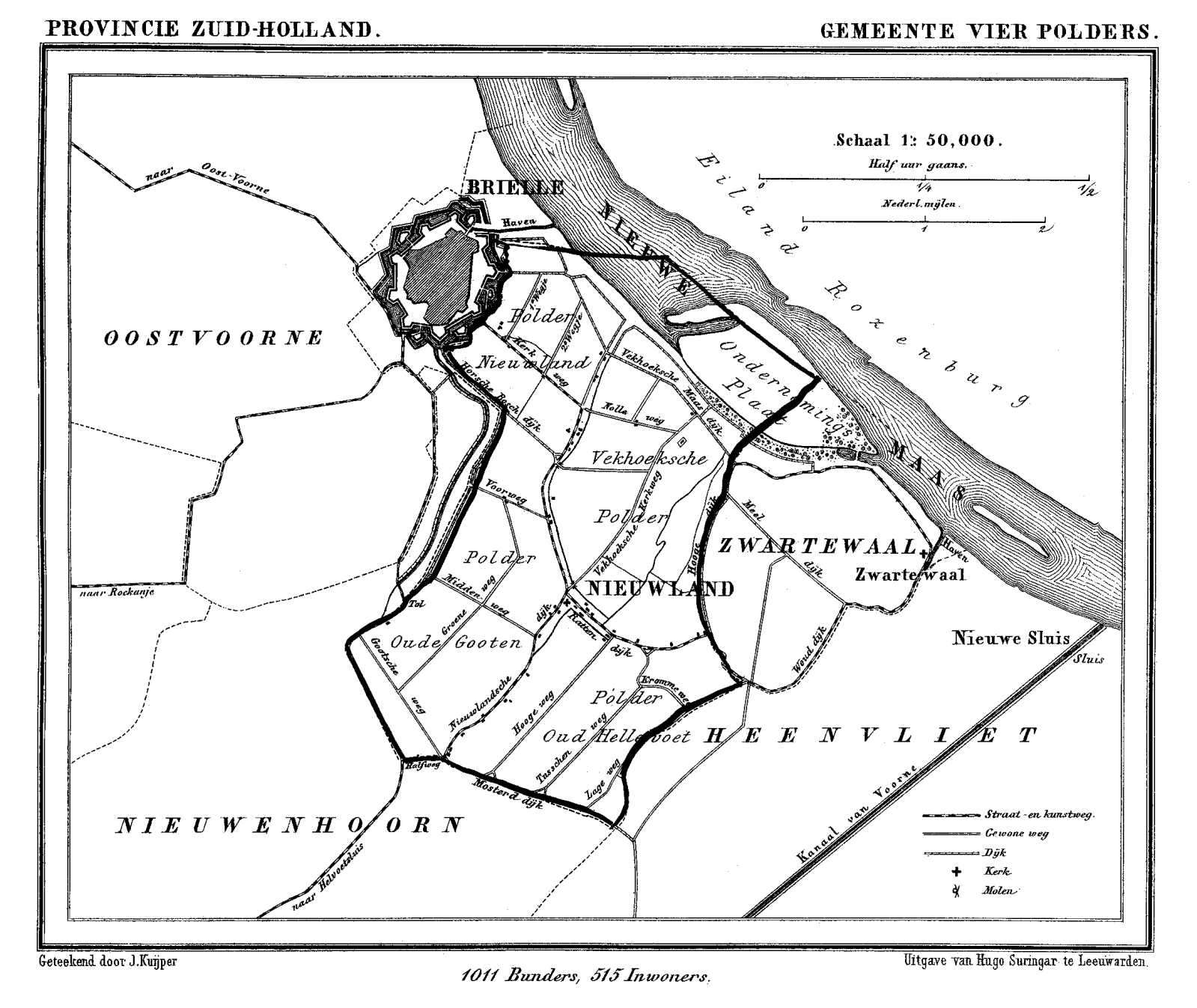
Vierpolders en omgeving uit: Gemeente Atlas van Nederland, J. Kuyper 1867
