= Melchior Hoffman =

Anabaptist leader

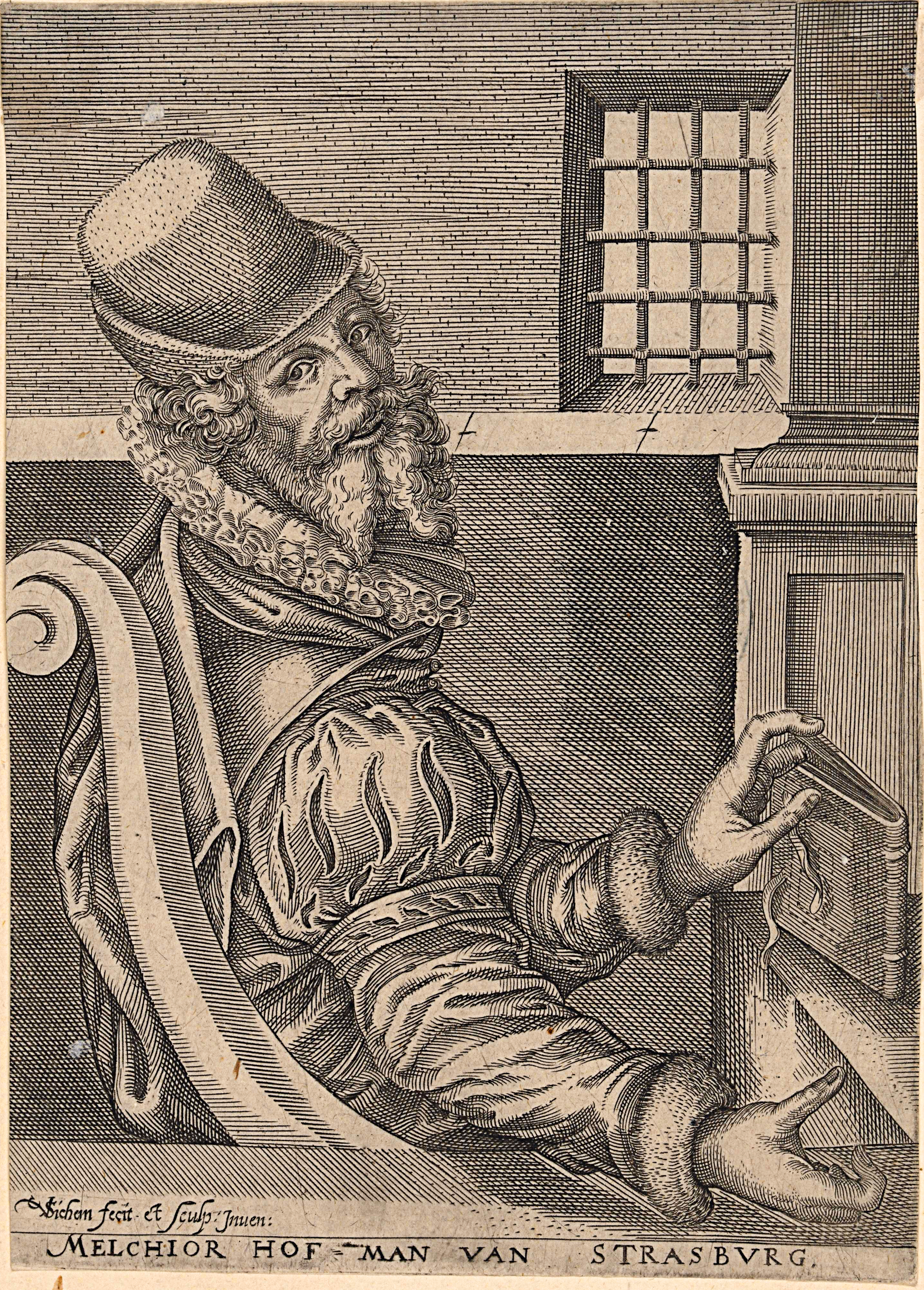
- Melchior Hofmann
- Born: 1495; Schwäbisch Hall, Free imperial city of Holy Roman Empire (today southwest Germany)
- Died: c. 1543; Strasbourg, Free imperial city of Holy Roman Empire (today France)
- Theological work
- Tradition or movement: Anabaptism

Melchior Hoffman (or Hofmann c. 1495 – c. 1543) was a German Anabaptist, radical lay preacher and reformer in northern Europe. He began his career as an outspoken proponent of Lutheranism but evolved his own theological voice influenced by late medieval mysticism, Joachimite apocalypticism, and the Anabaptist movement. He is credited with introducing Anabaptism to the Low Countries.

== Life ==
Hoffman was born at Schwäbisch Hall in southwest Germany before 1500. His biographers usually give his surname as Hofmann; in his printed works it sometimes appears as Hoffman, and in his manuscripts as Hoffmann.

He was without scholarly training, and first appeared as a furrier in Livonia. Attracted by Luther's teachings, he came forward as a lay preacher, combining business travels with a religious mission. He worked as a lay preacher in the cities of Wolmar (from 1523), Dorpat and Reval. In Dorpat he became involved in an iconoclastic revolt, and the magistrates obliged him to go to Wittenberg to obtain Luther's approval of his preaching. After his return to Dorpat he was involved in more controversy and forced to leave the city.

After the same thing happened in Reval, he decided to go to Stockholm, Sweden, where he arrived in the autumn of 1526. Here too he was involved in religious disturbances and so left Sweden again.

After a short stay in Lübeck he made his way to Denmark, where he found favour with King Frederick I, and was appointed by royal ordinance to preach the Gospel at Kiel. He was probably the first printer in the city. He was extravagant in his denunciations, and developed a Zwinglian view of the Eucharist.

Luther himself was alarmed at this. At a colloquy of preachers in Flensburg on (April 8, 1529), Hoffman, John Campanus and others were put on their defence. Hoffman maintained (against the "magic" of the Lutheran interpretation) that the function of the Eucharist, like that of preaching, is nothing more than an appeal for spiritual union with Christ. Refusing to retract, he was banished.

Making his way to Strasbourg in June 1529, he was well received, until his Anabaptist tendencies became apparent. He joined with the Anabaptists of the city, and, according to Estep, was rebaptized in April 1530.

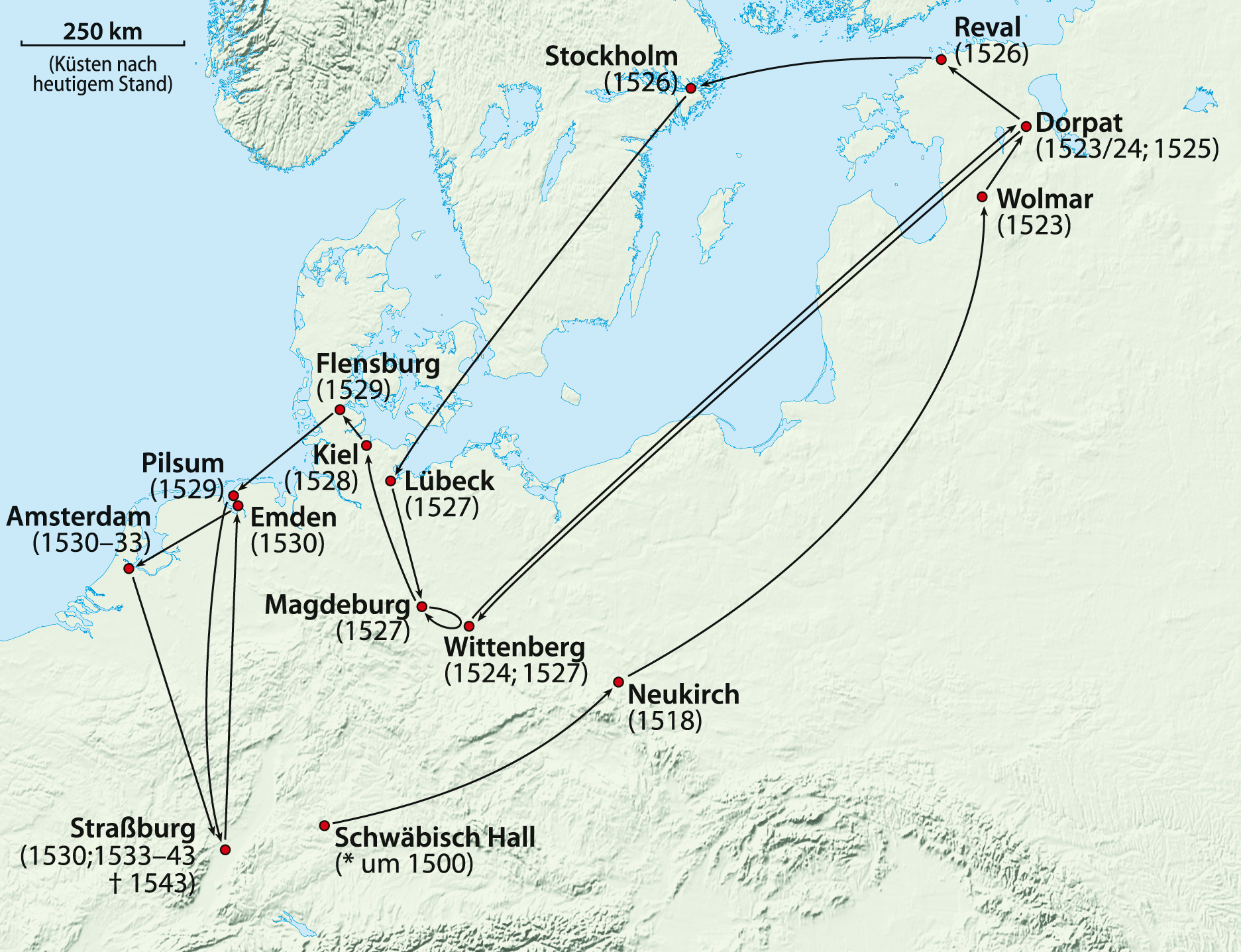
Travels of Melchior Hoffman

In May he travelled to East Frisia, where he established churches and baptized about 300 people. He was in relations with Kaspar Schwenkfeld and with Andreas Karlstadt, but assumed a prophetic role of his own. In 1532 he founded a community at Emden, securing a large following of artisans.

Because of the prophecy of an old man foretelling six months in prison for him, he returned in the spring of the following year to Strasbourg, where there is reference to his wife and child. He gained from his study of Apocalypse the belief that the Lord would return there in 1533 and received a vision of "resurrections" of apostolic Christianity, first under John Hus, and now under himself. The year 1533 was to inaugurate the new era; Strasbourg was to be the seat of the New Jerusalem.

When however he prophesied that the return of Christ would be preceded by a purging of the ungodly, Hoffman was seen as a revolutionary. Under examination, he denied that he had made common cause with the Anabaptists and claimed to be no prophet but a mere witness of the Most High, but nevertheless refused the articles of faith proposed to him by the provincial synod.

Hoffman's failed prophecy of the return of Christ contributed significantly to the Münster Rebellion (1534–1535), of which he is seen as one of the authors. Two of his followers, Jan van Matthijs and Jan van Leiden, proclaimed that Hoffman was wrong on the questions of the exact time and place, where Christ would return and reign, and named Münster as the correct location.

As a consequence of the terror inspired by the rebellion and its savage suppression, Hoffman, together with Claus Frey, another Anabaptist, was detained in prison. Although the synod made a further effort to reclaim him in 1539, he stayed there for the rest of his life, until his death in 1543.

== Teachings and influence ==
Hoffman was important in at least one aspect of the development of the Mennonites. He adopted the views of Schwenkfeld concerning the incarnation of Jesus, and taught what has been called the "heavenly flesh of Christ". Menno Simons accepted this view, probably received from the peaceful Melchiorites Obbe and Dirk Philips, and it became the general belief of Dutch Anabaptists in the first century of their existence.

Hoffman wrote a commentary on the Book of Daniel in 1526. Two of his publications with similar titles from 1530—"Weissagung aus heiliger gotlicher geschrift" (Prophecy from Holy and Divine Scripture) and "Prophecey oder Weissagung vsz warer heiliger gotlicher schrifft" (Prophecy from True, Holy and Divine Scripture)—are noteworthy as having influenced Menno Simons and David Joris. Bock treats him as an antitrinitarian, on grounds which Robert Wallace deems inconclusive. Trechsel includes him among pioneers of some of the positions of Servetus.

His followers were known as Hoffmanites or Melchiorites.
