= Manituana =

Novel by Wu Ming

- Verso hardcover edition
- Author: Wu Ming
- Original title: Manituana
- Translator: Shaun Whiteside
- Language: Italian
- Genre: Novel
- Publisher: Verso Books
- Publication date: 2009
- Media type: Print (Hardcover)
- Pages: 396 pp
- ISBN: 1-84467-342-1

Manituana is a novel by Wu Ming first published in Italian in 2007.

Wu Ming is a collective of five authors founded in 2000. The members were formerly associated with the Luther Blissett Project and wrote the international best-selling novel Q.

Manituana was initially conceived as the first episode of an 18th-century pan-Atlantic trilogy which the authors called "the Atlantic Triptych". All novels would be set in the last three decades of the 18th century, all across the Atlantic Ocean (North America, Europe, the West Indies and Africa), before and during the American and the French Revolutions.

In 2014, when L’Armata dei sonnambuli (The Army of Sleepwalkers) was published in Italy, the collective announced a new phase in their writing. They described historical fiction as "a form we practised for many years, until we decided to move on and use history in other ways […] We treasure what we have learned from exploring that genre and forcing its conventions, and we dedicate ourselves to new experiments”. In a comment on the group's official blog, Wu Ming stated that they had given up on the idea of completing the Atlantic Triptych, which became a diptych.

== Setting and plot ==
Manituana is set in the years 1775–1783 in New York's Mohawk Valley, Quebec, and London.

The novel is divided into three main sections entitled "Iroquireland", "Mohock Club" and "Cold Cold Heart". There are two brief interludes between the sections, entitled "The Crossing" and "The Return".

Among the numerous real historical characters that populate the book, the most important ones are Joseph Brant, war chief of the Mohawk nation, and Molly Brant, a matron of the Wolf clan in the Iroquois Six Nations.

== Characters ==
- Sir William Johnson, 1st Baronet. Superintendent of Indian Affairs for the northern colonies.
- Joseph Brant. Mohawk war chief and translator for the British Indian Department.
- Molly Brant. Joseph Brant's older sister and Sir William's common-law-wife.
- Philip Lacroix (fictional). A Mohawk brave nicknamed "Le Grand Diable"
- Guy Johnson. Sir William's nephew and successor as Superintendent.
- Esther Johnson. (Fictional) The eldest daughter of Guy Johnson.
- Lord Warwick. (Semi-fictional) mentor of the Mohawk delegation during their stay in London.
- The "London Mohocks". An East End street gang taking inspiration from Native American imagery and the Mohock Club.
- Ethan Allen. Revolutionary leader and Colonel Commandant of the Green Mountain Boys.
- Johannes Tekarihoga. A Sachem of the Mohawk Nation.
- Jonas Klug. A land-owner and militiaman in the Mohawk Valley.
- Nicholas Herkimer. Brigadier General in the Tryon County militia.
- Panifex. A London journalist.
- "North", "East", "South" and "West". Four London merchants and opinion-makers.

== Reactions and interpretations ==
In the springtime of 2007, Manituana reached #4 in the Italian best-seller charts. In the following months, it was awarded the Premio Sergio Leone 2007 and the Premio Emilio Salgari 2008. The US, UK, Spanish and French editions were all published in 2009. The novel was translated into English by Shaun Whiteside. In November 2010 the novel was nominated for the International Dublin Literary Award.

In an entry on their weblog, Wu Ming wrote that "Manituana was written between 2003 and 2007, and it soaked up all the tensions of that period: S11, the Neoconservative hegemony on US foreign policy, the lies on Saddam allegedly keeping weapons of mass destruction hidden in the desert, the wars in Afghanistan and Iraq, George W. Bush winning his second term thanks to the Christian right in 2004, Silvio Berlusconi conquering the hearts and minds of the majority of Italians etc."

This was acknowledged by many reviewers. Film critic and writer Woody Haut wrote that the novel "has clear parallels with the war in Iraq, and the pitting of "good" Muslims against "bad" Muslims, just as Native Americans were used during the revolutionary period, only for the colonists to exploit and devastate both groups."

British newspaper The Independent wrote

The authors gleefully revise orthodox history to present the loyalist Mohawks as victims of canting, racist rebels who march into battle under banners such as "Civilisation and death to all savages". But there is nothing smug or glib about this rivetting reversal of two centuries and more of textbook and big-screen platitudes.

The French newspaper Le Monde wrote that in Manituana "history is never simple nor reducible to pre-fixed schemes... Reality is much more complex and tangled, and every character has gloomy facets, weaknesses and contradictions. No-one is neither completely innocent nor completely guilty, and one's legitimate battle for liberty and independence may bring about the loss of someone else's independence and liberty."

== Editions ==
- Italian: Einaudi, 2007, ISBN 88-06-18584-5
- Italian: Einaudi SuperET (paperback), 2009, ISBN 88-06-19637-5
- English: Verso, 2009, ISBN 1-84467-342-1
- French: Métailié, 2009, ISBN 2-86424-688-0
- Spanish: Mondadori, 2009, ISBN 84-397-2185-4
- German: Assoziation A, 2018, ISBN 978-3-86241-465-9

== See also ==
- Wu Ming
- Q (novel)
- 54
- New Italian Epic
