= 54 (novel) =

2002 novel by Wu Ming

- Heinemann hardcover edition
- Author: Wu Ming
- Language: Italian
- Genre: Novel
- Published: 2002 (Einaudi)
- Publication place: Italy
- Media type: Print (Paperback)
- Pages: 673 pp
- ISBN: 88-06-16203-9
- OCLC: 248931329
- LC Class: PQ4923.U2 A15 2002

54 is a novel by Wu Ming first published in Italian in 2002.

Wu Ming is a collective of five authors founded in 2000. The members were formerly associated with the Luther Blissett Project, and four of them wrote the international best-selling novel Q.

The novel is set in Italy, former Yugoslavia, Britain and the US during the year 1954. It has been translated into several languages. All of the editions keep the original copyright statement, which allows for non-commercial reproduction of the book.

== Historical context and plots ==
The novel presents a vast multitude of characters and sub-plots.

It's 1954, Joseph Stalin is dead, Yugoslavia is the only socialist country to have broken relationships with the Soviet Union, and the Free Territory of Trieste is contended between Italy and her bordering neighbor country. In Italy, dissatisfaction is widespread among former members of the Resistance, as the Christian Democrat government has allowed many top figures of the Fascist regime to re-enter public and institutional life, and several former partisans are being persecuted as their guerrilla activities are taken out of their context and regarded as criminal actions. In Naples, mob boss Lucky Luciano is supervising the creation of the global heroin trade. In Italian Communist Party-controlled Bologna, a group of grumpy communists hang out at the Bar Aurora. The place is run by the young Capponi Brothers, whose father fought in Yugoslavia and decided to stay there after the war.

In the US, Joseph McCarthy's anti-communist witch hunt has reached its peak. In Hollywood, Cary Grant is utterly bored with his new life after retiring from his career as a movie star. Both Alfred Hitchcock and MI6 are trying to convince him to return to acting. While Hitchcock's proposal is precise and sharply focused – the master of suspense is preparing the filming of To Catch a Thief – MI6's is vague and implausible: Grant is supposed to travel to Yugoslavia and meet up with President Josip Broz Tito, to discuss the Marshal's willingness to co-operate with the western movie industry. MI6 reckon that a biopic on Tito's leading role in the Balkan Resistance would be a good weapon of psychological warfare on the USSR.

A key role in the parallel unfolding of these sub-plots is played by an American television set, a McGuffin Electric DeLuxe which is stolen from an Allied military base in Southern Italy, sold on the black market and then passed from one buyer to the next as no-one is able to make it work. "McGuffin" is a real, sentient character, the authors address him as a "he" and follow "his" stream of consciousness throughout the book, as he reasons about the rough way the Italians are treating him.

== Contemporary context and interpretations ==
Background research for the book began in 1999, after the publication of the group's previous novel Q. Plots were outlined in the aftermath of the Kosovo War. Actual writing work ended ten days after the 11 September attacks, on the eve of the war in Afghanistan. These two wars are explicitly referred to in the novel's End Titles: "Begun in May 1999, during the Nato bombings of Belgrade. Delivered to the Italian publishers on 21 September 2001, awaiting the escalation."

The events leading to (and following) 11 September are also allegorically described in the book's forenote:

"Post-war" means nothing.

What fools called "peace" simply meant moving away from the front.

Fools defended peace by supporting the armed wing of money.

Beyond the next dune the clashes continued. The fangs of chimerical beasts sinking into flesh, the heavens full of steel and smoke, whole cultures uprooted from the earth.

Fools fought the enemies of today by bankrolling those of tomorrow.

Fools swelled their chests, talked of "freedom", "democracy", "in our country", as they devoured the fruits of riots and looting.

They were defending civilisation against Chinese shadows of dinosaurs.

They were defending the planet against fake images of asteroids.

They were defending the Chinese shadow of a civilisation.

They were defending the fake image of a planet.

(translated by Shaun Whiteside)

The Observer wrote that 54 is a skilled book "about narcotics, the cheap potency of Hollywood, the coming of television, the balance of political power, and how the effects knock on down the line"

Red Pepper magazine noted that the book contains a "mockery of Berlusconi's media and political excesses"

According to The Independent, the novel tries to "explain how Europe's postwar quest for social justice was thwarted by rampant consumerism and a surrender to American power"

The novel has also been seen as an elegy for the shattered dreams of the Resistance movement, as well as a depiction of everyday life after the failure of a revolution.

In a 2008 speech given at Middlebury College, VT, Wu Ming 1 described the forenote to 54 as an "encrypted guide" to the poetics and allegories underlying many literary works produced in Italy in recent years, a heterogeneous narrative current which he called "New Italian Epic".

== Editions ==
The following are printed editions. Downloadable online editions in several languages can be found here.

- Dutch: Vassallucci, 2003, ISBN 90-5000-485-7
- English: Heinemann, 2005, ISBN 0-434-01293-9 – Harcourt, 2006, ISBN 0-15-101380-2 – Arrow, 2006, ISBN 0-09-947233-3
- Greek: Εξάρχεια, 2012, ISBN 978-618-80336-0-3
- Italian: Einaudi, 2002, ISBN 88-06-16203-9
- Portuguese (Brazilian): Conrad, 2005, ISBN 85-7616-028-5
- Spanish: Mondadori, 2003, ISBN 84-397-0985-4
- Serbian: Plato, 2010, ISBN 978-86-447-0523-9

== Trivia ==
The inclusion of Grant in the book was serendipitous and due to a mistake. As a member of the Wu Ming collective explained it in an interview: 'leafing through a 1954 magazine, [WM2] found an article on the film stars female readers loved the most. Gary Cooper topped the list. [He] jotted in a hurry "G.C." on his notebook. A few weeks later, going through his scrawls he read "C.G." instead of "G.C." and thought: Cary Grant. At our meeting he told us: "Cary Grant was the most popular actor among the female readers of such magazine. Inspiration! Cary Grant!'
