= Die Wand =

Die Wand may refer to:

- The Wall (novel), originally Die Wand, a novel by Austrian writer Marlen Haushofer
- The Wall (2012 film), originally Die Wand, an Austrian-German film based on the novel
