= Q (novel) =

Novel by Luther Blissett

- First edition (Italian)
- Author: Luther Blissett
- Translator: Shaun Whiteside
- Language: Italian
- Genre: Historical novel
- Publisher: Einaudi
- Publication date: 1999
- Publication place: Italy
- English publication date: 2003

Q is a novel by Luther Blissett first published in Italian in 1999. The novel is set in Europe during the 16th century, and deals with Protestant Reformation movements.

"Luther Blissett" was a nom de plume for four Italian authors (Roberto Bui, Giovanni Cattabriga, Federico Guglielmi and Luca Di Meo) who were part of the "Luther Blissett Project", which ended in 1999. They now write under the name Wu Ming.

The novel has been translated into Catalan, Danish, Dutch, English (British and American), French, German, Greek, Lithuanian, Korean, Polish, Russian, Turkish, Basque, Czech, Portuguese, Spanish, Serbian, and Chinese. All of the editions keep the original copyright statement, which allows the non-commercial reproduction of the book.

== Plot ==
The book follows the journey of an Anabaptist radical across Europe in the first half of the 16th century as he joins in various movements and uprisings that come as a result of the Protestant Reformation. The book spans 30 years as he is pursued by 'Q' (short for "Qoèlet"), a spy for the Roman Catholic Church cardinal Giovanni Pietro Carafa. The main character, who changes his name many times during the story, first fights in the German Peasants' War beside Thomas Müntzer, during which time he takes part in negotiations which are eventually formalised as the Twelve Articles. Following this, he battles in Münster's siege, during the Münster Rebellion, and some years later, in Venice.

== Interpretations and controversy ==
Throughout Europe, several critics have read Q from a political point of view, and maintain that the novel is an allegory of European society after the decline of the 1960s and 1970s protest movements. As in the 16th century, the Counter-Reformation repressed any alternative theological current or radical social movement, and the Peace of Augsburg sanctioned the partition of the continent among Catholic and Protestant powers, so the last twenty years of the 20th century were marked by a vengeful rebirth of conservative ideologies, and the International Monetary Fund-driven corporate globalization of the economy seemed to rout any resistance.

This interpretation stems from the authors describing Q as a "handbook of survival skills", which might cast a revealing light on the book's ending. But, this is just one of the many interpretations that have emerged following publication.

According to other readers and critics, Q is a thinly disguised autobiography of Luther Blissett as a subversive, identity-shifting collective phantom. The protagonist has no name (the authors later renamed themselves Wu Ming, which is Chinese for "no name"), is involved in every tumult of the age, incites the people to rebellion, and organizes hoaxes, swindles and mischievous acts.

Both British novelist Stewart Home and American novelist David Liss have interpreted Q as an "anti-novel", although their respective analyses come to different conclusions. While Home's review emphasized the social, political and subcultural references embedded in the plot, Liss' review dismissed the book as unnecessary and self-referential.

Other readers have suggested that Q — apart from radicalism, post-modernism, and allegories — is above all an adventure novel, a swashbuckler in the very Italian tradition of Emilio Salgari and other popular feuilleton authors.

In 2018, a reporter for BuzzFeed News suggested that the right-wing "QAnon" conspiracy theory shared many similarities to plot points in the novel.

== Film adaptation ==
Rumours about a potential film adaptation of Q have circulated since the mid-2000s. On December 9 2007, the British newspaper The Observer published a lengthy interview with Radiohead in which Thom Yorke stated:

"Oh it's fucking ace! But my missus, that's her specialist field, so she's been explaining it to me all the way through. Medieval church carnage. It's mental. I want to get it made into a film. That's my next mission." The interviewer asked: "Using the In Rainbows profits?", to which Yorke replied: "I doubt it. That would cover basically the catering."

On January 21, 2011, the Italian producer Domenico Procacci optioned Q to make a movie and commissioned the screenplay for the film to Giaime Alonge and Alessandro Scippa. Procacci's production company, Fandango, was planning a co-production with other countries.

== Altai: a "return to Q " ==
In May 2009 Wu Ming announced that they had almost finished writing a new book, set "in [their debut novel] Q's world and historical continuum". They announced it would be published in Italy in the Fall of 2009. Later on, they revealed that the title would be Altai and explained:

We felt the urge to go back to the “crime scene” (our 1999 debut) after the collective lost a member, in the springtime of 2008. After months of crisis and conflict, we needed a new beginning. We needed a peculiar self-managed group therapy... Gert-from-the-Well appeared and told us: “I can help you, if you bring me back to life!”. And that’s what we did.

== Historical characters and events ==
German Peasants' War

- Thomas Müntzer – Reformation pastor and Anabaptist;
- Martin Bucer – Protestant reformer;
- Wolfgang Fabricius Capito – German reformer;
- Martin Borrhaus (Cellarius) – Unitarianist reformer;
- 15 May 1525 - Battle of Frankenhausen
- Hans Hut Anabaptist bookseller

Münster Rebellion

- Jan van Leiden – Münster rebellion Anabaptist leader and King
- Jan Matthys – anabaptist leader and alleged prophet
- Melchior Hoffman – Anabaptist prophet
- Bernhard Rothmann – Anabaptist theologian
- Franz von Waldeck – prince-bishop of Münster and army chief in the siege of the city
- Bernhard Knipperdolling – guild leader in Münster city council and Anabaptist leader
- Bernhard Krechting – guild leader in Münster city council and Anabaptist leader
- Heinrich Krechting
- Heinrich Gresbeck
- John Trypmaker

Antwerp

- Jan van Batenburg – revolutionary Anabaptist;
- Anton Fugger – banker
- Eloi Pruystinck – Reformation leader

Venice

- João Miquez – merchant
- Spirituali
- Giovanni Pietro Carafa – cardinal, later Pope Paul IV
- Reginald Pole – cardinal

== Editions ==
- Basque: Gatazka Kolektiboa, 2009, ISBN 978-84-613-5252-4
- Catalan: Virus, 2026, ISBN 978-84-17870-00-3
- Czech: Dokořán, 2006, ISBN 80-7363-072-9
- Danish: Hovedland, 2002, ISBN 87-7739-554-9
- Dutch: Wereldbibliotheek, 2001, ISBN 90-284-1877-6
- English: Heinemann, 2003, ISBN 0-434-01000-6 Harcourt, 2004, ISBN 0-15-101063-3 Arrow, 2004, ISBN 0-09-943983-2
- French: Seuil, 2001, ISBN 2-02-040066-9, with the title L'œil de Carafa
- German: Piper, 2002, ISBN 3-492-04218-X
- Greek: Travlos, 2001, ISBN 960-7990-35-8
- Greek: Oi Ekdoseis ton Synadelfon, 2022, ISBN 618-5571-16-1
- Italian: Einaudi, 1999, ISBN 88-06-15572-5
- Japanese: Tokyosogensha, 2014, ISBN 978-4488010119
- Korean: Saemulgyeol, 2006, ISBN 978-89-555-9212-2
- Polish: Albatros, 2005, ISBN 83-7359-269-5
- Portuguese (Brazilian): Conrad, 2002, ISBN 85-87193-56-2
- Russian: Machaon, 2006, ISBN 5-18-001036-5
- Serbian: Plato, 2010, ISBN 978-86-447-0524-6
- Spanish: Grijalbo/Mondadori, 2000, ISBN 84-9759-358-8
- Turkish: Everest Yayinlari, 2015, ISBN 97-5289-645-6

== See also ==
- Wu Ming
- 54
- Manituana
- New Italian Epic
