= The Loft =

The Loft may refer to:

== Arts, entertainment, and media ==
- The Loft (British band), a British indie band
- The Loft (Danish band), a Danish band
- The Loft (film) (2014) an American film
- The Loft Literary Center, a nonprofit literary organization in Minneapolis, Minnesota
- The Loft (novel) (1969), a novel by Marlen Haushofer

== Buildings and venues ==
- The Loft (New York City), a nightclub in New York City
- The Loft, the upstairs concert hall of The Chance concert and theater complex, Poughkeepsie, New York
- The Loft 2, residential skyscrapers in Miami

== See also ==
- Loft (disambiguation)
