= The Wall (Haushofer novel) =

1963 novel by Marlen Haushofer

- Author: Marlen Haushofer
- Original title: Die Wand
- Translator: Shaun Whiteside
- Language: German
- Publisher: Sigbert Mohn Verlag
- Publication date: 1963
- Publication place: West Germany
- English publication date: 1990
- Pages: 264

The Wall (German: Die Wand) is a 1963 novel by Austrian writer Marlen Haushofer. Considered the author's finest work, The Wall is an example of dystopian fiction. The English translation by Shaun Whiteside was published by Cleis Press in 1990.

The novel's main character is a 40-something woman whose name the reader never learns. While she is vacationing in a hunting lodge in the Austrian mountains, a transparent wall has been placed that closes her off from the outside world; all life outside the wall appears to have died. With a dog, a cow, and a cat as her sole companions, she struggles to survive and to come to terms with the situation. Facing fear and loneliness, she writes an account of her isolation without knowing whether or not anyone will ever read it.

== Composition ==
The novel was composed four times over in longhand between 1960 and 1963. In a letter written to a friend in 1961, Marlen describes the difficulty with its composition:

I am writing on my novel and everything is very cumbersome because I never have much time and, mainly, because I can not embarrass myself. I must continuously inquire whether what I say about animals and plants is actually correct. One can not be precise enough. I would be very happy, indeed, if I were able to write the novel only half as well as I am imagining it in my mind.

She commented a year later to the same friend:

I am extremely industrious. My novel is completed in its first draft. I have already completed one hundred pages of the rewrite. Altogether there will be 360 pages. Writing strains me a great deal and I suffer from headaches. But I hope that I will be finished by the beginning of May (I must allow at least four weeks for the typing)...And the household must keep on running also. All that is very difficult for me because I can only concentrate on one thing and forcing me to be versatile makes me extremely nervous. I have the feeling as if I were writing into the air.

== Plot ==
Accompanied by her cousin and her cousin's husband, the 40-year-old narrator travels to the Austrian mountains. They plan to stay in a hunting lodge for the weekend, but the next morning the woman finds herself alone with her cousin's dog, Luchs. The couple, who planned on having dinner in the valley, did not return. The woman leaves to look for the couple but soon discovers why they did not come back: a seemingly endless, invisible wall separates her from the other side of the valley.

In an attempt to find out what had happened, she uses binoculars to look for other people. The only other person she can see is a man who seems to be frozen still. It seems to her that a tragedy killed all living creatures on the other side of the wall. She is entirely alone, protected and trapped, in equal measure, by the invisible wall.

All her attempts to get to the other side of the wall fail, so she slowly starts to adjust to her new situation. Because the area in which she is trapped is fairly wide, she learns to live off her supplies, the fruits and animals of the surrounding forest, and her garden. Besides looking after herself she soon starts to look after the animals who are dependent on her: a dog, cats, and a pregnant cow. With the winter coming she starts writing a report that makes up the book, unsure whether anyone will ever read it.

Towards the end of the novel, the first and only other person appears. He kills her dog and calf, apparently with no reason for doing so. She shoots him, ending perhaps her only chance of ever interacting with a human again.

The story ends with her writing that the cow is pregnant again, and she is hoping that the cat will have new kittens. But she is also running out of ammunition and matches, so her future might become even more difficult. At the end of the book, her fate is unknown.

== Critical response ==
There are many different ways to interpret Haushofer's novel. In one, the book can be understood as fairly radical criticism of modern civilization: the protagonist is forced to return to a more natural way of life, showing how useless cultural goods become in situations such as the one described in the novel and how life in the city makes people "unfit for living in harmony with nature." For example, the Mercedes-Benz automobile in which she arrived slowly becomes overgrown by plants, and the "wall" seems to protect her, giving her the opportunity to change and rethink her priorities. The novel is also described as a twentieth century Entwicklungsroman, which explores the "psychological, rather than social-historic, aspects of the heroine's maturation process."

Nobel Prize winner Doris Lessing writes:

The Wall is a wonderful novel. It is not often that you can say only a woman could have written this book, but women in particular will understand the heroine's loving devotion to the details of making a keeping life, every day felt as a victory against everything that would like to undermine and destroy. It is as absorbing as Robinson Crusoe.

In her autobiographical novel for children, Himmel, der nirgendwo endet, written in 1966, Haushofer describes the increasing distance between a daughter and her mother as a "wall" between them that cannot be broken through easily; from this perspective, The Wall could be considered a metaphor for the loneliness of human beings.

Academic Lisa Cornick notes that the novel is an example of "premise fiction," wherein Haushofer introduces a "single extraordinary premise by revising the realism of the imaginary wall, but does let everything else in the story conform to what one might expect in the real world."

Critics have stated that The Wall is the ultimate example of Haushofer's main theme: "the accepted reality of mankind, which people can't find, aren't allowed to find, and don't want to find." Dagmar Lorenz, in a 1998 article on the relationship between humans and animals, refers to the novel as "anti-speciesist", says the narrator "becomes the matriarch of animal survivors, and kills the last surviving human male."

Critic Maria-Regina Kecht considers Haushofer, along with Ingeborg Bachmann, to be a forerunner for a generation of German-language women writers including Elfriede Jelinek, Barbara Frischmuth, and others. Kecht points out that Haushofer and Bachmann published their important works before the international women's movement caught on in Austria, and that the two of them portrayed the fate of women in a male-dominated society, and criticized a system that favored the rights of the strong over the weak.

== Influence ==
The novel influenced author Elfriede Jelinek, who dedicated one of her Princess Plays to Haushofer, citing The Wall specifically. Jelinek expressed her approval of Die Wand's finally being recognized in an interview in 2000.

In one of the pieces in Claire-Louise Bennett's Pond, the narrator describes her reading of The Wall. Bennett herself has described in an interview being drawn to Haushofer, among other writers, and she later wrote an afterword to the New Directions edition of The Wall that was published in 2022.

== Adaptations ==
The novel was adapted into the 2012 film The Wall, directed by Julian Pölsler and starring Martina Gedeck.
