= Wolfgang Maria Bauer =

German television actor, theatre director and author

- Born: Wolfgang Maria Bauer; 9 June 1963 (age 62); Munich, Germany

Wolfgang Maria Bauer (born 9 June 1963) is a German television actor, theatre director and author.

== Selected filmography ==
- Father's Day (1996)
- Cologne's Finest (1997)
- 666 – Traue keinem, mit dem du schläfst! (666: In Bed with the Devil, 2002)
- Siska (TV-Series) (from 2004-2008)
- Die Wand (2012)
- Welcome to Germany (2016)

== Selected writing (German) ==
- Der Schatten eines Fluges - Die Geschichte von Mathias Kneißl
- Der Zikadenzüchter
- In den Augen eines Fremden
- Julie, Traum und Rausch (nach Motiven August Strindbergs ...)
- Kirsche in Not!
- Nanou
- Späte Wut
- Wir hätten gewinnen müssen
