= Nicola Pugliese =

Italian author and journalist

- Born: Nicola Pugliese; August 08, 1944; Milan, Italy
- Died: April 25, 2012 (aged 67); Avella, Italy
- Notable work: Malacqua

Nicola Pugliese (8 August 1944, Milan – 25 April 2012, Avella) was an Italian author and journalist.

He published his debut novel, Malacqua, in 1977. Despite selling out in days, he requested not be reprinted and retired to a private life in Avella. It wasn’t printed again until after his death in 2012.

An English translation of Malacqua (trans. Shaun Whiteside) was published by And Other Stories in 2017.
