= Siska (TV series) =

German television series

- Genre: Police drama
- Created by: Herbert Reinecker; Helmut Ringelmann
- Starring: Peter Kremer; Wolfgang Maria Bauer
- Music by: Eberhard Schoener
- Country of origin: Germany
- Original language: German
- No. of episodes: 91

Production
- Running time: 60 minutes

Original release
- Network: ZDF
- Release: October 30, 1998 – July 4, 2008

Siska is a German television series created by Herbert Reinecker and Helmut Ringelmann and broadcast since October 30, 1998 on the network ZDF. In France, the series was broadcast on France 3 and rebroadcast on 13th Street. It is a police drama and follows the adventures of Peter Siska, a police officer of Munich, and later Victor Siska.

== Cast ==
- Peter Kremer: Police Officer Peter Siska (Episodes 1–56, 1998–2004)
- Matthias Freihof: Police Officer Lorenz Wiegand (Episodes 1–50, 1998–2003)
- Robinson Reichel: Police Officer Felix Bender (Episodes 51–56, 2003)
- Tobias Nath: Police Officer Gerhard Lessmann (Episodes 57–77, 2005–2007)
- Wolfgang Maria Bauer: Police Officer Viktor Siska (Episodes 57–91, 2004–2008)
- Werner Schnitzer: Police Officer Jacob Hahne (since 1998–2008)
- Dirk Plönissen: Police Officer Robert Dahlberg (since 2007–2008)
