= Killing Stella =

Novella by Marlen Haushofer

- A 1990 edition of novellas and short stories by Haushofer
- Author: Marlen Haushofer
- Original title: Wir töten Stella
- Language: German
- Genre: Novella
- Published: 1958 Bergland Verlag, Vienna
- Publication place: Austria
- Media type: Print
- Pages: 52

Wir töten Stella (lit. "Killing Stella") is a novella by Austrian writer Marlen Haushofer first published in 1958 about the death of the eponymous heroine, a 19-year-old woman who has just begun to experience her awakening sexuality. Narrated by Anna, a 40-year-old mother of two in whose house Stella has spent her final months, Wir töten Stella provides an insight into the bourgeois society of post-war Austria and paints a picture of a deteriorating family whose overall ambition is to keep up appearances.

== Plot introduction ==
Set in the late 1950s, the novella takes the form of a written confession committed to paper in the course of a weekend shortly after Stella's death during which the narrator is alone at home, as her husband Richard and their two children have left the city to visit Richard's mother. Anna realizes that on the surface level everything is back to normal again now that Stella is no longer around: an intruder imposed on the family who was threatening to upset the equilibrium carefully, and tacitly, maintained by each family member has left again. However, Anna cannot but delve deeper into the matter: guilt-ridden, and unable to find any peace of mind, let alone happiness, she remembers many details of Stella's stay in the house, and starts relating the events that have led to the catastrophe of her death in chronological order.

== Plot summary ==
When Luise, Stella's mother, asks her old friend Anna if her family could put up her daughter for the duration of one schoolyear so that she can attend commercial school in the city, they unwillingly agree. Though a natural beauty, Stella is an unrefined country girl who wears neither make-up nor perfume and who dresses in nondescript clothes. Her diffident politeness does not endear her to her hosts and makes it easy for them not to integrate her into the family. Stella does not keep in touch with her mother either, who has gone to Italy on a months-long holiday spree with her lover.

Anna has known for many years that her husband is a womanizer but has always felt unable to confront him or do anything about his love affairs. A successful lawyer whose office is in the city centre, and a respectable pillar of society, Richard seemingly takes every chance that offers itself to betray his wife. Careless about leaving traces, he often comes home late at night, allegedly after a long day at the office, when his wife is already in bed pretending to be asleep, and time and again she can smell other women's perfume or detect smears of lipstick on his shirt. Annette, their daughter, who is of primary school age, is the only one in the family who does not sense what is going on whereas 15-year-old Wolfgang, their son, does but understands the importance of not bringing up that taboo topic: if he did, he would be one of the likely targets of his father's revenge.

It is Anna herself who triggers the subsequent events when she encourages Stella to wear trendier clothes and generally helps her metamorphose into a young lady. Only now seeing her beauty, Richard starts an affair with the sexually inexperienced young woman and, when she gets pregnant, procures an abortion for her performed by one of his old friends who is a gynaecologist. Mistaking sexual satisfaction for love, Stella keeps pursuing her lover long after she has been dropped by him, a situation complicated by the fact that, at least for the time being, both are living under the same roof. Eventually Stella realizes that Richard has embarked on yet another affair, and throws herself in front of a lorry. Her motives for committing suicide are never openly discussed; rather, the family say they suspect it must have been an accident.

== Rediscovery ==
Starting in the 1970s and 1980s, many critics began to look at Haushofer's work through a feminist lens. Since then, Wir töten Stella has been continuously in print in its German original. An English translation by Shaun Whiteside was published by New Directions in 2025.

== Stage adaptation ==
A dramatized version of Wir töten Stella in the form of a monologue spoken by Anna was written and performed in Dutch by Natali Broods. Entitled Het was zonder twijfel een ongeluk (It Was Without Doubt an Accident), the play premiered in Antwerp, Belgium on September 27, 2007.
