= Helga Schneider =

Italian writer of German origin (born 1937)

Helga Schneider (born in Steinberg (now Jastrzębnik in Poland), 17 November 1937) is an Italian writer of German origin. She was the recipient of the Rapallo Carige Prize 1996 for II rogo di Berlino.

The 2017 biopic Let me go, directed by Scottish director and screenwriter Polly Steele, premiered at the Edinburgh International Film Festival.

== Books by Helga Schneider ==
- Il rogo di Berlino (1995), translated from the Italian by Shaun Whiteside as: The Bonfire of Berlin: A Lost Childhood in Wartime Germany (2005)
- Lasciami andare, madre (2001), translated from the Italian by Shaun Whiteside as: Let Me Go (2001)
