= Lilian Faschinger =

Austrian writer (born 1950)

- Born: 1950 (age 75–76); Tschöran, Carinthia, Austria
- Occupations: Writer and translator

Lilian Faschinger (born 29 April 1950) is an Austrian novelist, short story writer, poet, and literary translator.

== Life ==
Faschinger studied literature, history, and English at the University of Graz, earning a doctorate in English literature.

Faschinger's first novel Die neue Scheherazade (The New Scheherazade) attracted considerable critical recognition when it appeared in 1986. Her second novel, Lustspiel, appeared in 1989, followed by two collections of short stories (Frau mit drei Flugzeugen (Woman with Three Airplanes) in 1993 and Sprünge in 1994). Her most recent novels are Magdalena Sünderin (Magdalena the Sinner, 1995) and Wiener Passion (Viennese Passion, 1999). She won international recognition with her novel Magdalena Sünderin (1995), which was translated into 17 languages. Her fiction includes a feminist critique of Austrian society and customs. Faschinger asserts the importance of writing as a means of empowering women.

In addition to fiction, Faschinger has written and published poetry.

Faschinger lives in Vienna.

== Literary Publications ==
- Selbstauslöser: Lyrik und Prosa (poetry and short prose, 1983)
- Die neue Scheherazade: Roman (novel, 1986)
- Lustspiel: Ein Roman (novel, 1989)
- Frau mit drei Flugzuegen (short stories, 1993) (Woman with Three Aeroplanes, translated by Shaun Whiteside, 1998)
- Sprünge (short stories, 1994)
- Ortsfremd: Gedichte (poetry, 1994)
- Magdalena Sünderin (novel, 1995) (Magdalena the Sinner, translated by Shaun Whiteside)
- Wiener Passion: Roman (novel, 1999) (Vienna Passion, translated by Anthea Bell, 2000)
- Paarweise, acht Pariser Episoden (short story cycle, 2002)
- Stadt der Verlierer: Roman (novel, 2007)
- Die Unzertrennlichen: Roman (novel, 2012)

Her translations into German include works by Paul Bowles, Janet Frame, Elizabeth Smart, and Gertrude Stein.

== Literary Prizes and Awards ==
- Österreichisches Staatsstipedium für Literatur (1986/87)
- Österreichischer Staatspreis für literarische Übersetzer (1990 with Thomas Priebisch)
- Romstipendium des Bundesministeriums für Unterricht und Kunst (1991)
- Literaturpreis des Landes Steiermark (1998)
- Friedrich Glauser Preis (2008)
- Kulturpreis des Landes Kärnten (2010)

== See also ==
- List of Austrian writers
