= Atomised (film) =

2006 film

- Movie poster
- Directed by: Oskar Roehler
- Written by: Michel Houellebecq; Oskar Roehler
- Produced by: Oliver Berben; Bernd Eichinger
- Starring: Moritz Bleibtreu; Christian Ulmen; Martina Gedeck; Franka Potente; Nina Hoss
- Music by: Martin Todsharow
- Production company: Constantin Film
- Distributed by: Constantin Film
- Release date: 12 February 2006
- Running time: 114 minutes
- Country: Germany
- Language: German

Atomised (German: Elementarteilchen; also known as The Elementary Particles) is a 2006 German drama film written and directed by Oskar Roehler and produced by Oliver Berben and Bernd Eichinger. It is based on the novel Les Particules élémentaires by Michel Houellebecq. The film stars Moritz Bleibtreu as Bruno, Christian Ulmen as Michael, Martina Gedeck as Christiane, Franka Potente as Annabelle, and Nina Hoss as Jane.

The film had its premiere at the Berlin Film Festival in Germany in February 2006. In contrast to the book setting in Paris, the film was shot entirely and is mainly situated in various places in Germany. Cities and states in Germany used for filming included Thuringia and Berlin. Contrary to the book, the film does not have cultural pessimism as a main theme, and it has an alternative ending.

== Plot ==
The film focuses on Michael (Michael Djerzinski) and Bruno and their disturbed sexuality. They are half-brothers who are very different from each other. They both had an unusual childhood because their mother was a hippie, instead growing up with their grandmothers and in boarding schools.

Michael grows up to become a molecular biologist and in doing so becomes more fascinated with genetics and separating reproduction and sexuality by cloning rather than having actual sexual relationships. He is frustrated by his current job in Berlin and decides to continue his research on cloning at an institution in Ireland. Bruno, a secondary school teacher and unsuccessful author, on the other hand, is obsessed with his own sexual desires and systematically drowns himself in failed attempts with women and nights with prostitutes. He voluntarily checks himself into a mental institution after having sexually harassed one of his students.

Before his departure to Ireland, Michael visits the village of his childhood for the first time in years. To his surprise, he meets his childhood friend Annabelle there and finds that she is still single and they start a sexual relationship. Bruno leaves the mental institution and goes on holiday to a hippie camp after being faced with divorce by his wife. At the camp he meets Christiane, who is also sexually open. Although they have an open relationship, he falls in love with her.

During a sex orgy at one of their visits to a swing club, Christiane collapses and Bruno is confronted in hospital with the news that Christiane is paralysed forever because of a chronic illness. Nonetheless Bruno wants to live with her until the end. However Christiane insists that he should take some time for consideration. Michael moves to Ireland and learns that, despite his doubts, his old research on cloning was a revolutionary breakthrough. However he misses Annabelle but does not manage to get her on the phone. Annabelle is informed that she is pregnant but must have an abortion and her womb removed due to life-threatening abnormalities. Bruno calls Christiane but always replaces the receiver after just one ring. He finally drives to her apartment only to learn that she has committed suicide shortly before. Subsequently he re-enters the mental institution totally devastated. Michael is told by Annabelle's mother that Annabelle had an abortion and a severe surgery. He immediately leaves Ireland for Annabelle and finally openly admits his deep love to her.

In hospital Bruno has hallucinations of Christiane who explains to him that her suicide was not his fault. In his imagination he tells her that he ultimately has decided to stay with her forever. After Annabelle recovers and before their departure to Ireland, Michael and Annabelle visit Bruno in hospital and take him to the beach. Michael asks Bruno if he wants to come with Annabelle and him to Ireland but Bruno decides to live happily in hospital with Christiane in his mind forever.

The film ends with title cards stating that Michael Djerzinski received the Nobel Prize. This too is fiction.

== Cast ==
- Moritz Bleibtreu
- Christian Ulmen
- Martina Gedeck
- Franka Potente
- Nina Hoss

== Reception ==
The film has a 100 percent rating in the review aggregating website Rotten Tomatoes based on six reviews.
