= Antonio Trashorras =

Spanish screenwriter

- Born: September 22, 1969 (age 55); Spain
- Occupation: Screenwriter

Antonio Trashorras (born 22 September 1969), is a Spanish screenwriter.

He collaborated on the screenplay of The Devil's Backbone, and Agnosía. He has worked in Spanish television.
