= Agnosia (film) =

- Promotional film poster
- Directed by: Eugenio Mira
- Written by: Antonio Trashorras
- Produced by: Isaac Torras
- Starring: Eduardo Noriega; Martina Gedeck; Jack Taylor
- Cinematography: Unax Mendía
- Edited by: Jose Luis Romeu
- Music by: Eugenio Mira
- Production companies: Roxbury Pictures; Telecinco Cinema
- Distributed by: Filmax
- Release date: 21 February 2010
- Country: Spain
- Language: Spanish

Agnosia is a 2010 Spanish baroque retro-futuristic thriller directed by Eugenio Mira and written by Antonio Trashorras.

== Plot ==
A young woman, Joana Prats, has agnosia, a strange, primary visual disease that is one of the neuropsychological disorders of perception. Although her eyes and ears are in perfect condition, her brain is not able to correctly interpret the stimuli it receives. Joana is the only person to know an industrial secret left behind by her late father and becomes the victim of a sinister plan to extract this information. Her captors plan to use her sensory condition to help extract the information that they so desperately want.

== Cast ==
Cast	role
Eduardo Noriega	as Carles
Félix Gómez	as Vicent
Bárbara Goenaga	as Joana Prats
Martina Gedeck	as Prevert
Luis Zahera	as Mariano
Jack Taylor	as Meissner
Sergi Mate	as Artur Prats
Miranda Makaroff	as Nuria

== Production ==
Roxbury Pictures shot the film in December 2009 at Barcelona and Parc Nacional d'Aigüestortes Estany de Sant Maurici in Province of Lleida. It was the second film directed by producer Eugenio Mira and based on a screenplay by Antonio Trashorras. In the leads in the thriller acts Eduardo Noriega, Martina Gedeck, Bárbara Goenaga and Jack Taylor in his second feature film under Eugenio Mira.

== Release ==
The film was released in February 2010 on the European Film Market. The theatrical release is anticipated in October 2010.
