= The Loft (novel) =

1969 novel by Marlen Haushofer

- The Loft, English Edition Cover
- Author: Marlen Haushofer
- Original title: Die Mansarde
- Language: German
- Genres: novel
- Set in: Austria
- Publisher: Claassen
- Publication date: 1969

The Loft (Die Mansarde) is a novel by Austrian writer Marlen Haushofer, published in 1969. In 2011, the novel was translated into English by Amanda Prantera and published by Serbian Classics Press. At the time of writing, Haushofer was already seriously ill. With her final novel, she delivers a socio-psychological study of a housewife's existence and middle-class married life in Austria's first post-war generation. The narrator's temporary deafness and her regular retreat to the attic symbolize the need for escape from reality. Recurring motifs in Haushofer's work that are also found in this novel include loneliness in marriage and the inadequacy of communication between the sexes.

== Content ==
The novel depicts a mostly ordinary winter week from the perspective of a housewife and mother of two children. Her marriage to a lawyer has long since frozen into routine; she has given up her profession as a graphic artist and now draws only as a hobby, preferably insects, fish, reptiles, and birds. The place of this creative activity is the titular attic of the family home, to which the narrator retreats every evening. One day, an anonymous sender mails her own diary entries from a traumatic period of her life.

After suddenly becoming deaf due to the sound of a fire siren, the narrator was sent by her husband and his mother to the former hunting lodge of her deceased father-in-law to recover. Her only social contacts during this time are the hunter entrusted with her care, whom she distrusts from the beginning, and a stranger she encounters during a walk. The stranger considers her an ideal listener for his – judging by his emotional agitation while telling – apparently dark secrets due to her deafness and asks for further meetings to confide in her. At their last meeting, he proposes in writing that she leave with him. When the narrator rejects the proposal, he crushes a glass in a fit of rage. The shock restores the narrator's hearing ability.

Back with her family, the narrator does not want to think about this experience anymore. She therefore perceives the anonymous letters as threatening and burns them after reading. When the last letter is burned, she achieves a creative breakthrough: after countless failed attempts to draw a bird that looks as if it were not the only bird in the world, she draws a dragon whose uniqueness she no longer perceives as a flaw.

== Form ==
The novel is narrated from a first-person point of view, divided into eight chapters, each dealing with the description of a weekday from one Sunday to the next. Chapters on Sundays consist of one part, chapters on weekdays consist of three parts: the narrator's report on her daily routine, the print of the mailed diary entries, and the narrator's report on burning the entries.

The quantitatively largest part of the novel is devoted to describing the narrator's weekly routine; the focus on everyday tasks is meant to suppress unwelcome memories. The nightly burning of the letters serves the same purpose – the narrator wants to resist remembering with all her might. Through the narrative device of anonymous postal deliveries, Haushofer succeeds in confronting the narrator with the repressed period and thus simultaneously addressing both the process of remembering and the resistance to remembering.

== Themes and Motifs ==
=== Family and Pseudo-Family ===
The narrator grows up as the only and unplanned child of parents suffering from tuberculosis. For hygienic precautions, the parents avoid any physical contact. The narrator perceives this as rejection; she feels excluded from the intimate loving relationship of her parents.

In her mid-twenties, the narrator married the aspiring lawyer Hubert; together they have two children: son Ferdinand and daughter Ilse. But even in this family, the narrator does not find security – the love for her husband has long since been extinguished, communication is limited to the exchange of platitudes, sex has become routine and does nothing to bring the spouses closer to each other. The disturbed parent-child relationship is also reproduced by the narrator. She cannot relate to her vital, self-confident daughter Ilse; Ilse's birth already falls in the period when the narrator perceives her family only as a pseudo-family. By then she had already recovered from her illness, but she cannot get over the banishment into exile by her husband and mother-in-law. After her return, she seemingly resumes the role of wife and mother, but does so in the awareness that she is merely maintaining a facade.

At the birth of her son – before illness and exile – an authentic family life still seemed possible; the relationship with Ferdinand is therefore more intimate, but also burdened by the unprocessed core trauma of separation (from her parents in childhood; from husband and child during her own illness). The son serves as a substitute object with multiple functions for the mother, both as a male offspring and as an appreciative parental instance (when he praises her pastries, for example). Through this substitution, the narrator tries to disguise her inability to form relationships. She is aware of the ethical questionability of this strategy; however, this awareness only leads to feelings of guilt and mental self-censorship.

=== Illness and Exclusion ===
A central theme of the novel is the estrangement between family members. This isolation within the family and the resulting feeling of helplessness is expressed through the narrator's temporary deafness. Added to this is the wife's feeling of living in her husband's house and not in her own home.

The motif of family isolation can already be found in the narrator's family of origin. All the mother's love and care is concentrated on the tuberculosis-stricken husband – the love even goes so far that the mother eventually infects herself. The healthy child, however, is to be protected from infection, is therefore kept at a distance and feels excluded by the sick parents. This pattern is later repeated with reversed signs through the psychosomatic illness of the narrator. Now it is the sick person who is kept away from the healthy ones, although her illness, unlike her parents' tuberculosis, is not contagious at all. While her father received special attention from her mother due to his illness, the narrator feels abandoned by her family in her suffering. The exile in the forest solitude is presented by her husband and mother-in-law as a therapeutic measure, but in reality the environment seems hardly conducive to recovery – the narrator receives no medical care there; her only contact person is a hunter with little empathy who provides her with groceries and otherwise treats her rather hostilely. The narrator perceives him as a guard, the time in the hunting lodge as a prison sentence. As in her childhood, she again refrains from complaining, complies with the plans of her relatives, and does not criticize their behavior even after her recovery. The pattern of avoiding arguments and conflicts continues.

=== Pseudo-Death and Pseudo-Life ===
The narrator divides her life story into phases of real life and periods of purely biological existence. Of forty-seven years of life, she perceives in retrospect only twelve as real life – seven happy years with her grandfather after her parents' death, five happy years with Hubert before her illness. She sees the relocation to the hunting lodge as a metaphorical death, but the sudden recovery only as a pseudo-resurrection, which does not awaken her to new life, but only to a dull form of pseudo-vitality.

This pseudo-vitality manifests itself in a marriage that consists only of a sequence of long-practiced scenes, and also characterizes all other social contacts of the narrator, which she maintains without much inner participation merely to fulfill the duties of her roles as housewife and mother. All social contacts accordingly fall into the ideal of the female gender role – the narrator regularly visits her former landlady, thus demonstrating respect for the elderly, and continues to maintain contact with another mother who was with her in the maternity ward. By maintaining these pseudo-contacts, she disguises her actual isolation. Her interpersonal interactions are never about emotional connection or interest in the other person – the purpose of the exercise, besides maintaining the bourgeois facade, is mainly distraction from her own obsessive thoughts.

=== Repression of the Past ===
In addition to the role of the housewife in the 1960s, The Loft also deals with war and post-war themes and the issue of coming to terms with the past. The novel can be interpreted as a staging of collective amnesia and cultural memory.

Each weekday chapter ends with the burning of the diary entries sent that day. The time in the forest solitude described therein represents a traumatic episode in the narrator's life – however, she is not ready to process this trauma. The repression of private trauma is reflected at the collective level in the confrontation with World War II. Uncertainty and being overwhelmed lead the narrator to see repression as the only option. Instead of working through the past and thus overcoming it, she uses all her energy to restore the status quo. The elevation of silence and repression to a maxim of behavior prevents any hope of behavioral change.

=== The Loft as a Retreat ===
The titular loft serves simultaneously as a space of creativity and a space of exclusion. This is where the narrator voluntarily retreats to develop her individuality away from the housewife role and to engage in activities that could disrupt the regulated flow of family life. In the background, besides a desire not to disturb and not to be disturbed, there is probably also the unspoken fear of being pushed back into the forest solitude if she were to deviate from her role again. The symbol of the loft thus refers both to the bourgeois-idyllic tradition of the artist's room close to heaven and to the tradition of the madwoman in the attic (a well-known example is found in "Jane Eyre"), where any form of femininity perceived as threatening is radically locked away. The highly limited escape movement of the narrator does not lead to freedom, but only to the loft, which represents a substitute place for actual free space and thus supports rather than breaks the conventional bourgeois and family order.

The search for a retreat is found in almost all of Haushofer's books. These retreats stand on the one hand for the necessary freedom to survive, but on the other hand serve to lock away the life taking place there without endangering the traditional order. In the loft, creativity is domesticated. The protagonist's compulsive focus on the monotonous tasks of daily housework becomes an exorcism ritual.

=== Redemption Through Art ===
Just as the interpretation of the loft is ambivalent, so is the final result of the creative activity taking place there. The protagonist's drawings reflect the self-metamorphoses triggered by the anonymous letters. Thus, after burning the last diary entries, the bird motif is replaced by a dragon. This new vision, however, does not arise in the loft, but in the cellar, symbolizing the risky descent into the sphere of the subconscious.

The burning of the diaries shows the protagonist's unwillingness to identify with the past; this process can be understood not only as purely destructive but also as dynamic. From the ashes of the diaries, the new vision of the dragon finally rises. The cyclical alternation of destruction and reconstitution illustrates the interplay of artistic productivity and self-development.

The dragon symbol unites the central motifs of the novel. As a mythical mixed creature uniting disparate elements, the dragon can be read as a metaphor for overcoming gender differences and breaking out of a conventional order. The dragon vision results from a lifting of the barriers between conscious and subconscious – artistic fantasy is no longer censored by a rigid sense of reality.

== Reception ==
For Daniela Strigl, The Loft is "a malicious, witty, sovereignly laconic marriage novel" that contains the sum of Haushofer's oppressive art. Critics also praise the careful composition of the novel, in which the different levels of time and consciousness are intertwined through mirroring relationships and parallelism and are topographically differentiated.

Compared to Haushofer's earlier novel Die Tapetentür (The Wallpaper Door), Die Loft represents for many critics a more successful analysis of gender relations, as it is more differentiated and complex. The accusation often made against Haushofer of gender-stereotypical typecasting does not apply here – figures such as the murderous baroness, the narrator's former landlady, demonstrate a deviation from the principle of gender dichotomization. Even the protagonist's over-fulfillment of femininity clichés can be interpreted as a deliberately employed masquerade that allows the protagonist to create room for her non-bourgeois attic activities.

The narrator's perspective, which many contemporary reviewers found unusual, also met with negative reactions. Critics particularly criticized the extravagance and abnormality of Haushofer's psychological portrayals and the pessimistic-fatalistic basic attitude expressed in the work. In a review by the Federal Association of Teachers at Vocational Schools in Austria, the novel was deemed unsuitable for young people. "The young person strives towards light and forward, does not want to be alone and does not hole up in the attic..."

The accusation of a lack of positive messages and utopian moments is only partially shared by feminist reception. Approaches to utopian thinking and development potential of the female main character are indeed recognizable – the dragon drawing in the last chapter can thus be interpreted as the happy result of an ongoing process of self-discovery by the narrator. The dragon as a self-portrait of the creative subject enables the design of a creature that is biologically and socially genderless. However, this conciliatory interpretation of the novel in terms of a survival pathos of female art production is seen as contradictory to the rest of Haushofer's work.
