= Martina Gedeck =

German actress

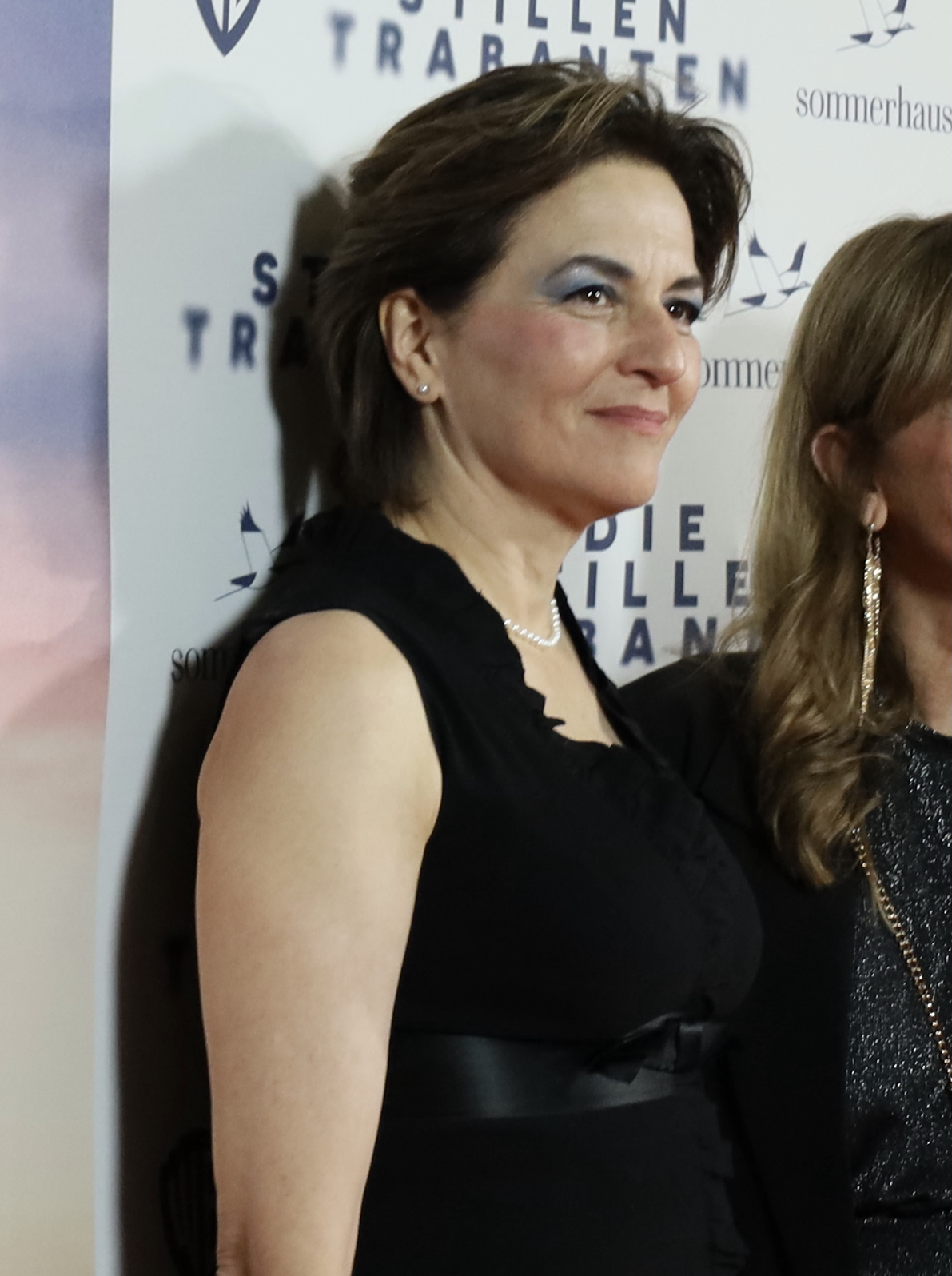
- Martina Gedeck at the premiere of Die stillen Trabanten, Leipzig, 2022
- Born: 14 September 1961 (age 64); Munich, Bavaria, West Germany
- Occupation: Actress
- Years active: 1981–present
- Spouse: Markus Imboden (m. 2005)
- Awards: German Film Award (1997, 2002)
- Website: martina-gedeck.com

Martina Gedeck (German: [maʁ.ˈtiː.na ˈɡeː.dɛk]; born 14 September 1961) is a German actress. She achieved international recognition due to her roles in films such as Mostly Martha (2001), The Lives of Others (2006), and The Baader Meinhof Complex (2008). She has won several awards, including two Deutscher Filmpreis, in 1997 for Supporting Actress in Life is All You Get, and in 2002 for Actress in Mostly Martha.

== Biography ==
Gedeck was born 14 September 1961 in Munich, Bavaria, West Germany, and grew up in Bavaria, the oldest of three girls. In 1971, her family moved to West Berlin, where the 11-year-old Martina debuted as an actress in children's television shows. There seems to be some uncertainty regarding her year of birth 1961.

After leaving school in 1981, she enrolled at the Free University of Berlin, majoring in German Literature and History. From 1982 to 1986, Martina attended acting classes at the Berlin University of the Arts. During that time, she made her stage debut at the Theater am Turm in Frankfurt. Gedeck performed regularly at the Deutsches Schauspielhaus in Hamburg, and appeared in plays in Basel, Berlin, Frankfurt, and Hamburg.

In 1994, Gedeck gained the attention of film audiences with her performance in Sönke Wortmann's hit comedy Maybe... Maybe Not (Der bewegte Mann). In 1995, Gedeck received critical praise for her award-winning performance in the television drama Hölleisengretl. In 1997, she boosted her reputation with her performance as Lilo in Wolfgang Becker's Life is All You Get (Das Leben ist eine Baustelle). In 1997, she received the German Film Award for Best Actress in a Supporting Role for her performance as a shy waitress in Helmut Dietl's Rossini. By the end of the 1990s, Gedeck had established herself as "one of the most prolific character actresses in Germany" with ambitious feature films such as Jew-Boy Levi (Viehjud Levi) and television dramas like Dominik Graf's Your Best Years (Deine besten Jahre). She garnered awards and nominations throughout this period of her career.

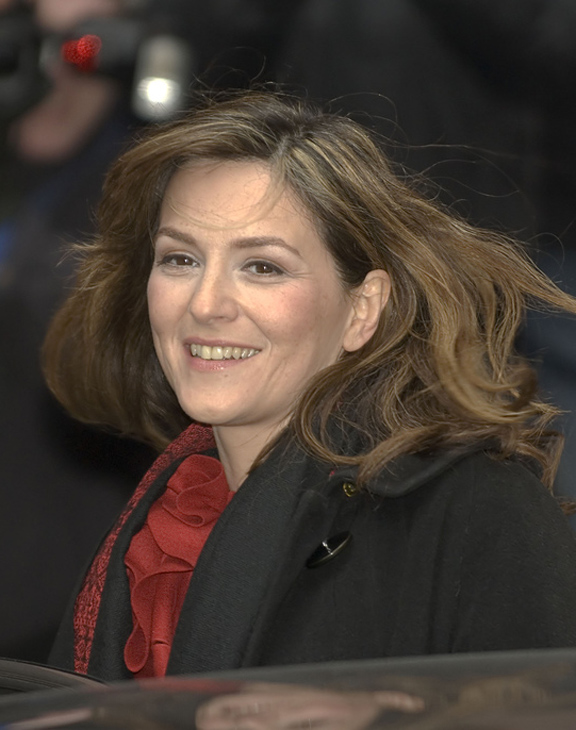
Gedeck in 2007

Gedeck's international breakthrough came with her performance in Sandra Nettelbeck's Mostly Martha (Bella Martha). In the film, she plays a workaholic chef who is forced to adjust to major changes in her personal and professional life that are beyond her control. The film won the Créteil International Women's Film Festival Grand Prix Award, and the Goya Award for Best European Film in 2002. It also received a German Film Award Nomination for Outstanding Feature Film. For her performance, Gedeck received a European Film Award Nomination for Best Actress (2002), the German Film Award for Outstanding Individual Achievement for Actress (2002), and the German Film Critics Association Award for Best Actress (2003).

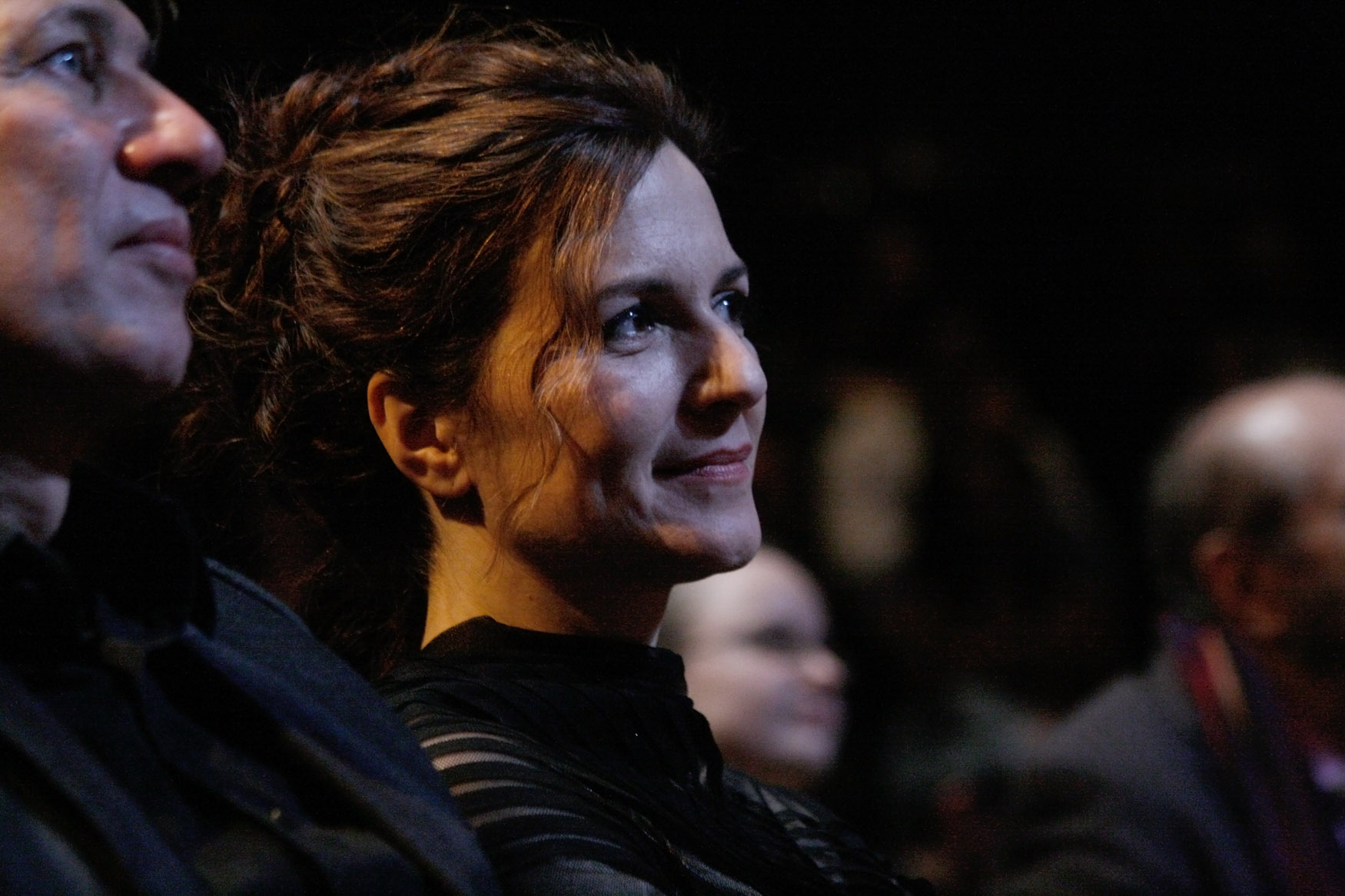
Gedeck at the Austrian Film Awards 2011

In 2006, Gedeck appeared in five major films: The Elementary Particles (2006) as Christiane, The Lives of Others (2006) as Christa-Maria Sieland, The Perfect Friend (2006) as Marlène, Summer '04 (2006) as Miriam Franz, and Robert De Niro's The Good Shepherd (2006) as Hanna Schiller, starring opposite Matt Damon and John Turturro. The Lives of Others won the Academy Award for Best Foreign Language Film.

In 2008, Gedeck played the role of Ulrike Meinhof in The Baader Meinhof Complex. In 2010, she appeared in Jew Suss: Rise and Fall and Agnosía.

In 2012, Gedeck appeared in The Wall and The Door, and in 2013, she appeared in The Nun and Night Train to Lisbon.

== Other activities ==
In 2010, Gedeck, who is affiliated with the Green Party, served as an elector in the Federal Convention to elect the new President of Germany.

In 2013, Gedeck was a member of the jury at the 70th Venice International Film Festival. Since 2023, she has been a member of the Academy of Motion Picture Arts and Sciences.

== Personal life ==
Gedeck resides in Berlin with her partner, Swiss director Markus Imboden.

== Filmography ==
Television

- Der Fahnder - TV series, 1 episode (1988), as Stephanie
- Goldjunge (1988), as Brigitte Katzbach
- Die Beute (1988), as Nelly
- Schulz & Schulz – TV series, 5 episodes (1989–1993), as Britta
- Hausmänner (1991), as Helen
- Mutter und Söhne (1992), as Susanne Stoller
- Leo und Charlotte (1993), as Sylvie
- Krücke (1993), as Bronka
- Das Schwein – Eine deutsche Karriere (1995), as Wanda
- Hölleisengretl (1995), as Hölleisengretl
- Der Schönste Tag im Leben (1996), as Waltraut
- Lea Katz - Die Kriminalpsychologin: Einer von uns (1997), as Lea Katz
- Lea Katz - Die Kriminalpsychologin: Das wilde Kind (1997), as Lea Katz
- Der Neffe (1997), as Isabella
- Bella Block – TV series, episode "Tod eines Mädchens" (1997), as Frau Meng
- Single Bells (1997), as Kati Treichl
- Der Laden (1998, TV miniseries), as Elvira
- Die beste Party - Heimatabend 1999 (1999)
- Ich habe nein gesagt (1999), as Doris Wengler
- Your Best Years (1999), as Vera Kemp
- Happy Hour oder Glück und Glas (2000), as Greta Steinwender / Ladiner
- O Palmenbaum (2000), as Kati Treichl
- Romeo (2001), as Lotte Zimmermann
- Private Lies (Scheidung auf amerikanisch) (2001), as Sarah
- Jenseits der Liebe (2001), as Helen Dubbs
- Die Mutter (2002), as Vera Zardiss
- Verlorenes Land (2002), as Maria
- Andreas Hofer (2002), as Lebzelter-Mariandl
- Geheime Geschichten (2003)
- Unsre Mutter ist halt anders (2003), as Paula
- Schattenlinie (2003), as Clara Lorenz
- Das Blaue Wunder (2004), as Thea Eiselt
- Hunger for Life (2004), as Brigitte Reimann
- Feuer in der Nacht (2004), as Paola Winkler
- Der Stich des Skorpion (2004), as Anne Stein
- Giacomo Casanova (2004), as Madame De Roll
- Spiele der Macht – 11011 Berlin (2005), as Prof. Sara M. Kardow
- Auf ewig und einen Tag (2006), as Paula Schmitt
- Verlassen (2007), as Claudia
- Sisi (2009), as Erzherzogin Sophie von Habsburg
- Tatort (2010) as Jana Maitner
- Halbe Hundert (2012)
- Blank (2013), as Judith Furmann
- Tannbach (2015) as Hilde Vöckler
- Seit du da bist (2016), as Clara
- The Verdict (2016), as Staatsanwältin Frau Nelson
- Arthurs Gesetz - TV miniseries, 6 episodes (2018), as Martha Ahnepol / Muriel
- Herzjagen (2019), as Caroline Binder
- Oktoberfest: Beer and Blood - TV miniseries, 6 episodes (2020), as Maria Hoflinger

Cinema

- Tiger, Lion, Panther (1989), as Nicoletta/Lion
- Hard Days, Hard Nights (1989), as Goldi
- Der bewegte Mann (1994), as Jutta
- Talk of the Town (1995), as Sabine Kirsch
- How I've Got Rhythm (short film, 1995), as Susanne
- Harald (1997), as Rica Reichmann
- Rossini (1997), as Serafina
- Life is All You Get (1997), as Lilo
- Women Don't Lie (1998), as Hannah
- Mrs. Rettich, Czerni and I (1998), as Czerni
- Jew-Boy Levi (1999), as Fräulein Neuner
- Alles Bob! (1999), as Barbara
- The Green Desert (1999), as Doris
- Mostly Martha (2001), as Martha Klein
- Atomised (2006), as Christiane
- The Lives of Others (2006), as Christa-Maria Sieland
- The Perfect Friend (2006), as Marlène
- Summer '04 (2006), as Miriam Franz
- The Good Shepherd (2006), as Hanna Schiller
- Messy Christmas (2007), as Sara
- Geliebte Clara (2008), as Clara Schumann
- The Baader Meinhof Complex (2008), as Ulrike Meinhof
- Bets and Wedding Dresses (2009), as Josephine Campanella
- Jew Suss: Rise and Fall (2010), as Anna Marian
- Agnosía (2010), as Prevert
- Bastard (2011), as Claudia Meinert
- The Wall (2012), as the woman
- The Door (2012), as Magda
- The Nun (La Religieuse, 2013), as Suzanne's mother
- Night Train to Lisbon (2013), as Mariana
- Those Happy Years (2013), as Helke
- The Limits of Patience (2014), as Corianna Kleist
- The Girl King (2015), as Maria Eleonara of Brandenburg
- I'm Off Then (2015), as Stella
- Das Tagebuch der Anne Frank (2016), as Edith Frank
- Original Bliss (2016), as Helene Brindel
- Wir töten Stella (2017), as Anna
- Zwei Herren im Anzug (2018), as Theres
- Lost in Separation (2019), as Doris Lehnert
- Wunderschön (2022), as Frauke Abeck, Julie's Mother
- Dark Satellites (2022)
- Allegro Pastell (2026)

== Awards and nominations ==
Year	Award	Category	Project	Result
1995	Grimme-Preis	Best Cast	Just an affair	Won
1995	Bavarian TV Awards	Best Actress	Hölleisengretl	Won
1997	German Film Award	Best Supporting Actress	Rossini	Won
1997	Golden Lion	Best Actress	The Nephew	Nominated
1997	TelStar	Best Actress	The Nephew	Won
1998	Golden Lion	Best Supporting Actress	Bella Block	Won
1998	Grimme-Preis	Best Actress	The Nephew, Bella Block	Won
1999	Bavarian Film Awards	Best Actress	The Green Desert	Won
2000	Bavarian TV Awards	Best Actress	Best Years	Won
2001	Baden-Baden TV Film Festival	Best Cast	Romeo	Won
2002	European Film Award	Best Actress	Mostly Martha	Nominated
2002	German Film Award	Best Actress	Mostly Martha	Won
2002	Grimme-Preis	Best Actress	Romeo	Won
2002	Preis der deutschen Filmkritik	Best Actress	Mostly Martha	Won
2002	Mons International Festival	Best Actress	Mostly Martha	Won
2003	Goldene Kamera	Best Actress	Lost Country, The Mother	Won
2004	Grimme-Preis	Best Actress	Back to Life	Nominated
2004	Deutscher Fernsehpreis	Best Actress	Hungry for Life	Won
2006	European Film Award	Best Actress	The Lives of Others	Nominated
2006	German Film Award	Best Actress	The Elementary Particles	Nominated
2006	Premio Bacco, Notte delle Stelle	Best Actress	Mostly Martha	Won
2006	International Filmfestival Kaluga	Best Actress	Mostly Martha	Won
2006	Diva Award	Hall of Fame	Outstanding Artistic Contribution	Won
2007	Berlin Film Festival, Silver Bear	Best Cast	The Good Shepherd	Won
2007	Bavarian Film Awards	Best Actress	Messy Christmas	Won
2007	Jupiter Award	Best Actress	The Elementary Particles	Won
2007	Nastro d'Argento Europeo	Best Actress	The Lives of Others	Won
2008	BZ Culture Award	Outstanding artistic contribution	—	Won
2013	German Film Award	Best Actress	Die Wand	Nominated
2015	Goldene Kamera	Best German Actress	—	Won
