= Shaun Whiteside =

Northern Irish translator (born 1959)

Shaun Whiteside (born 1959) is a Northern Irish translator of French, Dutch, German, and Italian literature. He has translated many novels, including Manituana and Altai by Wu Ming, The Weekend by Bernhard Schlink, Serotonin by Michel Houellebecq, and Magdalene the Sinner by Lilian Faschinger, which won him the Schlegel-Tieck Prize for German Translation in 1997. Since May 2021, he has served as the president of the European Council of Literary Translators' Associations.

== Life ==
Whiteside was born in County Tyrone in Northern Ireland in 1959. He graduated with a First in Modern Languages at King's College, Cambridge. After he finished his studies, he worked as a business journalist and television producer before translating full-time. As he said in a brief interview, "Did I always want to be a translator? I certainly wanted to do something that involved travel and languages, but even when my work in television took me to far-off places, I kept coming back to translation, first for fun, and eventually as a way of earning a living." Whiteside is the former Chair of the Translators Association of the Society of Authors. He currently lives in London with his wife and son, Charlie, where he sits on the PEN Writers in Translation committee, the editorial board of New Books in German, and the Advisory Panel of the British Centre for Literary Translation, where he regularly teaches at the summer school. He has stated that he would like to "have a go at Uwe Tellkamp's Der Turm (The Tower), a massive great project but a worthwhile one."

== Selection of translated titles ==
- The Wall by Marlen Haushofer, 1990
- Lenin's Brain by Tilman Spengler, 1993
- The Birth of Tragedy by Friedrich Nietzsche, 1993
- Magdalene the Sinner by Lilian Faschinger, 1997, winner of the Schlegel-Tieck Prize
- The Confusions of Young Törless by Robert Musil, 2001
- Let Me Go by Helga Schneider, 2001
- Payback by Gert Ledig, 2002
- Auschwitz: A History by Sybille Steinbacher, 2004
- Mourning, Murder and Melancholia by Sigmund Freud, 2005
- The Bonfire of Berlin: A Lost Childhood in Wartime Germany by Helga Schneider, 2005
- Napoleon's Exile by Patrick Rambaud, 2005
- Manituana by Wu Ming, 2009
- The Solitude of Prime Numbers by Paolo Giordano, 2009
- Altai by Wu Ming, 2013
- Swansong 1945: A Collective Diary of the Last Days of the Third Reich by Walter Kempowski, 2015
- Melnitz by Charles Lewinsky, 2015
- The Giraffe's Neck by Judith Schalansky, 2015, commended for the Schlegel-Tieck Prize
- Malacqua: Four Days of Rain in the City of Naples, Waiting for the Occurrence of an Extraordinary Event by Nicola Pugliese, 2017
- To Die in Spring by Ralf Rothmann, 2017
- Serotonin by Michel Houellebecq, 2019
- Time of the Magicians: Wittgenstein, Benjamin, Cassirer, Heidegger, and the Decade That Reinvented Philosophy by Wolfram Eilenberger, 2020
- The Visionaries: Arendt, Beauvoir, Rand, Weil, and the Power of Philosophy in Dark Times by Wolfram Eilenberger, 2023
- Annihilation by Michel Houellebecq, 2024
- Killing Stella by Marlen Haushofer, 2025
- The Fifth Year by Marlen Haushofer, 2026
