= Wu Ming =

Group of Italian writers

- Born: Roberto Bui, Giovanni Cattabriga, Federico Guglielmi
- Occupation: Writer
- Writing career
- Language: Italian
- Genres: Historical novel, short story, essay
- Notable works: Q, 54, Manituana

Wu Ming (extended name: Wu Ming Foundation) is a collective of Italian writers founded in Bologna in January 2000 by the authors of the novel Q. The novel, published in Italian in 1999, was still signed Luther Blissett in adherence to the project of the same name (1994-1999). Unlike the "multiple-use name" Luther Blissett, the collective pseudonym "Wu Ming" indicates a specific group of authors.

The group's several novels and non-fiction books were translated in many languages. Some of them are seen as part of a body of literary works described as the New Italian Epic, a definition proposed by Wu Ming themselves in 2008, but later abandoned by the collective.

Wu Ming's books are constantly published and reviewed in continental Europe and Latin America. In the 2010s and 2020s especially Spain and Germany have become significant hubs for their later work, with publishers Anagrama and Assoziation A translating the novels L'armata dei sonnambuli and Ufo 78, whereas only their early works Q, 54, Manituana, and Altai were translated into English.

== Meaning of the name ==
On its official self-presentation page the collective writes: "Why a name in Chinese? After a quarter of a century the reasons, whatever they were, no longer have much importance", after which they refer to the meanings of the lemma 无名 in the Cambridge Chinese-English dictionary.

In Chinese, wu ming (traditional Chinese: 無名; simplified Chinese: 无名; pinyin: wúmíng) means "nameless", "anonymous". Initially, the collective's name contained a pun, because pronouncing the first syllable differently produces Chinese: 五名; pinyin: wǔ míng, which means "five names". Since 2008, Wu Ming has no longer been a quintet, so the wordplay has faded away.

== Members and public personae ==
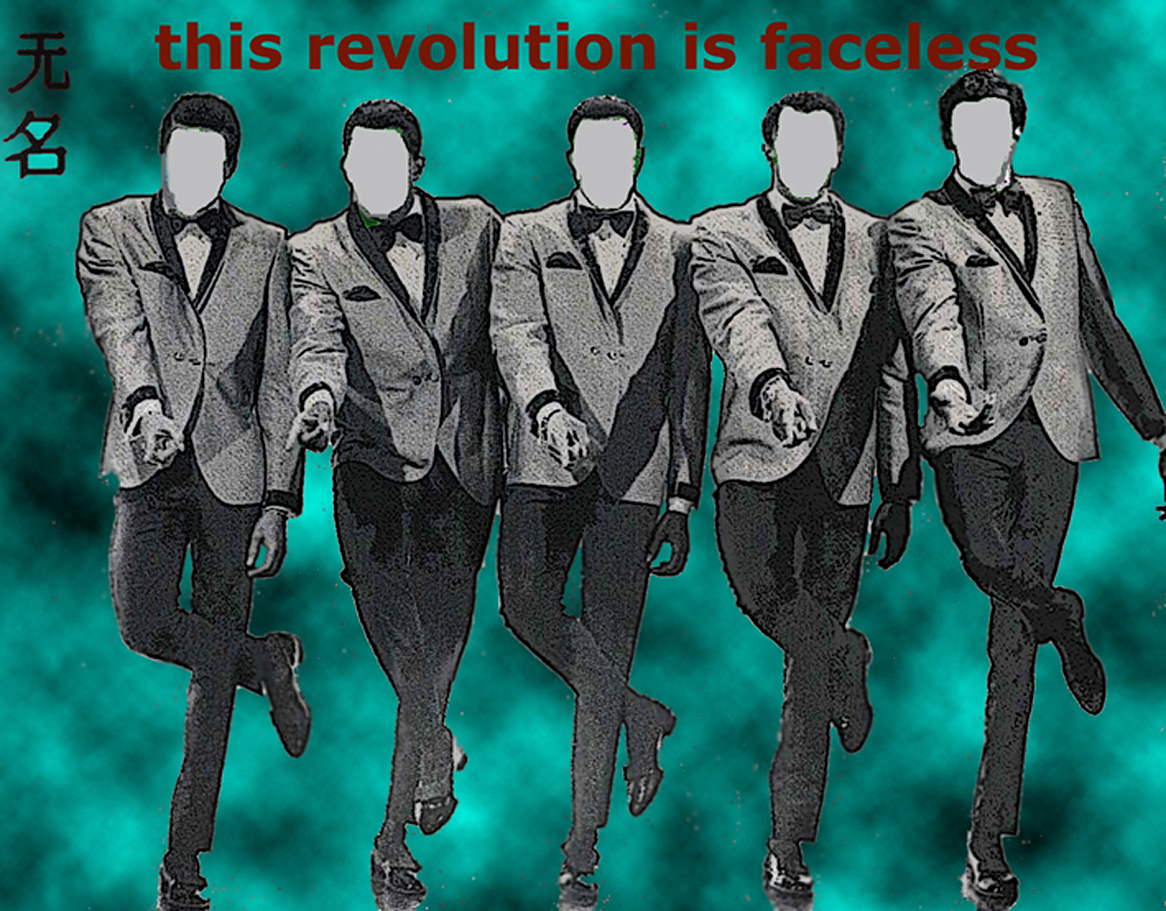
The picture that Wu Ming used as an "official portrait" from 2001 to 2008, when the group was a quintet. Since 2015 they have been a trio.

The fact that Wu Ming means "nameless" has often generated misunderstandings about the supposed anonymity of its members, whose personal names are instead known and also reported on their official website, where they state:

«our legal names are not secret. It simply does not make sense to use them when writing about our books or referring to our work in various ways. In our literary and cultural activity, like so many before us, we adopt artistic names. In our case, they refer to the collective project (Wu Ming) and directly reflect our poetics.».

Since 2015 the team has been composed of:

- Wu Ming 1 (Roberto Bui)
- Wu Ming 2 (Giovanni Cattabriga)
- Wu Ming 4 (Federico Guglielmi)

Each member has an individual pen name, a "solo" production, and an independent, recognizable, authorial "voice."

Former members of Wu Ming:

- Wu Ming 3 (Luca Di Meo, 1964-2023, left the collective in 2008)
- Wu Ming 5 (Riccardo Pedrini, left the collective in 2015)

== Appearances and policy on public image ==
The Wu Ming collective organizes presentation tours, musical readings, and meetings with readers, and its members often appear in public, but only in person, "in the flesh." They adopt a policy of not appearing in photos or videos. Their faces are not even available on their official website. For this reason, they ask readers not to post photos taken during presentations and readings on social media.

The group has explained this position many times. One the most in-depth discussions of it was in an interview with literary journalist Loredana Lipperini in June 2025:

«We care about appearing only in the flesh, which leads us to value as much as possible — and by any means necessary — moments of face-to-face meeting, physical participation, and sharing a place. Not a generic "space": a place, with its own history, its own meaning, its own affectivity and importance for people. If someone recognizes us on the street, it's not because they saw us in effigy, through electronic mediation: it means they experienced one of those concrete and tangible moments with us, and they did it physically, alongside other bodies.»

The most recent recapitulation of this stance and its political importance for the collective can be found in a speech given in Bologna in 2025:

«In the early years of our career [...] there were far fewer cameras around. Today, they are ubiquitous; everyone has one on their phone. And what's more, the compulsion to take pictures or videos of anyone, anything, at any time and to instantly share those images—on social media, in chats, who knows where– has taken hold and overwhelmed any inhibition. Yet we stubbornly try to enforce our philosophy, and we almost always succeed. We are often asked: how do you do it? The answer is simple: we explain. We explain the value, even the political value, that this choice has for us. And people understand. They understand today more than ever before, and they will understand even more, because in an age where anyone's face can be used for any deepfake that an app like Sora can generate in a matter of seconds; in an age when our selfies are sold for billions and used to refine facial recognition and make killer drones more lethal… In such an age, not being photographed is at the same time an act of desertion and resistance. Or at least, of subtraction and friction..»

== Main collective works ==
=== The 2000s ===
==== 54 ====
54 is a complex novel about popular culture, the shattered dreams of the Italian Resistance, and the relationship between Europe and America. Background research began in 1999, after the publication of the group's previous novel Q. Plots were outlined in the aftermath of the Kosovo war. Actual writing work ended ten days after 11 September, on the eve of the war in Afghanistan. These two wars are explicitly referred to in the novel's End Titles: "Begun in May 1999, during the Nato bombings of Belgrade. Delivered to the Italian publishers on September 21, 2001, awaiting the escalation". The events leading to (and following) 11 September are also allegorically described in the book's forenote.

54 was originally published in Italy in the springtime of 2002.

==== Manituana ====
Manituana was written in the 2003–07 period and published in Italy in 2007. It is set in the years 1775–1783 in New York's Mohawk Valley, Quebec and London (UK). Among the many real historical characters that populate the book, the most important ones are Joseph Brant, war chief of the Mohawk nation, and Molly Brant, a matron of the Wolf clan in the Iroquois Six Nations.

In the springtime of 2007, Manituana reached No. 4 in the Italian best-seller charts The English translation was published in the UK and the US by Verso Books in the Fall of 2009.

==== Altai ====
In May 2009 Wu Ming announced that they had almost finished writing a new book, entitled Altai, set "in [their debut novel] Q's world and historical continuum". Later on, they explained:

«We felt the urge to go back to the "crime scene" (our 1999 debut) after the collective lost a member, in the springtime of 2008. After months of crisis and conflict, we needed a new beginning. We needed a peculiar self-managed group therapy... Gert-from-the-Well appeared and told us: “I can help you, if you bring me back to life!”. And that’s what we did.»

The novel, entitled Altai, is set in the late sixteenth century, during the conflict between Venice and the Ottoman Empire. It was published in Italy in 2009 and subsequently translated into English, German, Spanish, Dutch, Catalan, Turkish and Greek.

In his review of Altai in the Los Angeles Review of Books, Michael Thomsen wrote that reading the novel

«is like watching a series of slides through a pinhole, each subsequent entry continuing the story of the last while simultaneously feeling like an entirely new composition. The story does not flow smoothly from chapter to chapter, but rather feels like something that exists outside of the book, and with each new entry adds only a partial view of one aspect, leaving out as much as it manages to include (...) One gets the sense this is not a novel concerned with literariness, but one that aspires to the creation of collective myths that are shared by people across time and culture. At times, it feels like a narrative cryptogram that promises to unlock some yet unseen truth in the reader's present conditions, which might leave them at the precipice of an irreversible act of rebellion.»

=== The 2010s ===
==== L'armata dei sonnambuli ====
L'armata dei sonnambuli (The Army of Sleepwalkers) was published in Italy in 2014 and subsequently translated into German, Spanish and Greek. It is set in Paris and Auvergne during the phases of the French Revolution known as the Reign of Terror and the Thermidorian Reaction. The various subplots weave together the themes of mesmerism and mind control, the relationship between theatre and politics, and the use of masks in popular revolt.

This novel marked both the end of the first part of Wu Ming’s career, during which the collective devoted itself to stretching the conventions of historiographic metafiction, and the beginning of the second, which continues to this day, in which, as they write,

«we engage in new experiments. For instance, we seek an uncanny balance between a careful historical reconstruction and the exploration of fantastic dimensions, which for us include the visionary, the dreamlike, the psychedelic, the mythological, the supernatural... At the same time, geography has become increasingly important in our work, i.e. narrating territories, in a convergence of investigation, travel literature, local history, and critical intervention on environment and landscape.

==== Proletkult ====
Proletkult was published in Italy in 2018 and subsequently translated in French, Spanish, Catalan and Greek. Set in Russia and Italy before and after the October Revolution, it focuses on the writer, scientist, and Marxist theorist Aleksandr Bogdanov, one of the main founders of the Proletkult – Пролетарские культурно-просветительные организации; transliterated: Proletarskie kul'turno-prosvetitel'nye organizacii, “Proletarian Cultural-Educational Organization” – as well as a pioneer of science fiction in the Russian language and author of the classic novel Red Star (Красная звезда).

=== The 2020s ===
==== Ufo 78 ====
Ufo 78 was published in Italy in 2022 and subsequently translated into French, German, Spanish, Catalan and Greek. Set in Italy in 1978, through the events and existential crises of many characters the novel tells the story of the fifty-five days of the Kidnapping and murder of Aldo Moro by the Red Brigades and deals with the peculiar collective fascination with UFOs that spread through Italian society during those months.

In his review of Ufo 78 in La Lettura (the Corriere della Sera’s literary supplement), critic Daniele Giglioli listed the elements of Wu Ming’s poetics that can be found in the novel:

«A candid passion for countercultures, supported by a monstrous (...) erudition in the field. An open-minded attitude, as lively as it is thoughtful, toward that extraordinary treasure of the human mind that is legend—an attitude extending far beyond the opposition between believing and not believing. Compared with their early work, an increasingly clear stance in favor of those people who live on the margins of society without aspiring to occupy its center. A realism that is not "magical"—a much-abused term that should now be abandoned—but one open to surprise, to details that do not quite fit the picture, to trails that may not lead anywhere at all, and in any case not where you had intended to go. A fascination for coincidences that has successfully avoided the paranoia—paranoia is the true villain of the novel; this is important—which Surrealism and Situationism, despite all their lofty cultural defenses, became hopelessly mired in. An ability to grasp the connections between macrohistory and microhistory, honed to a fine point.»

== Relationships between collective and «solo» works ==
In 2024 Wu Ming 1 stated:

«For us there are no sharp boundaries between our collective books and our “solo” books. Indeed, we are using the adjective “solo” less and less, and will probably stop using it altogether. All the books, whether signed Wu Ming, Wu Ming 1, Wu Ming 2 or Wu Ming 4 or by one of us together with a co-author, still come out of our workshop, they are part of a single large body. And they are increasingly connected to each other by a network of reciprocal references.»

«Solo» books have been used by Wu Ming as experimental testbeds for their collective fiction. Early collective novels like Q and 54 relied on traditional—though complex—plot-driven historical fiction. The solo experiments of the early 2010s shifted the collective's style toward polyphonic montages, where the stylistic texture of the book matters as much as the plot.

Wu Ming describe some of their books as UNOs, Unidentified Narrative Objects, meaning literary works that break boundaries not only between genres, but also between different text types. They are not just fiction, nor they are standard historical essays or journalistic longforms. Instead, they merge archival historical research, geographic, ethnographic and autoethnographic methods, and multiple literary techniques.

By writing «solo» works, individual members of Wu Ming can test these hybrid structures without the heavy logistical coordination required by multi-author texts. Solo writing allows each author to sharpen specific stylistic tools. Once a technique succeeds in a solo book, the collective adopts it on a grander scale..

In 2012 and 2013, Wu Ming 2 published Timira and Wu Ming 1 published Point Lenana. These works directly enabled the structure of the collective's major 2014 novel, L'Armata dei Sonnambuli (The Army of Sleepwalkers). The collective imported the solo techniques of inserting raw historical documents, play-scripts, and multi-vocal non-fiction perspectives into an epic about the French Revolution..

Another collective novel by Wu Ming that bears visible traces of the work carried out on the solo novels is Ufo 78, which Wu Ming describe as

«a novel that simulates an UNO written by an implied author [who is not us], about whom we are told nothing except that he or she investigates events from 1978 by working in archives, interviewing eyewitnesses, reconstructing scenes and dialogue wherever the sources fall silent, and occasionally inserting his or her own reflections.»

== Main «Solo» Works ==
=== The 2000s ===
==== Stella del mattino, by Wu Ming 4 ====
Stella del mattino (Morning Star, 2008) is a novel set in Oxford in 1919, shortly after the end of the First World War. Its main characters are historical figures such as J. R. R. Tolkien, C. S. Lewis, Robert Graves, and T. E. Lawrence—“Lawrence of Arabia". Lawrence meets the three future writers when he returns to Oxford to write an account of his role in the Arab Revolt against the Ottoman Empire. The novel alternates between Lawrence’s wartime experiences in the Middle East and the postwar lives of Tolkien, Lewis, and Graves. Stella del mattino was also published in French and Spanish. An English translation by Salwa Khoddam is available on Wu Ming's official website.

=== The 2010s ===
==== Il sentiero degli dei, by Wu Ming 2 ====
Il sentiero degli dei (The Path of Gods, 2010) is a travel narrative and social investigation along the Via degli dei, the ancient route connecting Bologna and Florence through the Apennine mountains. Following the Via on foot, the author explores the relationship between people and territory, focusing on environmental transformation and the memories embedded in the landscape. Walking the route becomes a way of reading Italian history from the margins. The book is credited with rediscovering the historic route, now traveled by thousands of walkers every year.

According to scholar Paolo Saporito, Il sentiero degli dei is evidence of a shift in Wu Ming's literary output,

«from the effort to imagine alternative subjectivities to the struggle to produce such subjectivities as part of a political praxis... Wu Ming’s literary works significantly contributed to their project by offering them and their readers the possibility to imagine an alternative. Wu Ming’s forms of expression actualised this alternative in terms of sustainable dialogic relationalities, post-anthropocentric standpoints, reactions to networks of machinic enslavement and embodied encounters with the world. These actualisations produced knowledge and fostered cognitive experiences that... are there to be embodied and enacted. This enactment, as Wu Ming 2’s definition of the path indicate, will entail the coordination of a complex assemblage of (non)human agencies—indeed the creation of alternative material, discursive, human, nonhuman, online, offline machinic networks that are ready to fight against the neoliberal apparatuses of social subjection and machinic enslavement.».

==== Timira, by Wu Ming 2 and Antar Mohamed Marincola ====
Timira (2012) is a hybrid novel that combines biography, fiction, and historical research. It tells the life story of Isabella Marincola, an Italian-Somali woman born in colonial Somalia and later raised in Italy during the fascist dictatorship. Isabella became a model and an actress, appearing also in Giuseppe De Santis' neorealist classic Bitter Rice (1949), then went back to Somalia. Through Isabella’s memories and with the help of her son Antar, Wu Ming 2 reconstructs both an individual life and a largely forgotten chapter of Italian history. Isabella's experience challenges conventional ideas of national belonging: she is connected to Italy and Somalia, yet never fully accepted by either society. Blending documentary evidence with imaginative reconstruction, the narrative also explores the silences surrounding Italy’s colonial past. Timira has been translated into English by David Ward and published in the United States.

==== Point Lenana, by Wu Ming 1 and Roberto Santachiara ====
Wu Ming 1 described Timira and Point Lenana as "two heterozygotic twins". Point Lenana (2013) is a hybrid work of history, biography, travel writing, and political investigation. At its centre is the story of Felice Benuzzi, an Italian prisoner of war in Kenya during the Second World War who escaped from a British camp with two fellow officers to climb Mount Kenya. Their ascent, later recounted in Benuzzi’s memoir No Picnic on Mount Kenya, becomes the starting point for a broader exploration of Italy’s colonial past. Moving between the mountain, wartime archives, personal testimonies, and the history of Italian East Africa, the book examines how adventure narratives conceal or reshape colonial violence.

==== Un viaggio che non promettiamo breve, by Wu Ming 1 ====
Un viaggio che non promettiamo breve (We Don't Promise this Trip Will Be Short, 2016) is a narrative history of the "No TAV" movement opposing the project of a new Turin-Lyon high speed railway in Italy’s Susa Valley. The book traces more than two decades of grassroots mobilization, focusing on the communities, activists, local administrators, and residents who resist the project. The book combines investigative journalism, interviews, archival material, and participant observation to follow demonstrations, legal battles, police repression, internal debates, and the development of a shared political identity.. In the book in which he analyses Wu Ming's militant practices and discursive strategies, scholar Paolo Saporito wrote that:

«the boldest and most innovative move by Wu Ming 1, as he sets out to account for the complex set of material and discursive agencies at work in the TAV project in the Susa valley, is to draw on Howard Phillips Lovecraft’s horror stories and invent a lugubrious creature: the Entity. This Entity incorporates institutional powers, discourses, communication networks, human bodies, opinions, private interests, capitals, instruments and ideas that defend the construction of the railway. The manifestations of this Entity in the text are multiple, ramified, at times identifiable with a character, at others more similar to a standpoint or a presence that hunts the environment. This diversity is the result of Wu Ming 1’s struggle to find the most effective forms to give literary expression to this complex phenomenon. The narrative of this struggle is part of the book and is presented as a constant, ongoing creative process that informs the representation of the Entity.»

==== La macchina del vento, by Wu Ming 1 ====
La macchina del vento (The Wind Machine, 2019) is a novel set in Ventotene in 1939, when the island served as a place of confinement for opponents of the Fascist regime. The main character is Erminio Squarzanti, a young socialist and former student of classical literature who is struggling with isolation and the restrictions imposed on the prisoners. One day he meets Giacomo Pontecorboli, a Roman physicist and former student of Enrico Fermi, who arrived on the island carrying a secret about the disappearance of physicist Ettore Majorana. As Italy enters the Second World War, Giacomo begins investigating the strange phenomena surrounding Ventotene: its unusual winds, the irregularities of the island’s clock, and the possibility that the island itself may somehow anticipate the future. Characters include historical figures of Italian antifascism such as Sandro Pertini, Altiero Spinelli, Eugenio Colorni, and Umberto Terracini.

=== The 2020s ===
==== La Q di Qomplotto, by Wu Ming 1 ====
La Q di Qomplotto (Q for Qonspiracy, 2021) is a hybrid work of investigative reportage, cultural analysis, autobiography, philosophical dialogue, and literary experimentation. It begins with the emergence of QAnon in 2017, when an anonymous figure known as “Q” started publishing cryptic messages on the 4chan imageboard. Around these posts grew a vast conspiracy movement claiming that the world was controlled by a satanic, child-abusing “Cabal” and that Donald Trump was secretly fighting it. Wu Ming 1 reconstructs QAnon’s development in the US and Europe, focusing on the COVID-19 pandemic, the 2020 U.S. election, and the January 6, 2021 US Capitol Attack. At the same time, the author places contemporary conspiracy fantasies within a longer history of antisemitic myths, moral panics, and popular culture. Rather than simply debunking false beliefs, the book asks why such narratives become persuasive and what social, emotional, and political needs they satisfy. Dissatisfied with the concepts commonly used in the debate on these narratives, Wu Ming 1 coins and uses new ones, and argues that conspiracy fantasies can appear rebellious while ultimately defending the capitalist status quo. The second part of the book is written as a philosophical novel and adopts the setting, characters, and some of the stylistic choices of Umberto Eco's Foucault's Pendulum. La Q di Qomplotto was also published in French in 2022.

==== Gli uomini pesce, by Wu Ming 1 ====
Gli uomini pesce (The Fishmen, 2024) is a novel set in the Po Delta across three different temporal planes, spanning nearly a century of history (from 1923 to 2022) and explicitly linked to the collective novel Ufo 78. In 1944, during the Resistance, partisans Ilario Nevi and Erminio Squarzanti (formerly the protagonist and narrator in La macchina del vento) encounter a disturbing local legend about the “fish-men,” mysterious creatures said to inhabit the waters and marshes around the river. Their experience leaves a lasting mark on both men. In the summer of 2022, the Po is suffering from an unprecedented heat wave and drought. After the death of her great-uncle Ilario, Antonia Nevi, a geographer, inherits a house in the Delta and discovers an unpublished memoir concerning the events of 1944–45. Determined to understand Ilario’s past and his true identity, she begins an investigation that leads through forgotten episodes of the Resistance, environmental struggles, political violence, and the transformations of the Delta’s landscape. Gli uomini pesce has been acclaimed as marking the emergence of a distinctly Italian strain of climate fiction.

==== La vera storia della Banda Hood, by Wu Ming 4 ====
La vera storia della banda Hood (The True Story of the Hood Gang, 2025) reimagines the origins of the Robin Hood legend in medieval England. The novel is set against the background of the Third Crusade and the political struggle between Richard the Lionheart and his brother John. The main characters are a group of young outlaws living in Sherwood Forest, among there is no single hero called Robin. Little John takes on a central role, and the forest itself is an active, mysterious presence inhabited by popular beliefs, trolls, fairies, and other creatures.

==== Mensaleri, by Wu Ming 2 ====
Mensaleri (2025) is a novel set in an imaginary corner of Italy, blending historical fiction, working-class epic, and magical elements. In 1868, the entrepreneur Nazzaro Mensa buys the island of Parpai, on the Leri River, and builds a large paper mill. Across the river he establishes Mensaleri, a model workers’ village designed according to his paternalistic vision. Over more than a century, the village witnesses industrial growth, but also the birth of a secret ritual linked to a mysterious massacre of butterflies. By 1995 the factory, after changing hands repeatedly, has been abandoned. Riniero Mensa, a descendant of the founder, proposes a plan to regenerate the site, which involves a theatrical company working with the inhabitants to bring Mensaleri’s history to the stage. The sharing of memories causes the resurfacing of old conflicts.

== Cinema ==
=== Radio Alice / Working Slowly ===
Wu Ming co-wrote the screenplay of the Italian film Lavorare con lentezza, directed by Guido Chiesa, released in Italy in 2004. The original title means "Working slowly" and cites a protest song, a popular leftist anthem in the 1970s.

The film is set during a student uprising that paralysed Bologna for several days in March 1977. Several narrative threads are woven around Radio Alice, the station run by the "creative wing" (the so-called "Mao-Dadaists") of the radical Autonomia movement. In the morning of 11 March a brawl involving radical and catholic students escalated to a full-scale riot in the university district. The Carabinieri riot squad attacked and shot down a 25-year-old student called Francesco Lorusso. As a result, thousands of students and activists stormed the centre of the town, clashing with the police and throwing molotov cocktails. On 13 March the premises of Radio Alice were invaded and vandalised by the police, the station was shut down and every member of the staff was arrested. The film tells the story mixing real anecdotes with semi-fictional characters.

Radio Alice has won several awards and prizes at movie festivals all over Europe, including the Marcello Mastroianni Award for the Best Young Actors at the 2004 Venice Film Festival and the First Prize at the 2005 Festival de Cinema Politic in Barcelona, Spain.

=== Once More Unto the Breach ===
Once More Unto the Breach (Italian: Il varco, lit. 'The Gate') is a fiction film directed by Federico Ferrone and Michele Manzolini, based on a script co-authored by Wu Ming 2. It was created with archive materials shot during World War II. The film's premiere took place during the 76th Venice Film Festival. In 2020, the film editor Maria Fantastica Valmori won the award for best editing at the European Film Awards.

=== A Noi Rimane Il Mondo ===
A Noi Rimane Il Mondo. Sui Sentieri della Wu Ming Foundation (We Still Have the World: On the Paths of the Wu Ming Foundation) is a documentary centred on Wu Ming. Directed by Armin Ferrari and released in 2022, the film explores several extra-literary repercussions and creative ramifications of Wu Ming's literary work. Through interconnected stories, the film weaves together multiple projects—including explorations of landscape, toponymy, ecology, the legacies of Italian colonialism, and the practice of collective walking—while examining various initiatives that orbit around Wu Ming, from efforts to decolonize mainstream Italian narratives to dismantling historical misinformation and critiquing patriarchal mythologies on mountains and mountaneering. The voiceovers from all three current Wu Ming members provide counterpoint and commentary to the scenes.

== Bibliography ==
=== Fiction written by the whole collective ===
==== Novels ====
- Q (originally written as Luther Blissett, 1999)
- Asce di guerra (with Vitaliano Ravagli, 2000)
- 54 (2002).
- Manituana (2007).
- Altai (2009)
- L'armata dei sonnambuli (2014)
- Proletkult (2018)
- Ufo 78 (2022)

==== Novellas ====
- Previsioni del tempo (2008)

==== Collections of short stories ====
- Anatra all'arancia meccanica (2011)
- Cantalamappa (2015)
- L'invisibile ovunque (2015)
- Il ritorno dei Cantalamappa (2017)

=== Non-fiction written by the whole collective ===
- Esta revolución no tiene rostro (2002)
- Giap! (2003)
- Grand River: A Journey (2008)
- New Italian Epic (2009)

=== «Solo» Works ===
==== Wu Ming 1 ====
- New Thing (2004)
- Point Lenana (with Roberto Santachiara, 2013)
- Un viaggio che non promettiamo breve (2016)
- La macchina del vento (2019)
- La Q di Qomplotto (2021)
- Gli uomini pesce (2024)

==== Wu Ming 2 ====
- Guerra agli umani (2004)
- Il sentiero degli dei (2010)
- Timira (with Antar Mohamed Marincola, 2012)
- Il sentiero luminoso (2014)
- La battaglia della merda (2020)
- Mensaleri (2025)

==== Wu Ming 4 ====
- Stella del mattino (2008)
- L'eroe imperfetto (2010)
- Il piccolo regno (2016)
- La vera storia della Banda Hood (2024)
- Il calcio del figlio (2025)
- Ritorno a Deià (2026)

==== Wu Ming 5 ====
- Havana Glam (2001)
- Free Karma Food (2006)
