= McGuffin =

McGuffin is a surname of Irish origin, thought to originate from County Donegal. It is an Anglicized form of the Gaelic Mag Dhuibhfinn. Notable people with the surname include:

- Meg McGuffin (born c. 1990), American beauty-pageant titleholder
- David McGuffin (fl. 2000s), Canadian television correspondent
- Gary and Joanie McGuffin (born 1959, born 1960), Canadian explorers, authors, and conservation photographer
- Peter McGuffin (1949–2024), Northern Irish geneticist
- Samuel McGuffin (1863–1952), Northern Ireland politician
- Tyson McGuffin (born 1989), American professional pickleball player
