= Julian Pölsler =

Austrian film director, theatre director and screenwriter

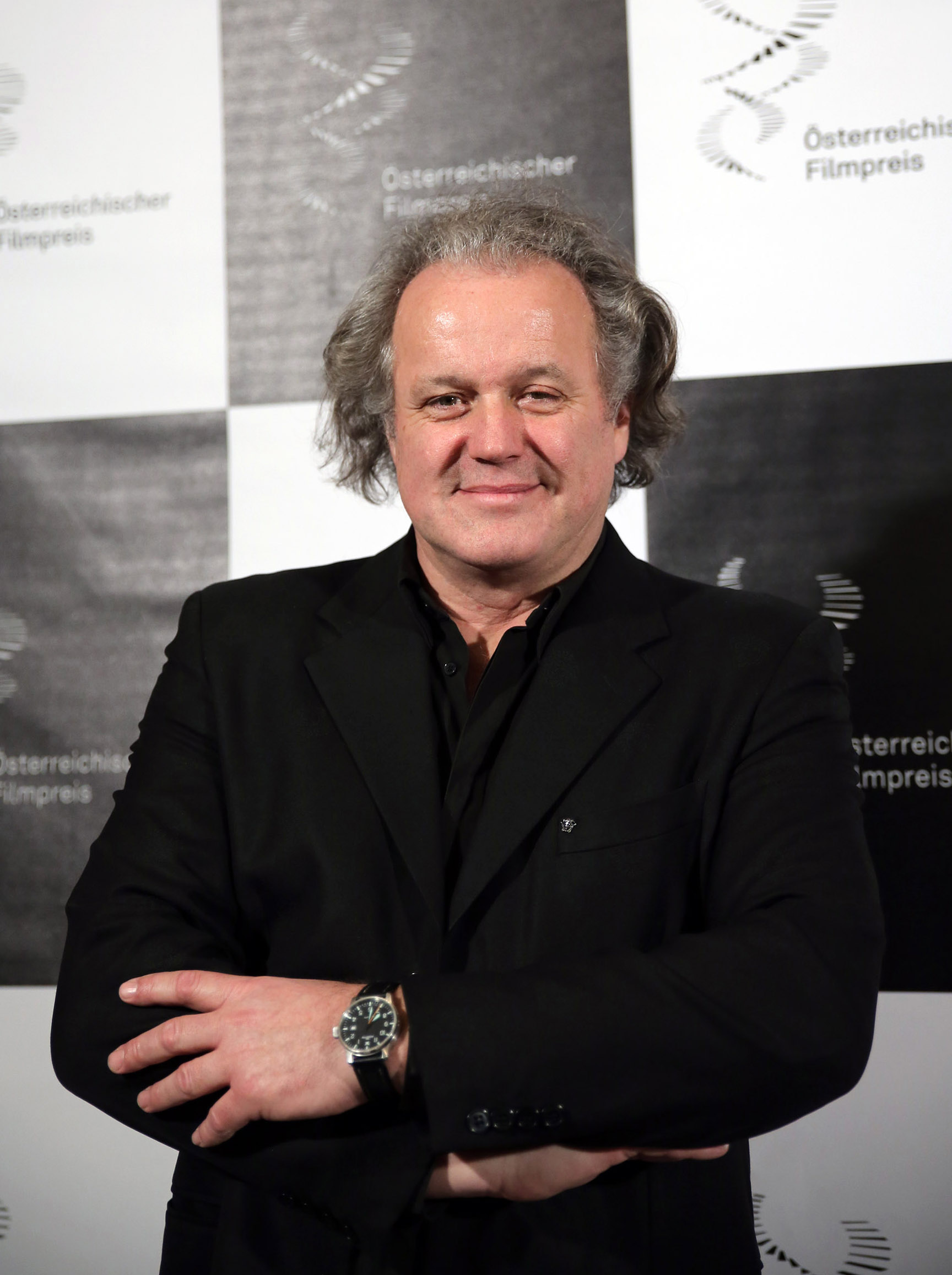
- Julian Pölsler at the Vienna International Film Festival, 2013
- Born: Julian Roman Pölsler; 1954 (age 71–72); Sankt Lorenzen im Paltental, Styria, Austria
- Occupations: Film director, theatre director, screenwriter
- Known for: The Wall

Julian Roman Pölsler (born 1954) is an Austrian film director, theatre director, and screenwriter. Pölsler was born on the Kreuzberg mountain above the village of Sankt Lorenzen im Paltental in Styria, Austria. He studied film directing and production at the University of Music and Performing in Vienna. He also studied directing and dramaturgy at the Institute for Cultural Management in the Max Reinhardt Seminar, after which he worked as an assistant director to Axel Corti.

In 1982, he began directing television films and operas. Since 2003, Pölsler has held teaching positions in the drama department at the Konservatorium Wien and in the computer science and media department at the Vienna University of Technology. In 2006, he became theatre director at Klosterneuburg. Pölsler lives and works in Vienna and Munich. His most recent feature film The Wall won the Prize of the Ecumenical Jury at the Berlin International Film Festival in 2012, and was selected as the Austrian entry for the Best Foreign Language Film at the 86th Academy Awards.

== Filmography ==
Year	Title	Notes
1991	Sehnsüchte oder Es ist alles unheimlich leicht	Television film, director and writer
1992	Der Unschuldsengel	Television film, director
1992	Die Hausmeisterin	Television series, 5 episodes, director
1993	Tschau Tscharlie	Television film, director
1993	Wildbach	Television series, director
1995	Die Kreuzfahrt	Television film, director
1995	Die Fernsehsaga – Eine steirische Fernsehgeschichte	Television film, director, writer, and actor
1995	Auf immer und ewig	Television series, director
1997	München ruft	Television film, director
1999	Der Schandfleck	Television film, director and writer
2000	Wir sind da! Juden in Deutschland nach 1945	Television series documentary, director
2000	Fast ein Gentleman	Television series, 1 episode, director
2000	Zärtliche Sterne	Television film, director
2000	Polt muss weinen	Television film, director and writer
2001	Sommer und Bolten: Gute Ärzte, keine Engel	Television series, director
2001	Blumen für Polt	Television film, director and writer
2003	Himmel Polt und Hölle	Television film, director and writer
2003	Polterabend	Television film, director and writer
2005	Daniel Käfer – Die Villen der Frau Hürsch	Television film, director and writer
2008	Daniel Käfer – Die Schattenuhr	Television film, director and writer
2009	Anna and the Prince	Television film, director and writer
2012	The Wall	Director and writer
2013	Universum History	Television series, 1 episode, director and writer
2013	Bella Block	Television series, 2 episodes, director
