= Marlen Haushofer =

Austrian writer (1920–1970)

Marlen Haushofer

Marlen Haushofer (born Marie Helene Frauendorfer; 11 April 1920 – 21 March 1970) was an Austrian author, most famous for her novel The Wall (1963).

== Life and career ==
=== Early life ===
Marie Helene Frauendorfer was born in Frauenstein, Municipality Moln in Upper Austria. She attended Catholic boarding school in Linz from 1930 until 1939, and went on to study German literature in Vienna and in Graz. After her school years she settled in Steyr.

In 1941, she married Manfred Haushofer, a dentist, and had two sons, Christian and Manfred.

=== Career ===
Haushofer began her writing career in 1946, publishing short stories in newspapers and magazines. Haushofer struggled to find time for literary work between domestic chores, family demands, and helping in her husband’s dental practice. Her commitment to writing was often ridiculed. Haushofer and her husband divorced in 1950, but remarried each other in 1958.

In 1952, she published her first book, Das fünfte Jahr, which earned her the Österreichische Förderungspreis für Literatur in 1953. She went on to publish her first novel, A Handful of Life in 1955, and, in 1956, she won the Theodor Körner Prize for her contributions to art and culture. In 1958, her novella Killing Stella was published.

The Wall, considered her finest achievement, was completed in 1963. The novel was written out four times in longhand between 1960 and 1963. In a letter written to a friend in 1961, Marlen describes the difficulty with its composition:

I am writing on my novel and everything is very cumbersome because I never have much time, and mainly because I can not embarrass myself. I must continuously inquire whether what I say about animals and plants is actually correct. One can not be precise enough. I would be very happy, indeed, if I were able to write the novel only half as well as I am imagining it in my mind.

Haushofer commented a year later in a letter to the same friend:

I am extremely industrious. My novel is completed in its first draft. I have already completed one hundred pages of the rewrite. Altogether there will be 360 pages. Writing strains me a great deal and I suffer from headaches. But I hope that I will be finished by the beginning of May (I must allow at least four weeks for the typing)... And the household must keep on running also. All that is very difficult for me because I can only concentrate on one thing and forcing me to be versatile makes me extremely nervous. I have the feeling as if I were writing into the air.

Her autobiographical account of childhood, Nowhere Ending Sky, was published in 1966. Her overall contribution to Austrian literature, as well as her last short story collection, Terrible Faithfulness, earned her the Österreichische Förderungspreis für Literatur a second time in 1968. Her last novel, The Loft, was published in 1969.

=== Death ===
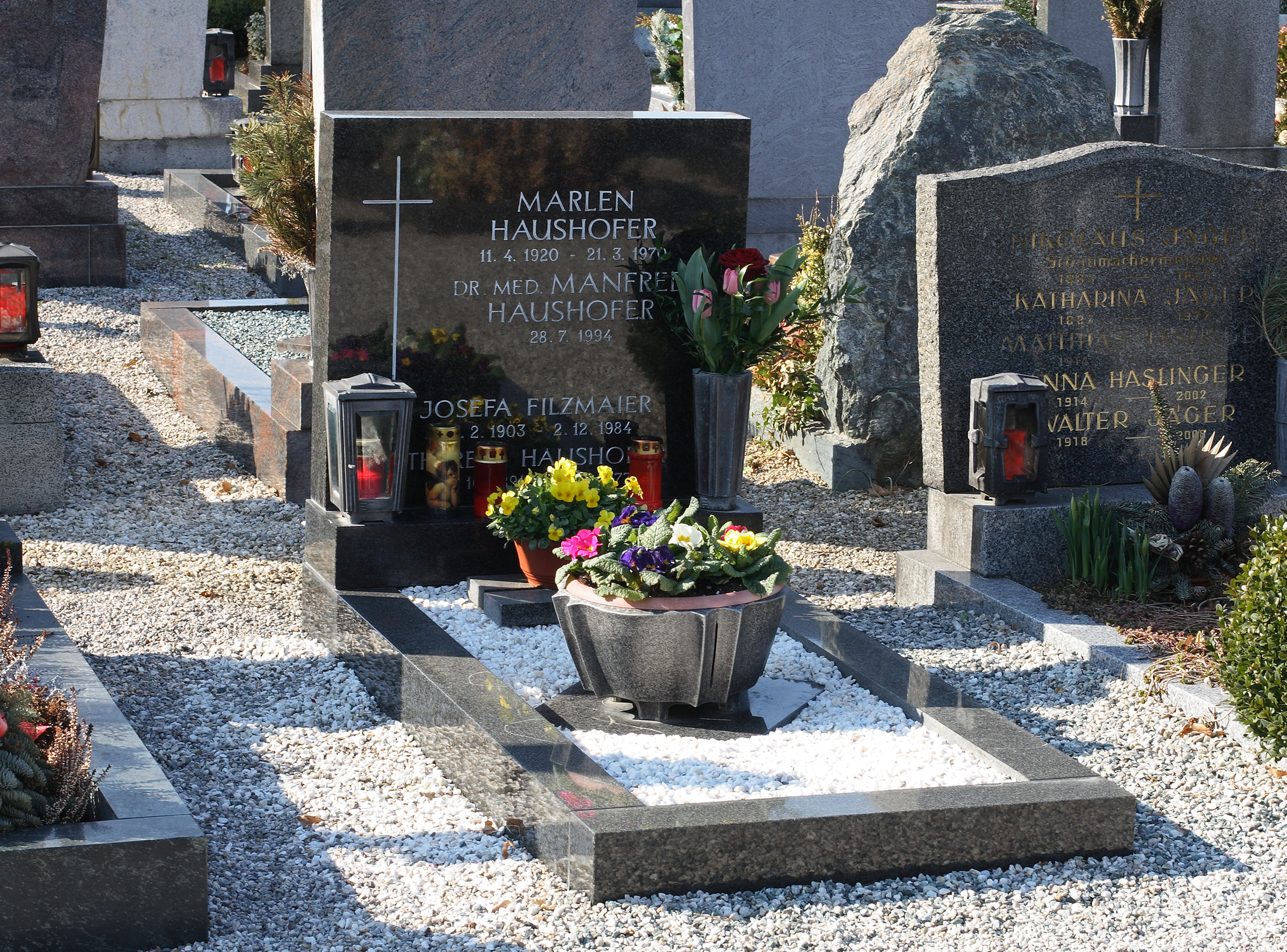
Haushofer's grave in Steyr City Cemetery

In 1970, she died of bone cancer at a clinic in Vienna. She was cremated at Feuerhalle Simmering, after which her ashes were buried in Steyr City Cemetery.

== Style and themes ==
German philologist Ulf Abraham distinguishes four topoi in her fictional work, all of which also have autobiographical connections to Haushofer's own life:

1. a rural childhood idyll of “immoderate” emotions, soon lost;
2. a convent boarding school as a disciplinary institution;
3. a young woman living alone in a furnished room in the city;
4. the “golden cage” of bourgeois marriage and upper‑middle‑class domesticity, marked by ritual, inauthenticity, and quiet despair.

Male characters, according to Lange-Kirchheim, fall into two types: the “an‑archic” vital man (entrepreneur, lawyer, lover) and the “bland, harmless, boring” husband or intellectual. Both are linked to military and bureaucratic socialisation. Haushofer’s female protagonists are often passive and see themselves as “complements” to men; they need to be “awakened” sexually because of a repressive upbringing. The complementary gender relation is presented as a dyad of perpetrator and victim.

== Reception and legacy ==
Haushofer's work was initially in the 1950s and 1960s strictly received as women's fiction by contemporary writers, critics and mentors. In the 1980s and 1990s, the new women's movement rediscovered her work and read it from a feminist lens, noting her critique of patriarchy. Her writing has influenced authors like Nobel Prize winner Elfriede Jelinek, who dedicated one of her Princess Plays to Haushofer.

=== Awards and honours ===
- 1953: Österreichische Förderungspreis für Literatur for Das fünfte Jahr
- 1956: Preis des Theodor-Körner-Stiftungsfonds for Die Vergißmeinnichtquelle
- 1962: Schnitzler-Stipendium des Unterrichtsministeriums
- 1965: Kinderbuchpreis der Stadt Wien for Brav sein ist schwer
- 1967: Kinderbuchpreis der Stadt Wien for Müssen Tiere draußen bleiben?
- 1968: Österreichische Förderungspreis für Literatur for Schreckliche Treue
- 1970: Kinderbuchpreis der Stadt Wien (posthumously awarded)
- 2007: Literaturpreis der Stadt Steyr was renamed to Marlen-Haushofer-Literaturpreis
- 2019: Marlen-Haushofer-Weg in Donaustadt was named after her

== Bibliography ==
=== Novels ===
- Eine Handvoll Leben (1955). A Handful of Life
- Die Tapetentür (1957). The Jib Door, trans. by Jerome Carlton Samuelson (1998)
- Die Wand (1963). The Wall, trans. by Shaun Whiteside (1990)
- Himmel, der nirgendwo endet (1966). Nowhere Ending Sky, trans. by Amanda Prantera (2013)
- Die Mansarde (1969). The Loft, trans. by Amanda Prantera (2011)

=== Novellas and short story collections ===
- Das fünfte Jahr. Novelle (1952). The Fifth Year, trans. Shaun Whiteside (New Directions, 2026)
- Die Vergißmeinnichtquelle. Erzählungen (1956). The Forget-Me-Not Spring
- Wir töten Stella. Erzählung (1958). Killing Stella, trans. Shaun Whiteside (2025)
- Lebenslänglich. Erzählungen (1966). Life Sentence
- Schreckliche Treue. Erzählungen (1968). Terrible Faithfulness

=== Children's books ===
- Brav sein ist schwer (1965). Being Good Is Hard
- Müssen Tiere draußen bleiben? (1967). Do Animals Have to Stay Outside?
- Wohin mit dem Dackel? (1968). What to Do with the Dachshund?
- Schlimm sein ist auch kein Vergnügen (1970). Being Bad Is No Fun Either
