= New Italian Epic =

New Italian Epic is a definition suggested by the Italian literary group Wu Ming Foundation to describe a body of literary works written in Italy by various authors starting in 1993, at the end of the so called 'First Republic'. This body of works is described as being formed of novels and other literary texts, which share various stylistic characteristics, thematic constants, and an underlying allegorical nature. They are a particular kind of metahistorical fiction, with peculiar features that derive from the Italian context.

== Origin of the definition ==
The definition was made by Italian writers collectively known as Wu Ming in March 2008, during the work on 'Up Close & Personal', a seminar on contemporary Italian literature held at McGill University in Montreal, Canada.

Over the next few days the writers proposed and discussed the expression in debates at other North American colleges, including Massachusetts Institute of Technology in Cambridge, within the context of the programme of Comparative Media Studies directed by Henry Jenkins.

From these interventions the author drew the essay New Italian Epic. Memorandum 1993-2008: narrative, oblique gaze, return to the future, published online in the spring of the same year. During the whole of 2008 the expression found a vast echo online, in conferences and conventions, in newspapers, in the specialist press and in radio broadcasts. In Italy, too, Wu Ming 1 put forward the expression 'New Italian Epic' [NIE] in English.

In late 2008 Wu Ming put online a version of the Memorandum marked '2.0', or annotated and extended, with replies to some criticisms and closer examination of the more controversial points.

In January 2009 the series Stile Libero of the Einaudi publishing house published a further enriched and updated version of the Memorandum ('3.0'), entitled New Italian Epic. Literatures, oblique gazes, returns to the future.

== The "memorandum" ==
The Memorandum was intended as an "open suggestion of comparative reading, an album of notes to be borne in mind, remembered, used" and suggests that attention should be paid to a group of works written in Italy over the past fifteen years (1993–2008), seeking unexpected similarities or, conversely, dissolving connections too often taken for granted

The Memorandum has also been described as a literary manifesto, by virtue of the fact that it contains a classification. According to the author and other participants in the debate, the term 'manifesto' is misleading, because this is a document in the form of a pamphlet that does not herald a movement of authors or prescribe anything, but describes a posteriori a dialogue between already existing books, delineating the characteristics of a series of works that go beyond post-modernism, 'NIE is only one of the many, good and different things that are happening today in Italian literature', as the preface to edition 2.0 puts it.

== Characteristics ==
The characteristics of NIE listed in the memorandum are seven in number, preceded by some premisses seen as a conceptual framework. These premisses concern historical and geographical specificities: this part of the memorandum describes in broad brushstrokes the social and cultural context in which the works are born, and to which explicit or allegorical references are made.

The seven characteristics identified by Wu Ming 1 are:

- Refusal of the detached and "coldly ironic tone" that predominates in the postmodern novel. This first characteristic is defined in the memorandum as a 'conditio sine qua non'.
- 'Oblique gaze' or 'unforeseeable point of view'. Experimentation with unusual and unexpected looks. A gaze that sometimes widens out vertiginously to span the non-human as an integral part of the narrative. Underlying these experiments, according to Wu Ming 1, is an ethical and political motivation.
- Narrative complexity united with a 'pop' attitude that often leads to popular success. Many of these novels, are, according to Wu Ming 1, structurally complex and complex in terms of their content, and yet they have become best-sellers. Some examples are Q by Luther Blissett, Romanzo Criminale by Giancarlo de Cataldo, L’ottava vibrazione by Carlo Lucarelli and especially Gomorrah by Roberto Saviano.
- Narratives of alternative histories and 'potential uchronias'. These narratives offer a different possible solution with regard to historical reality.
- Dissimulated linguistic experimentation aimed at subverting 'from within' the register of the prose.
- Unidentified narrative objects (UNO). Not only do many of the texts of the body under examination not fall within any predefined literary genre, they widen the confines of the literary to include textual elements that produce 'disturbing' effects. Among the books quoted in the memorandum, Asce di guerra by Wu Ming, Sappiano le mie parole di sangue by Babsi Jones and the aforementioned Gomorrah. After Gomorrah's international success, many reviewers cited such acronyms as NIE and UNO in an attempt at describing Saviano's book. Writing about Gomorrah on Hindustan Times, Indian author Indrajit Hazra observed that "unlike Truman Capote's "fact+fiction=faction" and its obsessive hankering for details, the UNO slithers about like a beast, sometimes trodding [sic] the path of hard reportage, sometimes flipping over into personal mutterings, sometimes tripping on philosophical ruminations, sometimes diving into novelistic "voices" and sometimes gearing into social theory. And unlike Hunter S. Thompson's 'gonzo journalism', it's dead serious. The UNO's only purpose is to get us reacting violently on a subject using all the tricks known in the narrating trade."
- Community and 'transmedia'. The texts of NIE have the characteristic that they often acts as basic texts for the creation of spin-offs by fan communities. These spin-offs are often present online, and involve various media (films, telefilms, television series, comics, video games, musical compositions, websites).

To this list, with version 2.0 of the memorandum and interventions by other writers and academics, were added thematic constants that may be found in NIE texts, for example the 'death of the founder': many books in the 'nebula' describe the consequences of the passing of a clan leader or founding father, a figure who represented a world that is now in crisis, or has actually constructed a world but has not prepared his descendants to manage the crisis it falls into. By coincidence, in various books this character was identified with the simple antonomasia 'the old man'. According to Wu Ming 1, upon this mythologeme NIE constructs a great allegory of the current historical phase.

In the memorandum, the catalogue of NIE characteristics is followed by a reflection on allegory, which flows into an exhortation to imagine the future and the extinction of the human species with an approach that the author defines as 'ecocentric', and describes as a 'systematic recourse' to the rhetorical figure of the pathetic fallacy, i.e. the attribution to inanimate objects and creatures without consciousness of thoughts and emotions equal to those of human beings.

== The debate in the Italian media and in the cultural world ==
=== Contributions and interventions by other writers ===
The appearance of the memorandum has unleashed, from April 2008, a vast discussion amongst writers, as well as among writers and readers. Online or in the pages of some newspapers (such as L'Unità, La Repubblica, Liberazione and Il Manifesto) almost all the authors mentioned by Wu Ming 1 have taken a position on the subject.

In La Repubblica, Carlo Lucarelli has interpreted the memorandum as an invitation to Italian authors to take a greater interest in the dark sides of the country's national history, and has in turn exhorted them to move towards a 'new frontier that is not only physical (new environments, new worlds to create and explore) and it is not only narrative (new plots, new adventures, different montage techniques, themes and extreme emotions), but also stylistic (new words, new constructions) in [...] mutating novels.

Massimo Carlotto, in Il Manifesto, established a connection between crises in Italian crime writing and attempt to define a new narrative.

Valerio Evangelisti, in a long article in L'Unità, described the various ways in which it is possible to achieve a poetic outcome that he has called 'maximalist'. 'Speaking through systems, historico-geographical frameworks, visions of entire societies, cosmic impulses. One can resort to forms of adventure narrative, as long as the outcome is achieved: making people think, in a realistic or metaphorical way, about the collective perception of an alienated everyday. This is what the authors of the New Italian Epic are trying to do [...]’.

Marcello Fois (prominent novelist of a Sardinian Literary Spring), presenting his own works in France, defined the New Italian Epic as the last development in a trend to recover popular literature, ignoring the diktats and prescriptions of the critics, a tendency begun in the nineties by certain authors (including those brought together in Group 13). According to Fois, the first phase consisted in 'freeing oneself from the shame of making genre literature, without paying any attention to the critics; the second – more recent – phase concerns subject-matter. People have rid themselves of the shame of talking about the Italy of today. They have referred to the contemporary situation of our country through the historical novel.'

The author of noirs and historian of philosophy Girolamo De Michele has intervented several times, online and in the pages of Liberazione, with articles arguing parallels between noir poetics, the New Italian Epic, Neo-realism and the thoughts of Gilles Deleuze.

Intervening in Il Manifesto, Tommaso Pincio voiced his perplexity about the expression 'unidentified narrative objects', at the same time interpreting the NIE memorandum as the signal of a conquered centrality of the novel form in Italian cultural production, after a long period during which critics had viewed it with suspicion.

Later, interventions have been made in various forms and in various media by other writers, including Giuseppe Genna, Michela Murgia, Giulio Angioni, Antonio Scurati, Vanni Santoni, Gregorio Magini and many more.

=== Critical replies and controversies ===
Historian and literary critic Alberto Asor Rosa writes on La Repubblica:

"We may question and doubt everything except what is clearly established. And it is established that in recent years Italy has seen an impetuous blossoming of young novelists. What are their directions? What are their common features (provided that they exist)? It is well known that, until a few decades ago, critical reflection and creative research used to grow together and help one another, but nowadays the former (ie literary criticism) has almost vanished [...] When we look around, the only recent attempt at a theoretical-literary systematization of the recent output was New Italian Epic: Literature, Oblique Gaze and the Return to the Future by Wu Ming (Einaudi, 2009), which deserves praise, if only for the fact that it goes deeply into the matter."

In a review of titles published in the computer edition of La Repubblica, the journalist Dario Olivero writes:

«First came Petrolio by Pasolini. The first organic attempt to write a novel about [Italian] darkness: Mattei, ENI, Cefis, the strategy of tension. Now we’ve gotten Saviano, with an impressive acceleration over the past few years. Lucarelli, Siti, De Cataldo, Evangelisti, Wu Ming. Many started out with noir, following the idea of Leonardo Sciascia and the American thriller: using crime as a grid for reality. They have come much further, to the most important cultural current that Italy remembers since the days of Neo-realism.»

Reviewing the book in the daily paper Il Riformista, Luca Mastrantonio writes:

«'a book which... traces an important vector of contemporary Italian literature. New Italian Epic is a curious cultural hybrid. More like a GMO than a product with denomination of origin... it is an interesting cyberbook of literary theory [...] in this essay you can hear, palpitating, the need to draw mental maps between the books, pair up authors with greater or lesser amounts of judgement, create remarkable points to survey positions and routes in Italian publishing. [26]»

Amongst the detractors is the literary critic Carla Benedetti, columnist in the weekly L’Espresso and lecturer at Pisa University. In January 2009 the Wu Ming collective used a phrase by Benedetti reported in the daily newspaper Libero ("[Il New Italian Epic] is nonsense. It is nothing but self-propaganda") as an endorsement for the publication of New Italian Epic.

After New Italian Epic appeared in bookshops (January 2009), various polemical articles signed by critics appeared in the daily press. In February–March 2009 Wu Ming 1 published online a two-point analysis of the 'rhetorical strategies' employed by detractors, entitled: "New Italian Epic: gut reactions".

== The debate in the international academic world ==
The term 'New Italian Epic' and the body of works to which it refers were first discussed in March 2008 during 'Up Close & Personal', a seminar on contemporary Italian literature organised by McGill University in Montreal, Canada, in which Italianists from all over North America took part.

In October 2008, at the Institute of Germanic and Romance Studies of the University of London a round table was held on NIE, in which the writers Wu Ming 1, Vanni Santoni and Gregorio Magini of the group Scrittura Industriale Collettiva took part, along with researchers and academics from various countries (including Monica Jansen, lecturer at Antwerp University and author of the book The Debate on Postmodernism in Italy), who went on to form a research group into NIE. This group, called 'PolifoNIE', examined the subject in greater detail for the Biennial Conference of the Society for Italian Studies, at which it organised two sessions. In May 2010, IGRS published the minutes of the London conferences in the form of a monographic issue of the Journal of Romance Studies"Journal of Romance Studies" entitled "Overcoming Postmodernism", which was the first scholarly overview of the New Italian Epic.

A round table entitled 'Le roman épique italien' was also organised by the Université de Provence at Aix-en-Provence and by the journal Cahiers d'Études Romanes.

The Memorandum on the New Italian Epic has also been included within academic studies in audio-visual and new media, with particular reference to the non-typology of 'unidentified narrative objects', applicable to the 'hybrid' products emerging from the world of garage media. In March 2009 the PhD programme Planetary Collegium M-Node, along with the School of Media Design and Multimedia Arts of the Nuova Accademia di Belle Arti in Milan organised the symposium 'New Italian (Media) Epic', with the presence of Wu Ming 1, Derrick De Kerckhove, Pier Luigi Capucci, Francesco Monico, and many others including film-makers, artists and media theorists. This symposium gave rise to a permanent laboratory.

In November 2009, scholars from many countries met in Warsaw, Poland, at the conference "Fiction, Faction and Reality in Italian Literature after 1990", organized by the Department of Italian Studies of the University of Warsaw. Several panels were devoted to the debate on the New Italian Epic.

In March 2010, a panel entitled "The New Italian Epic between Pulp and political intervention" was held at the 8th annual meeting of the Cultural Studies Association, which took place at the University of California, Berkeley.

In the years that followed, especially in Anglo-American academia, numerous scholars and critics took up the topic.

In 2015, the American critic and lecturer Timothy S. Murphy published the critical essay How (Not) to Translate an Unidentified Narrative Object or a New Italian Epic, included in: Genre Trajectories: Identifying, Mapping, Projecting.

In 2017 British Italianist David Ward discussed the NIE in his Contemporary Italian Narrative and 1970s Terrorism: Stranger Than Fact.

In 2019 Kate Wilman, professor of Italian Studies at the University of Warwick, published the book Unidentified Narrative Objects and the New Italian Epic.

== Bibliography ==
Claudia Boscolo (ed.), Overcoming Postmodernism: The Debate on New Italian Epic, numero monografico della rivista Journal of Romance Studies, Londra, 2010.

Elisabetta Mondello (ed.), Roma Noir 2010. Scritture nere: narrativa di genere, New Italian Epic o post-noir?, Robin Edizioni 2010.

Valentina Fulginiti e Maurizio Vito, New Italian Epic: un’ipotesi di critica letteraria, e d’altro in: California Italian Studies, 2(1), 2011.

Hanna Serkowska (ed,), Finzione cronaca realtà. Scambi, intrecci e prospettive nella narrativa italiana contemporanea, Transeuropa, 2011.

Giuliana Benvenuti, Il romanzo neostorico italiano. Storia, memoria, narrazione, Carocci 2012.

Simone Brioni, “Postcolonialismo, subalternità e New Italian Epic: Intervista con Wu Ming 1”, in Subalternità italiane. Percorsi di ricerca tra letteratura e storia, ed. by Valeria Deplano, Lorenzo Mari, and Gabriele Proglio (Roma: Aracne, 2014), pp. 275-290. ISBN 978-88-548-7735-1.

Emanuela Patti, Che cosa resta del New Italian Epic, da illavoroculturale.org, 28 gennaio 2013.

Paola Bono e Bia Sarasini (ed.), Epiche. Altre imprese, altre narrazioni, Iacobelli 2014.

Alberto Asor Rosa, Scrittori e popolo / Scrittori e massa, Einaudi 2015.

Timothy S. Murphy, How (Not) to Translate an Unidentified Narrative Object or a New Italian Epic, in: Garin Dowd e Natalia Rulyova (ed.), Genre Trajectories: Identifying, Mapping, Projecting, MacMillan 2015.

Kevin Potter, Utopian Registers of the New Italian Epic. Wu Ming and the Socially-Symbolic Act, in: Incontri – Rivista europea di studi italiani, 30(1):76, luglio 2015.

David Ward, Contemporary Italian Narrative and 1970s Terrorism: Stranger Than Fact, MacMillan 2017.

Kate Elizabeth Wilman, Unidentified Narrative Objects and the New Italian Epic, Legenda 2019.
