= Janszoon =

Janszoon, usually abbreviated to Jansz, was a Dutch patronym ("son of Jan"). While Janse, Janssens, and especially Jansen and Janssen, are very common surnames derived from this patronym, the form Jansz is quite rare and Janszoon itself does not exist in the Netherlands. Notable people with this name or its variants include:

== As a surname ==
- Ernst Jansz (born 1948), Dutch musician and novelist, founding member of Doe Maar
- Frederica Jansz, Sri Lankan Burgher journalist, Editor of the Sunday Leader
- Geoff Jansz (born 1958), Sri Lankan Australian Burgher chef and television presenter
- Herbert Eric Jansz (1890–1976), Sri Lankan Burgher civil servant
- Neville Jansz, Sri Lankan Burgher civil servant and diplomat
- Pieter Jansz (1820–1904), Dutch Mennonite missionary in Indonesia

== In lieu of a surname ==
- Jan Janssonius (1588–1664), also known as Jan Janszoon, Dutch cartographer
- Jan Janszoon (1570–1641), first President and Grand Admiral of the Corsair Republic of Salè, Governor of Oualidia, and a Dutch pirate
- Willem Janszoon (1570–1630), Dutch navigator and colonial governor, is the first European known to have seen the coast of Australia

== As a patronym ==
Since "Jan" was the most common given name in the Netherlands for many centuries, the patronym was exceedingly common. To name a few:

- Aart Jansz Druyvesteyn (1577–1627), Dutch painter
- Aert Jansz Marienhof (1626–1652), Dutch painter
- Adriaen Jansz Kraen (1619–1679), Dutch painter
- Albert Jansz. Klomp (1625–1688), Dutch painter
- Albert Jansz Vinckenbrinck (1604–1665), Dutch sculptor
- Anthonie Jansz. van der Croos (1606–1662), Dutch painter
- Anthony Janszoon van Salee (1607–1676), original settler of and prominent, wealthy landholder, merchant, and creditor in New Netherland
- Christiaen Jansz van Bieselingen (1558–1600), Dutch painter
- Claes Jansz. Visscher, (1587–1652), Flemish draughtsman, engraver, printmaker and publisher
- Diederik Jansz. Graeff, (1532–1589), first illustrious member of the De Graeff family, a rich merchant, Ship-owner and Politician
- Dirk Jansz Smient, governor of Mauritius in the new settlement at Grand Port from 1666 to 1669, when he returned to Cape of Good Hope
- Jacob Jansz. Coeman (born after 1676), Dutch painter of the 17th century
- Jan Jansz Buesem (c. 1600 – 1649), Dutch painter
- Jacob Jansz van Velsen (1597–1656), Dutch painter
- Jan Jansz de Jonge Stampioen (1610–1690), Dutch mathematician famous for his published work on spherical trigonometry
- Jan Jansz. de Stomme (1615–1658), Dutch painter
- Jan Jansz. Treck (1606–1652), Dutch still-life painter
- Jan Jansz van de Velde (1620–1662), Dutch painter
- Jan Jansz. Weltevree (1595–unknown), Dutch sailor and probably the first Dutchman to visit Korea
- Jan Janszoon de Heem (1650–1695), Dutch still-life painter
- Job Janszoon van Meekeren (1611–1666), Dutch surgeon
- Johannes Jansz. van Bronckhorst (1627–1656), Dutch painter
- Laurens Janszoon Coster (1370–1440), Dutch potential inventor of the printing press
- Lenaert Jansz de Graeff (1530–1578), son of Jan Pietersz Graeff, a rich cloth merchant from Amsterdam
- Lucas Janszoon Waghenaer (1533–1606), Dutch chief officer and cartographer
- Matthias Jansz van Geuns (1758–1839), Dutch Mennonite teacher and minister
- Michiel Jansz van Middelhoven (1562–1638), Dutch theologian
- Michiel Jansz. van Mierevelt, (1567–1641), Dutch painter
- Pieter Jansz (1612–1672), Dutch painter
- Pieter Jansz van Asch (1603–1678), Dutch painter
- Pieter Jansz van Ruyven (1651–1719), Dutch painter
- Pieter Jansz. Saenredam (1597–1665), Dutch painter
- Quirijn Jansz Damast (1580–1638), was a Dutch linen weaver and mayor of Haarlem
- Salomon Jansz van den Tempel (1633–1673), Dutch master shipbuilder
- Vechter Jansz van Teffelen (1563–1619), Dutch malt maker and mayor of Haarlem
- Vincent Jansz van der Vinne (1736–1811), Dutch painter

== See also ==
- Janszoon voyage of 1605–06 – first recorded European landing on the Australian continent in 1606
- Project Laurens Janszoon Coster, collection of Dutch high literature on the web
