= Mennonites in the Netherlands =

Religious community

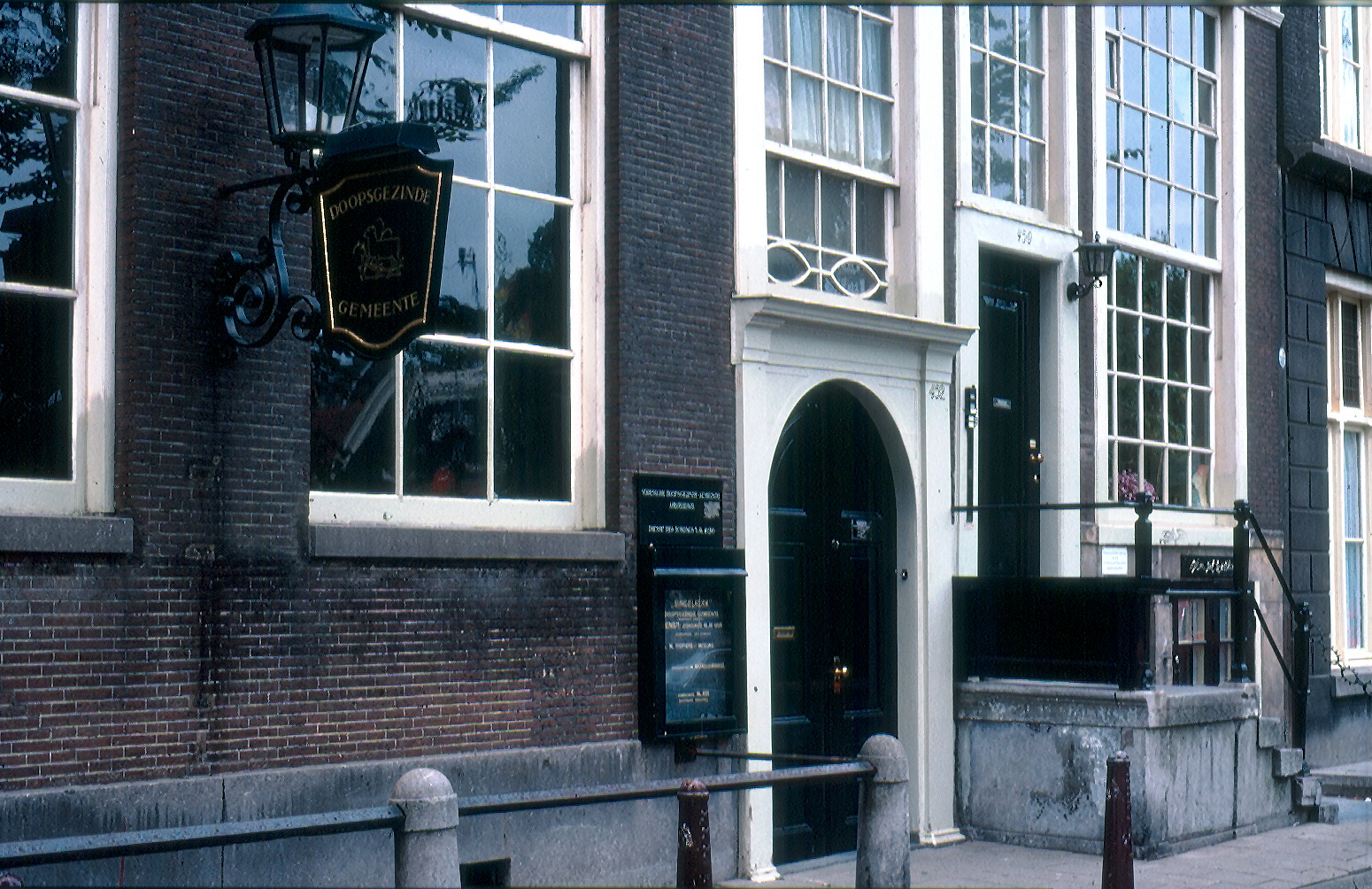
Doopsgezinde Gemeente, Amsterdam

The Mennonite Church in the Netherlands, or Algemene Doopsgezinde Sociëteit, is a body of Mennonite Christians in the Netherlands. The Mennonites (or Mennisten or Doopsgezinden) are named for Menno Simons (1496–1561), a Dutch Roman Catholic priest from the province of Friesland who converted to Anabaptism around 1536. He was re-baptized as an adult in 1537 and became part (and soon leader) of the Dutch Anabaptist movement.

In 1811, different regional churches merged to form the Algemene Doopsgezinde Sociëteit (doopsgezind, "baptism-minded"). The Mennonite Church in the Netherlands is a member of the Mennonite World Conference and in 2015 reported 7,230 members in 111 congregations.

== General characteristics ==
The doopsgezinden ("baptism-minded") or the Algemene Doopsgezinde Sociëteit (General Baptism-minded Society) are a religious community in the Netherlands that can be considered the Dutch branch of the Mennonites. In the Netherlands they are at times also called Mennists.

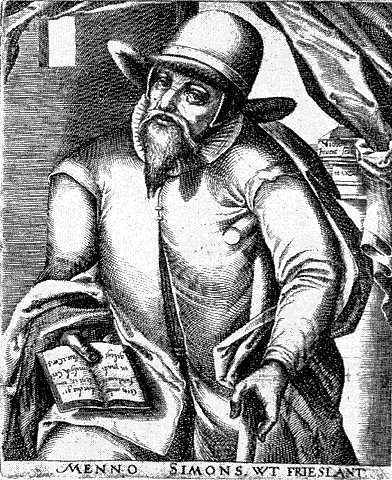
Menno Simons

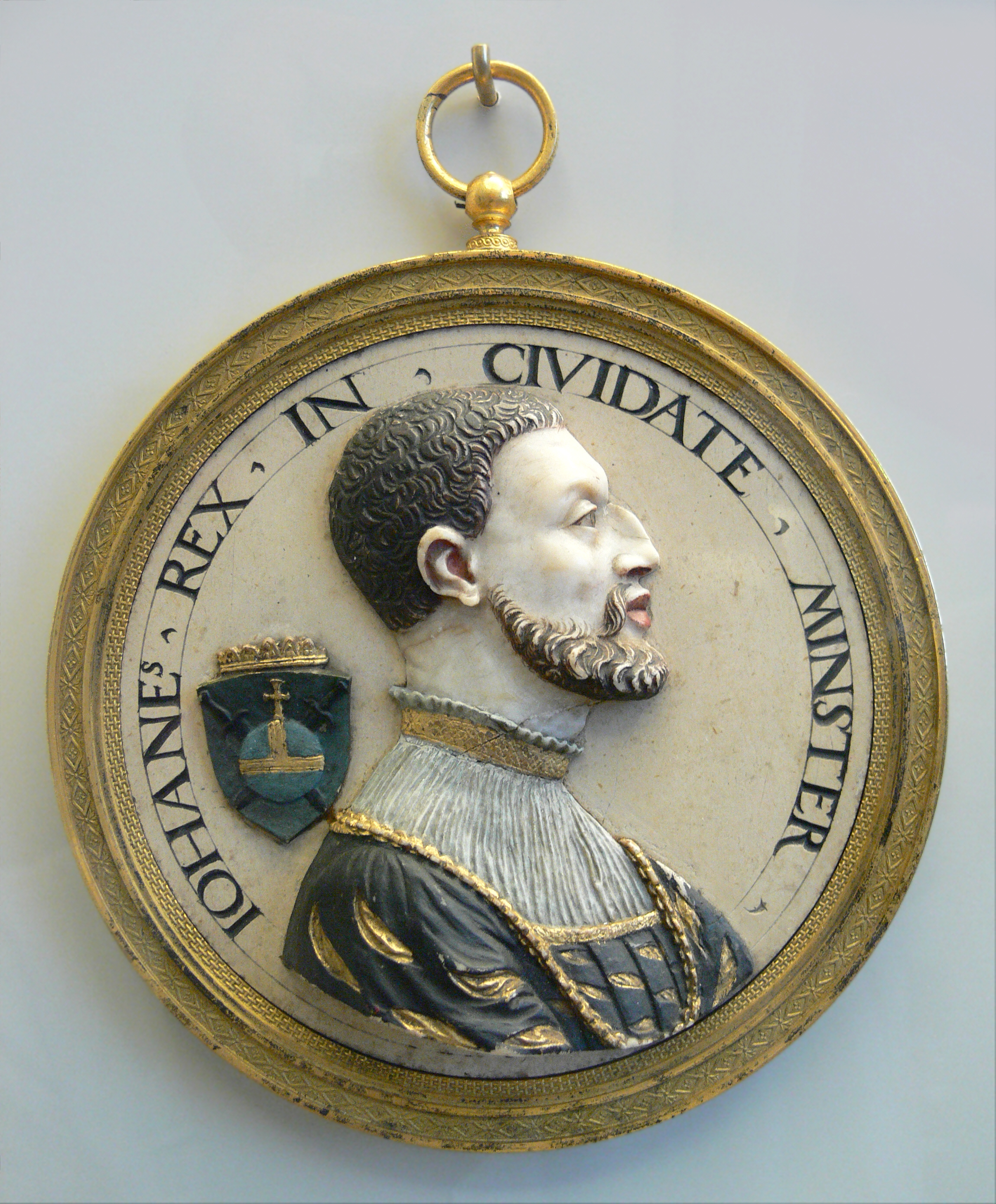
Jan van Leiden ca 1535

The current Dutch name doopsgezinden arose around 1800 to replace earlier names, like mennonieten/me(n)nisten or dopersen. The name refers to the movement's specific views on baptism. Rather than baptizing infants as is usual in many other denominations, baptism is reserved for adults. Prior to baptism a person writes a personal statement of confession and becomes a full member of the community upon being baptized. The confession is not necessarily based on any prescribed forms or dogmatic rules, in contrast to what is customary in the "Protestantse Kerk in Nederland", the largest Protestant denomination in the country; a denomination that unifies a number of Calvinist and Lutheran traditions.

Another characteristic of the doopsgezinden is that they reject military service and the bearing of arms. In the past, this stance has extended to all service for the state. In the days of the Dutch Republic, this position brought the community into conflict with local and Stadholderly authorities, because the church members refused to participate in the city's militia. In place of such service, however, they often did participate and contribute to the fire brigades in many places.

== History ==
=== Founding years ===
Mennonites are the followers of Menno Simons (1496–1561), who was born in Witmarsum, Friesland. Simons is considered one of the best known leaders of the Reformation alongside Luther, Calvin and Zwingli. Simons is the only widely recognized Reformer of Dutch descent.

Anabaptism appeared in the Netherlands by 1530, when Melchior Hoffman (1495–1543) visited Emden in East Frisia. While there, Hoffman baptized more than 100 adults who converted to Anabaptism. The early years saw a number of, at times, rather fanatical, even violent, developments under Anabaptist-associated groups, like the Batenburgers. A similar violent take-over of the city of Münster was subsequently repressed.

=== After 1536 ===
After the demise of the Anabaptist rule in Münster (1534–1536, under Jan van Leiden), Menno Simons became the pivotal person who inspired the movement known as the (Ana)baptists. This movement was fiercely repressed and persecuted by many, including the Lutheran church. After 1536, Menno Simons was mostly active in organizing congregations in what are now the German states of Lower Saxony and Schleswig-Holstein, but congregations were also founded in his homeland of the Netherlands.

=== 16th and 17th centuries ===
Soon after Menno's death, his followers in the Netherlands split into a number of local factions. There were Waterlandic, Frisian and Flemish denominations. In the second half of the 16th century many Frisian and Flemish Mennonites from the Netherlands moved to the Vistula Delta, where they established settlements that flourished until the 1770s. Many of these Vistula delta Mennonites later moved to the Russian Empire and from there to North and Latin America. Today there several hundred thousands of these so-called Russian Mennonites, who are of Dutch descent and speak Plautdietsch.

After 1664, there was another schism. One of the groups was founded by the preacher Galenus Abraham de Haen from Zierikzee. Members of that group are known as the "Lammists." A different group, known as the "Sonnists," arose under the preacher Samuel Apostool. Lammists were more liberal and Sonnists were stricter. In 1735, the Sonnists founded their own Mennonite seminary in Amsterdam. In 1801, the two groups united again.

During the Republic, which was dominated by Calvinism, the Menists found themselves in a position similar to that of the Jews and the Catholics. They were tolerated as long as they did not practice their religion too openly. Churches had to be built in inconspicuous places, hidden from view. In some places, they can still be found in the middle of a block behind the houses, e.g. in Grouw, Haarlem, Deventer and Joure. In this period, the community was mostly of an orthodox nature as the usual name of the churches the “Vermaning” (Admonition) indicates. Many walks of life and professions were not open to the community, e.g. they were not admitted into the guilds. Many members, therefore, became merchants or earned their living in financial services. In the heyday of the Dutch Republic, the Golden Age of the seventeenth century, many of the Menists came into considerable wealth. The region of the river Vecht above Utrecht is still known as the "Menists' Heaven", because of its many opulent mansions.

=== 18th century and the Napoleonic period ===
From the 18th century onward, many Menists evolved from a rather orthodox view to a decidedly liberal one. At the end of the century, there was considerable upheaval and the "patriots" inspired by events in the American colonies strove for sweeping reform in the rather archaic institutions of the Republic. In the Batavian Revolution of 1795, a disproportionately large number of 'doopsgezinden', as they started to call themselves, could be found amongst the "patriots" and they played an active role in the emancipation of groups that, like themselves, had been excluded from full citizenship. In 1806, the old guilds were finally abolished and all professions became open to the Menists. However, the customary right to refuse military service was now denied them.

=== 19th century ===
In the century that followed, many of the more orthodox members of the 'doopsgezinden' decided to leave and join the more conservative Dutch Reformed Church. The remaining Mennists acquired a more and more progressive signature, quite in contrast to their fellow Mennists overseas.

Mission work among the group also began in the 19th century, carrying into the early 20th century. The group chose Central Java and New Guinea as mission fields. Strong ties still exist between these communities (now in Indonesia) and today's Dutch groups.

=== Modern church ===
The Mennonite Church was the first denomination in the Netherlands to allow women to be ordained as ministers. The church first adopted acceptance of women to the priesthood in 1905. In 1911, Anne Zernike became the first woman minister in the country. Her ministry started in the Frisian town of Bovenknijpe (near Heerenveen).

By 2007, there were 118 "Doopsgezinde" congregations with a total of 8,362 members. These were located mostly in the provinces Friesland and North Holland, and in cities along the river IJssel. In 2015 they had 7,230 members in 111 congregations.

== Beliefs ==
=== Marriage ===
The church ordains LGBTQ people. The first blessings of same-sex unions took place in 1986. A 2001 resolution allows local churches to decide about blessings of same-sex marriage.
