= Deaf-mute =

Person who is both unable to hear and speak

Deaf-mute is a term which was used historically to identify a person who was either deaf and used sign language or both deaf and could not speak. The term continues to be used to refer to deaf people who cannot speak an oral language or have some degree of speaking ability, but choose not to speak because of the negative or unwanted attention atypical voices sometimes attract. Such people communicate using sign language. Some consider it to be a derogatory term if used outside its historical context; the preferred term today is simply deaf.

== Historical usage of deaf-mute and other terms ==
=== United Kingdom ===
In 19th-century British English mute and dumb meant 'non-speaking', and were not pejorative terms. For example, in 1889 Queen Victoria instigated the Royal Commission on The Blind, the Deaf and Dumb etc. in the United Kingdom. The intention was to examine contemporary education and employment of blind or deaf people, with a view to improving conditions for them. By the 1840s, it was estimated that one person in 1,622 of the population in the United Kingdom was classed as a deaf-mute. The Oxford English Dictionary states that the North American pejorative usage of the word "dumb" to imply stupidity was first noted in the UK in 1928. According to the OED, deaf-mute was coined in the early 19th century as a medical term for an inability to speak as a consequence of deafness. There is no mention of offensiveness of this term in the UK.

=== North America ===
The primary definition of dumb in Webster's Dictionary is "lacking intelligence" or "stupid". Its second definition of the word is "lacking the ability to speak ... now often offensive". Webster's definition of "mute", on the other hand, gives the adjectival meaning as "unable to speak", whereas one of its usages as a noun is "a person who cannot speak ... sometimes offensive".

In informal American English the term dumb is sometimes used to refer to other hearing people in jest, to chide, or to invoke an image of someone who refuses to employ common sense or who is unreliable. In the past deaf-mute was used to describe deaf people who used sign language, but in modern times, the term is frequently viewed today as offensive and inaccurate. From antiquity (as noted in the Code of Hammurabi) until recent times, the terms deaf-mute and deaf and dumb were sometimes considered analogous to stupid by some hearing people. The simple identity of deaf has been embraced by the community of signing deaf people since the foundations of public deaf education in the 18th century and remains the preferred term of reference or identity for many years. Within the deaf community there are some who prefer the term Deaf (upper-case D) to deaf (lower-case) as a description of their status and identity.

=== Jewish law ===
Classification as a deaf-mute has a particular importance in Jewish law. Because historically it was thought impossible to teach or communicate with them, deaf-mutes were not moral agents, and therefore were unable to own real estate, act as witnesses, or be punished for any crime. However, today when techniques for educating deaf people are known, they are no longer classed as such.

== Deaf-mute people in history ==
The Ottoman Sultans used people referred to as "congenital deaf-mutes" (called in Turkish dilsiz or bizeban, i.e. 'mute' or 'without tongue') in their own personal service from the 15th century to the end of the Ottoman Empire. Due to their nature, they were often entrusted with confidential and delicate missions, including executions.

== Deaf-muteness in art and literature ==
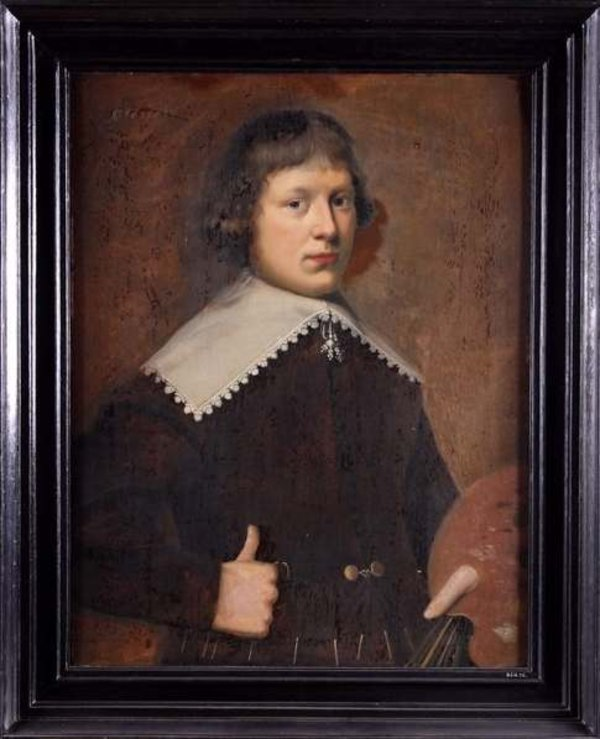
Jan Jansz. de Stomme, a deaf-mute 17th century Dutch Golden Age portrait painter.

Stephen King's novel The Stand features a main character named Nick Andros who is referred to as "deaf-mute." Though deaf people almost always have a voice, King interpreted the term literally and made Nick unable to vocalize. However, he could read lips and make himself clearly understood by pantomiming and in writing.

The phrase is used in The Catcher in the Rye to indicate someone who does not speak his mind, and hears nothing, in effect becoming isolated from the world.

Chief Bromden, in One Flew Over the Cuckoo's Nest, is believed by all to be deaf and mute, but in fact he can hear and speak; he does not let anyone know this because, as he grew up, he was not spoken to (making him "deaf") and ignored (making him "mute").

The character Singer in the novel The Heart Is a Lonely Hunter, written in 1940, is referred to as "deaf-mute" throughout.

In the classic Zorro stories, television series, etc. Zorro's aid Bernardo, a mute, pretends that he can also not hear, in order to get information to aid his master in his fight for justice.

In the early 87th Precinct novels written by Ed McBain, Teddy Carella, the wife of Detective Steve Carella, was referred to as a "deaf-mute," but in later books, McBain stopped using the term. In the foreword to a reprinted edition of The Con Man, originally published in 1957, McBain says, "A reader pointed out to me two or three years ago that this expression was now considered derogatory. Out the window it went, and Teddy is now speech-and-hearing impaired."
