= Jan Gerritsz van Bronckhorst =

Dutch painter

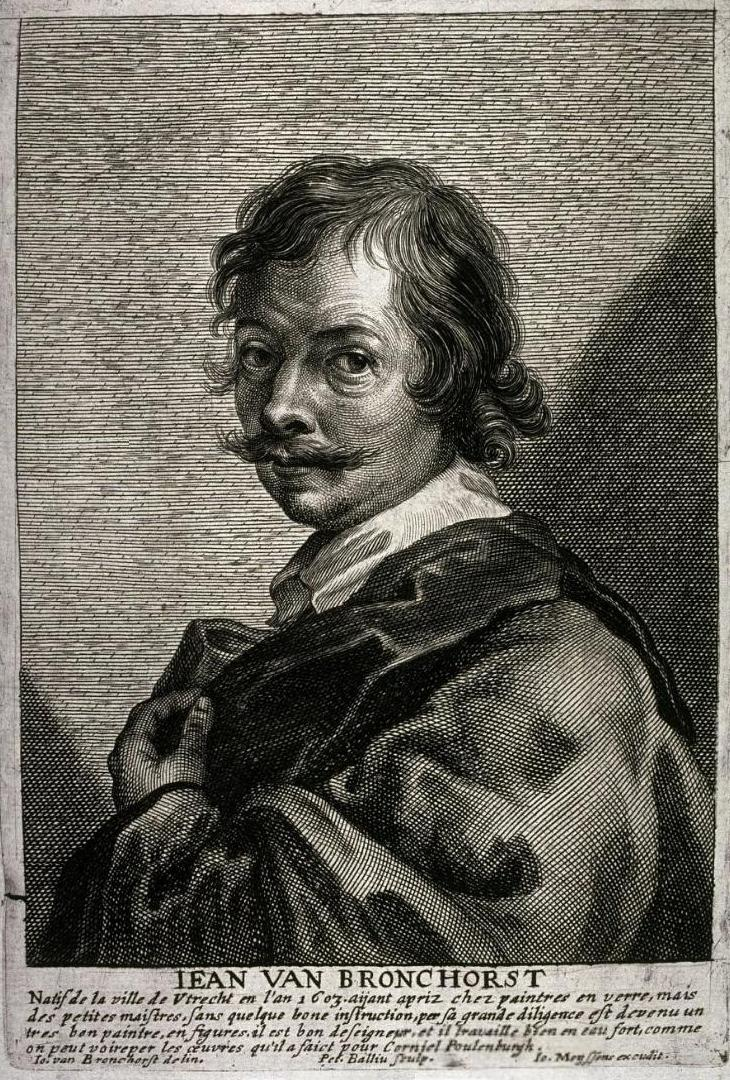
- 'Jean van Bronchorst by Pieter Bailliu after a selfportrait, published in Cornelis de Bie's Gulden Cabinet in 1662.
- Born: Jan Gerritsz; 1603; Utrecht
- Died: 1661 (aged 57–58); Amsterdam
- Known for: Painting
- Movement: Baroque

Jan Gerritsz van Bronckhorst (also Bronchorst or Bronkhorst; 1603–1661) was a Dutch Golden Age painter and engraver. He is considered today to be a minor member of the Utrecht Caravaggisti.

== Biography ==
According to Arnold Houbraken, van Bronckhorst apprenticed as an eleven-year-old with the glass engraver Verburgh in Utrecht. He worked with him for 6 months and worked with two other Utrecht glassworkers before embarking on a Grand Tour in 1620. He did not get far before he was offered work in Arras by the glassworker Peeter Matthys. After six months, he continued to Paris in 1620, where he worked with the glassworker Chamu. He returned to Utrecht in 1622, where Cornelis Poelenburg taught him to paint. He married Catalijntje van Noort in 1626. He frequented the studio of Gerard van Honthorst. In 1647 he moved to Amsterdam where he created the stained glass windows and the organ doors (almost the only area in a Calvinist church where figurative painting was sometimes allowed) of the Nieuwe Kerk (finished in 1655). He has been described as the last of the great stained glass painters in Holland. Unlike his work for churches, his secular paintings show the influence of Caravaggio, and also show a striking appeal to sensuality. Among his pupils are counted his sons Jan Jansz and Gerrit Jansz, and Cesar van Everdingen.

Selected artwork

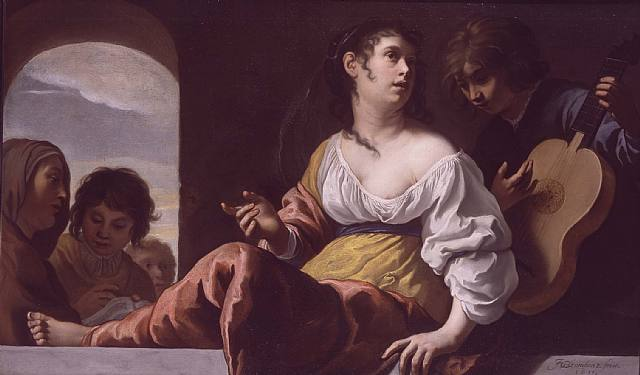
Musical Company at a Balustrade

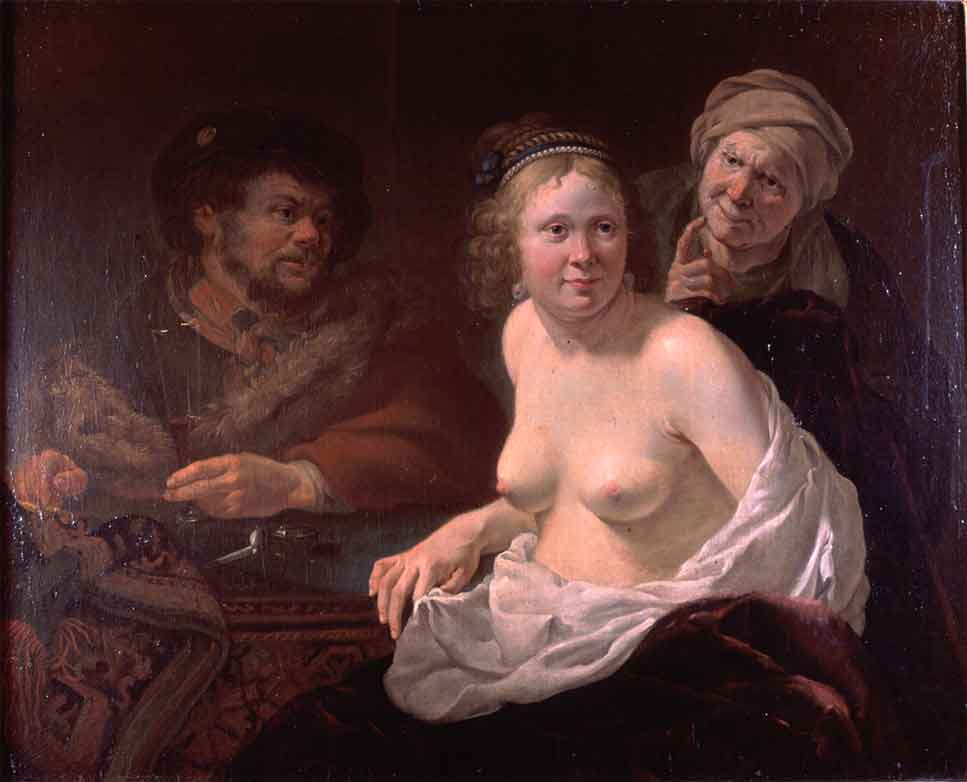
The procuress, 1636–1638, Brukenthal National Museum

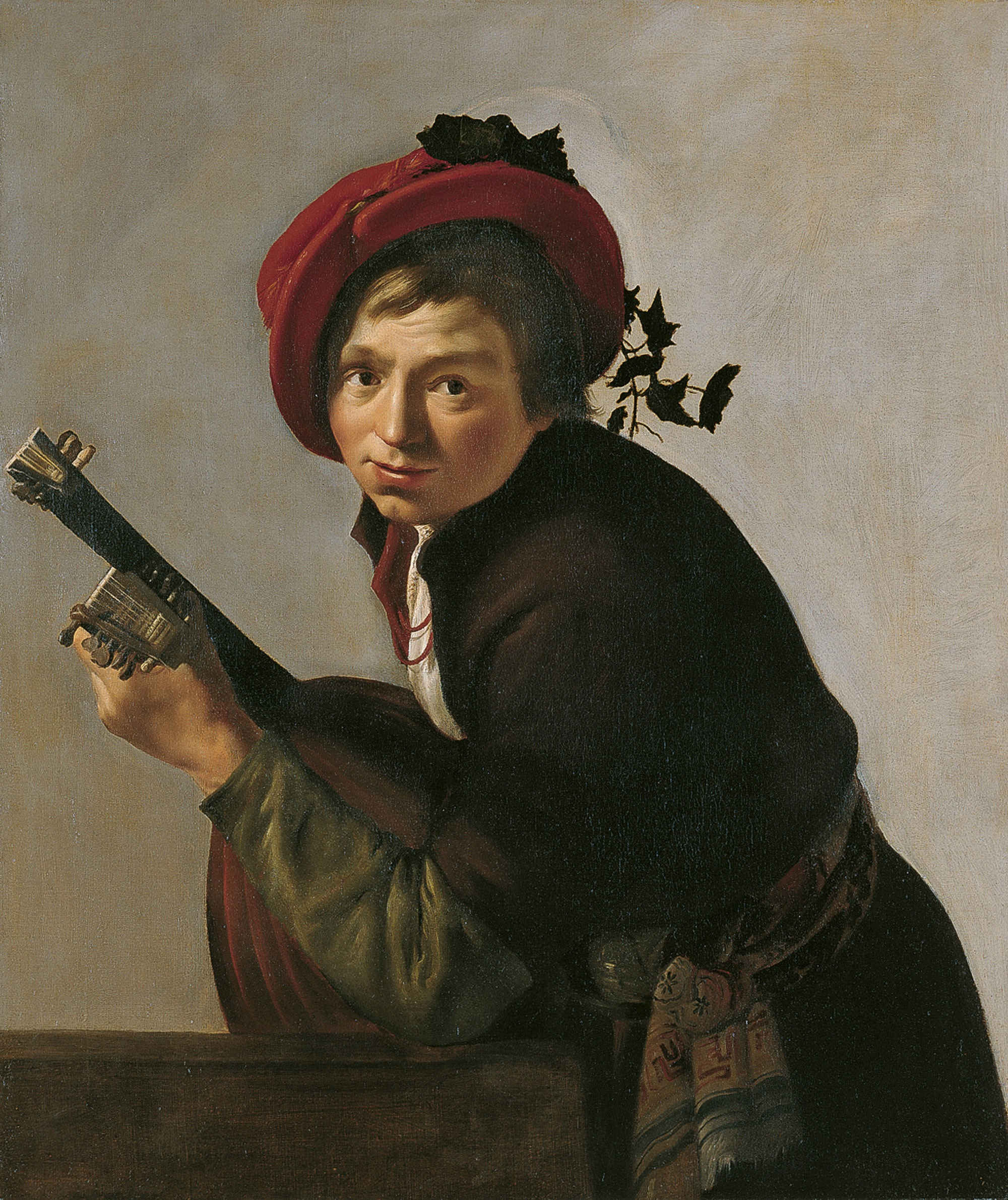
Young man playing a theorbo, 1642–1645, Museo Thyssen-Bornemisza

== Sources ==
- De Bie, Cornelis, biography of Jan Bronckhorst in Het Gulden Cabinet, 1662, p 278, on Google Books
- Baldinucci, Filippo (1728). Notizie de' Professori del Disegno, Da Cimabue in qua, Secolo V. dal 1610. al 1670. Distinto in Decennali. Stamperia S.A.R. per li Tartini, e Franchi (Googlebooks entry). p. 379.
- Web Gallery of Art biography
- Jan Gerritsz van Bronckhorst on Artnet
