= Javanese Mennonite Church =

Branch of the Mennonite Church located in Java, Indonesia

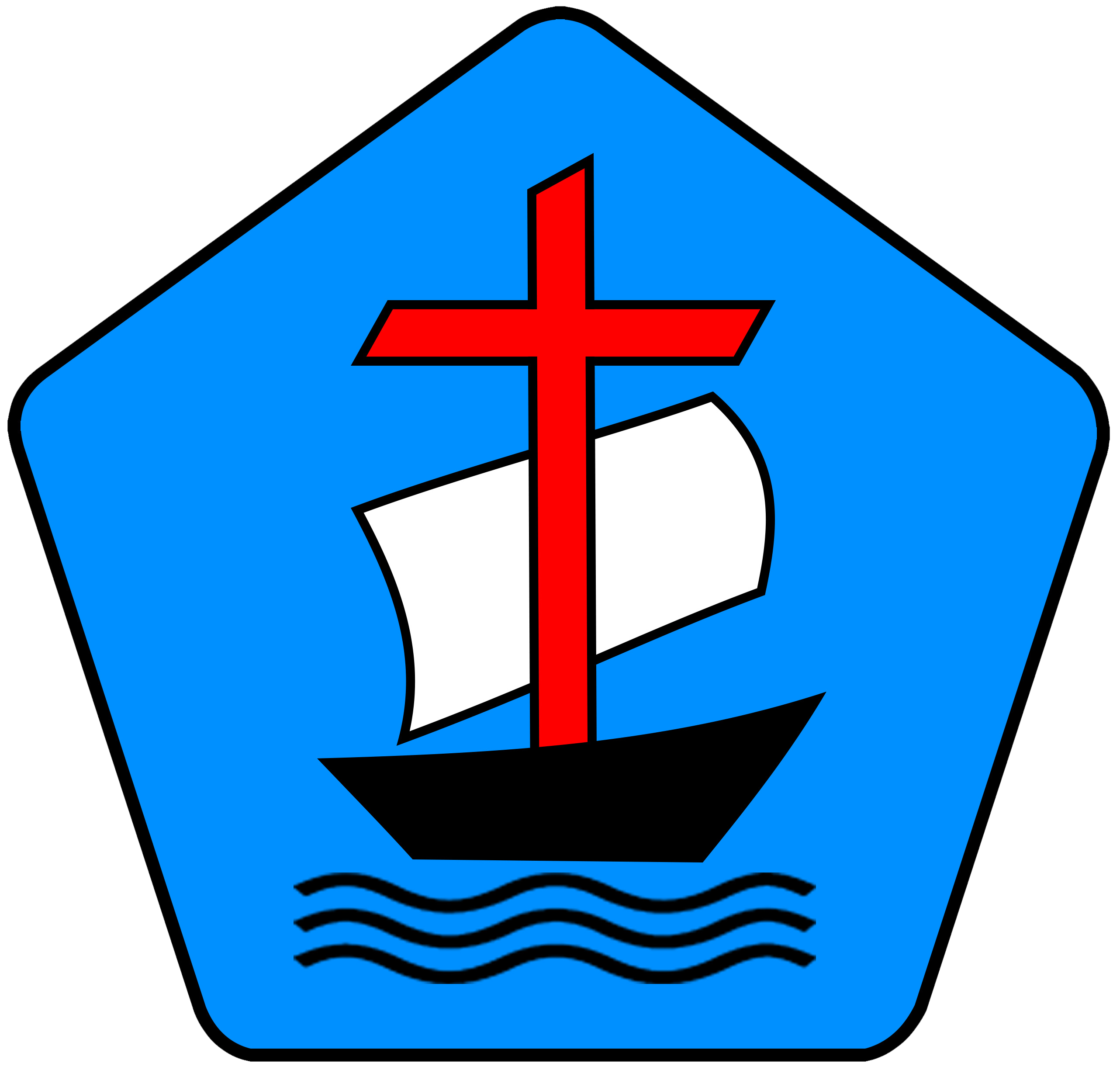
Logo of the Mennonite Church

Javanese Mennonite Church (Indonesian: injili di Tanah Jawa) is one of three Mennonite-related church synods in Indonesia.

== Location ==
Its member congregations are concentrated in the Mount Muria area along the coast of north Central Java in Indonesia, although there are congregations in a few other cities like Semarang, Salatiga and Yoyakarta and the provinces of Lampung and South Sumatra. The Muria area juts into the Java Sea east of Semarang, the capital of Central Java, and is dominated by Mount Muria, an ancient, now extinct volcano. GITJ is a member of PGI (Persekutuan Gereja-gereeja di Indonesia, the Fellowship of Christian Churches of Indonesia. It is also member of the Mennonite World Conference (MWC) and Asian Mennonite Conference (AMC).

== Origins ==
Three streams of church life flow together in the life of GITJ. The first of these is the influence of the Dutch Mennonite Mission (Doopsgezinde Zendingsvereeniging) formed in the Netherlands in 1847, which sent its first missionaries, Pieter and Wilhelmina Jansz, to Java in 1851. The first Mennonite mission congregation in the Dutch East Indies (today Indonesia) was formed in the coastal town of Jepara at the western foot of Mount Muria when the first believers there were baptized in 1854 by Pieter Jansz. Pasrah Karso became an important early Javanese leader of this church first in Pulojati and then leading a group in the formation of the Kedungpenjalin Congregation.

The second stream is represented by a Reformed congregation begun in Kayuapu at the southern foot of Mount Muria under the leadership missionary Hoezoo of Dutch Missionary Fellowship (NZG--Nederlandsche Zendelingensgezellschaft). Pasrah Noeriman became an important Javanese leader in the Kayuapu Congregation. Forty-five years later this congregation was turned over to the care of the Dutch Mennonite Mission.

The third stream is a large, powerful indigenous Javanese Christian movement under the leadership of Ibrahim Tunggul Wulung. Tunggul Wulung was a scion of the royal family of Solo in Central Java who became a hermit mystic on Mount Kelut in East Java. From there, through an interesting series of events he became a Christian believer who identified himself as a Kristen Jowo (Javanese Christian) who sought to retain Javanese language, culture and folkways, in contrast to the so-called Kristen Londo (Dutch Christian), converts to Christianity who tended to adopt European ways. This indigenous movement grew far more rapidly than the Christian groups begun by European missionaries.

Eventually, by the turn of the twentieth century, all three of these streams were united into one family of congregations under the leadership and care of the Dutch Mennonite Mission with missionaries from Netherlands, Russia, and later Germany and Switzerland. Soon after the outbreak of World War II the German forces invaded and occupied Netherlands. The response of the government of the Netherlands East Indies was to arrest German nationals there, including the two German Mennonite missionaries with the Dutch Mennonite Mission in Java. The remaining Dutch and Swiss missionaries determined that it was time to organize the churches that had developed by that time into an independent synod with the Javanese language name Patoenggilanipoen Para Pasamoean Kristen Tata Injil ing Wengkon Pati, Koedoes lan Jepara (literally, Union of Gospel Pattern Christian Congregations in the regions of Pati, Kudus and Jepara), which was done on May 30, 1940. The thirteen or so congregations that were members of this new synod at that time consisted of more than 4000 baptized members. The mission also had two hospitals, a leprosarium and many schools. The Japanese occupation (1942-45) brought with it terrible suffering for the people of this Javanese Mennonite Synod. The late forties, the period of the Indonesian struggle for freedom from Dutch colonial rule, brought more suffering and hardship.

== Recent activity ==
Free Indonesia provided opportunity for the churches to develop and grow, though not without struggle. Eventually, with renewed help from Europeans and now also North Americans sent by Mennonite Central Committee they were able to resurrect one of the mission hospitals and reopen many schools and start others, including one, and later a second, theological school in Pati. The church grew very rapidly, though in a predominantly Islamic context. In the nineties the synod suffered from a schism, which after several years was healed. Now the GITJ Synod consists of 100 mature congregations, many congregations in formation and some 40,000 baptized members.

== See also ==
- Muria Christian Church in Indonesia
- Religion in Indonesia
