= Jan Jansz. de Stomme =

Dutch portrait painter (c. 1615 – c. 1658)

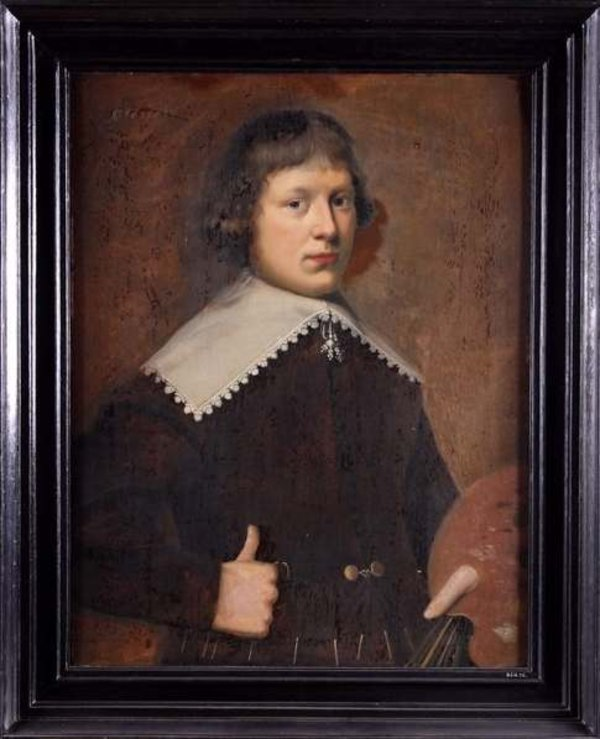
- Self-portrait, 1634, aged nineteen
- Born: c. 1615; Franeker, Friesland, Netherlands
- Died: c. 1658; Groningen, Netherlands

Signature
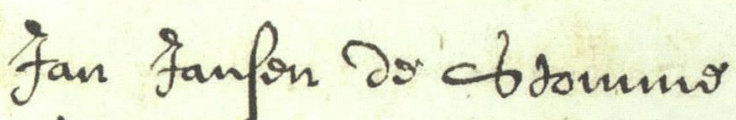

Jan Jansz. de Stomme (c. 1615 – c. –1658), (Note: "Jansz" is an abbreviated form of the Dutch patronymic "Janszoon", meaning "son of Jan".) was Dutch Golden Age painter of portraits. He was born deaf and mute, and used the nickname "De Stomme" ('the Mute'). His father was a baker also named Jan Jansz. who had served as burgemeester of his native town of Franeker. On his father's death in 1628, De Stomme was orphaned: he came under the guardianship of a lawyer, Dirk Vogelzang, and subsequently spent time in the town of Leeuwarden, where he is believed to have been taught to paint by Wybrand de Geest. He may also have been a pupil of the Leeuwarden painter Harmen Willemsz, and – according to a later, and possibly apocryphal, family tradition – of Rembrandt.

In 1643, De Stomme moved to Groningen, where he became a successful portrait painter. He painted around forty-five known works, and was particularly known for portraits of the local aristocracy. His first fiancée died in 1649 around a year after their engagement, possibly in childbirth. He remarried in 1650 and had two daughters. Anton Deusing, a German physician and mathematician, reported in 1656 that De Stomme used sign language to discuss theology with his wife and a servant; the veracity of this story has been questioned, though another comment exists from Samuel Maresius, a French theologian who sat for a portrait by De Stomme, that he was able to use signs to express his Calvinist religious faith. De Stomme died in 1657 or early 1658; his wife and the younger of their two daughters died around the same time.

== Biography ==
Jan Jansz. de Stomme was born in Franeker in the Dutch province of Friesland around 1615. (Note: His birth date is adduced from two self-portraits listing his age as nineteen in 1634; the baptismal records of Franeker from before 1649 have been lost.) He was the son of Jan Jansz., a baker who served as burgemeester of Franeker in 1620–1622 and 1627–1628, and of Pytke Bouwkedr. His paternal uncle may have been the painter Willem Jansz. In 1628, De Stomme and his elder sister, Catrina, were orphaned: the two were cared for by a lawyer, Dirk Vogelzang. Catrina adopted the name Vogelzang from Dirk, but that De Stomme refused to do so. The name "De Stomme" ('the Mute') is a nickname, by which De Stomme, who was both deaf and mute, chose to be known; he is recorded as using it from 1643.

De Stomme may have learned to paint from Harmen Willemsz., a resident of Leeuwarden; the art historian Ben Broos considers a 1634 painting by Willemsz to depict De Stomme, whose age is given as twenty. He is considered on stylistic grounds to have been the pupil of Wybrand de Geest, a Friesland portrait painter. According to an account written by his descendant, the draughtsman and jeweller Frans der Kinderen, in 1724–1729, he was also a pupil of Rembrandt. Kaminska considers this likely to be a posthumous invention to increase the value of his works, and perhaps to demonstrate his ability to achieve success despite his disability. If he ever was apprenticed to Rembrandt, she judges that the latter had minimal effect on his style, and that any apprenticeship can only have lasted a matter of months. If he did spend time with Rembrandt, it was probably in the autumn of 1634. He painted two self-portraits, probably during his apprenticeship, in 1634 and 1635.

De Stomme requested official permission to move to the city of Groningen on 17 June 1643. From this time on he worked actively as a painter. He settled in Groningen permanently and became a citizen, though continued to do business in Leeuwarden, where he is mentioned as a debtor in a legal document of 1644. He was a member of the Calvinist Reformed Church; Kaminska suggests that a "Ian Ians." recorded as joining the Reformed Church in Franeker on 22 July 1643 may have been De Stomme. On 19 August 1648 he was engaged to Catharina Solingius in Groningen; it is unknown when they married. Catharina died, probably in or after childbirth, in late 1649. (Note: The suggestion is made by Kaminska on the basis that items for a baby were included in the inventory of the couple's property made after her death.)

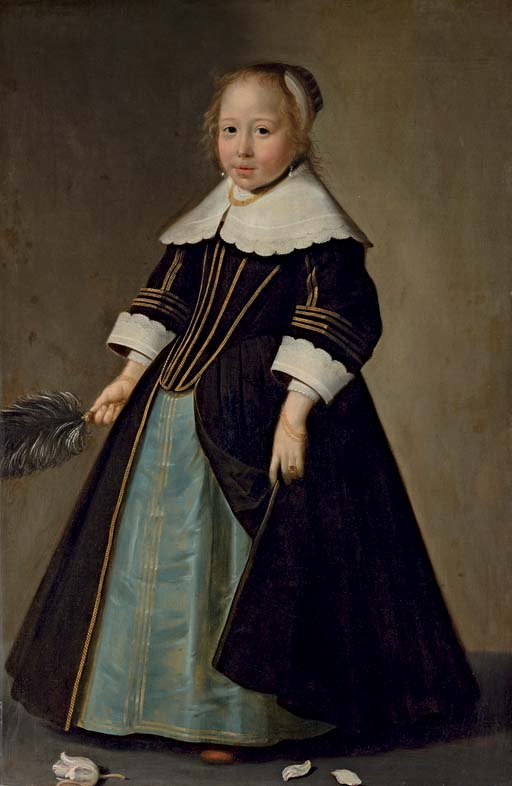
Portrait of a girl, c. 1650

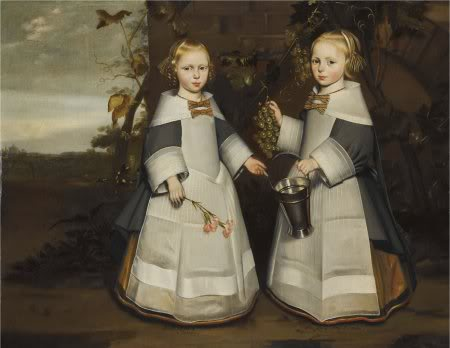
Two Girls from Groningen, 1654

Two paintings, formerly attributed to De Stomme, now considered of uncertain attribution

De Stomme remarried on 18 May 1650, to Aeltijen Stevens. They had two daughters: Petertien, born on 28 June 1653, and Jantjen, born on 22 June 1655. By his later life he became successful; the art historian David De Witt describes him as having "dominated portraiture in Groningen". He was known for his portraits of the aristocracy, and lived on the exclusive Herestraat. Around forty-five of his paintings are known. He died in 1657 or early in 1658; his wife, Aeltijen, and his younger daughter Jantjen died around the same time. Pietertien, the surviving daughter, was taken in by a maternal relative, Jan Stevens, in 1658.

Anton Deusing, a physician and mathematician who was a professor at Groningen's university, described De Stomme as "the most talented painter" of Groningen in a work of 1656. He reports that De Stomme used sign language to discuss theology with his wife and a servant; Kaminska considers this likely apocryphal, and that the sign languages available in the seventeenth-century Netherlands would not have been complex enough for the task. In 1673, the French theologian Samuel Maresius, who sat for a painting by De Stomme in 1653, wrote of a painter from Groningen who was deaf and mute, but "able to give the account of his faith through signs": Kaminska considers this certainly a reference to De Stomme.

== Gallery ==
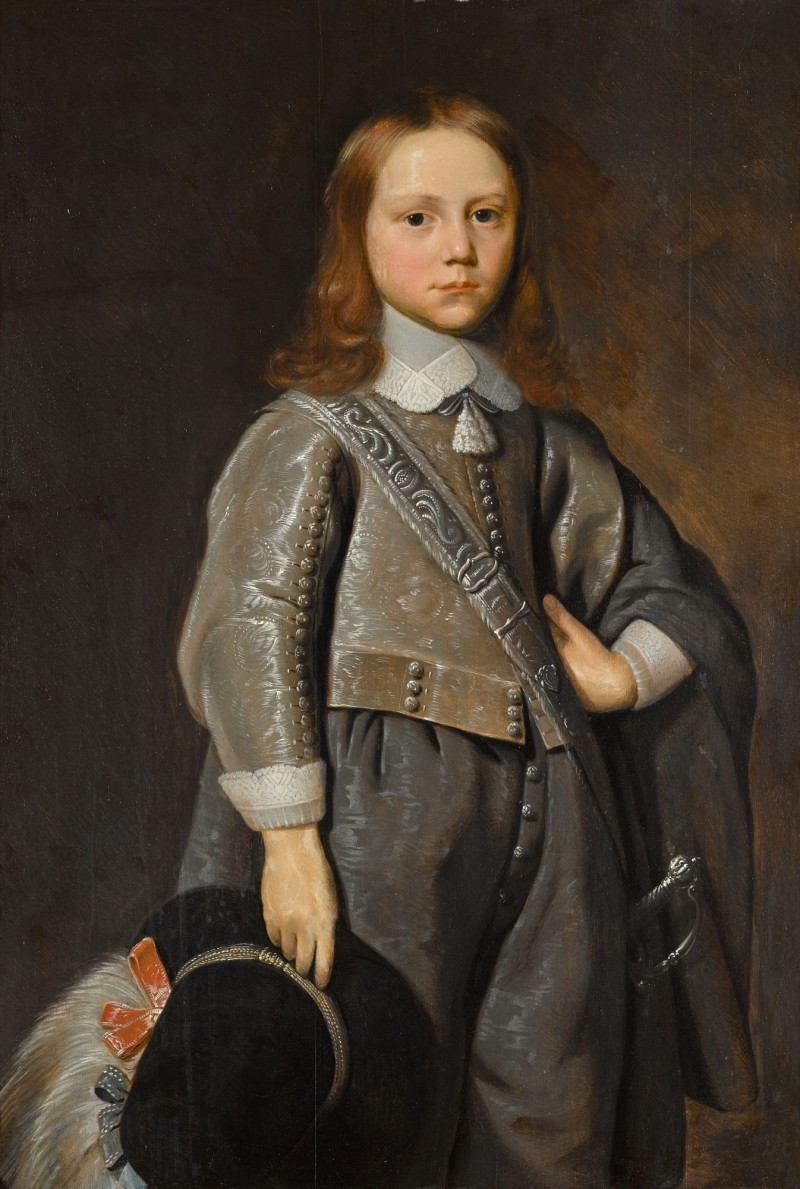
Portrait of a boy, 1648

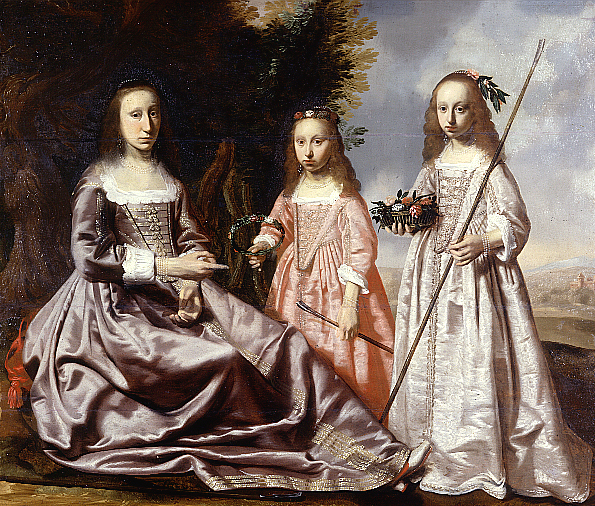
Family portrait of Bouwina Coenders van Helpen and her two daughters, c. 1648

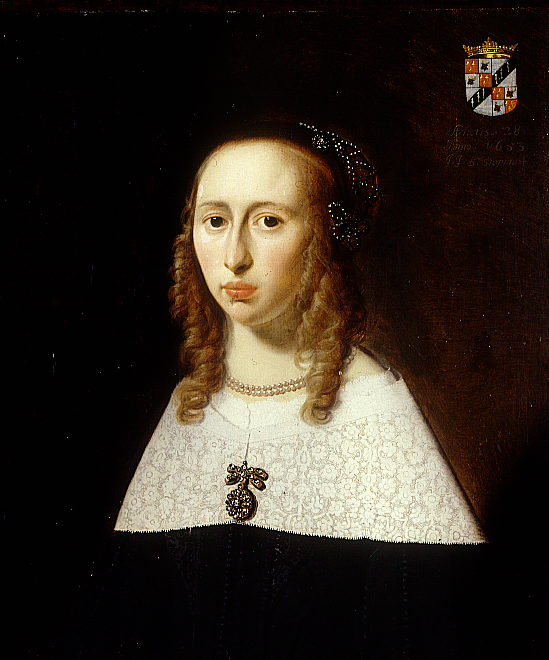
Portrait of Elisabeth Hooftman van Godlinze gezegd Eyckelenberg, 1653

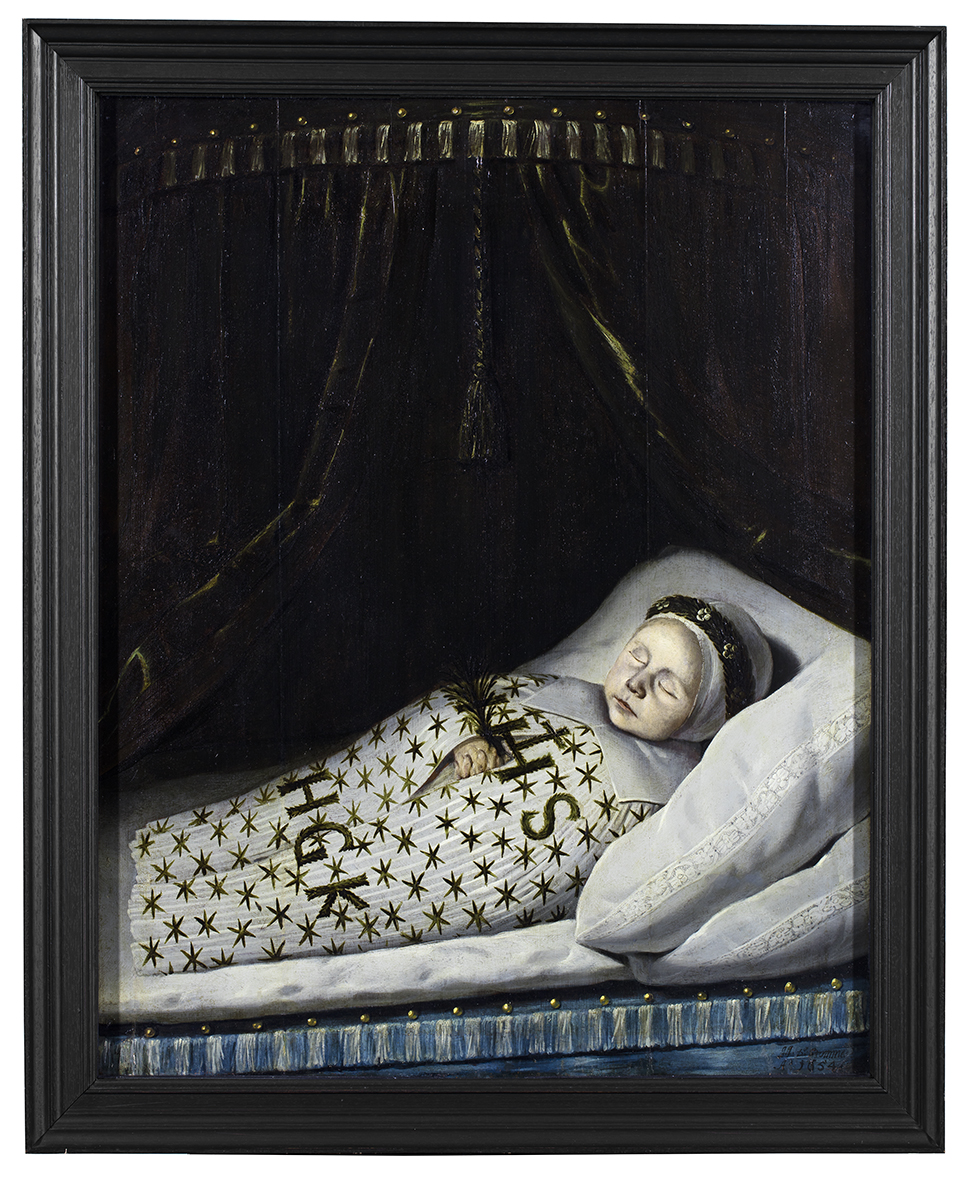
Portrait of an Unknown Dead Child, 1654

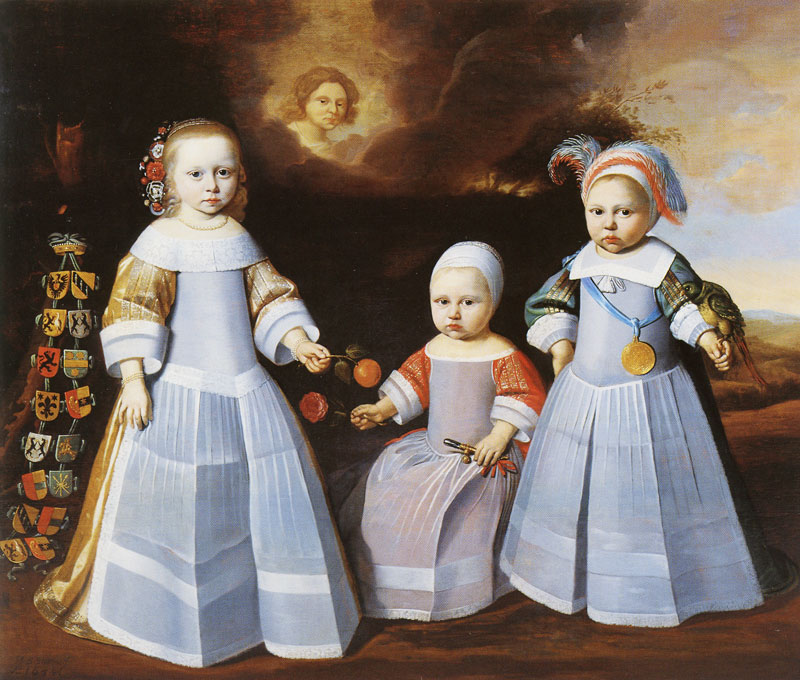
Portrait of Frederika, Edzard Jacob and Lambert Tjarda van Starkenborgh, 1654

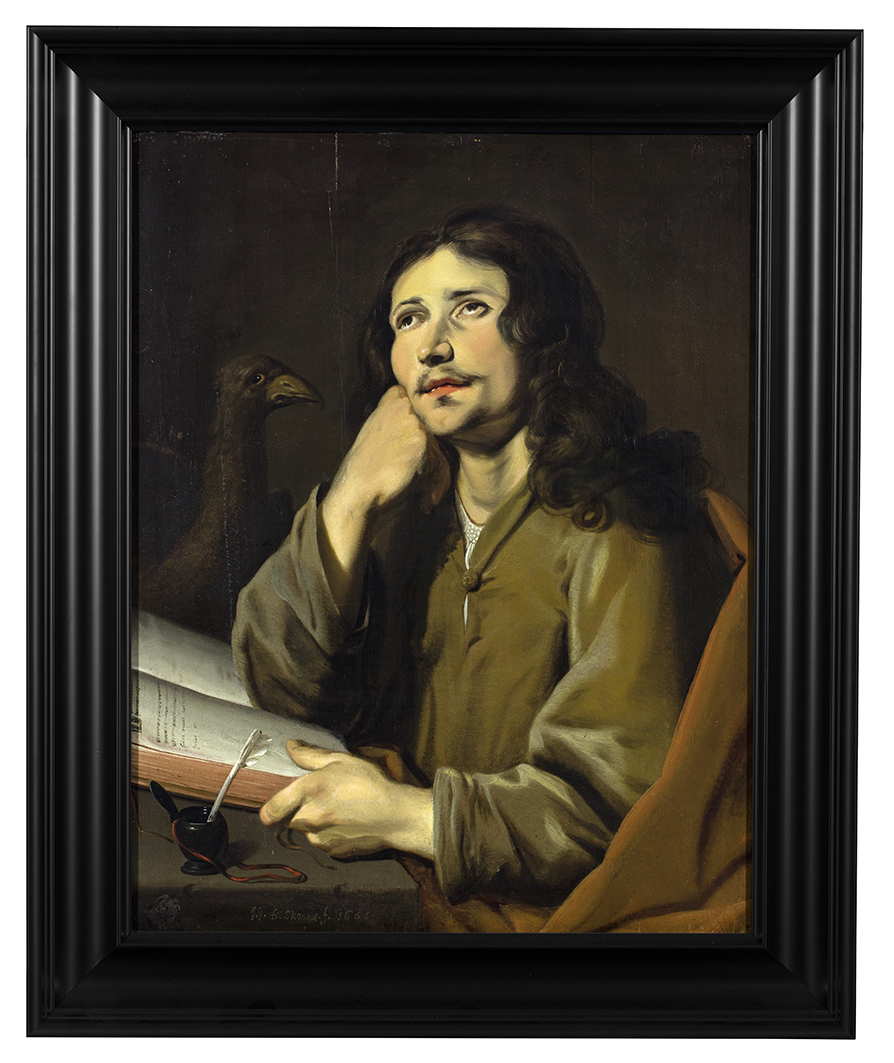
John the Evangelist, 1655

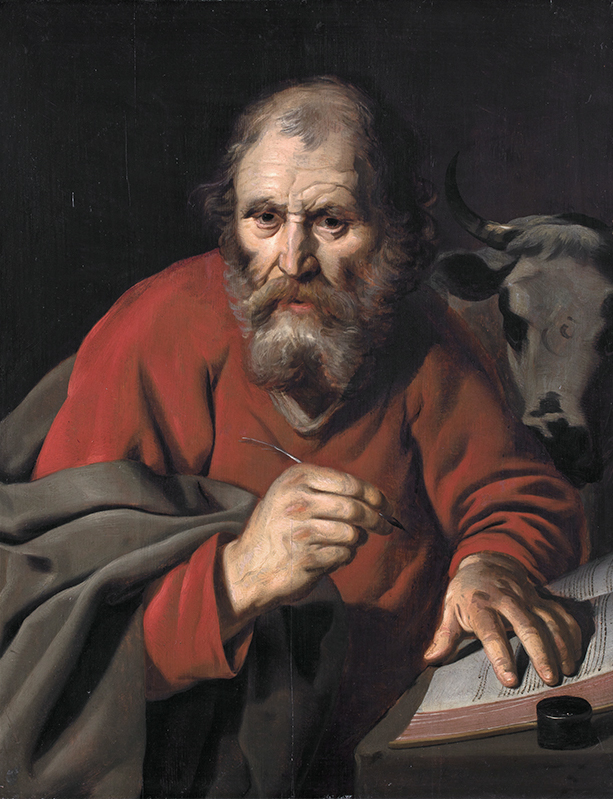
Luke the Evangelist, 1655

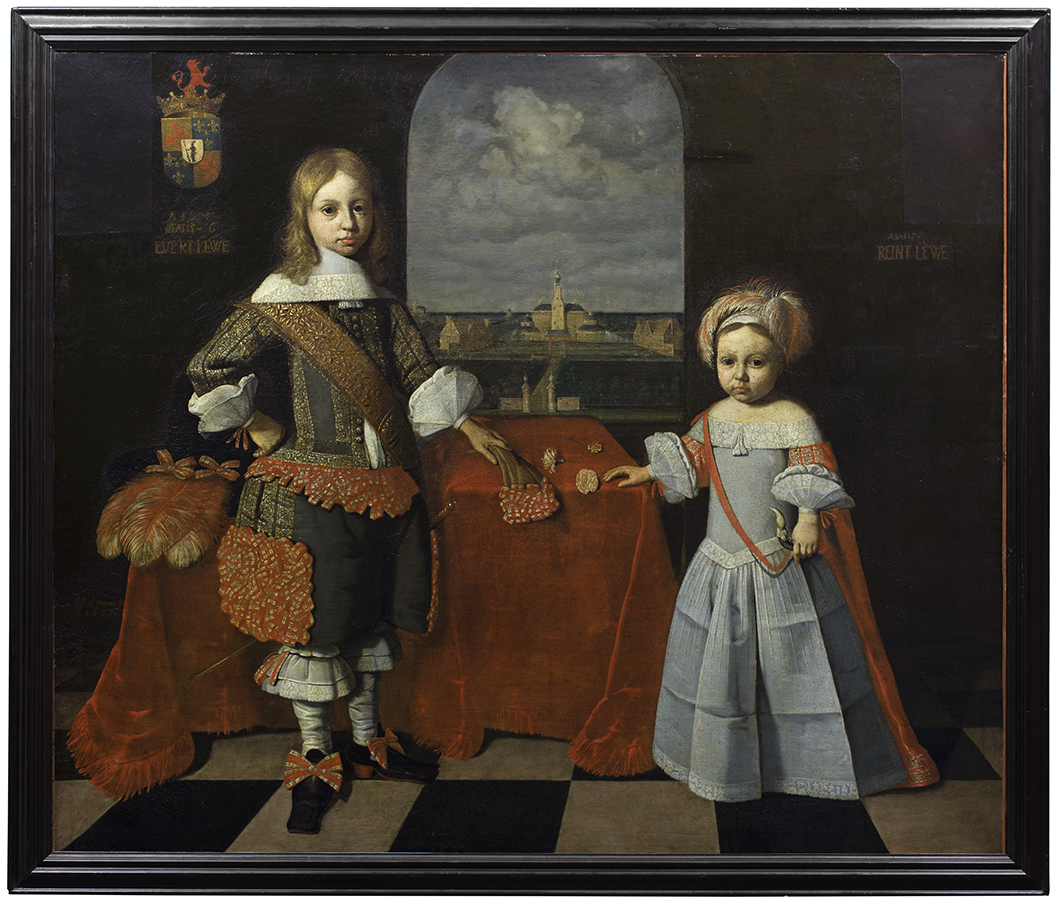
Evert and Reint Lewe, 1657

== Works cited ==
- Bergsma, Wiebe, ed. (2012). Enege gedenckwerdege geschiedenissen: kroniek van de Friese militair Poppo van Burmania uit de Tachtigjarige Oorlog [Enege gedenckwerdege geschiedenissen: Chronicle of the Frisian soldier Poppo van Burmania from the Eighty Years' War] (in Dutch). Hilversum: Verloren. ISBN 978-90-8704-304-9.
- Blankert, Albert (2004). Selected Writings on Dutch Painting: Rembrandt, Van Beke, Vermeer, and Others. Zwolle: Waanders. ISBN 90-400-8932-9.
- Broos, Ben (2015). "Een vergeten leerling van Rembrandt: Jan Jansz. de Stomme" [A Forgotten Student of Rembrandt: Jan Jansz. de Stomme]. Oud Holland (in Dutch). 128 (2/3): 125–138. JSTOR 24766222.
- Dekker, Jeroen J. H. (2025). Children’s Emotions in Europe, 1500–1900: A Visual History. London: Bloomsbury Academic. ISBN 978-1-350-19868-5.
- De Witt, David (2008). The Bader Collection: Dutch and Flemish Paintings. Kingston, Ontario: Agnes Etherington Art Centre. ISBN 978-1-55339-094-7.
- Kaminska, Barbara A. (2021). Images of Miraculous Healing in the Early Modern Netherlands. Leiden: Brill. ISBN 978-90-04-47242-6.
- Kaminska, Barbara A. (2024). "Prelingual Deafness and the Manualist/Oralist Controversy in the Dutch Republic: The Case of the Groningen Painter Jan Jansz. de Stomme". Early Modern Low Countries. 8 (1): 1–24 – via ResearchGate.
