= Pieter Jansz =

Pieter Jansz with his assistant in translating the Bible into the Javanese language

Pieter Jansz (September 25, 1820 - June 6, 1904) was the first Dutch Mennonite missionary in Indonesia. He arrived in Central Java in 1851 and began his missionary work. He encountered constraining influences from Islam throughout the area, recognizing the lack of religious freedom to become a Christian. He felt compelled to search for new methods in order to evangelize; in which he developed a theory that Christians should be evangelized in colonies, as a solution. He was also known for his ability to translate the Bible into various languages which allowed the Javanese people to have access to the Bible.

== Education ==
Pieter Jansz was born in Amsterdam on September 25, 1820. His theology was Protestant orthodoxy with a bias toward Pietist expressions. Within a three-month period in 1848, he lost both his father and his newlywed wife, Johanna Elisabeth van Ijzendoorn, through death. These tragedies affected him deeply and caused him to contemplate his future. As a result, he applied as a missionary candidate to the Doopsgezinde Zendungs-Vereeniging or the Dutch Mennonite Missionary Society (DMMS). He later got remarried, to Jacoba Wilhelmina Frederica Schmilau (1830–1909) and they had ten children, of whom their son Pieter A. Jansz was a successor of his father in the missions field. Jansz was an elementary school teacher in Delft. During his years of teaching he published textbooks and didactic stories for children. In preparation for his missionary assignment Jansz received private tutoring at the Royal Academy of Delft in order to become acquainted with the Javanese and Malayan languages, as well as with the geography and ethnology of the Dutch Indies. The last years of his life (1902–1904) he spent at Kaju-Apu, at the home of his son-in-law, missionary Johann Fast, where he died 6 June 1904.

== Missionary work ==
August 1851 Pieter Jansz and his wife Jacoba Wilhelmina Frederica Schmilau sailed to Jakarta to begin their missionary work. On November 15 they arrived as the first Mennonite missionaries of the Enlightenment period. Upon their arrival Jansz primary focus was to find an opening for a teacher rather than a missionary. As a teacher he would not be limited by the regulations the Dutch Indies government imposed on missionaries, especially in Java. Also the DMMS was convinced that education was the best way to raise the cultural and moral level of the native population and to make them receptive to the gospel. He worked as a private tutor on the property of Margar whom built a house for Jansz, in Japara, Margar Soekias(ian) was a land owner. who was a Christian patrician of Armenian background. Jansz and Soekias(ian) began to collide because of a disagreement about promises on the subject of sugar and rice(so it sayes in the diary of Jansz), and Jansz was forced to leave. Later on he opened a school for the Javanese children but had very little success in evangelizing because he had no help; this resulted in him leaving the school and becoming a full-time missionary.

On April 16, 1854 he had succeeded in baptizing five Javanese people which started the first congregation of the native population in the area of Jepara. They joined a European congregation that already existed in Jepara, to become the Javanese Mennonite Church, which then formed part of the Protestant church in the Dutch Indies. Jansz's congregation grew slowly for two specific reasons: he was a very strong believer of coming to faith before baptism, and he pushed believers to become baptized. The second reason for the slow growth is because the area in which Jansz was working had a strong Islamic influence which continues to this day. Because there was a slowness of growth within the church, he wanted to adopt new methods. In doing so he wrote a book called Land Reclamation and Evangelism in Java in which he emphasized Christian communities or colonies where converts could find support and protection. Jansz strongly believed that evangelism had to be performed by the Javanese Christians because he was a Westerner who simply could not bridge the gap between himself and the villagers.

== Colonial government ==
The colonial government allocated the Mount Muria area in the Northern part of Java, to the Mennonite missionary organization. Jansz refused to ask legal permission to work as a missionary because he wanted to obey a higher authority than the colonial government. Jansz unwillingly was a subject under the Article 123 of the government regulations to the Dutch Indies, which gave the authorities certain control over the missionaries. Jansz faced much turmoil over Article 123, and in 1860 the Governor General withdrew his admission as a missionary, permitting him to stay in the country only if he remained as a teacher. The DMMS made changes within their organization; and without formal discussion the Mennonite missionaries decided to follow the lead of other mission boards in making use of the financial and legal facilities offered by the colonial government to lease large parcels of land and to build and maintain schools and hospitals.

== Bible translation ==
Jansz knew that in order to facilitate a church service and catechism, he needed to translate parts of the Bible into the Javanese language. More specifically he put the Psalms into verse using the Javanese tone scale tembung. Jansz resigned from his work as a missionary due to poor health in 1881, at which time his son Pieter A. Jansz took over his father's work. Jansz began his work with the British and Foreign Bible Society; in 1888 he published the New Testament in Javanese, and in 1892 the Old Testament. In 1895 he published the second edition of the whole Bible, as well as a Javanese dictionary in two volumes, with the titles Practisch Nederlandsch-Javaansch Woordenboek and Practisch Javaansch - Nederlandsch Woordenboek, both published at The Hague. These literary efforts won him the distinction of a Knight of the Order of the Dutch Lion.
