= Johannes Jansz. van Bronckhorst =

Dutch Golden Age painter

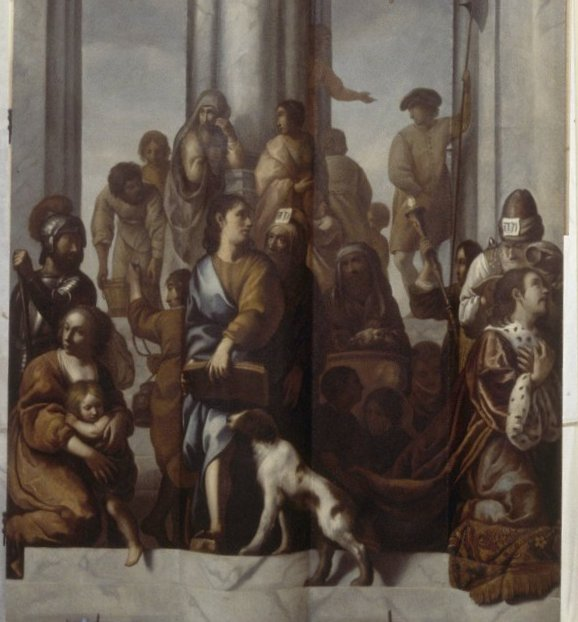
Detail of organ shutter painted in 1655, from photo taken at time of restoration, Nieuwe Kerk, Amsterdam

Johannes Jansz van Bronckhorst (1627 – 1656), was a Dutch Golden Age painter who died young.

== Biography ==
He was born in Utrecht and was a pupil of Jan Gerritsz van Bronckhorst. He travelled to Rome, and became a member of Bentvueghels (nickname unknown). In Rome, he became friends with the poet Reyer Anslo, whose portrait he painted. He died in Amsterdam.
