= Muria Christian Church in Indonesia =

Group of Christian Pentecostal churches headquartered in Kudus, Indonesia

Muria Christian Church in Indonesia Gereja Kristen Muria Indonesia
- Abbreviation: GKMI
- Classification: Protestant
- Orientation: Mennonites
- Polity: Congregational Synodal
- Chairman: Pdt. Dr. Agus Wahyuning Mayanto, S.si. Teol
- Region: Indonesia
- Founder: Tee Siem Tat
- Origin: 6 December 1920; Kudus, Central Java
- Official website: sinodegkmi.com

Muria Christian Church in Indonesia (also known as the Muria Mennonite Christian Church in Indonesia or GKMI which stands for Gereja Kristen Muria Indonesia in Indonesian ) is one of three Indonesian church synods which are members of Mennonite World Conference (MWC). The church reports more than 16,000 members living in Java, Bali, Sumatra and Kalimantan.

GKMI started as an indigenous Christian movement begun by a Chinese Indonesian couple by the name Tee Siem Tat and Sie Djoen Nio in the city of Kudus in north Central Java before 1920. The group identified with the Mennonite family of churches when the first believers sought baptism from Russian Mennonite missionaries working under the Dutch Mennonite Mission (Doopsgezinde Zendingsvereeniging) in the Muria area in December 1920. This group organized itself in 1925 using the Dutch language name Chineesche Doopsgezinde Christengemeente (Chinese Mennonite Congregation) and was recognized by the government of the Dutch East Indies in 1927.

By the 1940s a half dozen congregations had been formed incorporating also groups of Chinese Indonesian believers who had come to faith through the ministries of the Mennonite missionaries working mostly among the Javanese population in the area. They sometimes also used the Chinese name Tiong Hwa Kie Tok Kau Hwe (Chinese Christian Church). They organized themselves into a synod called Khu Hwee Muria in 1948. By 1958 they changed the name of the synod to Persatuan Gereja-Gereja Kristen Muria Indonesia (Union of Muria Christian Churches of Indonesia). The GKMI sprang up in Chinese Indonesian communities in the towns surrounding Mount Muria, an ancient volcano along the north coast of in Central Java. Since 1960 it has spread beyond the Muria area and into other ethnic groups on the four main islands of western Indonesia.

== See also ==
- Javanese Mennonite Church
