= Albert Jansz. Klomp =

Dutch Golden Age painter

- Born: Baptized 11 March 1625; Amsterdam
- Died: 20 December 1688; Amsterdam
- Known for: Pastoral Landscape Painting

Signature
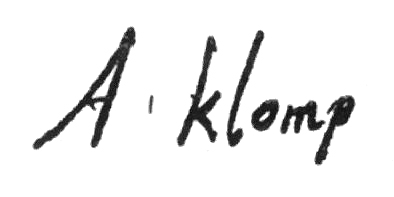

Albert Jansz. Klomp or Albert Klomp (Amsterdam, Baptized 11 March 1625 - earliest 20 December 1688) was a Dutch Golden Age painter, who specialized in painting rural landscapes with animals.

Klomp's typical pastoral landscape paintings can be seen in museums such as the Rijksmuseum, the Fitzwilliam Museum, and The Metropolitan Museum of Art. Klomp's work is reminiscent of that of Paulus Potter. Although it is not certain that they worked together, the two artists share similar subjects and style, and Klomp's work has been wrongly attributed to Potter in the past.

== Gallery ==
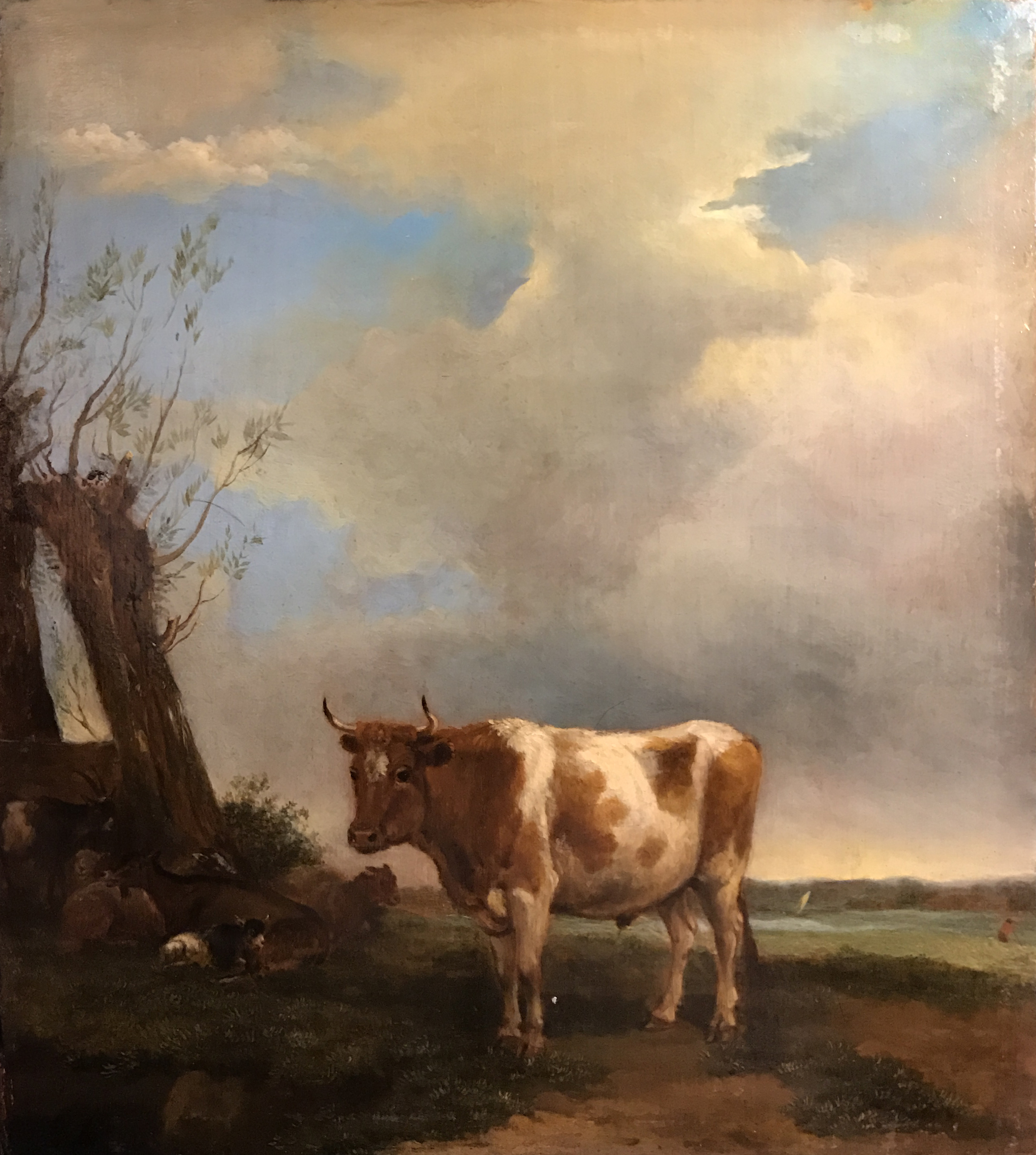
A Bull in a Meadow with Goats by a Tree

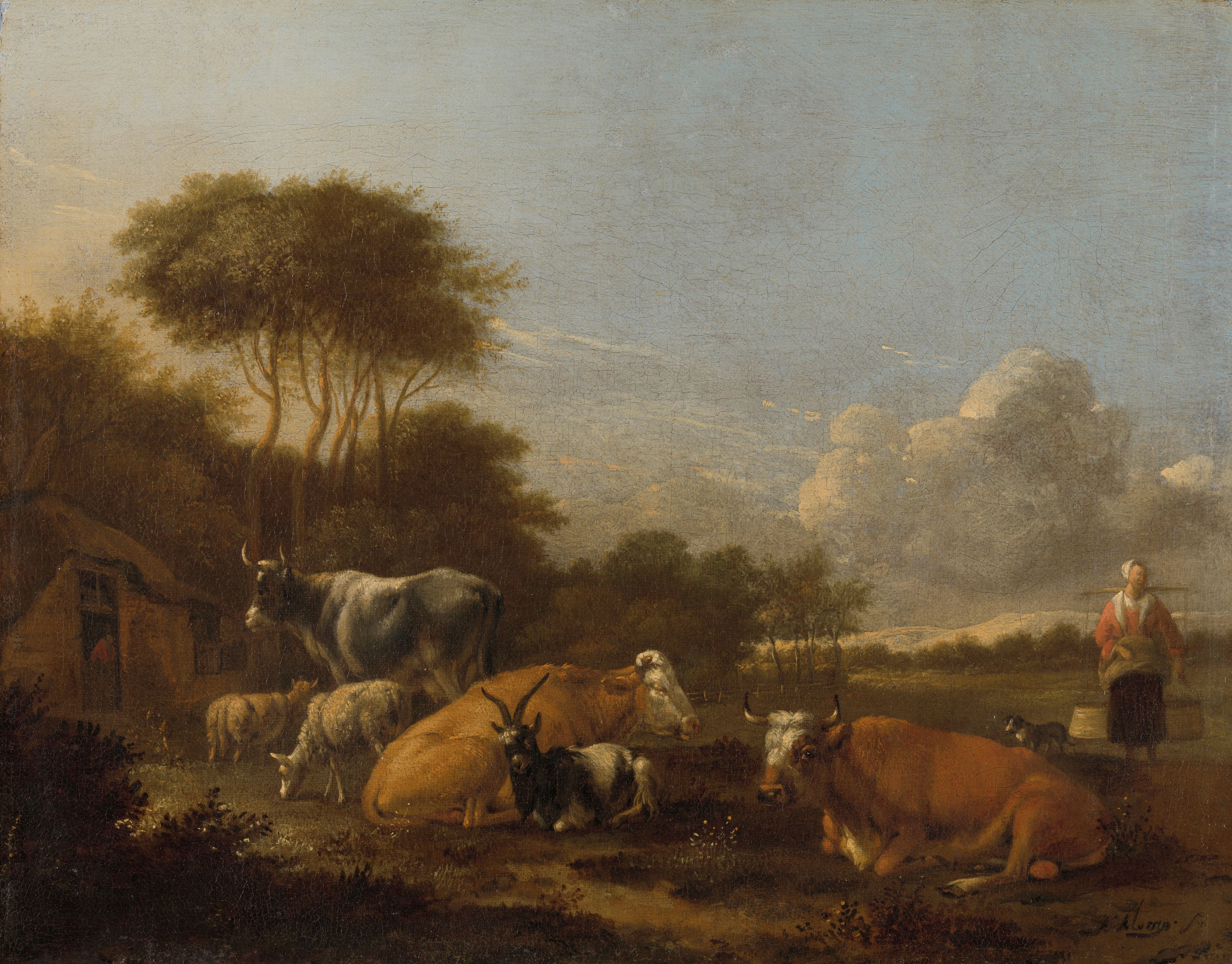
Landscape with Cattle

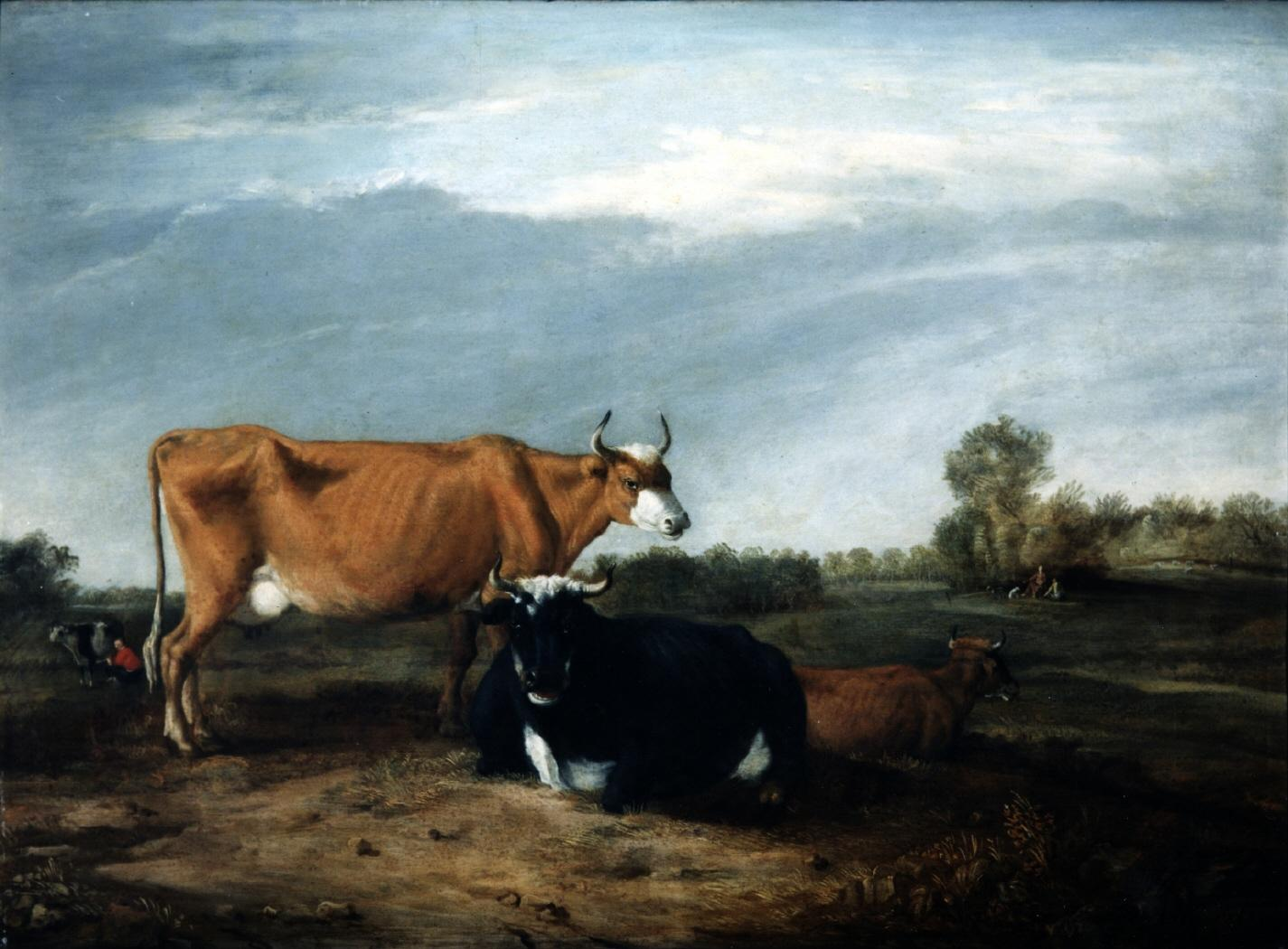
Landscape with Cattle

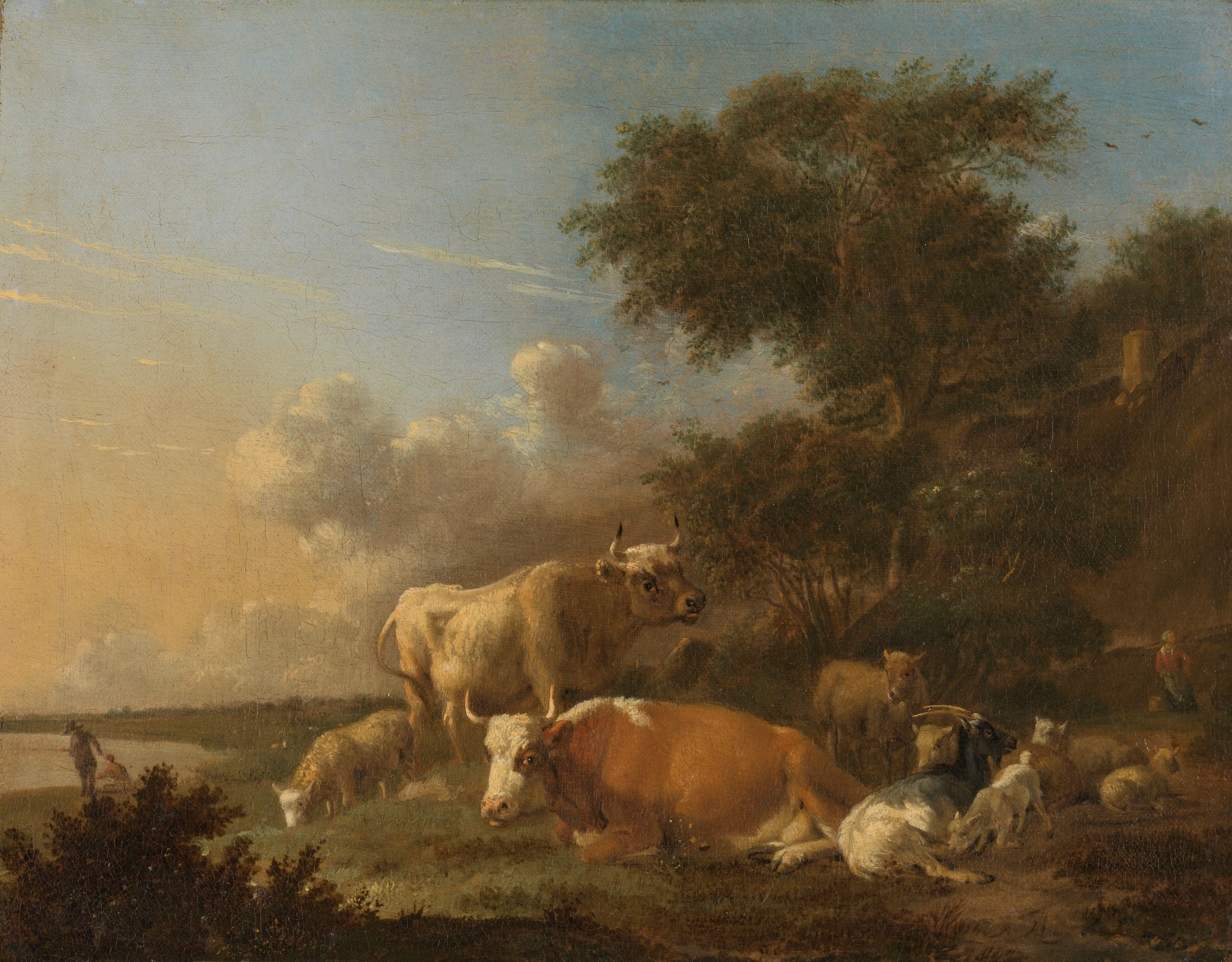
Landscape with Cattle
