= Anton Deusing =

German physician (1612–1666)

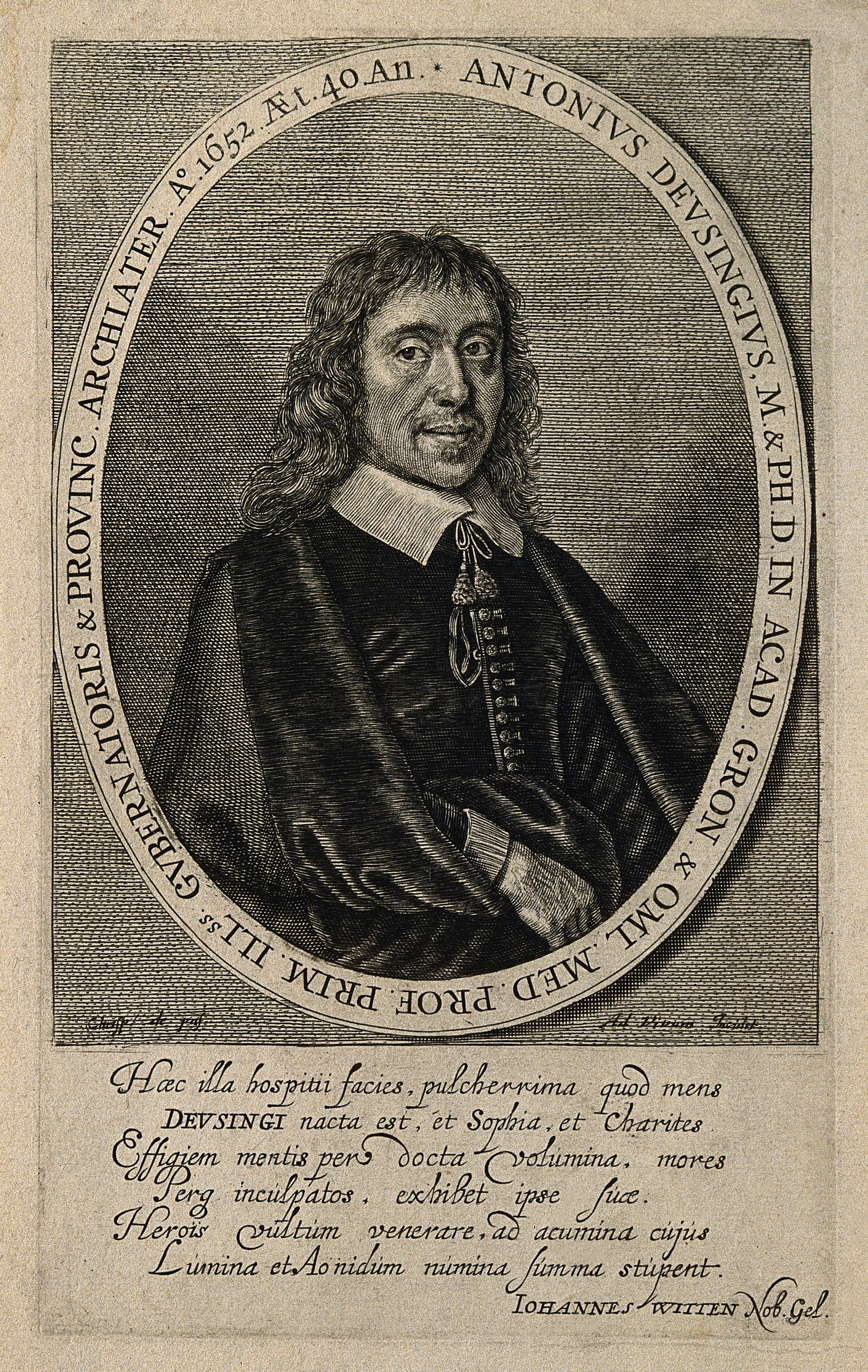
Antonius Deusing

Anton Deusing, in Latin Antonius Deusingius (October 15, 1612 – January 30, 1666) was a German physician, mathematician, and astronomer.

== Life ==
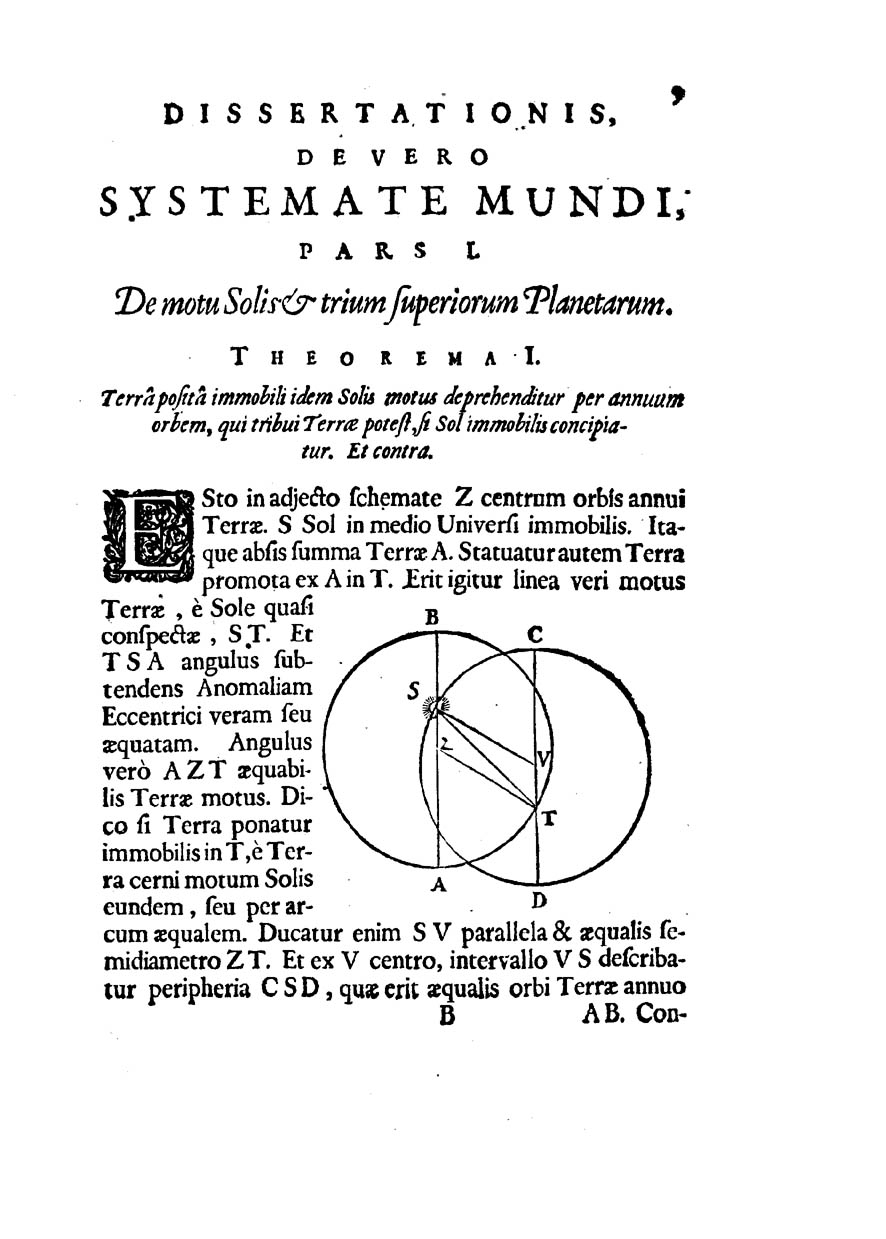
De vero systemate mundi dissertatio mathematica, 1643

Born in Moers in 1612, Deusing was an educated German physician, scholar of Oriental language, philosophy, physics, mathematics and astronomy. Between 1630 and 1637 he was enrolled at the University of Leiden, where he became a protégé of Jacobus Golius, the famous professor of Oriental Languages and Mathematics. In 1646 he became the first professor of medicine at the University of Groningen. He wrote and published several works in Latin. He died in Groningen in 1666.

== Works ==
- De vero systemate mundi dissertatio mathematica (in Latin). Amstelodami: Lowijs Elzevier. 1643.
- The Universal Theatre of Nature (1645)
- Synopsis of Medicine (1649)
- The Economy of the Animal System (1660)
- Disquisitio physico-mathematica gemina, de vacuo itemque de attractione quibus probatur, nullum in rerum natura dari, vel posse dari vacuum (in Latin). Amstelodami: Pieter van den Berge. 1661.
- Disquisitio physico-mathematica gemina, de vacuo itemque de attractione quibus probatur, nullum in rerum natura dari, vel posse dari vacuum (in Latin). Amsterdam: Pieter van den Berge. 1662.
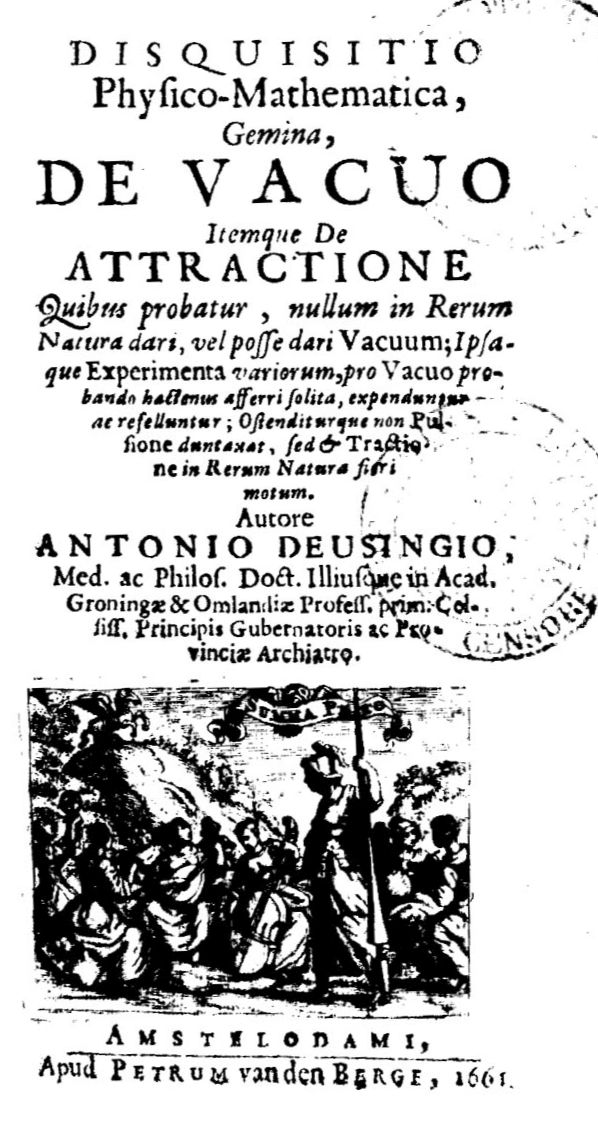
Disquisitio physico-mathematica gemina, de vacuo itemque de attractione quibus probatur, nullum in rerum natura dari, vel posse dari vacuum, 1662
