= Potestaat of Friesland =

Legendary leader of medieval Frisia

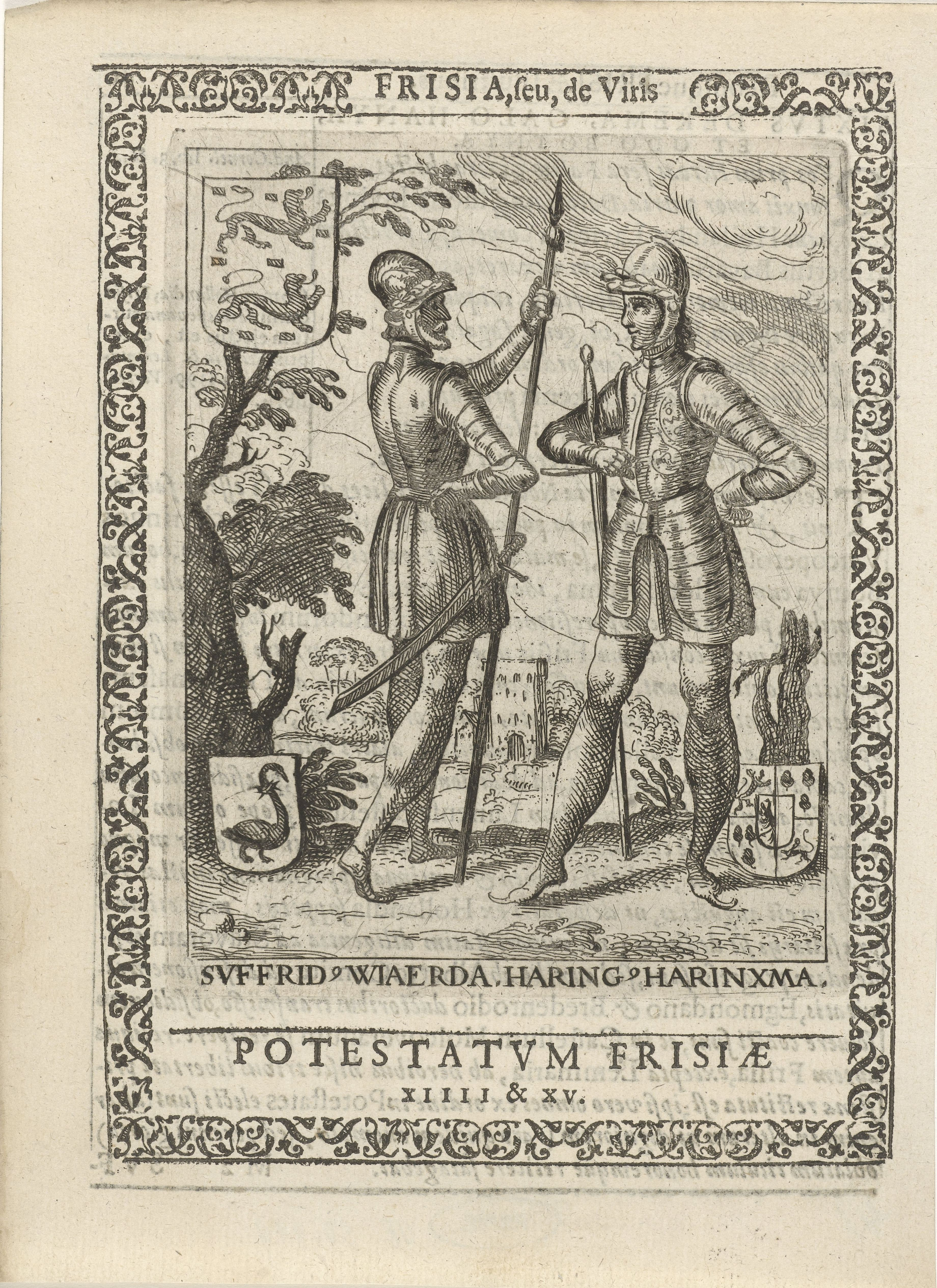
Sjoerd Wiarda and Haring Harinxma, two consecutively-serving potestaten

Potestaat (West Frisian pronunciation: [poːtəsˈtaːt]; pl. potestaten) was the title of a supposed governor of medieval Friesland. According to the legendary Karelsprivilege, a 14th-century forgery, Charlemagne had first granted the title of potestaat to Magnus Forteman. He and most of his early successors were entirely fictional, invented later by pseudohistorians in order to argue in favour of the notion of Frisian freedom. The title potestaat does not appear in historical documents until 1470. It became popular after 1578, when the idea of the inherited office of potentate was linked to the new office of stadtholder, which was held by the House of Nassau-Dietz.

In 1851, Wopke Eekhoff compiled the following list in Beknopte Geschiedenis van Friesland ('A Brief History of Friesland'). However, most of the list is fictitious, except for the last name, though constructed from names of leading 16th-century noblemen and their supposed ancestors.

- Magnus Forteman, fl. 809 (first recipient of the Karelsprivilege)
- Taco Ludigman, fl. c. 830 (also rendered as Focko Ludigman; protected the country against pirates)
- Adelbrik Adelen, fl. c. 830 (won a victory over a Swedish duke at Kollum)
- Hessel Hermana, 869–876 (a diligent warrior against the Vikings)
- Igo Galema (also spelt Ygo Galema), 876–910
- Gosse Ludigman, 986–1000
- Saco Reinalda, 1150–1167 (many Frisians were recruited into the Crusades to the Holy Land)
- Sicko Sjaerdema, 1237–1260 (Count William II of Holland offered him regional rule of Friesland)
- Reinier Camminga, 1300–1306 (killed in the fight against "Danes Noertmannen ende")
- Hessel Martena, 1306–1313 (protected Friesland against the attacks of the counts of Holland)
- Juw Juwinga (also rendered Jonghema Ju), 1396 (killed in the Battle of Schoterzijl against Albert I, Duke of Bavaria)
- Sytse Dekama, 1397–?
- Gale Hania, reign unknown
- Odo Botnia, ?–1399
- Sjoerd Wiarda, 1399–1410 (elected by the Schieringers for Oostergo)
- Haring Harinxma (also rendered as Haring Haringsma or Haring Thoe Heeg), 1399–1404 (elected by the Schieringers for Westergo)
- Juw Dekama, 1494–1498 (died 1523) (only governed Oostergo)

With the victory of the Schieringers against the Vetkopers, the newly installed office passed to the dukes of Saxony:

- Albert, Duke of Saxony, 1498–1500 (appointed as gubernator and potestaat by Maximilian I, Holy Roman Emperor)
- Henry IV, Duke of Saxony, 1500–1505 (died 1541)
- George, Duke of Saxony, 1505–1515 (died 1539)

== See also ==
- List of stadtholders in the Low Countries § Lordship of Frisia
- List of rulers of Frisia
