= Ygo Gales Galama =

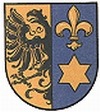
Coat of arms of the Galama family

Ygo Gales Galama (c. 1443 – 25 January 1492) was a 15th-century Frisian warlord and Galama-patriarch.

== Family and marriage ==
He was the son of Gale Yges Galama and Trijn Douwesdr Harinxma. The marriage of Gale and Trijn was an attempt to create a provisional peace between the warring factions of the Vetkopers and Schieringers. Gale came from a Vetkoper line and Trijn from a line of Schieringers. Ygo Gales Galama was married to Goslinga. The marriage is mentioned in the "Stamboek van de Friese Adel", which traces the genealogy and history of the Frisian nobility. The couple possessed fortified homes at Koudum, Hemelum and Oudega. From this marriage they had four children: Trijn, Otto, Maaike and Juw.

== The forest viking ==
Ygo was a rich and powerful Vetkoper with a notorious reputation. To his compatriots he was known as "the forest viking" but to his enemies het woudzwijn, the "forest swine".

== Late middle-ages ==
The late Middle Ages were an important period in the development of Friesland. Monks ensured dike construction, new agriculture methods and an increase of written sources. Some of the oldest records of Frisian text originate from this period. The eleven Frisian cities got their town rights, trade contacts were extended and a money economy arose. The 14th and 15th centuries however were dominated by fighting between competing noble families. The cause of the fighting, aligned along two monastical orders, the Schieringers and Vetkopers, was due to complex family relations in which family loyalty, honour and blood revenge played an important role. In particular the fighting took place between important noble families and the influential monasteries. The Schieringers had their largest group of followers in Westergo. The Vetkopers had their power base in the east of the province. The name Schieringers refers to the grey garments of the Cistercians (Middle Dutch schiere = grey). The Vetkopers ("buyers of fat" – trading in butter, cheese etc.) were associated with the Norbertines, who supposedly obtained their income from livestock-farming.

In 1439 the factionalism which had abated for some years started once again in Gaasterland: the Vetkoper Galamas against the Schieringer Harinxmas. A violent conflict that continued until 1456. The dispute in Oostergo (1441–1444) was settled through a court of law under the influence of Groningen. On August 15, 1456, the threat of Duke Philip the Good led to a new alliance against all landlords and the formation of a council 'of the Common Land of Vrieslandt'. Shortly thereafter the Donia War (1458–1463) began, followed by an explosion of other disputes; the towns Sneek now played a large role, some actively, some passively (Dokkum 1470, the Beer Uproar of Leeuwarden in 1487). Attempts by the Emperor to settle the dispute proved fruitless. Holland could not supply the Vetkopers the help they needed, from which the Groningers profited until they themselves were defeated while laying siege to Franeker and had to abandon Westergo (1496).

== Later years and death ==
The arrival of duke Albrecht in 1498 ensured a central authority that not only provided a visible presence, but also provided clear legislation and jurisdiction. The duke introduced general governing board measures, such as laws and taxes. The arrival of Albrecht and the setting-up of a governing board appropriate for Friesland however did not go without problems.

Fragments from the ' doodtboeck ' (deathbook) of Ernestus van Harinxma.

In 1613 Ernestus van Harinxma van Donia, a descendant of Haring Harinxma (Haring Donia) wrote a book concerning the deaths of Frisian nobles. In the 'Doodtboeck' he describes the violent struggle between the Schieringers and Vetkopers. Below is a report of the assassination of Ygo Gales Galama.

From the 'Doodtboeck':

Transcription (in Middle Dutch) Anno 1492 Den 25 januari worde Ygo Galama in een slach by Worckum van den Schyringers gevangen ende dootlyck ghewont ende naedat hy ghebiecht hadde is hy des selven nachts tot 9 uren van Seerp Beyma knechten noch dootgheslaegen. Alsoo dat die stoute helt ende het hooft der Vetcoepers in Westerghoo aldaer sijn affganck ende eynde ghecreegen heeft.

English translation: In the year 1492 on 25 January Ygo Galama in a battle near Workum got caught by the Schieringers and [got] mortally wounded. And after he had confessed, he was yet beaten to death on the same night at 9 o'clock by the soldiers of Seerp Beyma. Thus that this brave hero and leader of the Vetkopers in Westergo there met his passing and end.

== Ancestry of Ygo Gales Galama ==
- Direct descendant of Ygo II Galama (died 910) fifth Potestate of Friesland.
- Great-grandson of Haring Harinxma (Haring Donia) (abt. 1323–1403), Potestate of Friesland in 1398.
- First cousin 3 times removed of Pier Gerlofs Donia (abt 1480–1520), Frisian freedom fighter and leader of the infamous Arumer Black Heap.
- Direct descendant of Ige Galama (also known as Ygo Joukes Galama, see Frisian Crusaders) died in 1099 during the First Crusade and buried in Antioch, see Siege of Antioch.
