= Hessel Martena =

Potestaat of Friesland (c. 1306–1312)

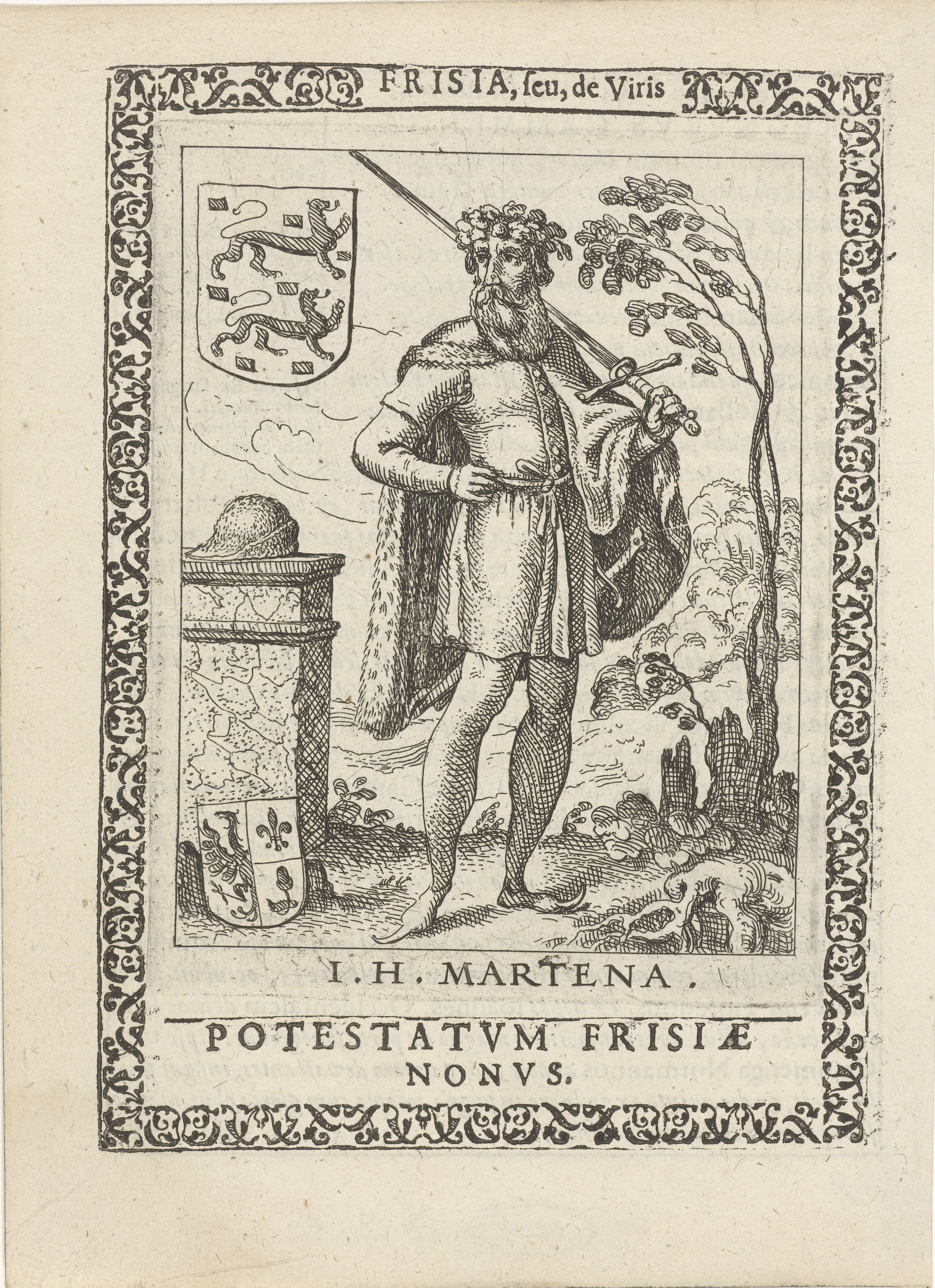
Print of Martena by Pieter Feddes van Harlingen, c. 1619

Hessel Martena (appointed approximately 1306 to 1312) was the tenth potestaat of Friesland. He succeeded Reinier Camminga.

Martena was particularly praised for his clever policy, calming the existing dispute between the Schieringers and Vetkopers which had developed to an extreme extent in his time.

After three centuries, the Dutch count William III of Holland, made an attempt to take over Friesland during his administration. In 1309, William landed with a fleet of 1500 "heads" in Gaasterland. Hessel had Count William fleeing back to his ships.

After the death of Hessel on 16 August 1312, the conflict between the Vetkopers and Schieringers erupted again. The parties could not even agree about the appointment of a next Potestaat.

Hessel's life is described by Johannes Vlieterp, the successor to the historian Occo Scarlensis.

Hessel had four daughters and no sons, so his surname was not inherited. The next Potestaat was Juw Juwinga.
