= Odo Botnia =

Potestaat of Friesland (died 1399)

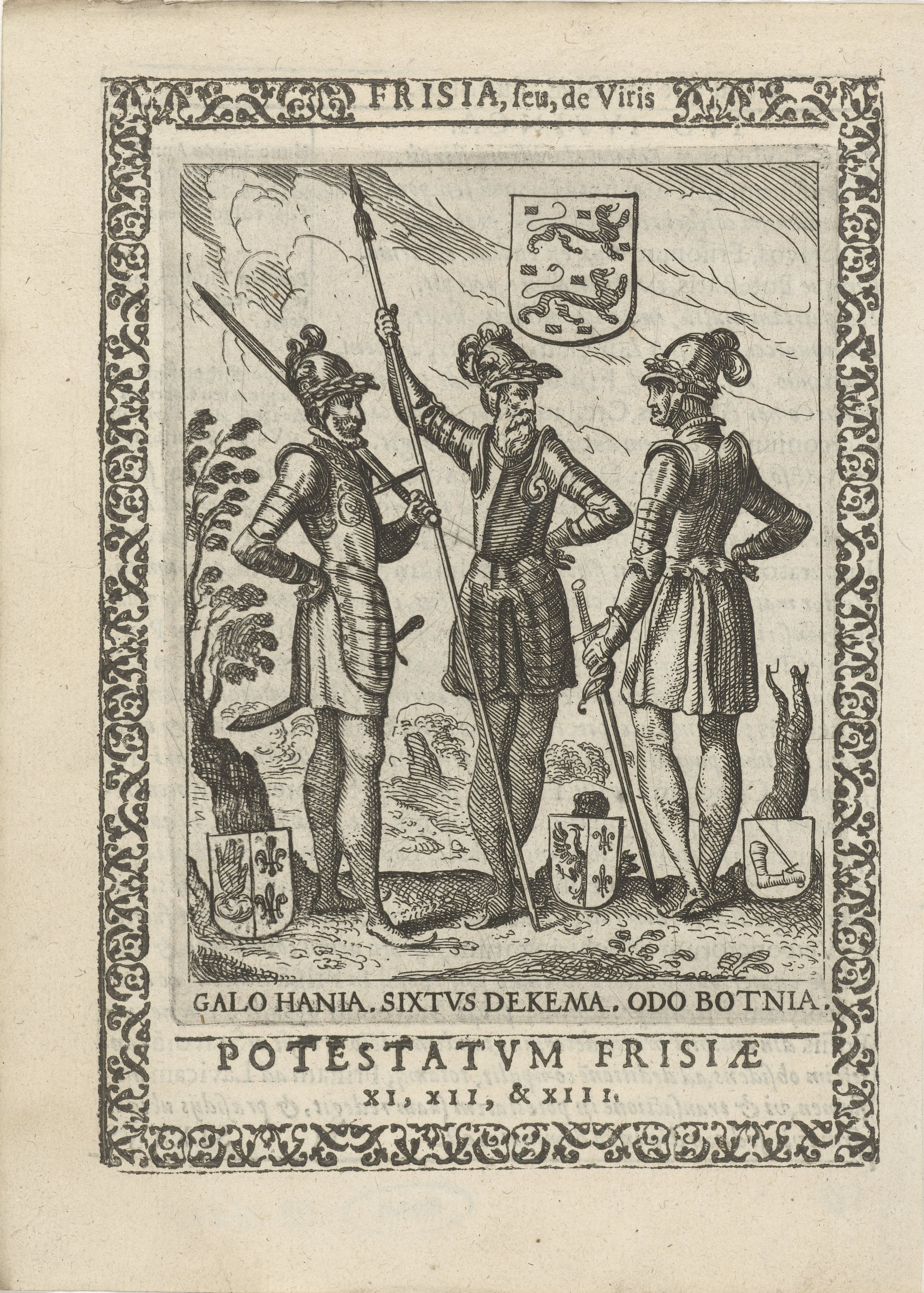
Print of Botnia alongside his two predecessors by Pieter Feddes van Harlingen (c. 1619)

Odo Botnia (died 1399) was the fourteenth potestaat of Friesland, now a province in the Netherlands.

== Biography ==
Odo was the son of Feicko Botnia, a nobleman of Marrum, who lived on the Botnia stins (stronghold or nobles' house). He was likely a descendant of the original Odo Botnia, who had built a stins at Marrum by 900. This stins was still inhabited by Helena Botnia in the year 1708, who was the last of the Botnia family. Unlike his predecessors, he belonged to the party of Vetkopers.

Odo was known for being unflinching and "kloekmoedig" (valiant), but also a cruel soldier who, along with his brother-in-law Jackla Jeppema, spread fear among the Schieringers (a rival faction). With the withdrawal from the Foswerd, Odo inflicted significant harm on the Schieringers in Westergo through murders, fires, and looting.

== Menaldumer Mieden ==
The Schieringers Sytse Dekama and Gale Hania returned after seven years of service abroad with foreign powers. Upon their return, they found their two stinses at Weidum destroyed by Vetkopers. This led to the Battle of Menaldumer mieden between Marssum and Dronrijp on August 18, 1397, where Odo Botnia was severely injured.

Odo Botnia was preceded by Gale Hania and succeeded by Sjoerd Wiarda.

== See also ==
- Rulers of Frisia
