= Haring Harinxma =

Frisian chieftain (1323–1404)

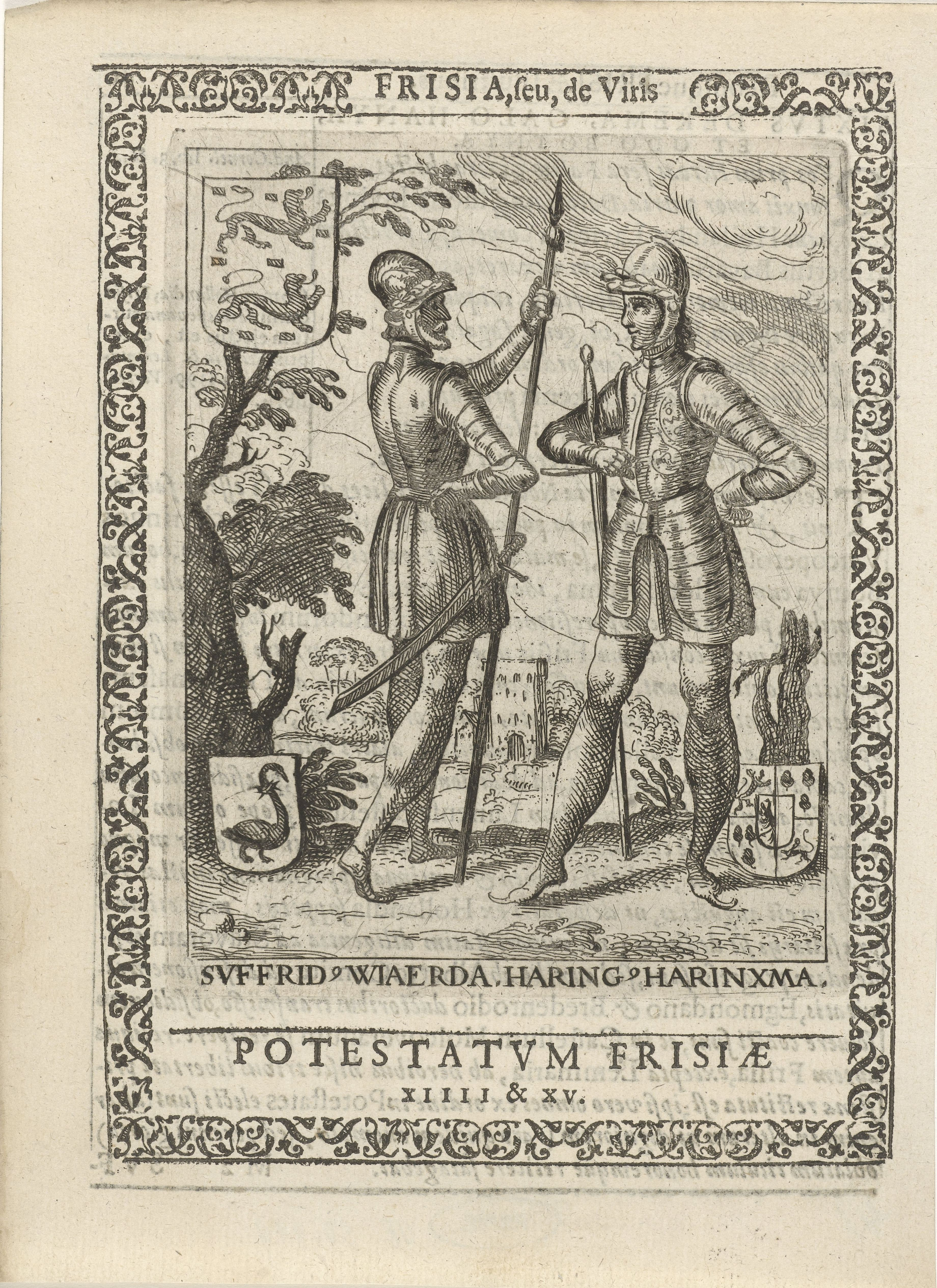
Art of Harinxma and Sjoerd Wiarda by Pieter Feddes van Harlingen, c. 1619

Haring Harinxma (1323–1404) was a powerful Frisian chieftain and Schieringer who lived during the 14th and early 15th centuries. Haring also used the surname Donia, and is considered the patriarch of this well known Frisian family. Another title used by Haring was thoe Heeg meaning 'of Heeg', where he was born and lived.

The Schieringers elected him potestate of Westergo (southwest corner of Friesland, modern Wymbritseradeel), together with Sjoerd Wiarda, van Gotum of Oostergo (eastern region of Friesland) in the struggle against the count of Holland in 1399. The appointment of Potestates aligned with the Schieringers lead to renewed factionalism between the Vetkopers and Schieringers.

Seventeen 'Landsheeren' (sovereign lords) or Potestates served Friesland, from Magnus Forteman in 809 until the last, Juw Dekama, van Baard in 1494.

Continued 'bloody' factionalism between the Schieringers and the Vetkopers finally resulted in the Holy Roman Emperor, Maximilian I, installing Albert, Duke of Saxony (b. 1443) as hereditary governor of Friesland in 1498.
