= Juw =

Juw or JUW may refer to:

- Juw Dekama (1449/1450–1523), Frisian chieftain
- Juw Juwinga (died 1396), Frisian chieftain
- Jinnah University for Women, in Karachi, Pakistan
- Wãpha language
