= Sjoerd Wiarda =

Potestaat of Friesland (r. 1399–1410)

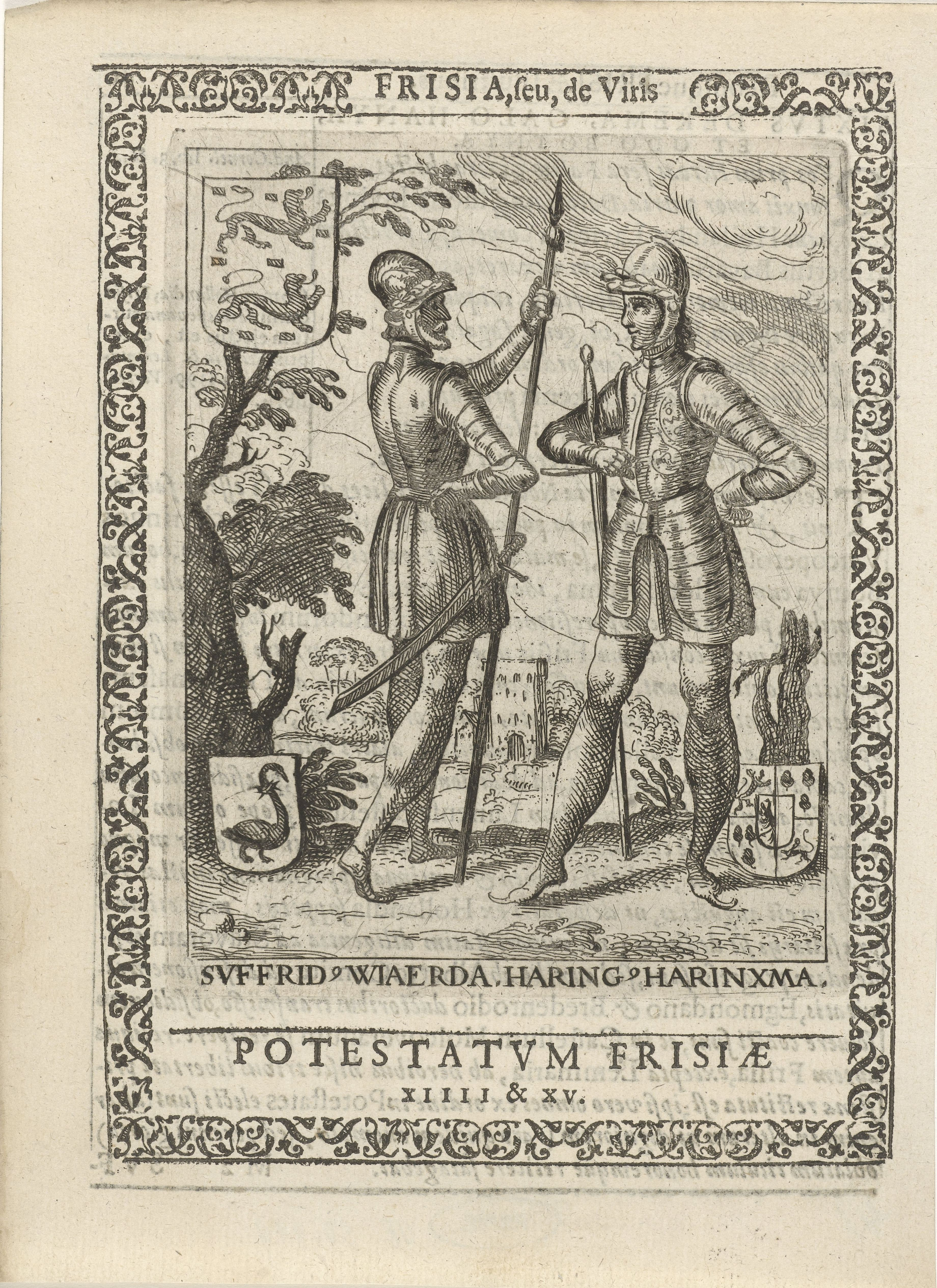
Art of Wiarda and Haring Harinxma by Pieter Feddes van Harlingen, c. 1619

Sjoerd Pijbes Wiarda (in office 1399–1410) was the fifteenth potestaat of Friesland (or elected governor) now a province of the Netherlands.

Sjoerd Wiarda born in 1355 and died in 1410. He was the son of Pybe Wyarda and Clear van Eminga. He lived on Wiarda estate at Goutum. He was the last potestaat to rule both Oostergo and Westergo.

Wiarda was the leader in the fight against the Count of Holland. In 1398 he was a delegate to the convention with Willem van Beijeren, Count of Holland. He was elected in 1399, succeeding Odo Botnia as potestaat. In 1400 he fought as a Schieringer in the Battle of Dokkum and Camminghastins.

== Succession ==
In 1400 there were several potestaats chosen for Oostergo and Westergo because of the religious disputes between Schieringers and Vetkopers. Haring Haringsma or Haring thoe Heeg, forefather of the Harinxma family, was elected for Westergo.
