= Gosse Ludigman =

Potestaat of Friesland (died 1000)

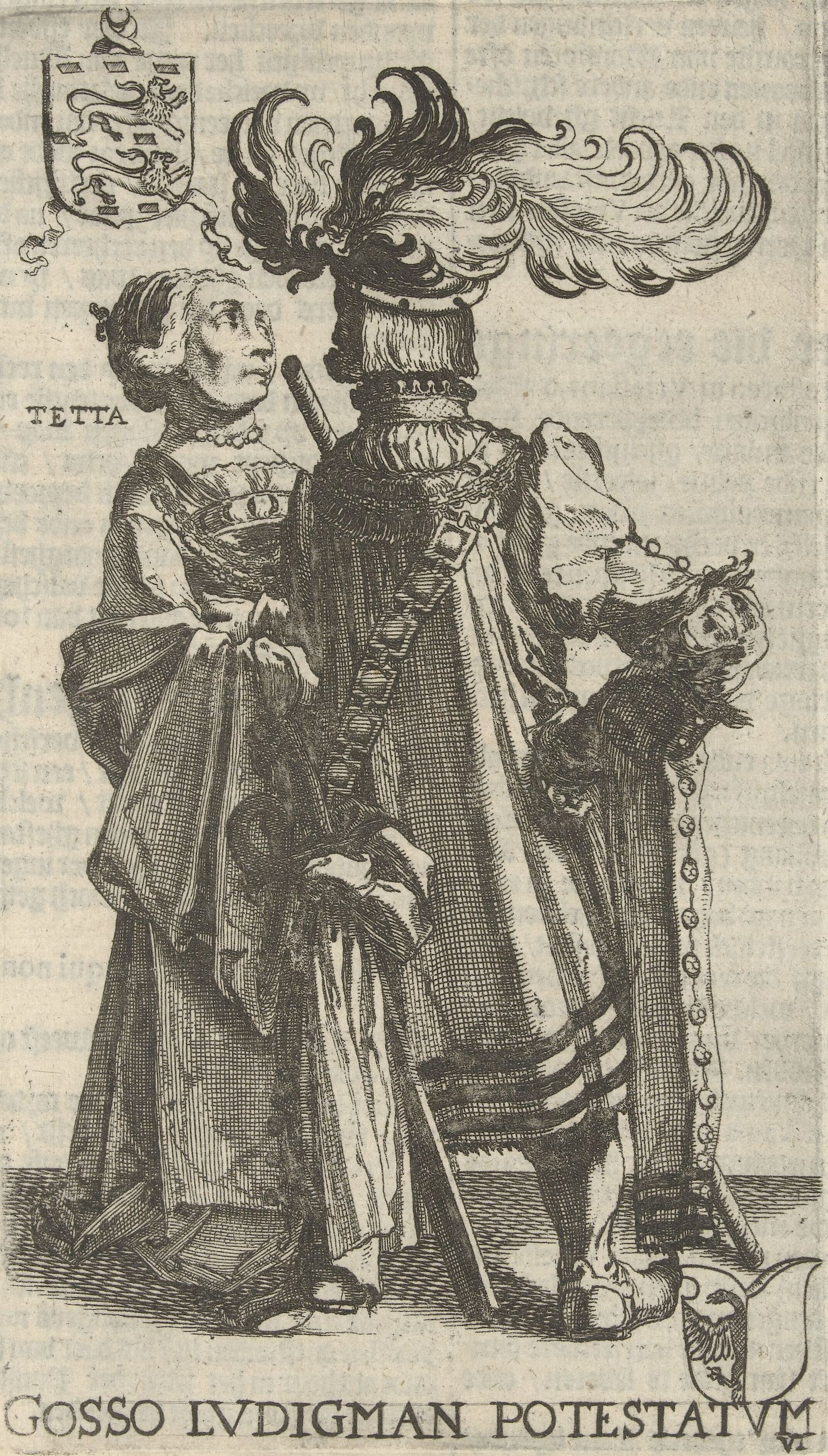
1622 print of Ludigman (right)

Gosse Ludigman was a legendary potestaat of Friesland, now a province of the Netherlands. He does not appear in sources until hundreds of years after his supposed life.

Gosse lived at Staveren, was married to Tetta Brederode and was elected potestaat in 989. In the chronicle of Egmond, by the fifteenth century Carmelite John of Leiden, who said: "Hij leefde ten tijde van graaf Arnoud, die zichzelf graaf van Oostergo en Westergo noemde zonder ooit enig gezag te hebben uitgeoefend" [He lived at the time of Count Arnoud who proclaimed himself count of Oostergo and Westergo without ever having any authority].

His predecessor was Igo Galema, and after his death the potestaat started to be elected to one-year terms. The next potestaat elected for life was Saco Reinalda in 1150.
