= Sytse Dekama =

Frisian potestaat

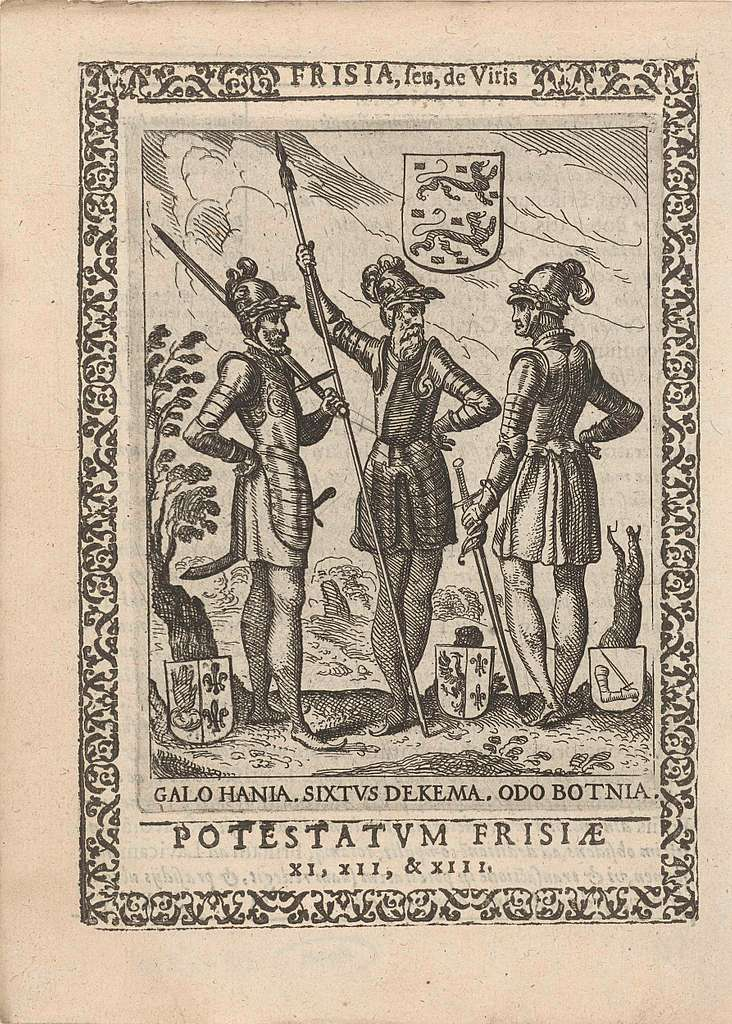
Gale Hania, Sytse Dekama, and Odo Botnia. Magistrates of Friesland in the 14th century

Sytse Dekama (as well as his successor Gale Hania from Weidum, chosen around 1397) was the twelfth potestaat (or magistrate ruler) of Friesland, which was in the time of the religious disputes between Schieringers and Vetkopers. Little is known about Sytse Dekama; only the historian Occo Scarlensis mentions Dekama. He succeeded Juw Juwinga when Juwinga died in 1396.
