= Gale Hania =

Potestaat of Friesland (died 1380)

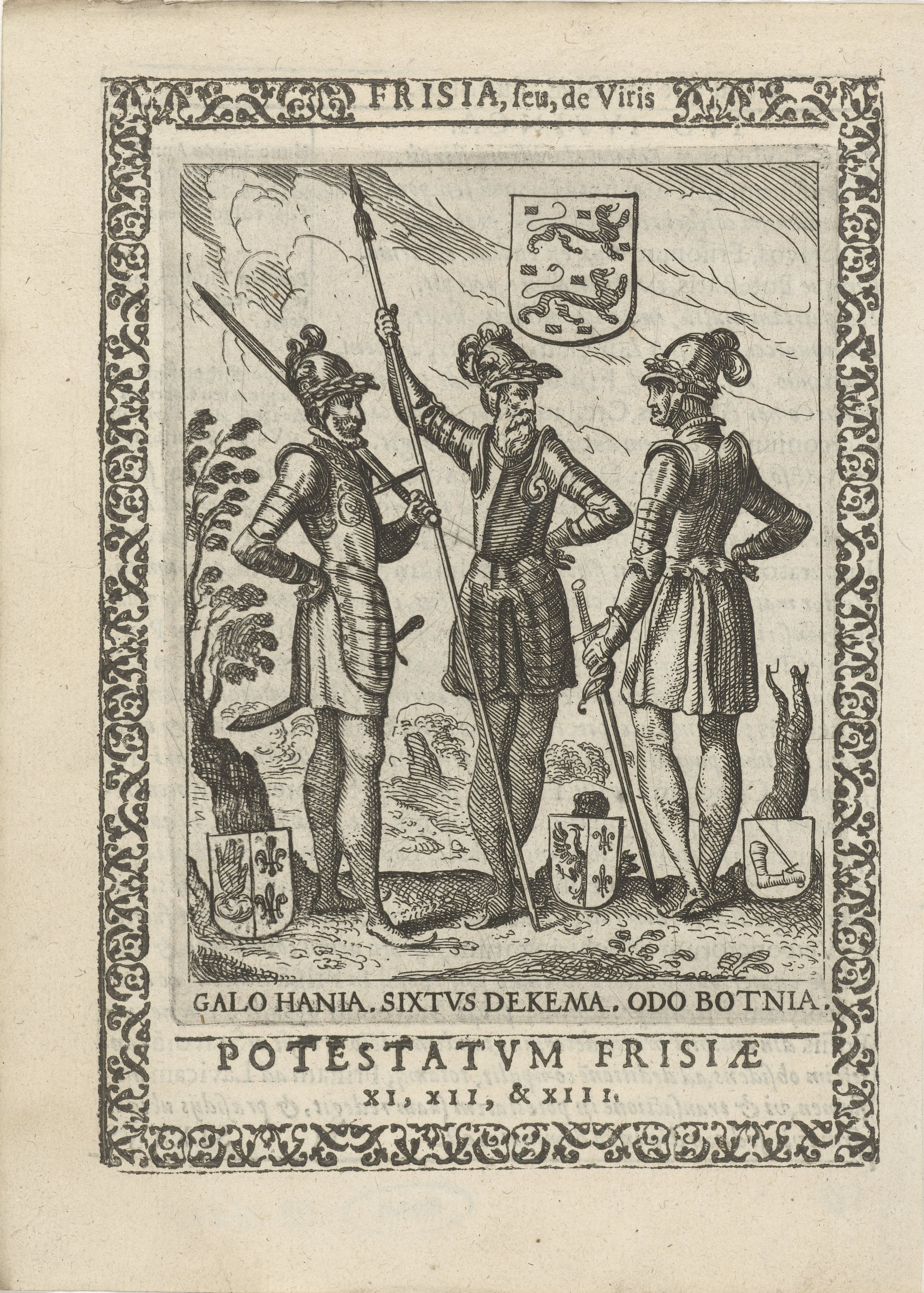
Gale Hania, Sytse Dekama, and Odo Botnia, consecutive potestaten of Friesland (Pieter Feddes van Harlingen, c. 1619)

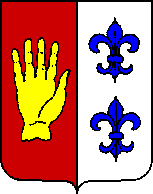
Hania coat of arms

Gale Hania (died 1380) was the thirteenth potestaat (or ruler) of Friesland, a province of Netherlands.

== Biography ==
His name is also known written as Hanja or Hanya. Gale was born on the Hanya farm northeast of Pingjum, in the shire of Wonseradeel. The path alongside this farm is now called the Hanialaan.

On July 4, 1380 around Arum a battle occurred between the monks of Ludingakerk (near Midlum) and those of Oldeklooster (near Hartwert), where a total of more than 130 men died. The nobles Sicke Gratinga and Gale Hania, were severely injured, and were taken back to Ludingakerk .

From the family Hania there are three signatories to the Covenant of the Nobles, Jorryt, Otto and Leo Hania.

== See also ==
- List of rulers of Frisia
