= Sicko Sjaerdema =

Potestaat of Friesland (died 1260)

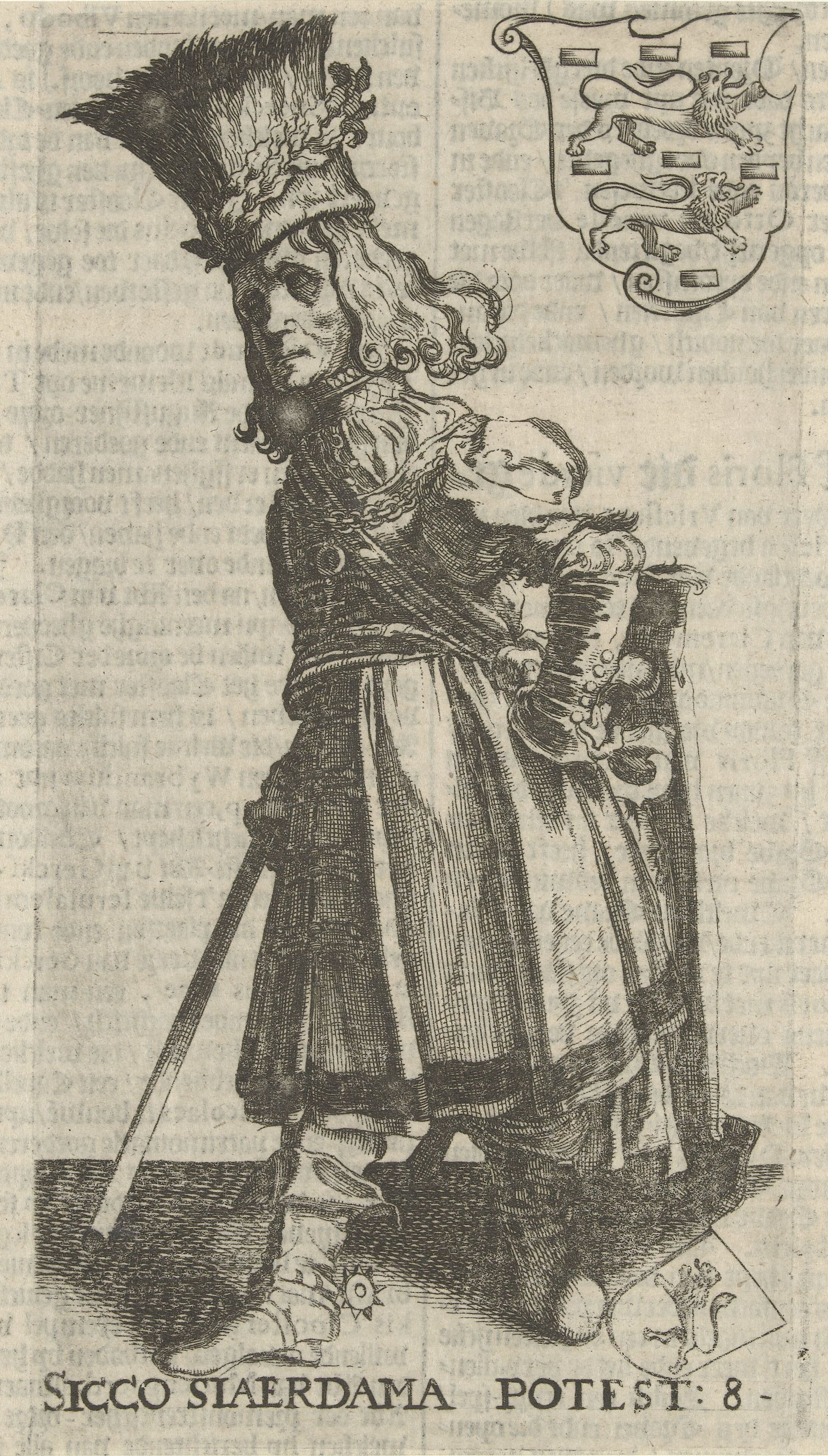
Print of Sjaedrema from 1622

Sikke Sjaardema (died 1260), alternatively spelled Sikko or Sicka, was the eighth potestaat of Friesland, a province of the Netherlands. The potestaat was the elected provincial ruler.

== Biography ==
Sjaerdema came from Ylst or IJlst (Elostoe in Latin) and was elected to Potestaat by the men of Friesland in 1237.

Count William II of Holland offered Sicko regional rule on the Friesian lands. Around the year 1250, Sjaardema made IJlst the province's capital where municipal laws were judged.

Sicko had a military success in 1252. Abel, the "King of Norway" fell in East Friesland. The Frisians killed king Abel and many of his troops on 12 June 1252 Petrus Thaborita had the year as 1250 which is almost correct, and that Abel was king of Denmark.

== See also ==
- List of rulers of Frisia
