= Hessel Hermana =

Potestaat of Friesland (r. 869 – c. 876)

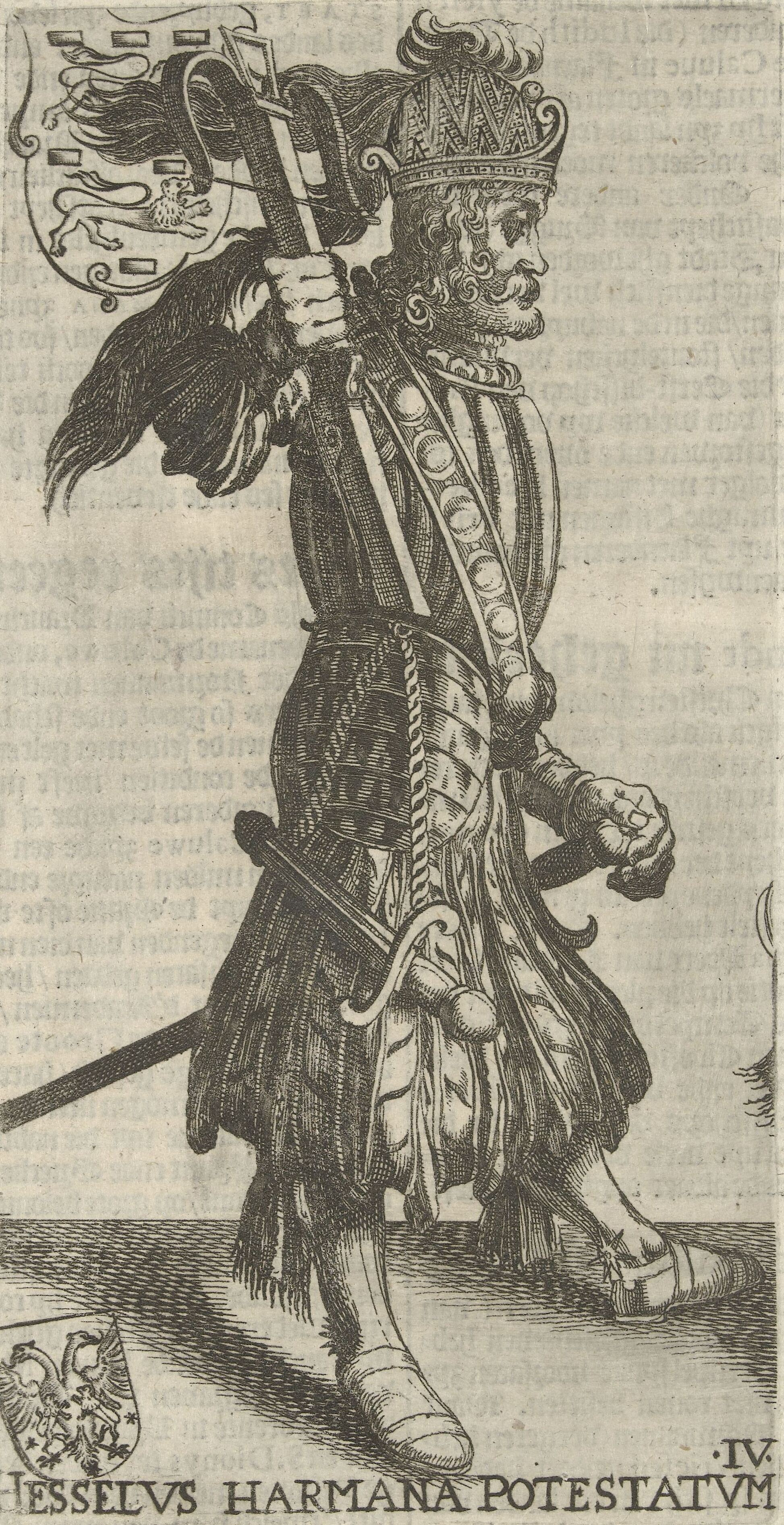
1622 print of Hermana

Hessel Hermana is the fourth potestaat of Friesland. Supposedly from Sexbierum (chosen 869 – died c. 876), he does not appear in historical sources until the late 16th century.

His name is then attached to the Dane Rudolf Haraldsson who invaded Oostergo in order to recover Danegeld (tribute) by force. These Danes were on the way back from France. A battle ensued with this gang of eight hundred Vikings involving the death of five hundred Danes on the battlefield. Rudolf Haraldsson was killed in battle and the Frisians won, but Hessel also died.

His predecessor was Adelbrik Adelen and he was succeeded by Igo Galema as potestaat.

His family crest exhibits two Frisian eagles.
