= Adelbrik Adelen =

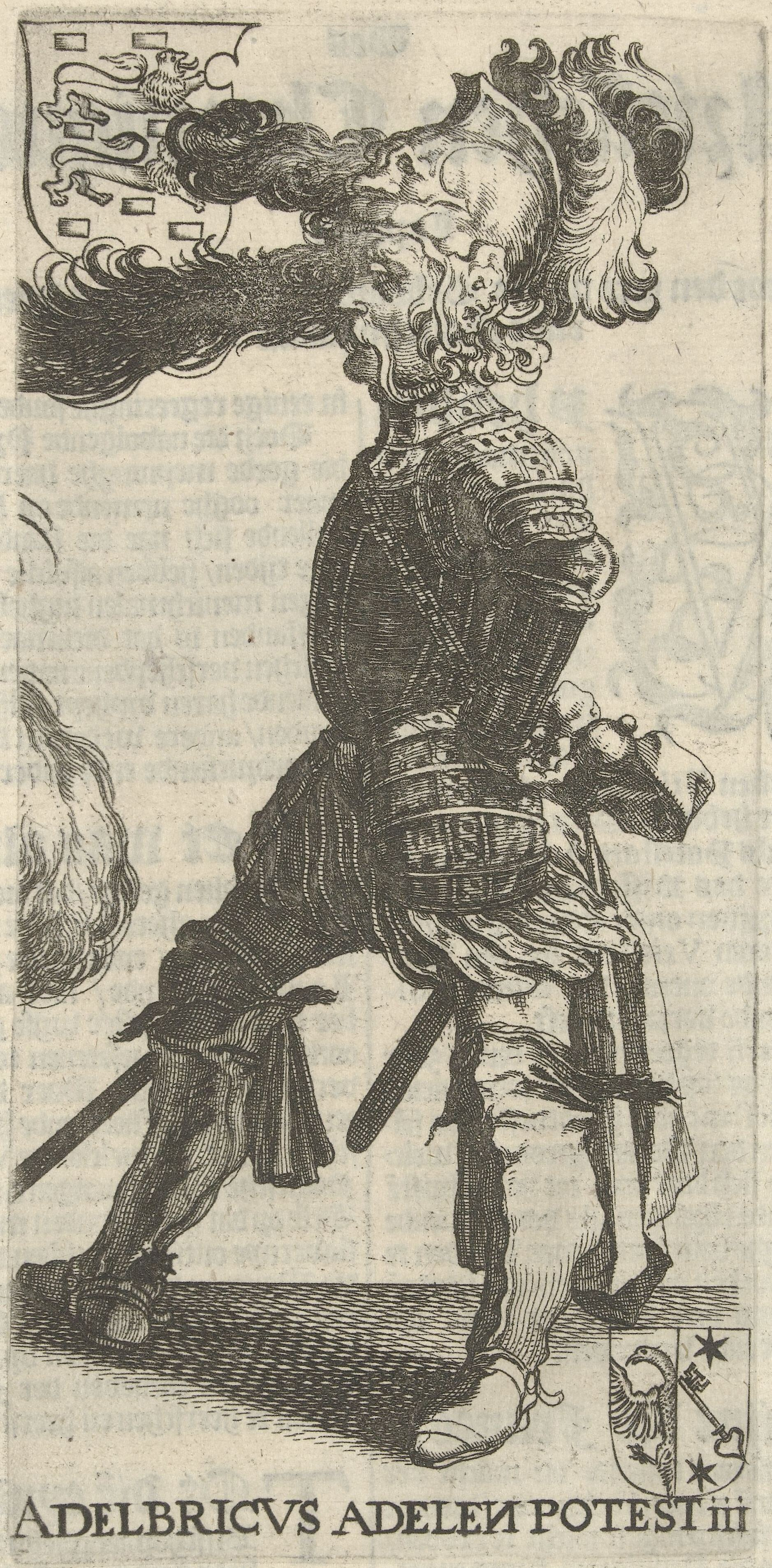
1622 print of Adelen

Adelbrik Adelen (Sexbierum, elected about 830) was the third potestaat (magistrate governor) of Friesland a province of the Netherlands.

He was potestaat during the government of Lorraine, and defeated the Vikings. In Kollum he won a victory over a Swedish duke. There is a source that indicates that he is a brother or a cousin of the Utrecht Bishop Frederik, who came from the same Friesian village of Sexbierum.

He succeeded Taco Ludigman, and in turn was succeeded by Hessel Hermana.

The family emblem of Adelen is a Friese eagle half left, and right on a blue field up with a key above. To the upper left and right is a 5-pointed star.
