= Taco Ludigman =

Potestaat of Friesland (fl. 819)

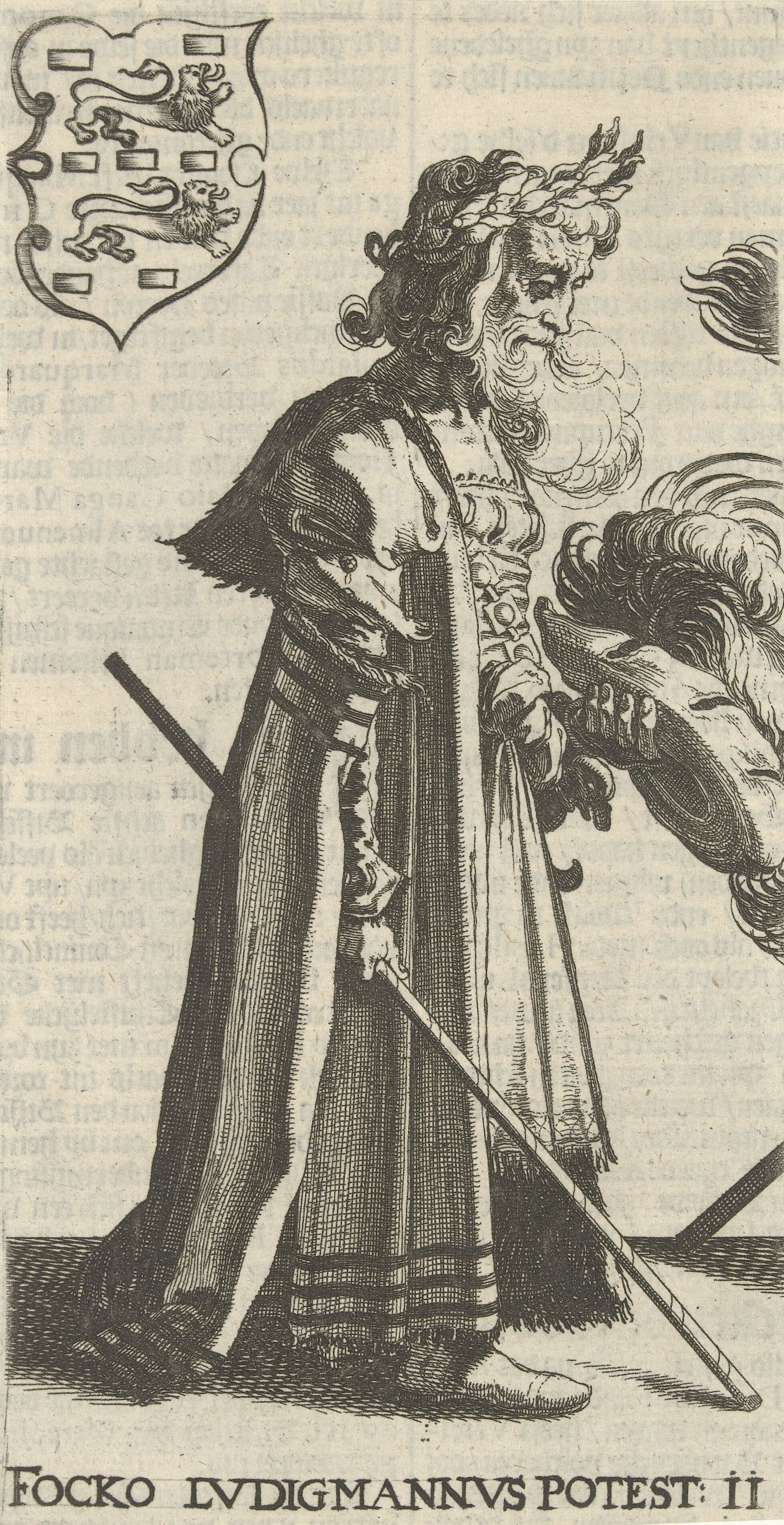
1622 print of Ludigman

Taco Ludigman (elected about 819) was the legendary second potestaat (or magistrate governor) of Friesland. There are no contemporary sources for his true historicity, nor are there any coins or other archaeological evidence.

Taco or Focko Ludigman was potestaat of Friesland in the final part of the reign of Louis the Pious. He succeeded Magnus Forteman as potestaat. During the Lotharingian control he was succeeded by Adelbrik Adelen, of Sexbierum.
