= Podestà =

Medieval Italian equivalent to mayor in some cities

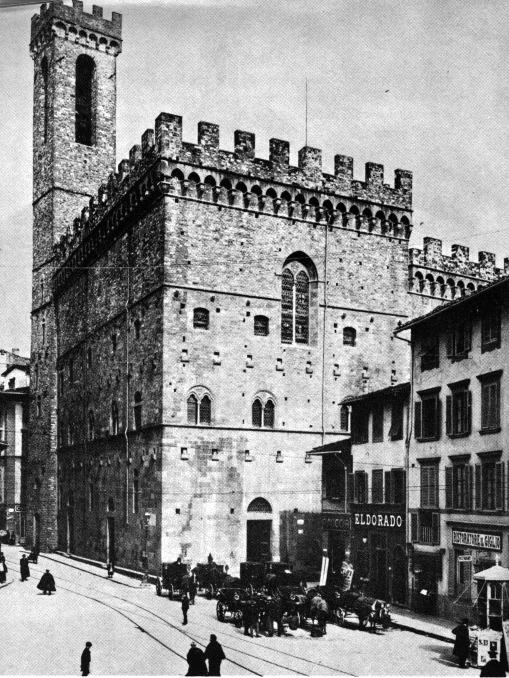
The Palace of the Podestà in Florence, now the Bargello museum

Podestà (Italian: [podeˈsta]), also potestate or podesta in English, was the name given to the holder of the highest civil office in the government of the cities of central and northern Italy during the Late Middle Ages. Sometimes, it meant the chief magistrate of a city-state, the counterpart to similar positions in other cities that went by other names, e.g. rettori ('rectors').

In the following centuries up to 1918, the term was used to designate the head of the municipal administration, particularly in the Italian-speaking territories of the Austrian Empire. The title was taken up again during the Fascist regime with the same meaning.

The podestà's office, its duration and the residence and the local jurisdiction were called podesteria, especially during the Middle Ages, and in later centuries, more rarely during the Fascist regime.

Currently, podestà is the title of mayors in Italian-speaking municipalities of Graubünden in Switzerland, but it is not the case for the Canton of Ticino, which uses the title sindaco (the same currently in use throughout Italy).

== Etymology ==
The term derives from the Latin word potestas ('power'). There is a similar derivation for the Arabic term سلطان sulṭān, originally meaning 'power' or 'authority'; it eventually became the title of the person holding power.

== History ==
The first documented usage of podestà was in Bologna in 1151, when it was applied to Guido di Ranieri di Sasso of Canossa, brought in from Faenza to be rettore e podestà, noted in numerous documents. Leander Albertus gives the particulars:

The citizens, seeing that there often arose among them quarrels and altercations, whether from favoritism or friendship, from envy or hatred that one had against another, by which their republic suffered great harm, loss and detriment; therefore, they decided, after much deliberation, to provide against these disorders. And thus they began to create a man of foreign birth their chief magistrate, giving him every power, authority and jurisdiction over the city, as well over criminal as over civil causes, and in times of war as well as in times of peace, calling him praetor as being above the others, or podestà, as having every authority and power over the city.

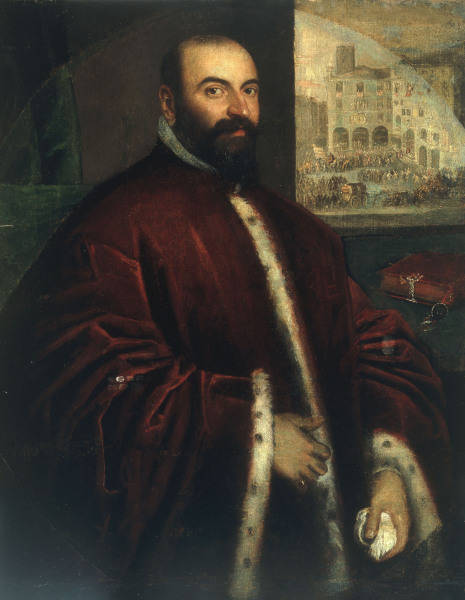
Portrait of a Podestà by Lodewijk Toeput

Podestà were first more widely appointed by the Holy Roman Emperor Frederick Barbarossa when he began to assert the rights that his Imperial position gave him over the cities of northern Italy; at the second imperial diet at Roncaglia, November 1158, Frederick appointed in several major cities imperial podestà "as if having imperial power in that place". The elected consuls, which Frederick had claimed the right to ratify, began to designate directly. The business of the podestà was to enforce imperial rights. From the start, this was very unpopular, and their often arbitrary behaviour was a factor in bringing about the formation of the Lombard League and the uprising against Frederick in 1167.

Although the Emperor's experiment was short-lived, the podestà soon became important and common in northern Italy, making their appearance in most communes around the year 1200, with an essential difference. These officials were now appointed by the citizens or by the citizens' representatives, rather like the older consuls (but not collegial). The podestà exercised the supreme power in the city, both in peace and war, and in foreign and domestic matters alike; but their term of office lasted only about a year.

In order to avoid the intense strife so common in Italian civic life, it soon became the custom to hire a stranger to fill this position. Venetians were in special demand for this purpose during the 12th and 13th centuries. This was probably due to their lesser concern (at the time) than other Italians in the affairs of the mainland. Afterwards, in a few cases, the term of office was extended to cover a period of years, or even a lifetime. They were confined in a luxury palace to keep them from being influenced by any of the local families. The architectural arrangement of the Palazzo Pubblico at Siena, built starting in 1297, evokes the uneasy relation of the commune with the podestà, who in Siena's case was a disinterested nobleman at the head of the judiciary. It provided a self-contained lodging round its own interior court for the podestà, separate but housed within the Palazzo Pubblico where the councillors and their committee of nine habitually met.

During the later part of the twelfth and the whole of the thirteenth century, most Italian cities were governed by a podestà. Concerning Rome, with a history of civic violence, Gregorovius says that "in 1205 the Pope Innocent III changed the form of the civic government; the executive power lying henceforward in the hand of a single senator or podestà, who, directly or indirectly, was appointed by the pope". In Florence after 1180, the chief authority was transferred from the consuls to the podestà, and Milan and other cities were also ruled by these officials. The Republic of Genoa elected its first podestà in 1191, a Brescian citizen, to quell the internal unrest that ravaged the capital of the Republic. There were, moreover, podestà in some of the cities of the adjoining Provence in southeastern France.

An anonymous writer composed a short guide for the would-be podestà (although it would be unseemly to appear openly to run for the office), Oculus pastoralis, of about 1222; in six simple and brief chapters it guides the novice through the requirements of the office, the salary, the address of welcome given by the retiring podestà to the new one, the choice of counsellors, the handling of money accounts. The fifth chapter offers some model speeches on public occasions, such as the death of prominent citizens. A final chapter touches upon making war (in a paragraph), and the training of urban officials.

In the thirteenth century in Florence, in Orvieto (1251) and some other cities, a capitano del popolo (lit. 'captain of the people') was chosen to look after the interests of the lower classes (to this day, the heads of government of the little independent republic of San Marino are still called "capitani"). In other ways the power of the podestà was reduced—they were confined more and more to judicial functions until they disappeared early in the sixteenth century.

The officials sent by the Italian republics to administer the affairs of dependent cities were also sometimes called podestà. Into the 20th century the cities of Trento and Trieste gave the name of podestà to their chief magistrate.

=== Fascist era ===
The Fascist regime created its own version of the podestà figure. In February 1926, Mussolini's Senate issued a decree which abolished the autonomous powers and functions of comuni (municipalities), including elected town councils and mayors. Instead, all comuni, except for Rome, were to be headed by a podestà, an authoritarian mayor with full executive and legislative powers. He was appointed by royal charter (in practice, by the National Fascist Party) for a renewable five-year term (which could be revoked at any time with immediate effect). In Rome, a governor was appointed to head the local government. In larger communes, the podestà was assisted by one or two vice-podestà nominated by the Ministry of Interior, in addition to a board of advisors (consulta municipale) nominated either by the local prefect or, in the major cities, by the Ministry of Interior.

The decree was in effect from 21 April 1927 until 1945, when the entire system was abandoned with the return to democracy.

== Podesteria ==
Literally, this derived word means the office of a podestà or its term, but podesteria can also designate a district administered by a podestà within a larger state.

In the Domini di Terraferma that the dogal Republic of Venice gradually established in the basin of the river Po, annexing various former principalities and self-governing cities, mostly in the fifteenth century, podesteria (Venetian: podestarie) were one of the intermediate levels of the hierarchical administrative organization, the highest ("provincial") level being the territorio (roughly a modern administrative region).

After the other dogal republic, Genoa, was in 1273 granted control of Pera and Galata, commercial suburbs of Constantinople, by the Byzantine emperor, it governed them jointly by a common podestà until 1453, when all Constantinople was conquered by the Ottoman Turks.

== Outside the Italian city-states ==
The example of Italy in the matter of podestà was sometimes followed by cities and republics in Northern Europe in the Middle Ages, notably by such as had trade relations with Italy. The officers elected sometimes bore the title of podestà or podestat. Thus in East Frisia, there were podestà identical in name and functions to those of the Italian republics; sometimes each province had one, and sometimes the federal diet elected a podestà-general for the whole country, the term of office being for a limited period or for life.

=== Frisian potestaat ===
The concept of a local man empowered to represent the Holy Roman Emperor was also a feature of medieval Frisia. From apocryphal beginnings, important rights were granted or confirmed under the code of law known as the Lex Frisionum. According to later tradition, it was Charlemagne who granted the Frisians the title of freemen and permitted them to choose their own podestat or imperial governor from among the chieftains, to organize and lead the defense of two of the three districts of Frisia, in Middle Frisia, from the Flie to the Lauwers and in East Frisia from the Lauwers to the Weser, later the Countship of Ostfriesland.

The Italians probably became aware of the Frisian Potestaat, in Dutch "op poten staan" in English 'on legs standing', like for instance king Henry on his painting (Dutch: potestaat; German: Potestat; English: potestate) during the Sixth Crusade in 1228. According to privileges that were falsely ascribed to the Carolingian era, the potestate was chosen by council and he must be able to slay knights. Apocryphal historical writings mention the potestate as early as the Viking Age.

The only potestates chosen to lead Friesland between the Vlie and Lauwers were Juw Juwinga (1396) and Juw Dekema (1494), both were chosen by the Schieringers. However, in 1399 the districts of Westergo and Oostergo elected potestates, Haring Harinxma and Sjoerd Wiarda respectively, in the struggle against the count of Holland. The title became well known outside of Friesland only with the installation of Albrecht of Saxony as hereditary potestate in 1498; the Frisians chose Jancko Douwama as their imperial stadtholder (1522).

== See also ==
- Capitano Reggente
- Gonfaloniere
- Podestà of Constantinople
