= Sudergoa =

Together with Westergoa and Eastergoa Sudergoa was one of the three goaën of the Dutch province of Friesland during the Middle Ages. From the 13th century on Sudergoa became a part of Westergoa.

Stavoren has been the centre of Sudergoa.
