= Warlord =

Person who has both military and civil control and power

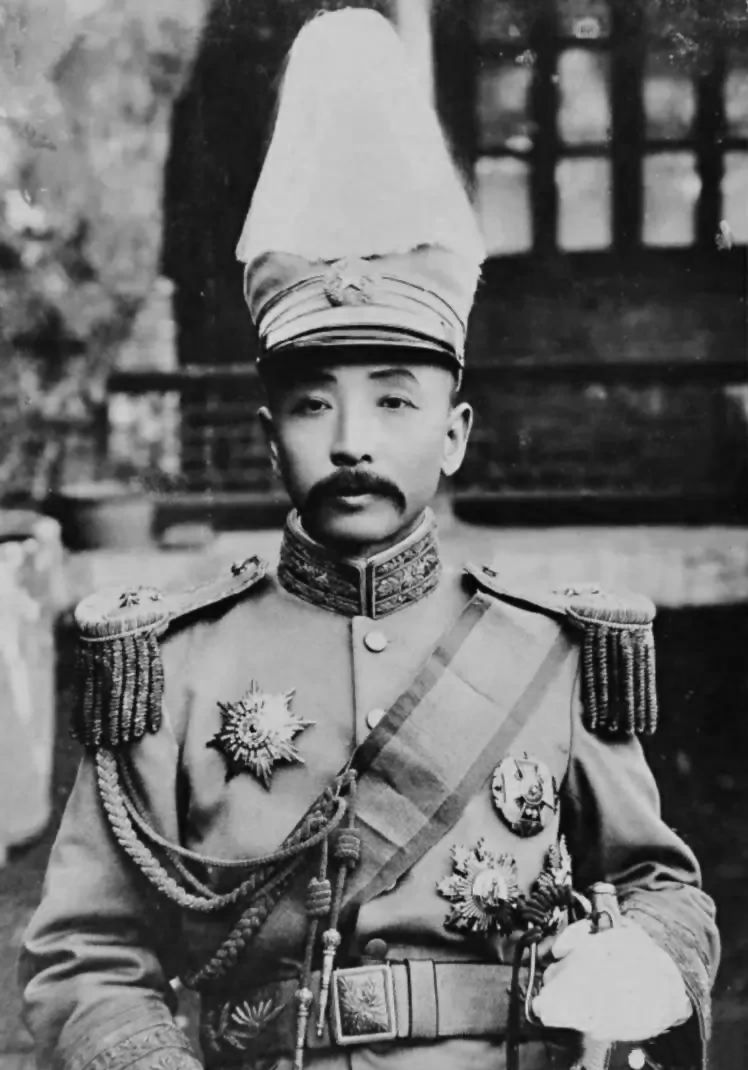
Marshal Zhang Zuolin, one of many warlords in early 20th-century China

Warlords are individuals who exercise military, economic, and political control over a region, often one without a strong central or national government, typically through informal control over local armed forces. Warlords have existed throughout much of history, albeit in a variety of different capacities within the political, economic, and social structure of states or ungoverned territories. The term is often applied in the context of China around the end of the Qing dynasty, especially during the Warlord Era. The term may also be used for a supreme military leader.

== Historical origins and etymology ==
The first appearance of the word "warlord" dates to 1856, when used by American philosopher and poet Ralph Waldo Emerson in a highly critical essay on the aristocracy in England, "Piracy and war gave place to trade, politics and letters; the 'war-lord' to the law-lord; the privilege was kept, whilst the means of obtaining it were changed."

During the First World War, the term appeared in China as Junfa (軍閥), taken from the Japanese gunbatsu. It was not widely used until the 1920s, when it was used to describe the chaos after 1918, when provincial military leaders took local control and launched the period that would come to be known in China as the Warlord Era. In China, Junfa is applied retroactively to describe the leaders of regional armies who threatened or used violence to expand their rule, including those who rose to lead and unify kingdoms.

== Conceptions of warlordism ==
=== Warlordism as the dominant political order of pre-state societies ===
The other major consideration in categorizing warlords is through the lens of history. Warlordism was a widespread, dominant political framework that ordered many of the world's societies until the modern state became globally ubiquitous. Often warlord governance in pre-modern state history was constructed along tribal or kinship lines and was congruent with early perception of "nation". In colonial empires warlords served in both cooperative political capacities and as leaders of rebellions. In modern states the presence of warlords is often seen as an indicator of state weakness or failure. American historian David G. Herrmann noted, "Warlordism is the default condition of humanity."

=== Economics of warlordism ===
Economist Stergios Skaperdas views warlordism as a default—albeit inefficient—competitive economic model that emerges in states where state capacity is low, but that innately evolves into an institution governing political order that uses violence or the threat of it to secure its access to "rent"-producing resources. It may actually have a stabilizing effect on a region. In both cases there is an inherent inefficiency in the model, as "resources are wasted on unproductive arming and fighting." However, the functionality is often sustainable because it presents citizens with no choice but to accept rent levies in exchange for protection. Charles Tilly, an American political scientist and sociologist, theorized that organized crime can function as a means for war and state making. He argues that the monopoly of crime by the state—in this case being the warlords—is in order to receive protection from external rivals as well as internal political rivals.

Political scientist Jesse Driscoll uses the term "redistribution politics" to classify the bargaining process between warlords and the regime in states where cooperative warlord politics prevails, and when that bargaining leads to accords or informal arrangements concerning the extraction of rent—which can refer to natural resources, territory, labor, revenue or privilege. In his study of warlordism in Georgia and Tajikistan, Driscoll cites "land reform, property ownership and transfers, privatization in non-transparent closed-bid settings, complex credit swaps cemented via marriages, money laundering, price-fixing schemes, and bribery", as principal sources of exchange in redistribution politics.

=== Understanding warlordism in the context of European feudalism ===
Noted theorist Max Weber suggested that classic feudalism in pre-modern-state Europe was an example of warlordism, as the state regime was unable to "exercise a monopoly on the use of force within its territory" and the monarch relied on the commitment of loyal knights and other nobility to mobilize their private armies in support of the crown for specific military campaigns. As noted French philosopher Alexis de Tocqueville and political scientists such as E. J. Hobsbawm and Theda Skocpol observed in their analyses of the Ancien Régime, the French Revolution and democratization in Europe, that commitment was contingent upon a bargaining process in which the king or queen had to guarantee additional territory, revenue, status or other privileges, meaning that these early European states were weak and the relationship between the crown and feudal lords constituted the form of interdependent warlordism known as cooperative warlord politics.

== Warlordism in the contemporary world ==
Within political science there is a growing body of research and analysis on warlordism that has emerged within weak states that have gained independence as a result of the collapse of empires. Warlord states are disproportionately concentrated within two regions—the former European colonies of Africa and the former Soviet republics of Eurasia.

=== Cooperative warlord politics ===
While warlords are commonly viewed as regional leaders who threaten the sovereignty of a state, there are a number of states where the central government functions in collusion with warlords to achieve its goal of exercising its sovereignty over regions that would otherwise fall outside its control. In such decentralized states, particularly those where armed groups challenge national sovereignty, warlords can serve as useful allies of a central government that is unable to establish a monopoly over the use of force within its national territory.

==== Philippines ====
As political scientist Dr. Ariel Hernandez documented, one example is the Philippines, where successive presidential administrations—at least since Ferdinand Marcos secured power in 1965—have "franchised violence to regional warlords" to counter the inroads of communist insurgents, Islamic rebels and organized criminal gangs. This has led to the formation of at least 93 "Partisan Armed Groups", armed militias loyal to regional warlords who, in exchange for their loyalty and willingness to use their private armies to quell the threats from these opposition groups, are granted a degree of autonomy within designated regions, the exclusive right to use violence and the right "to profit from the 'economy of violence' that they establish in their own areas".

==== Afghanistan ====
Warlordism in Afghanistan—another state where the central government is unable to extend political, military or bureaucratic control over large swaths of territories outside the capital—functions cooperatively within the framework of the state, at times. The warlords, with their established militias, are able to maintain a monopoly of violence within certain territories. They form coalitions with competing warlords and local tribal leaders to present the central government with a challenge, and often the state will bargain to gain access to resources or "rent", loyalty from the warlord and peace in the region.

In exchange for peaceful coexistence, the warlord coalitions are granted special status and privileges, including the right to maintain de facto political rule within the agreed-upon territory, exert force to retain their monopoly over violence and extract rent and resources. "By limiting access to these privileges, members of the dominant warlord coalition create credible incentives to cooperate rather than fight among themselves."

In the case of Afghanistan, state–warlord bargaining sometimes extends beyond these informal accords and elevates to the status of political clientelism, in which the warlords are appointed to formal government positions, such as regional governor; a title which provides them political legitimacy. During the state–warlord bargaining phase, warlords in Afghanistan have a high motivation to prolong war to create political instability, expose weakness of the central state, prompt regional criticism against the government and continue economic extraction.

==== Post-Soviet republics ====
In his study of warlordism in Georgia and Tajikistan, political scientist Jesse Driscoll emphasizes how the collapse of the Soviet Union precipitated the rise of militant, independence-seeking nationalist movements within the republics—particularly within the Central Asian and Caucasus regions—resulting in armed conflict and civil war. Many strongmen warlords had served in the Soviet military, police units or intelligence services and had experience operating within highly organized bureaucracies. These warlords formed well-structured militias that not only established political and economic control over territories, but institutionalized bureaucracies to establish and maintain their monopolies over violence and rent and "incentivizing the behavior of citizens within a particular geographical space". Driscoll termed this warlordism "militia coalition politics". A truce was reached without any disarmament of militias; instead, the warlord coalitions reached a non-violent "order producing equilibrium", and eventually agreed upon a warlord-friendly civilian figurehead to assume head-of-state duties to demonstrate the legitimacy as a sovereign state to the rest of the world. This opened up Georgia and Tajikistan as states eligible to receive international aid, which thereafter became a major source of "rent" for the warlords, providing them with resources to increase their power and influence over these societies. As Driscoll observed, the "warlords colluded to create a state".

=== Ungoverned warlordism, or warlords as "stationary bandits" ===
One political theory, pioneered by American economist Mancur Olson, posits that warlords can function as stationary bandits. In some African states, warlord politics can be a product of endowment-rich, extractable resources. Some nations, such as Liberia and Sierra Leone, have had stationary bandits who use extraction of resources such as diamonds, cobalt and timber ("conflict resources") in order to increase their political power. They often enforce their right to these resources by claiming to be protecting the people. These warlords, or stationary bandits, often partner with compliant foreign firms and create symbiotic relationships to yield greater power for the warlords and a source of wealth for external firms. The result is a political system in which a dominant coalition of warlords' strips and distributes valuable assets in exchange for bureaucratic services and security from foreign firms.

Stationary bandits can amass power because of their economic connections with foreign firms. Oftentimes warlords will exert violence on a particular region in order to gain control. Once in control, these warlords can expropriate the property or resources from the people and land and redistribute the riches in exchange for monetary value. When people live in a particular region dominated by a warlord, they can choose to flee or live within the political structure the warlords have created. If the warlords provide protection against external threats of violence, the people will be likely to stay and continue living and working in that region, even though they are being extorted. The trade-off becomes protection for extraction, and this political framework is common in periphery regions of countries which do not have a strong central government.

== Contemporary examples of warlordism ==
=== Afghanistan ===
Modern-day Afghanistan is a multiethnic, multilingual country inhabited by distinct and often competing tribal societies, its national borders defined only following the Treaty of Rawalpindi of 1919 between the United Kingdom and the Emirate of Afghanistan. Afghanistan was briefly a democratic state until a 1973 coup, which resulted in the April Revolution of 1978.

Historically, power in Afghanistan has been decentralized and governance delegated locally to ethnic tribal leadership. Tribal leaders often act as local warlords, representing either a tribal confederacy, a tribal kinship group or a smaller tribal lineage grouping, and are expected to provide security, justice and social services to their respective "constituencies". There are four dominant ethnic tribes in Afghanistan (Pashtuns, Tajiks, Hazaras, and Uzbeks), as well as a number of proportionally smaller tribes. The Pashtuns are the largest and most dominant ethnic tribe in the country, whose name translates to "Land of the Pashtuns". (Note: See Afghan (ethnonym).)

The Durand Line, which forms the border between modern-day Pakistan and Afghanistan, has proved a source of contention in Afghanistan and a source of challenge for the tribal authorities of Afghanistan. The line, which was negotiated between British diplomat and civil servant Mortimer Durand and Afghan Emir Abdur Khan, was a political boundary drawn in 1893 which clearly defined and demarcated the border between Afghanistan and the British Raj. Afghanistan unilaterally disputes the legitimacy of the border. Pashtuns are the prominent ethnic group in eastern Afghanistan and western Pakistan, and the Durand Line served to split their traditional homeland between two nation states. The partitioning of their tribal lands is viewed by Pashtun leaders as a threat to their dominance within Afghanistan, emboldening rival ethnic tribes, and has provoked cross-border tensions between Afghanistan and Pakistan. While having significant political, economic and social impact on Afghanistan, the intervention of the Soviet Union (1979–89), Afghan Civil War (1989–96), Taliban regime (1996–2001, 2021–present) and United States invasion and occupation (2001–2021) have not noticeably disrupted the primacy of ethnic tribal authority, and thus the power and influence of warlords, in ordering Afghan society. Although the United States and its coalition allies expended a considerable amount of time, effort and resources attempting to foment the centralization of government and consolidation of power in the state with its seat of power in Kabul, tribal warlords continued to maintain political influence and power throughout the country outside of Kabul.

While most warlords have power vested in them through traditional tribal customs, some hold formal regional government positions, but in both cases cooperation with the central government remains voluntary and reliant on incentives. Beginning in 2008, as it became increasingly evident that the central government in Kabul was incapable of extending its power and control to much of the country, the US military and diplomatic corps began exploring the option of engaging ethnic tribal warlords in negotiations, a strategy that continued through the Obama administration.

=== Russian Civil War and Chechen conflicts ===
Warlordism was widespread in Civil War-era Russia (1918–22). Many territories were not under the control of either the Red government in Petrograd (later in Moscow) or the White governments in Omsk and Rostov. These territories were controlled by warlords of various political colors. The Cossack ataman Semyonov held territories in the Transbaikalia region, and the 'Bloody Baron' Ungern von Sternberg was the dictator of Mongolia for a short time. Meanwhile, generals such as Kolchak or Denikin are typically not considered warlords as they created more stable military and governing structures that claimed legitimacy from the prewar Tsarist state.

The term "warlord" was frequently used when Russian and Chechen conflicts were reignited in the 1990s.

=== Liberia ===
Liberia's former president Charles Taylor was indicted as a diamond-embezzling warlord who aided and abetted Liberian rebels who committed widespread atrocities and human rights abuses. After seizing power from President Samuel Doe in a rebellion, Taylor won elections in 1997.

During his term of office Taylor was accused of war crimes and crimes against humanity as a result of his involvement in the Sierra Leone Civil War (1991–2002). His close friends included the late Col. Muammar Gaddafi of Libya; the conservative former ruler of Ivory Coast, Félix Houphouët-Boigny; the President of Burkina Faso, Blaise Compaoré; and a plethora of businessmen—local and foreign—who were bent on making money in Liberia and disregarded UN disapproval. Taylor was detained by the UN-backed Special Court for Sierra Leone in 2006 after a period of enforced exile in Nigeria. He was found guilty in April 2012 of all 11 charges levied by the Special Court, including terror, murder and rape.^{[9]} In May 2012 he was sentenced to 50 years in prison.

== Historical examples of warlordism ==
=== China ===
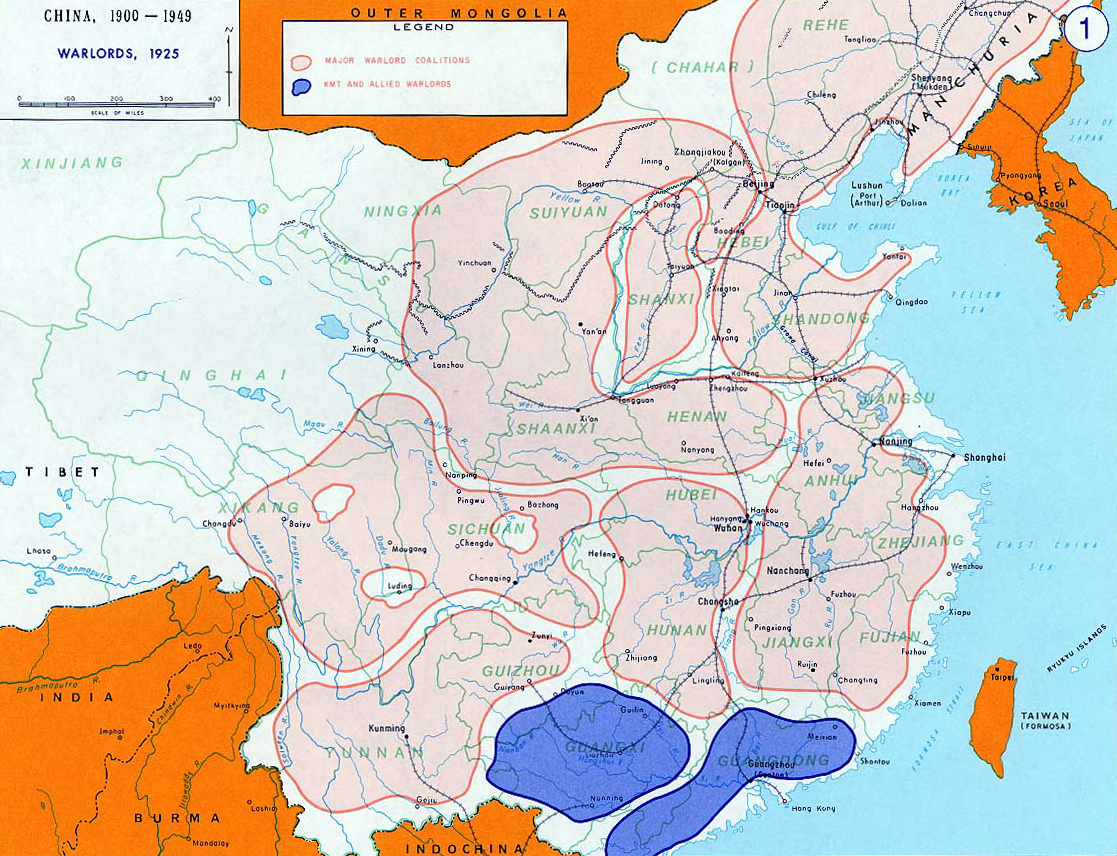
Major Chinese warlord coalitions as of 1925

Local warlords with their own militias began to emerge in the effort to defeat the Taiping Rebellion of the 1860s as the Manchu bannerman armies faltered and the central authorities lost much of their control. The Republic of China was led by Yuan Shikai, a dictator. The modern Warlord Era began in 1916 upon his death. The national government existed and handled foreign affairs, but it had little internal control until the late 1920s. A period of provincial and local rule under military strongmen known as the Warlord Era lasted until the Kuomintang (KMT; Chinese Nationalist Party) consolidated its rule over much of the country under Generalissimo Chiang Kai-shek in 1928.

Among the prominent leaders called warlords were Yan Xishan in Shanxi province, Feng Yuxiang, and Wu Peifu, who had reputations as reformers; Zhang Zuolin, who ruled in Manchuria until the Huanggutun Incident in 1928; and a number of local warlords with infamous reputations, such as Zhang Zongchang. Although Chiang Kai-shek ascended with legitimacy into his role of leadership of the KMT by succeeding Sun Yat-sen and was recognized by foreign nations, Chiang was accused by some of being a warlord because of his rise by military campaign. The two-year Northern Expedition campaign (1926–28) not only defeated the Beiyang Army but also toppled the Beiyang government. Chiang also conquered and conscripted the forces of rival warlords in the Central Plains War of 1930. This war essentially ended the Warlord Era, albeit with the continuing autonomy of several provinces.

=== Mongolia ===
After the fall of the Mongol Empire, Mongolia was divided between the Eastern and Western Mongols. At the time of disintegration, many warlords tried to enthrone themselves or rule the khanate jointly; however, there had been powerful de facto leaders in all parts of the Mongol Empire before. The empire and the states that emerged from it were born and shaped in part from the heavy influence of roving bandits. These warlords, such as Genghis Khan and his immediate successors, conquered nearly all of Asia and European Russia. Roving bandits, contrary to the concept of stationary bandits offered by Mancur Olson, extract from region to region and stay mobile. Warlords in Mongolia could be characterized by this title because of the Mongol Empire's lack of definitive borders and consistent expansion and conquest during the 13th and 14th centuries.

=== Vietnam ===
The Twelve Warlords War was a period ranging from 966–968 characterized by chaos and civil war. The reason this period received the title of "Twelve Warlords War", or Anarchy of the 12 Warlords, is because of the struggle for power after the illegitimate succession to the throne by Dương Tam Kha after the death of Ngô Quyền. The ensuing two years were marked by local warlords rebelling in order to seize power within their local governments and challenging the Đường court. As a result, the country fractured into 12 regions, each led by a warlord.

=== Europe ===
Warlordism in Europe is usually connected to various mercenary companies and their chieftains, which often were de facto powerholders in the areas where they resided. Such free companies would arise in a situation when the recognized central power had collapsed, such as in the Great Interregnum in Germany (1254–78), in France during the Hundred Years' War after the Battle of Poitiers, or in the Kingdom of Scotland during the Wars of Scottish Independence.

Free company mercenary captains, such as Sir John Hawkwood, Roger de Flor of Catalan Company or Hugh Calveley, could be considered warlords. Several condottieri in Italy can also be classified as warlords. Ygo Gales Galama was a famous Frisian warlord, and so was his cousin Pier Gerlofs Donia, who was the leader of the Arumer Zwarte Hoop.

The Imperial commanders-in-chief during the reign of Holy Roman Emperor Maximilian I did hold the title Kriegsherr, of which the direct translation was "warlord", but they were not warlords in the sense of the word today. Other warlords could be found in the British Isles during the Middle Ages and up into the Early Modern period; such examples include Brian Boru of Ireland and Guthrum of the Danelaw, who was the commander of the Great Heathen Army and nearly conquered all of England, Alfred of Anglo-Saxon England, first man to unify the Anglo-Saxon kingdoms of Europe, although it would not be completed until Edward the Elder's reign, in which he conquered the last remnants of the Danelaw.

=== Other examples ===
Two prominent examples of modern warlords are Eastern Ukraine's Alexander Zakharchenko and Haiti's Jimmy Chérizier. Other countries and territories with prominent warlords include Iraq, Myanmar (Wa State), the Democratic Republic of the Congo, Chechnya and Dagestan, Libya, Sudan, Somalia, Pakistan (Pashtun Tribal Areas), Syria and Tajikistan (Gorno-Badakhshan).

== See also ==
- Anocracy
- Caudillo
- Daimyo
- Despotism
- Feud
- Plutocracy
- Strongman (politics)
- Violent non-state actor
- List of countries by Failed States Index
- Voivodes of Wallachia, including "voivode" Vlad the Impaler
