= Igo Galama =

Potestaat of Friesland (876–910)

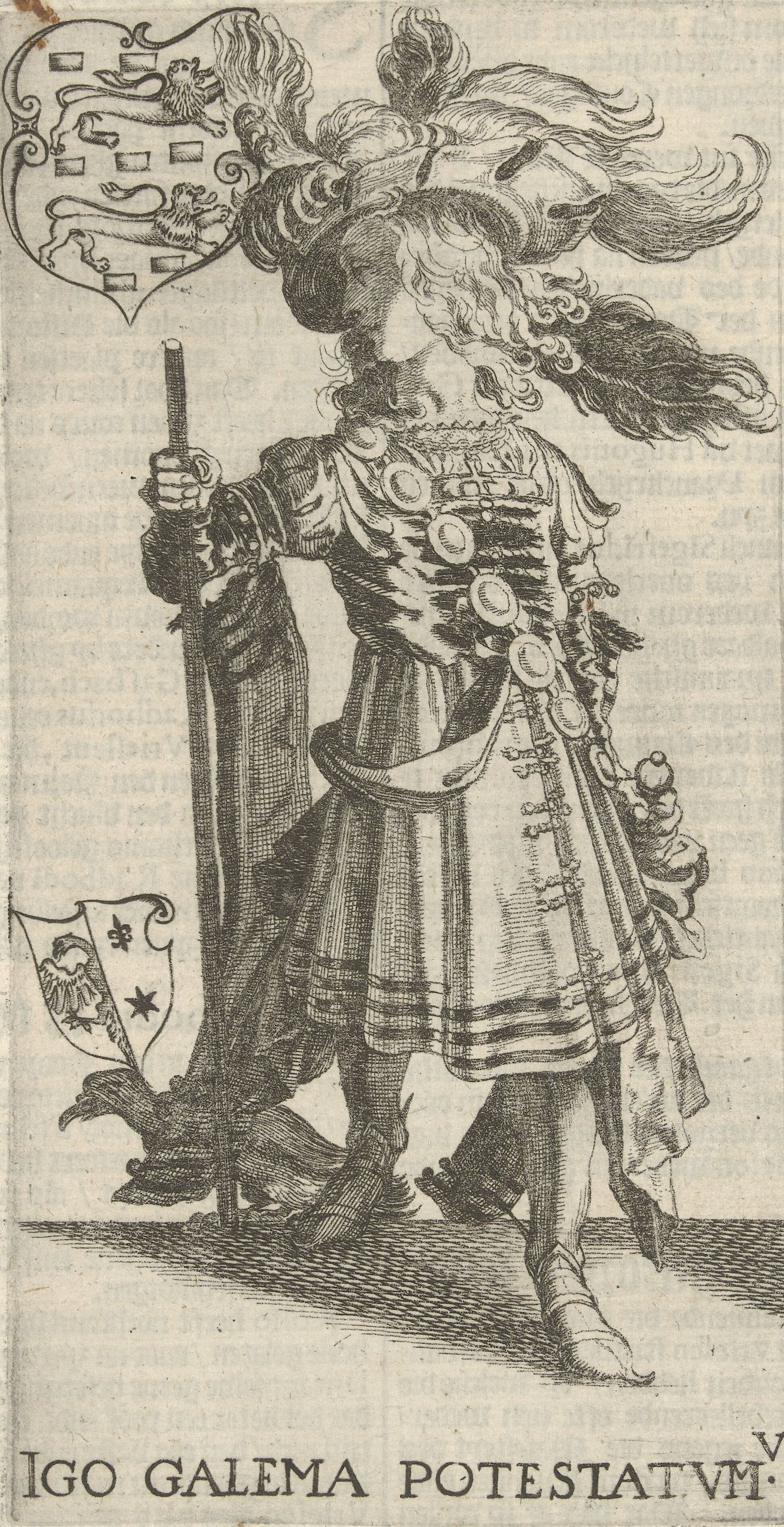
1622 print of Galama

Igo Galama (876–910) was the legendary fifth potestaat of Friesland, now a province of the Netherlands. There is no evidence that he existed.

The history of Friesland says that Galama was elected in 876 as potestaat. He would have been an excellent soldier, who did everything possible for the peace and prosperity of the Frisian people. He also reinforced the seawalls and erected several facilities to inhibit the incursion of the Vikings. The old custom of coastal surveillance, which was neglected by his predecessors, was reintroduced by Galama.

Sometimes, the name of Igo is written as Ygo II Galama, to avoid confusion with Ygo I Galama who would have been the Frisian king Beroald (540–597), and according to the stories won a victory over Dagobert (born 603), the son of the Merovingian king Chlothar II (r. 613–629).

Also Ezonstad would agree Galama residents have particularly to be on their guard against the Vikings. On that occasion, he would have said:

Haadet goede wacht tyan da Nordera oordt, Want vuyt da Grimma herna comt ws all quaed voort. ('He waits at the northerly place, because from this sector comes trouble for us all')

Galama probably died in 910. According to some sources he already died in the first years of his reign.

His coat of arms is seen in the shield of Oudega (town in Gaasterlân-Sleat). It contains a fleur-de-lis and a stins.

He was preceded by Hessel Hermana and succeeded by Gosse Ludigman
