= Saco Reinalda =

Potestaat of Friesland (r. 1150–1167)

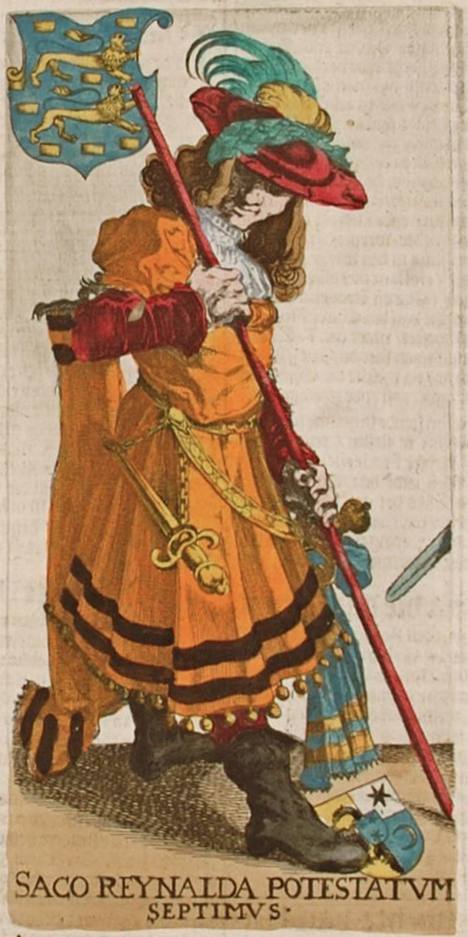
Saco Reinalda as depicted in Chronique ofte Historische geschiedenisse van Vrieslant by Pierius Winsemius published in 1622

Saco Reinalda (chosen from 1150 to 1167) was a legendary potestaat of Friesland, now a province of the Netherlands. Sometimes his name was written as Rengnalda, his son was called Wilco Reinalda.

According to later and inaccurate sources, Saco Reinalda of Westernijtsjerk was twice Potestaat of Friesland, and had the right to save gold and silver coins (0. Sc, 27).
