= Reinier Camminga =

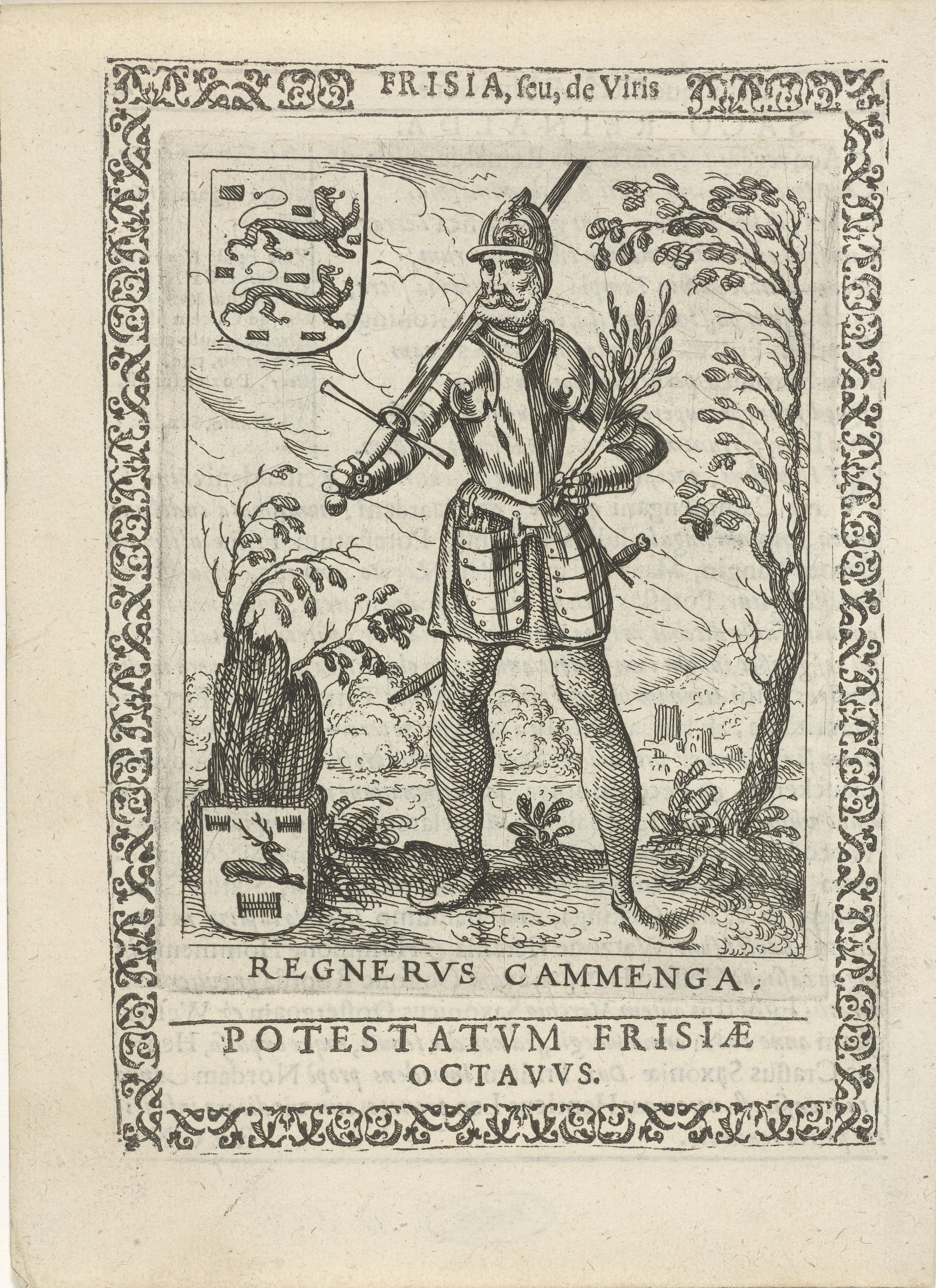

Reinier Camminga (chosen approximately 1300 to 1306) was the ninth potestaat or governor of Friesland now a province of the Netherlands.

Reijner Haijes Camminga was captain when the Danes made an incursion into Oostergo in 1306 because of disputes with the Frisians.

Occo Scarlensis wrote about a drawn-out battle after which the Danes retreated beyond the Lauwers. This battle would have been against Eric VI of Denmark.
