= Juw Dekama =

Potestaat of Friesland (died 1523)

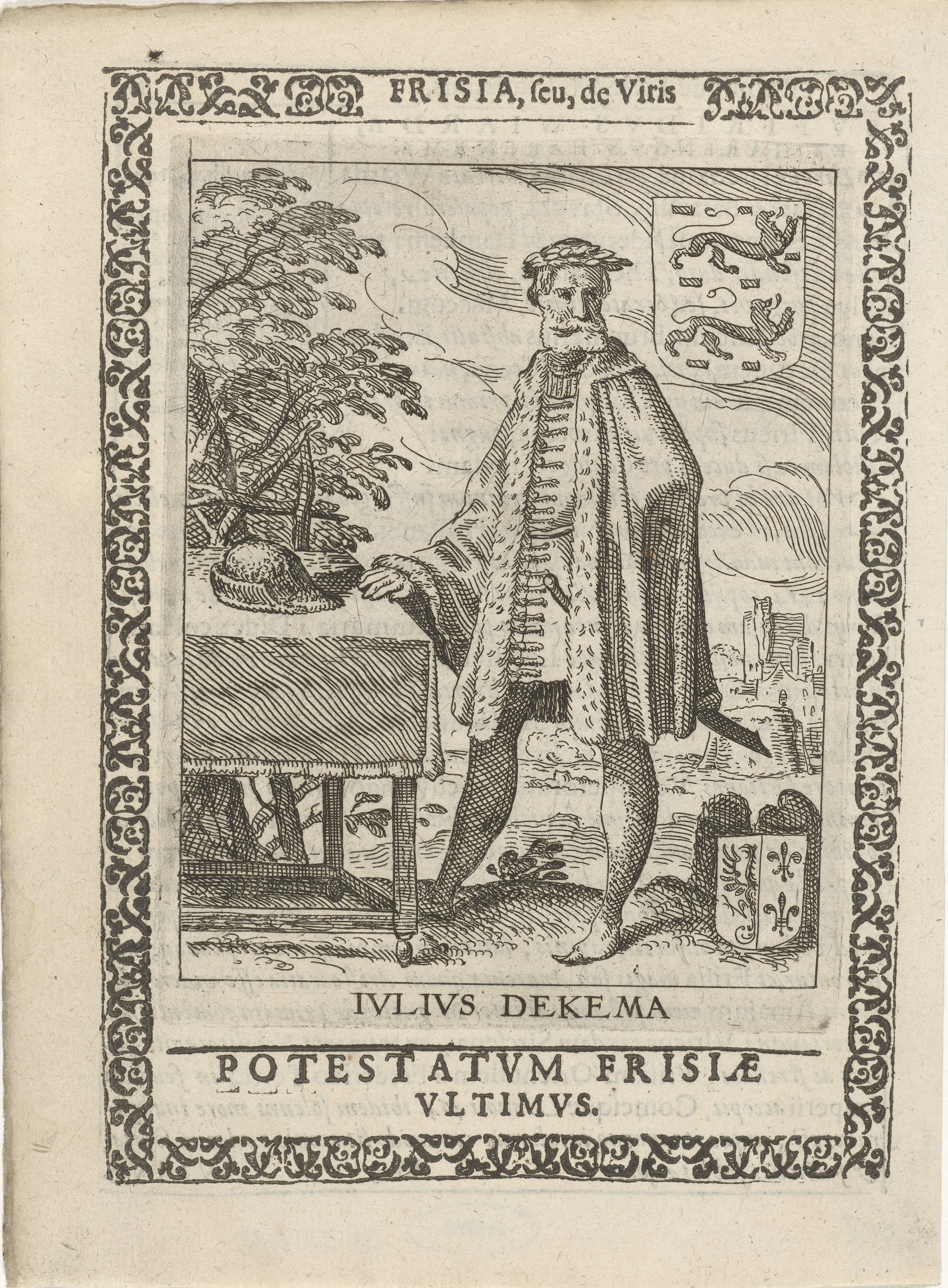
Juw Dekama by Pieter Feddes van Harlingen

Juw Dekema (1449 or 1450 – 24 October 1523) was a Frisian chieftain and Schieringer in Weidum and Baard, who was elected as potestaat of Friesland in 1494 at the diet of Sneek. In 1498 he asked Albrecht of Saxony to rule the land. Juw served as a councilor at the Court of Friesland (1500–1515) and magistrate of Baarderadeel (1510–1512).

== Sources and references ==
- Brouwer, J.H., J.J. Klama, W. Kok, and M. Wiegersma, eds., Encyclopedie van Friesland, (Amsterdam: Elsevier, 1958) s.v. Juw Dekema.
- Vries, O., B.S. Hempenius-van Dijk, P. Nieuwland, and P. Baks. De Heeren van den Raede. Biografieen en Groepsportret van de Raadsheren van het Hof van Friesland, 1499-1811. Hilversum: Uitgeverij Verloren, 1999.
- A.J. Andreae, Nalezing op de Nieuwe Naamlijst van Grietmannen van Jhr. Mr. H. Baerdt van Sminia, Leeuwarden 1893.
- H.B. van Sminia, Juw Hettes Dekema, de laatste Potestaat in Friesland, in: De Vrije Fries VII (1856), pages 257-273.
