= Juw Juwinga =

Frisian potestaat

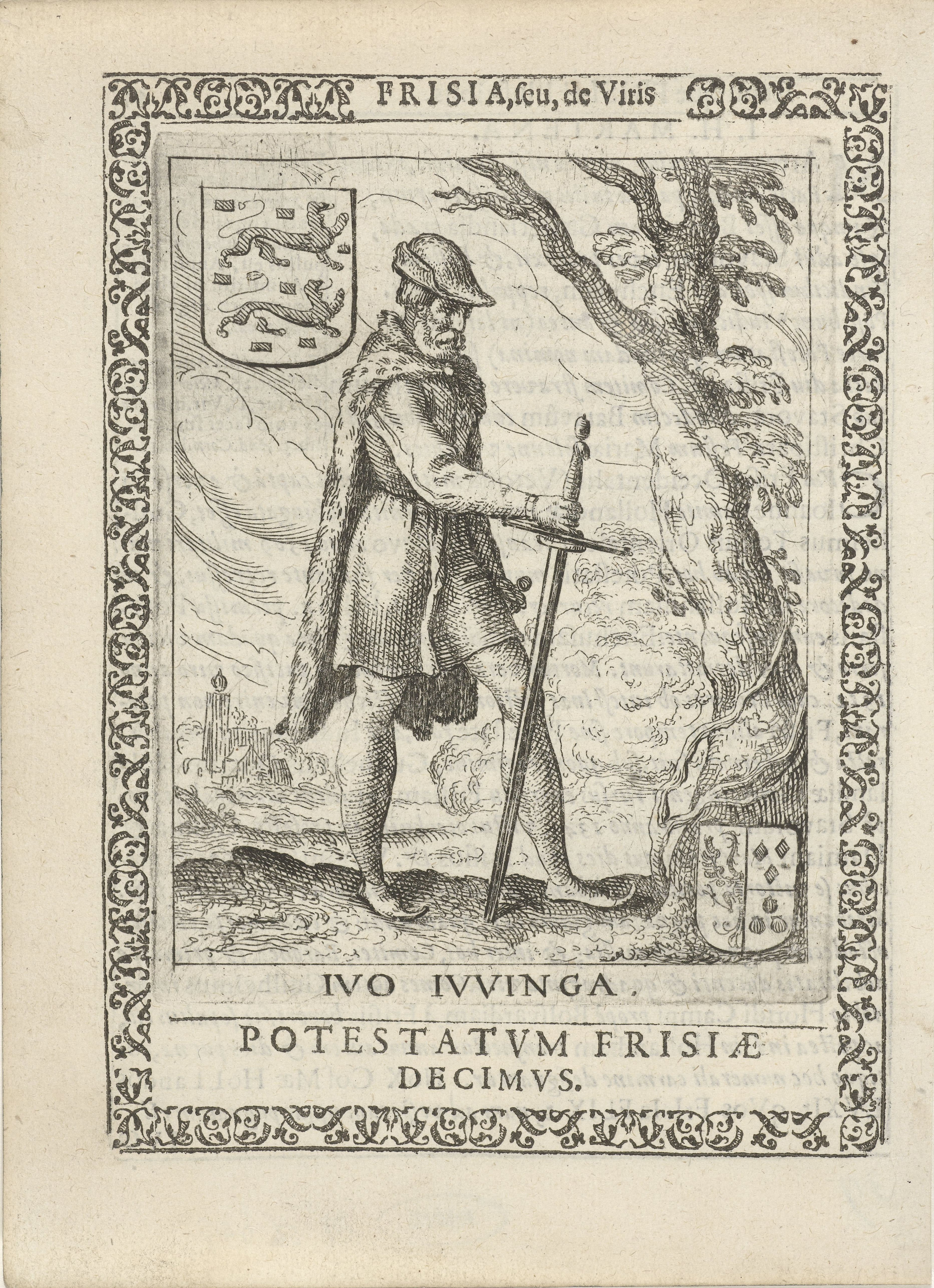
Juw Juwinga by Pieter Feddes van Harlingen

Juw Juwinga (alias Jongema) of Bolsward was a Frisian chieftain who earned fame in the struggle against the Dutch. In 1396, Albrecht of Bavaria, count of Holland, threatened Friesland. To counter this threat, Juwinga was chosen as the eleventh potestate of Friesland, based on his bravery and military experience. Albrecht of Bavaria sent a naval force across the Zuiderzee, and in the ensuing battle at Schoterzijl (in Weststellingwerf) Juwinga was slain, on 29 August 1396. The Dutch forces failed to hold on to the territory, and the land was reclaimed by the Frisians.

Juwinga was also known as Julius Jongema, and Petrus Thaborita wrote his name as Ju Jonghema.
