= Albert III of Saxony =

Duke of Saxony and Margrave of Meissen

Albert III
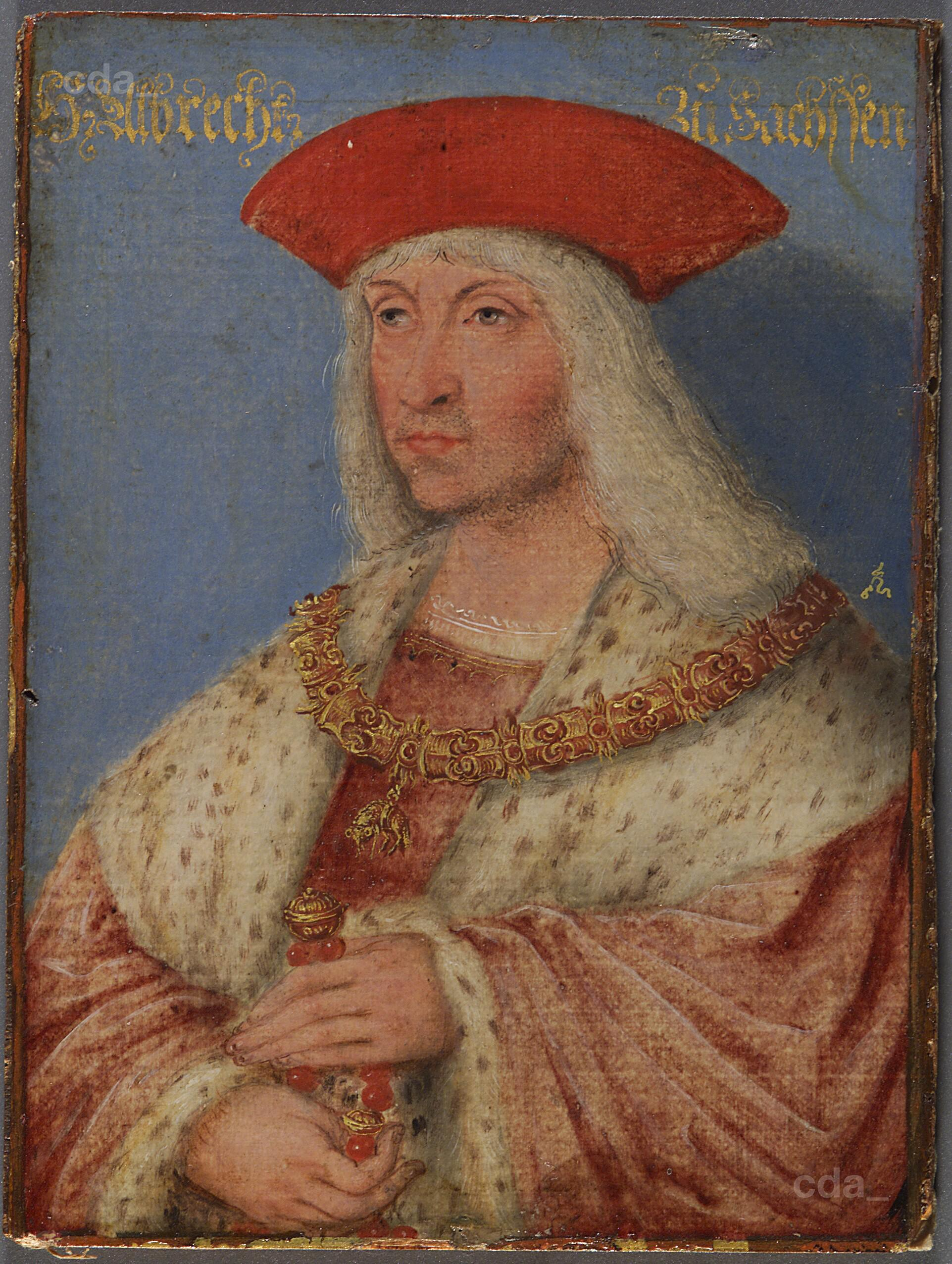
- Portrait by Lucas Cranach the Younger

Duke of Saxony and Margrave of Meissen
- Reign: 7 September 1464 – 12 September 1500
- Predecessor: Frederick II
- Successor: George

Hereditary Governor of Frisia
- Reign: 20 July 1498 – 12 September 1500
- Predecessor: Juw Dekama
- Successor: Henry IV
- Born: 31 July 1443; Grimma, Margravate of Meissen, Holy Roman Empire
- Died: 12 September 1500 (aged 57); Emden, County of East Frisia, Holy Roman Empire
- Burial: Meissen Cathedral
- Spouse: Sidonie of Poděbrady (m. 1464)
- Issue: Catherine, Archduchess of Austria; George, Duke of Saxony; Henry IV, Duke of Saxony; Frederick, Grand Master of the Teutonic Knights
- House: Wettin (Albertine line) (Founder)
- Father: Frederick II, Elector of Saxony
- Mother: Margaret of Austria

Albert III (Latin: Albertus; German: Albrecht) (31 July 1443 – 12 September 1500) was Duke of Saxony from 1464 to 1500. Known as Albert the Bold or Albert the Courageous, he founded the Albertine line of the House of Wettin. Initially, he ruled jointly with his older brother Ernest, Elector of Saxony, but upon division of Wettinian lands by the Treaty of Leipzig (1485), he became a sole ruler in his own domain, known is historiography as the Albertine Duchy of Saxony.

== Biography ==
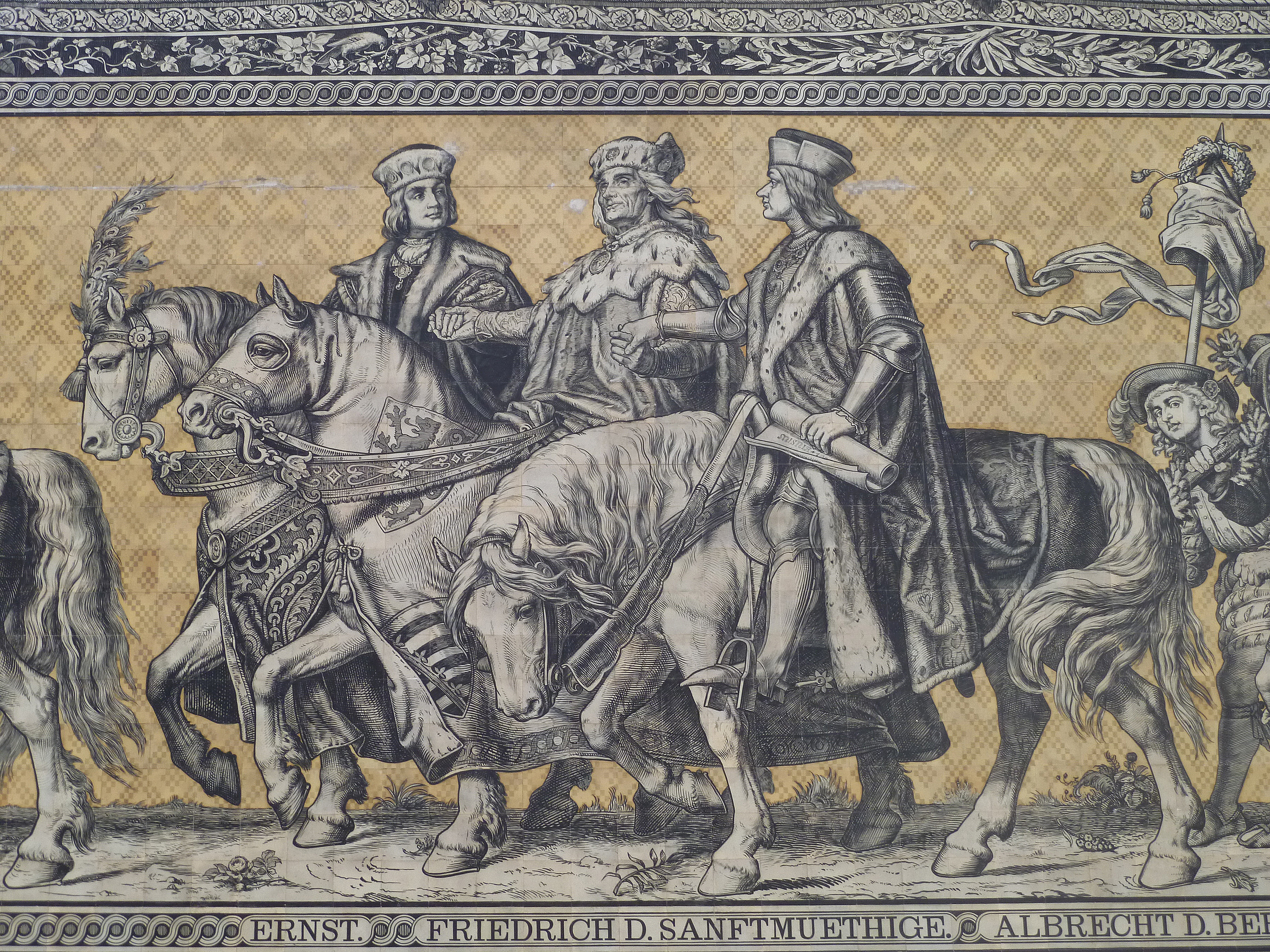
Ernest, Elector of Saxony (1464–1486), Frederick II, Elector of Saxony (1428–1464) and Albert III, Duke of Saxony (1486–1500); from left to right, Fürstenzug, Dresden, Germany

Albert was born in Grimma as the third and youngest son (but fifth child in order of birth) of Frederick II the Gentle, Elector of Saxony, and Margarete of Austria, sister of Frederick III, Holy Roman Emperor. Later, he was a member of the Order of the Golden Fleece.

After escaping from the hands of Kunz von Kaufungen, who had abducted him together with his brother Ernest, he spent some time at the court of the emperor Frederick III in Vienna.

In Eger (Cheb) on 11 November 1464 Albert married Zdenka (Sidonie), daughter of George of Podebrady, King of Bohemia; but failed to obtain the Bohemian Crown on the death of George in 1471. After the death of his father in 1464, Albert and Ernest ruled their lands together, but in 1485 a division was made by the Treaty of Leipzig, and Albert received the Meissen area, together with northern parts of Thuringia and some adjoining districts, and founded the Albertine branch of the House of Wettin.

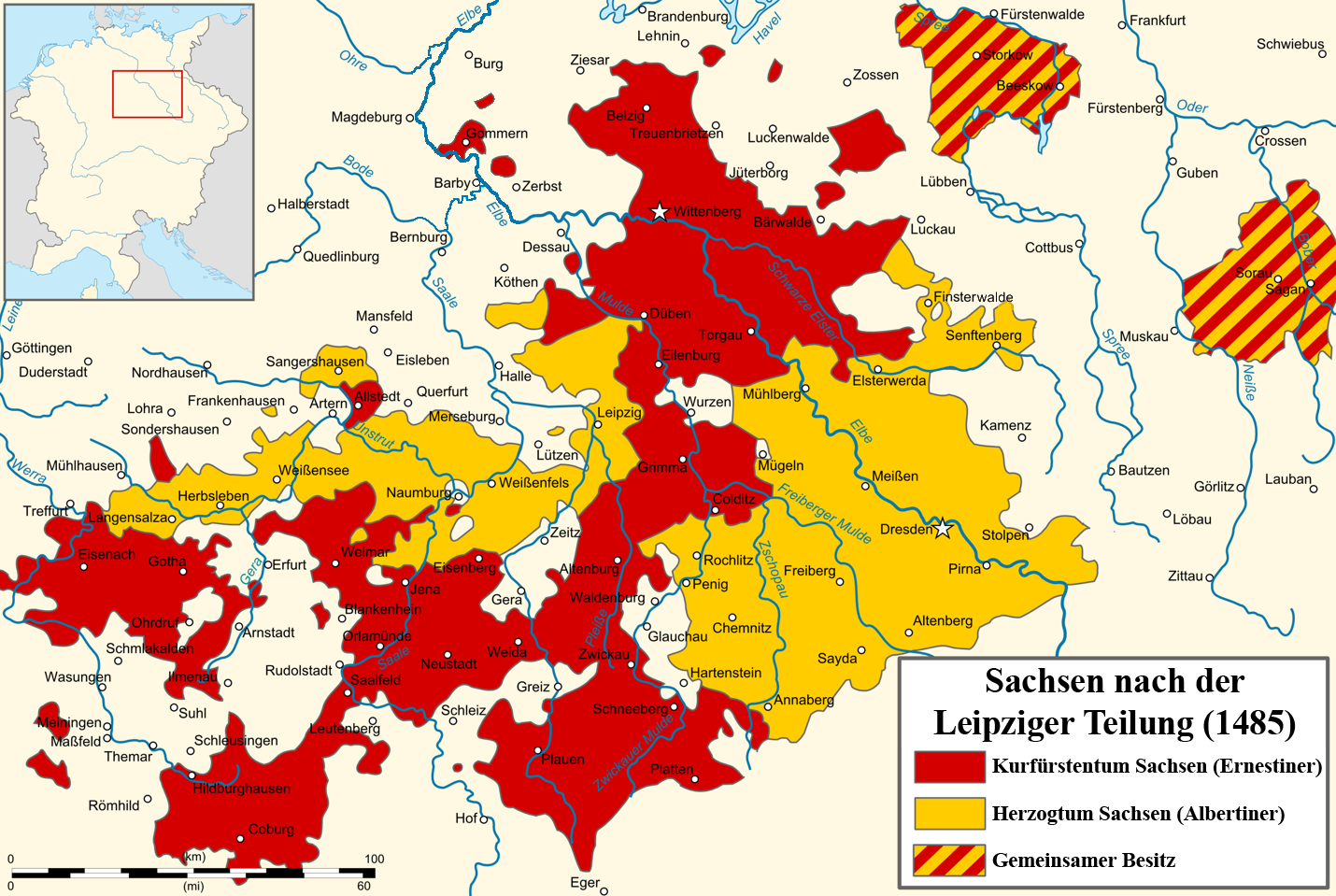
Wettinian domains, Albertine (yellow) and Ernestine (red), upon the Treaty of Leipzig (1485)

Regarded as a capable soldier by the emperor, Albert (in 1475) took a prominent part in the campaign against Charles the Bold, Duke of Burgundy, and in 1487 led an expedition against Matthias Corvinus, King of Hungary, which failed owing to lack of support on the part of the emperor.

From 1477 a new conflict arose with king Matthias Corvinus of Hungary who started to invade the Austrian Habsburg lands. The conflict is known as the Austrian–Hungarian War (1477–1488). The Kaiser did not succeed in persuading the German electors and other imperial estates to provide military assistance. In the spring of 1483 Frederick fled Vienna to the safe city of Wiener Neustadt, in 1485 Corvinus was able to conquer Vienna and had himself called “ Archduke of Austria ” (Dux Austriae). In August 1487, the Hungarians succeeded in taking Wiener Neustadt, the new imperial residence in eastern Lower Austria. Friedrich first had to flee to Graz and temporarily flee to Linz in Upper Austria. After the imperial war against Hungary had been decided at the Nuremberg Diet in 1487, Duke Albert was appointed as the supreme commander of the entire imperial army. He was supposed to oppose Matthias' famous standing professional army, the Black Army of Hungary. After the Hungarian occupation of Vienna, Albrecht's task was to reconquer the lost Austrian territories. However, this failed due to the poor equipment of his army, so he had to wage a difficult defensive war under adverse circumstances. Duke Albrecht knew that no decisive help was to be expected from the Reich in the near future, but that the situation in the hereditary lands would deteriorate visibly. On 17 November 1487, Duke Albrecht informed Emperor Frederick that, under the ongoing military situation in his hereditary lands, a compromise with the King of Hungary would be the only rational solution.

The war came to an end with an armistice in 1488, although the Habsburgs rankled with the peace. At the beginning of December, Matthias Corvinus met with Albrecht of Saxony in Markersdorf an der Pielach, a little later an armistice was reached in St. Pölten on 6 December, which was extended several times until the death of the Hungarian king.

In 1488 he was appointed Governor of the Netherlands (until 1493) and marched with the imperial forces to free the Roman king Maximilian from his imprisonment at Bruges, and when, in 1489, the King returned to Germany, Albert was left as his representative to prosecute the war against the rebels. He was successful in restoring the authority of Maximilian in Holland, Flanders, and Brabant, but failed to obtain any repayment of the large sums of money which he had spent in these campaigns.

His services were rewarded in 1498 when Maximilian bestowed upon him the title of Hereditary Governor (potestat) of Friesland, but he had to make good his claim by force of arms. He had to a great extent succeeded, and was paying a visit to Saxony, when he was recalled by news of a fresh rising. The duke recaptured Groningen, but soon afterwards he died at Emden. He was buried at Meissen.

Albert, who was a man of great strength and considerable skill in feats of arms, delighted in tournaments and knightly exercises. His loyalty to the emperor Frederick, and the expenses incurred in this connection, aroused some irritation among his subjects, but his rule was a period of prosperity in Saxony.

== Family and children ==
With his wife Sidonie, Albrecht had nine children:

1. Katharina (Meissen, 24 July 1468 – Göttingen, 10 February 1524), married firstly on 24 February 1484 in Innsbruck to Duke Sigismund of Austria, and secondly on 1497 to Duke Eric I of Brunswick-Calenberg.
2. Georg "der Bärtige" (Meissen, 27 August 1471 – Dresden, 17 April 1539).
3. Heinrich V "der Fromme" (Dresden, 16 March 1473 – Dresden, 18 August 1541).
4. Frederick (Torgau, 26 October 1473 – Rochlitz, 14 December 1510), Grand Master of the Teutonic Knights.
5. Anna (Dresden, 3 August 1478 – Dresden, 1479).
6. Stillborn child (1479).
7. Louis (Torgau, 28 September 1481 – Torgau?, some days later / Torgau?, young after 1498) [?].
8. John (born and died Torgau, 24 June 1484).
9. John (Torgau, 2 December 1498 – Torgau?, some days later / Torgau?, young in September of the same year as his brother Louis) [?].

== Sources ==
- Blaschke, Karlheinz (2002). "Die Leipziger Teilung der wettinischen Länder von 1485". Beiträge zur Verfassungs- und Verwaltungsgeschichte Sachsens: Ausgewählte Aufsätze von Karlheinz Blaschke. Leipzig: Leipziger Universitätsverlag. pp. 323–335.
- Groß, Reiner (2007). Die Wettiner. Stuttgart: Kohlhammer Verlag.
- Tebruck, Stefan (2005). "Zwischen Integration und Selbstbehauptung: Thüringen im wettinischen Herrschaftsbereich". Fragen der politischen Integration im mittelalterlichen Europa. Ostfildern: Jan Thorbecke Verlag. pp. 375–412, 589–591.
- Wilson, Peter H. (2016). Heart of Europe: A History of the Holy Roman Empire. Cambridge: Harvard University Press.

Albert III of Saxony House of Wettin Born: 27 January 1443 Died: 12 September 1500
Regnal titles
Preceded by Frederick II	Duke of Saxony and Margrave of Meissen; 1464–1500	Succeeded by George
Government offices
Vacant Direct rule of Maximilian I Title last held by Engelbert II of Nassau	Governor of the Habsburg Netherlands; 1488 to 1492	Vacant Direct rule of Philip the Handsome Title next held by Engelbert II of Nassau
