= Westergoa =

Historical region in Friesland

Westergoa was one of the Seven Sealands and one of the three that now lie within the borders of today's Dutch province of Friesland. Later it was one of the three goaen of Frisia. In the Middle Ages Westergoa most probably formed the political centre of the Frisian realm.

== Area ==
On the eastern side Westergoa was bordered by the Middelsee, on the other side Eastergoa. On the south side it bordered with what originally was Bornegoa which was in the line with Terhernster Lake to the south of the coast, the eastern perimeter was with Doedingwerstal. All other borders were coastlines.

== 1200 ==
Around 1200, Westergoa was divided into parts within the Westergoa area Franeker, Wildinge and Wymbrits, called the Fiefdielen (Five parts). Franeker and Wildinge have probably been the original Westergo. Wymbrits was added when begin 12th century when Sudergoa was merged into Westergoa.

== 1500 ==
Around 1500 Het Bildt, was added to Westergoa but by the establishment of Sânwâlden, Gaasterland, Doniawerstal and Lemsterland these parts in the south of Westergoa were lost. Also eight cities grew exceptionally in the Westergoa area; Harlingen and Franeker in the Fiefdielen part, Bolsward at the eastern side of Wildinge, now Wûnseradiel and at the southern point Workum and Hindeloopen. The rest of Wymbrits fell into three cities and six parts. Stavoren, Sneek and IJlst had become autonomous cities but six Frisian slots formed the grietenijen of Wymbritseradeel and Hemelumer Oldeferd (and Noardwâlde).

The nine 'grietenijen' of Westergo
1	Menaldumadeel
2	Franekeradeel
3	Barradeel
4	Baarderadeel
5	Hinnaarderadeel
6	Wûnseradeel
7	Wymbritseradeel
8	Himmelumer Aldefurd
9	Het Bildt

Eight Cities:
Ha	Harlingen
F	Franeker
B	Bolsward
Sn	Sneek
Dr	IJlst
W	Workum
Hy	Hindeloopen
St	Stavoren
