= Pieter Feddes van Harlingen =

Dutch painter

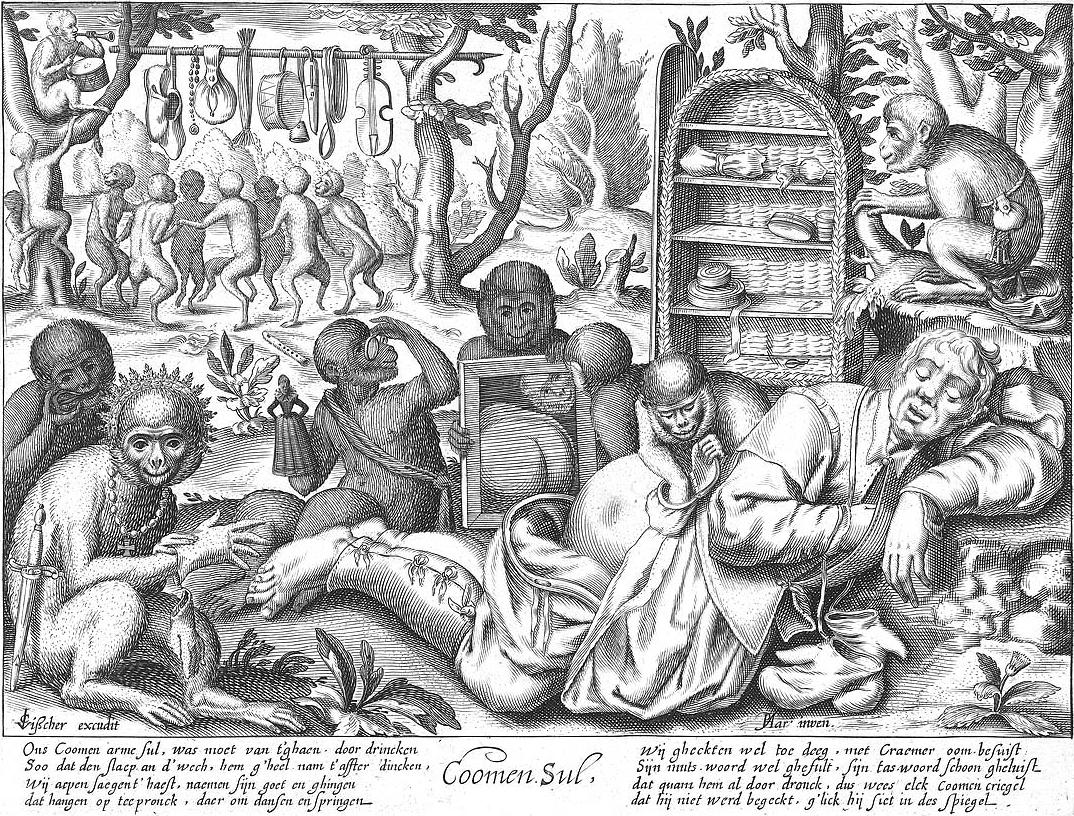
- 'The drunken merchant by Pieter Feddes and Claes Jansz. Visscher
- Born: Pieter; 1586; Harlingen
- Died: 1623 (aged 36–37); Leeuwarden
- Known for: Painting, Engraving
- Movement: Baroque

Pieter Feddes van Harlingen (1586–1623), was a Dutch Golden Age painter.

== Biography ==
According to Houbraken, who only saw his etchings, he signed his name P. Harlingensis. In 1612 he left Harlingen for Leeuwarden. He influenced Jacob Adriaensz Backer.
