= Vetkopers and Schieringers =

Medieval Frisian political factions

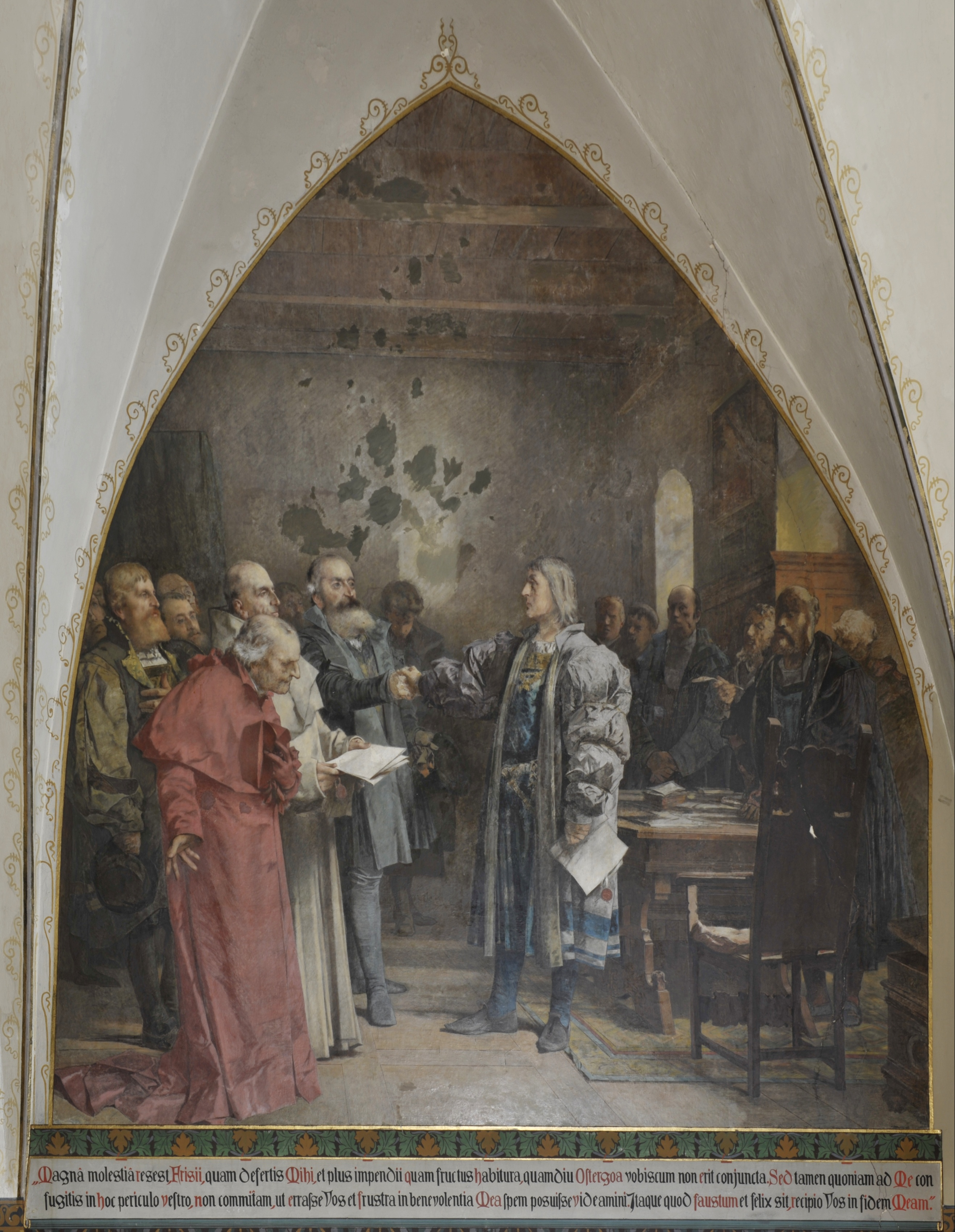
Skieringers in Medemblik asking Albrecht the duke of Saxony for protection, March 1498, by Julius Scholz (1825–1893), Albrechtsburg Meissen (Museum), Germany

The Vetkopers and Schieringers (West Frisian: Fetkeapers en Skieringers) were two opposing Frisian factional parties from the medieval period. They were responsible for a civil war that lasted for over a century (1350–1498) and which eventually led to the end of the so-called "Frisian freedom".

These factional parties arose because of an economic downturn that began in Friesland in the mid-14th century. Accompanied by a decline in monasteries and other communal institutions, social discord led to the emergence of Frisian nobility, who were called haadlingen in East Friesland (headmen) and hoofdelingen in West Friesland. Hoofdelingen were Dutch nobility; they were wealthy landowners who possessed fortified stone houses and a surrounding farming estate (stins and state). The hoofdelingen were farmers who worked for their wealth and status by acquiring farmland and consolidated their positions by holding important local administrative and judicial roles (such as that of grietman).

Frisian politics was largely decentralized at the time. Officially, Friesland had a communal government structure with a central board called the Recht en Raad, which was populated by 30 rural grietmen and 11 city mayors. The real rule, however, was exercised at the local level, in the grietenij, the city, and even in the village. The grietman, which was officially a democratically elected official, were predominantly sourced from the hoofdelingen class. This was because the Hoofdelingen were able to offer military protection to the local inhabitants that lived under the influence of their stins.

From the 1480s it was a common practice that the hoofdelingen nobility established a core militia composed of a few permanent men-at-arms and a few permanent mercenaries, along with an auxiliary force of several hundred inhabitants from the town, city, grietenij or collection of villages over which they held influence. The auxiliary force was formed by huislieden (plural of huisman), which means that they were common people who owned a house, be it as a freeholder or a tenant.

Feuds between hoofdelingen eventually consolidated in aligning along two opposing parties: the Skieringers and the Fetkeapers.

The Schieringer party was led by major hoofdelingen such as the traditional families Harinxma, Sjaerda, Martena, Camstra and Camminga. The Schieringers sought alliances with monarchs such as the Maximilian I of Austria, and his general Albrecht III, Duke of Saxony. The Vetkoper party consisted of a large number of minor hoofdelingen, who were supported by common freehold farmers from the peat areas. The Vetkopers supported self government.

A contemporary Frisian nobleman Jancko Douwama (1482–1533), wrote in his memoirs, titled the Boeck der Partijen ("Book of the Parties") about the origins of the discord between the warring parties in Friesland and his definition of the terms Skieringers and Fetkeapers. According to Jancko the Fetkopers (pronounced [ˈfɛtkoːpərs]; "fat-buyers") were so called because they had much and could buy fat products. The poor adopted the name Skieringers (pronounced [ˈskiːrɪŋərs]; "speakers") because they had tried firstly discussion rather than violence.

In the second half of the fifteenth century the Fetkeaper town of Groningen, which had become the dominating force in Frisia, tried to interfere in Mid-Frisian affairs. The meddling met strong opposition in Skieringer held Westergo and ended in a call for foreign help.

The use of trained foot-soldier mercenaries known as Landsknechte by both the Schieringer and Vetkoper parties played a significant role in the intensification of conflicts towards the end of the 1400s. The availability of these mercenaries increased following the death of Charles the Bold in 1477, and the consequent unrest in various regions, such as the Burgundian Netherlands, the prince-bishopric of Utrecht, and the Duchy of Guelders, especially during times of war. The use of these highly trained mercenaries by both Schieringer and the Vetkoper factions in Friesland led to more extensive and violent conflicts. These Landsknechte would offer their services in fixed groups for several weeks or months to anyone willing to pay their wages. Their wages could only be raised by imposing heavy taxes on the cities and grietenijen. Their presence resulted in further destabilization since the Landsknechte would turn rogue if their wages were not paid, leading them to pillage and set fire to the surrounding areas.

Albrecht III, the Duke of Saxony, used the Landsknechte to destabilize Friesland in a cunning manner. In 1496, he used these hired mercenaries to aid the Schieringers in driving out the Groninger and Vetkoper alliance from Westergo. Afterwards, he lent some Landsknechte mercenaries to the Vetkoper, Tjerk Walta, for two reasons: to relieve himself the burden of paying their wages and to cause further instability. This interference was successful to the point where the Schieringer hoofdelingen felt so trapped that they had no choice but to request the Duke's protection on 21 March 1498. Of course the hired Landsknechte of Tjerk Walta did not want to fight their own, those who were under the command of Albrecht III, so they simply returned to Saxon service under the Duke. By the end of April 1498, the Groninger-Vetkoper alliance was shattered, with the Groningers being forced to enter into a humiliating agreement. The most significant provision of this agreement was that they would pay the Landsknechte mercenaries 30,000 Rhine guilders and, in doing so, relinquish their rights to Westergo and Oostergo to Albrecht, the Duke of Saxony. However weakened, Gronigen femained free from Saxon defeat for the time being.

Albrecht III next focussed on the Schieringers. Albrecht, now known for his impressive military skills and with the support of his highly trained Landsknechte mercenaries, gathered his army near Laaxum in June 1498 to defeat the Schieringers once and for all. The Schieringer forces were made up of local Frisian militia headed by hoofdelingen, and they were no match for the well-equipped German army led by Albrecht. This was not necessarily due to the Frisian militia's lack of fighting spirit, but rather due to their lack of organized leadership, military training and armaments, resulting in a disorganized and poorly coordinated attack. As a result of the Battle at Laaxum on 10 June 1498, the Frisian Freedom came to an end.

Emperor Maximilian of Habsburg appointed Albrecht hereditary potestate and gubernator of Friesland in 1499. By 1500, his son Henry IV, Duke of Saxony, inherited the Lordship of Friesland. Henry IV circulated letters of bidding to the Schieringer hoofdelingen to implement harsh new taxes under an extremely short timeline, with severe consequences, in order to raise money. In a very short time, the occupation by the Duke and his Landsknecht military force became unacceptable to many Frisians and there were a significant number of revolts.

Although the Schieringers and Vetkopers united with support of the Duke of Gelderland against Henry IV and the Saxon Landsknecht army, they were unable to regain their old freedoms. In an effort to prevent weapons from being used against them in the future, the Saxons attempted to forbid or severely limit the possession of weapons among the Frisian people. There was too much of a long-standing tradition of communal self-defence by the local grietenij militias. Significant local resistance remained and they were unable to achieve a complete disarmament of the local grietenij militias. The reign of the dukes of Saxony lasted from 1498 to 1515.

On 19 May 1515 George, Duke of Saxony sold Groningen and Friesland to Emperor Charles V, for 100,000 Dutch florins. Like the rest of the Netherlands and an even larger part of Europe, Friesland was under the rule of the House of Habsburg. However, Friesland remained in a civil war, for some time, at least up until 1523.

In the years 1516 to 1517, a significant number of confiscations were recorded that involved the forced transfer of property from the Vetkoper-supporting families in Friesland to non-Frisian nobility. It seems that the Burgundian government used these confiscations to reward their own loyal Schieringer supporters with property in Friesland. Among the beneficiaries, we see many individuals who were notably affluent in 1511. It appears that these confiscations contributed to a discernible shift of wealth from Frisians to non-Frisians, and from the less wealthy to the affluent.

Saxon subjugation ended Frisian municipal independence. Although still spoken at the time, the Frisian language did not have any official status. Frisian languages would disappear from the official written record; the last official document recorded in Frisian was in 1573. Frisian was replaced by Dutch and would not return until about 1800.

== See also ==
- Factionalism in the medieval Low Countries
