= Arum (disambiguation) =

Arum is a plant genus.

Arum may also refer to:

== Places ==
- Arum, Armenia
- Arum, Netherlands
- Årum, Fredrikstad municipality, Norway

== Surname or given name ==
- Ah-reum, also spelled Arŭm, Korean given name (including a list of people with the name)
- Bob Arum (born 1931), American lawyer and businessman; founder of boxing promotion company Top Rank
- Richard Arum (born 1963), American sociology professor
- Arum (Vala), one of the Valar in J. R. R. Tolkien's legendarium

== Other uses ==
- Araceae, a family of plants called the "arum family"

== See also ==
- Erum (disambiguation)
