= Marne (estuary) =

Former Estuary

Coordinates: 53°07.5′N 5°26′E

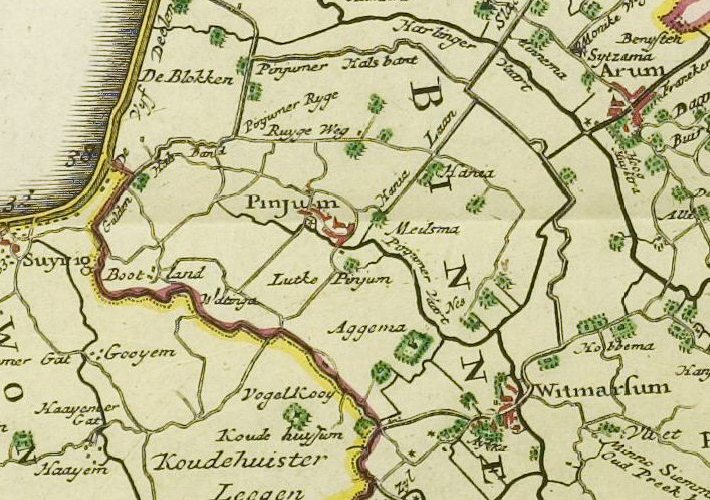
The Pingjumer Gulden Halsband, reclaiming part of the Marne

The Marneslenk (Dutch), or Marneslinke (Frisian), or Marne estuary, was a former estuary in western Friesland south of Harlingen, now reclaimed to be farmland. It formed around the year 300 AD, when rising sea levels also enlarged the Almere lake to the southwest, and formed the Middelzee to the east. The Marneslenk had its mouth on the Vlie and stretched southeasterly to the area of Tirns and then headed east to the Middelzee. Between 1100 and 1300 AD the watercourse was reclaimed and turned into fields by the construction of dykes. One such dyke is the Pingjumer Gulden Halsband. The Bedelaarsvaart (Bidlersfeart) and Harnzerfeartis are what remains of this watercourse nowadays.

== Pre-history ==
In the Pleistocene the Marneslenk existed as a landscape low oriented to the northwest between the Harlingen High to the north east and the Texel high to the southwest. In the northwest end it broadened out between what is now Vlieland and Terschelling It connected at its southeast extremity to the north-south oriented Boorne Valley. By 11,000 years ago with low sea level Marneslenk had become a river. The Boorne valley had become the Boorneslenk (tidal estuary). In the Holocene, sea level rose and the area became covered in sand, clay and peat. Around 3000 BC the area was a salt marsh. Around 600 BC Iron Age humans colonised the area. By 100 BC the Roman Empire occupied the area and terps at Pingjum and Witmarsum to the south, Kimswerd and Arum to the north of the estuary were established. Around this time, the southeast end of Marneslenk connected to the southernmost part of the Middelzee, separating an island, Westergo, from the continent. Around 300 AD there was significant sea level rise and clay was deposited on top of peat. Areas around the Vlie were flooded. Between 300 and 400 AD many settlements were abandoned. By 800 AD the coast line was somewhat similar to that today, except that Marneslenk was extending inland, with tidal flats and a water channel. The Middelzee had expanded and had a tidal watershed with the Marne.

== Poldering ==
Between 900 and 1000 AD a salt marsh levee existed on the north side of Marneslenk. Levees formed banks around salt marshes and channels, when the highest possible tides flooded the area and deposited sediment preferentially. The region of the Marne, Westergo, was the first place in the world to build dykes and polders. One of the first four polders, a "mother polder" was built by enclosing an area of land with dykes. This polder was the Witmarsum-Hartwerd Polder positioned to the south east of Marneslenk, extending to the Middelzee. It left Witmarsum on the edge of the polder adjacent to the south west branch of the Marne.

Dykes were built on the levees surrounding the Marne. On the south side they were starting from the Zuider Zee, the first being Sânwei (Zandweg), then Penjumer Rige (now called Riegeweg), to Mania, then Nesserleane heading east-southeast. Then heading down in the southwest direction around De Nes the dyke passed farms Middema, Aggema, where the Penjumerfeart flowed into the Marne, then on past De Kampen. 600 meters further on at Kathuzum (Koudehuizum) the head of the Marne was closed off at a sluice gate. Then on the south east side of the Marne, the dyke, part of the Witmarsum-Hartwerd Polder, headed northeast past Gerns, and at Witmarsum, and Aldrij a slice gate drained the polder. This side was 3 km long. At Grouwe Kat the arm connecting to the Middelzee branched off to the southeast. The northern shore of the Marne heads north west from Grouwe Kat, to Arum, and then west-northwest to Kimswerd.

Around 1000 AD the Marne estuary was partly reclaimed by building a dyke out to the north of Pingjum, which was part of a dyke system totally surrounding Pingjum,. This was named Penjumer Gouden Halsbân. The dyke extended north from Govertsterp, parallel but east of De Blokken. It abutted the Griene Dyk that reached the coast at Dijksterbuorren. It then headed east until it met the Marnedijk (now called Groene Dijk) adjacent to some fields called De Wiken. The Marnedyk headed southeast (now called Schutedijk), and then cut off the arm of the Marne as it connected to the southeast shore north of Witmarsum. The remains of the Marne river to the north of this new dyke, is called the Harnzer Feart. It was crossed by the Marnedyk with a sluice gate, the Kimswerter syl. This stream was diverted north to Harlingen, and the remanent heading to the coast was called Bidlersfeart. Bidlersfeart was crossed by the Griene Dyk at a sluice gate called Bantumer syl. Each year on the 27 December the land on the new dykes was rented out at a party held at the church in Pingjum.

The rest of the Marne estuary was reclaimed by the year 1200 AD. The effect on the people living there was that transport was no longer over open seawater, but instead on inland waterways. Instead of being confined to living on the artificial hills (terps), villages could be built on flat land. Dairy farming became possible.

== Future ==
The future of the area is likely to be affected by further sea level rise and reduced availability of fresh water. This is likely to result in salinisation of the ground near the Wadden Sea.

== Place names ==
Place names in the area of Marneslenk often end in -um, which was earlier -hem or -heem meaning "home", and when attached to a name, meant "house of ...".

prefix	suffix	date	early name	current name
Alder	hem	1275	Aldenem	Arum
Goaije	hem	1533	Goyum	Gooium
	werth			Kimswerd
Penne	hem	1400	Peinimghem	Pingjum
Widmar	hem	1456	Withmarsum	Witmarsum

== Extra reading ==
- Rienks & Walther, 1954, Binnendiken en slaperdiken yn Fryslân, deel 2, p. 117 has a map titled "Penjumer Halsban" de aldste wetterkearing ein 10e ieu
