= Kimswerd =

Kimswerd Kimswert
- Village
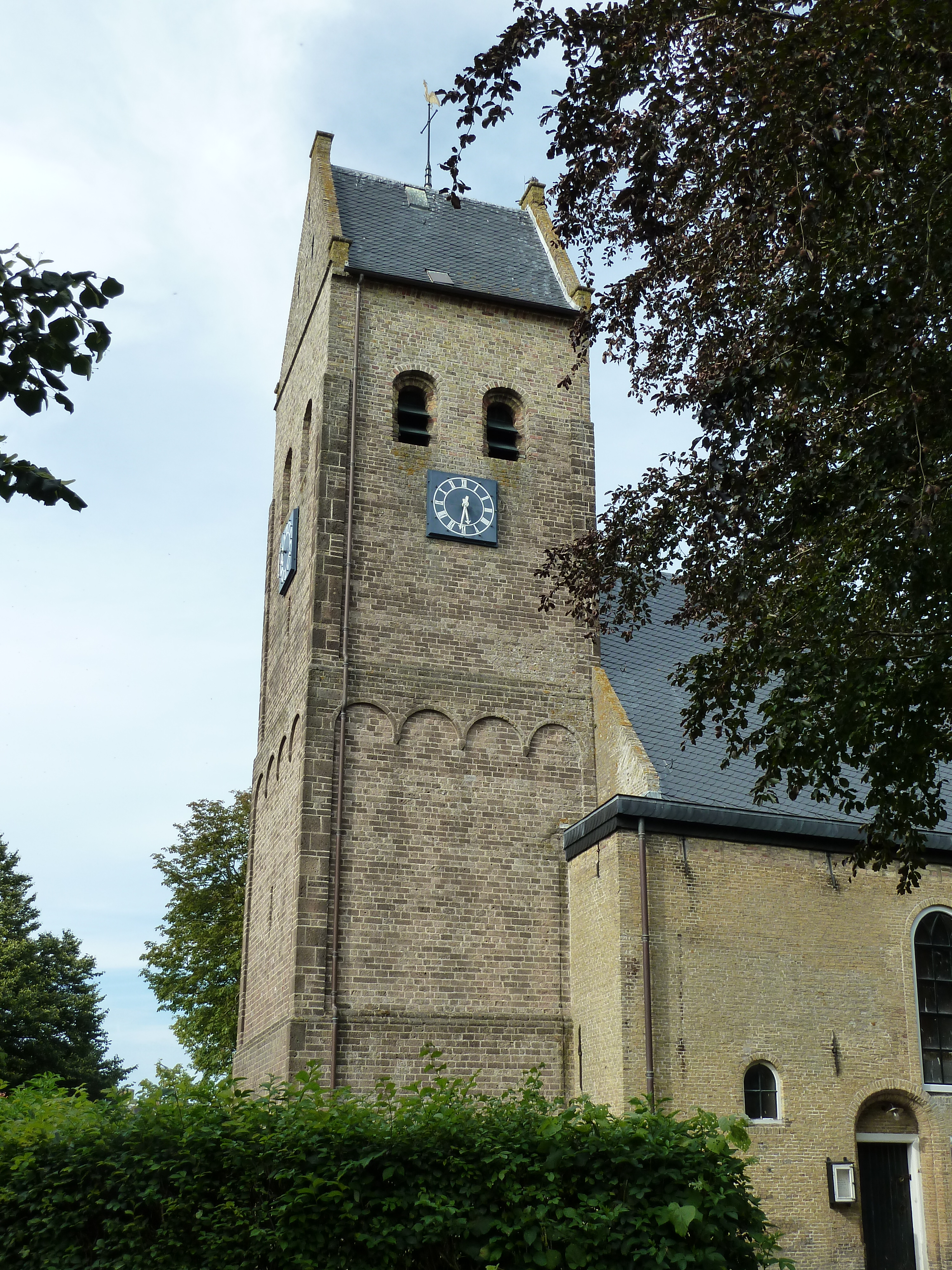
- St Lawrence church

- Flag Coat of arms

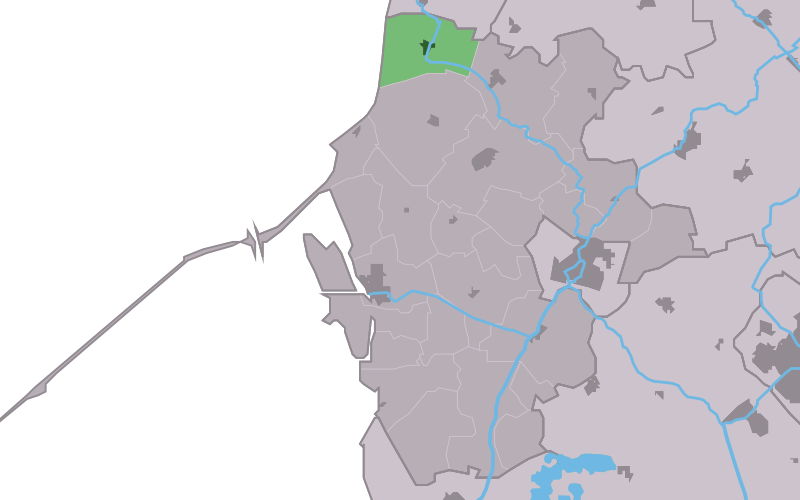
- Location in the former Wûnseradiel municipality

- Location in the Netherlands Kimswerd (Netherlands)
- Country: Netherlands
- Province: Friesland
- Municipality: Súdwest-Fryslân

Area
  - Total: 7.98 km^{2} (3.08 sq mi)
- Elevation: 0.3 m (0.98 ft)

Population (2021)
  - Total: 540
  - Density: 68/km^{2} (180/sq mi)
- Time zone: UTC+1 (CET)
  - Summer (DST): UTC+2 (CEST)
- Postal code: 8821
- Dialing code: 0517

Kimswerd (West Frisian: Kimswert) is a village in Súdwest-Fryslân municipality in the province of Friesland, the Netherlands. It had a population of around 565 in January 2017.

== History ==
The village was first mentioned in the 13th century as Kemmerswerth, and means "terp village of Kemme (person). Kimswerd is a terp (artificial living hill) village. Archaeological finds have been discovered in the terp from the Roman era. The village used to have a grid structure and was located along the former Marneslenk, a bay in the Wadden Sea. Around 1850, the road from Bolsward to Harlingen was paved, and the village extended towards the road.

The Dutch Reformed church dates from the 11th century, and has a tower from the 12th century. It was modified and extended many times during its history.

On 29 January 1515, Kimswerd was plundered by Saxon mercenaries hired by the Count of Holland to conquer Friesland. Pier Gerlofs Donia who lost his wife and one of his two children swore revenge, and founded the Arumer Zwarte Hoop, a guerrilla army which plundered and raided cities in Holland.

Kimswerd was home to 408 people in 1840. Before 2011, the village was part of the Wûnseradiel municipality.

== Notable people ==
- Pier Gerlofs Donia, nicknamed Grutte Pier, a legendary freedom fighter born around 1480, who led a guerrilla war against the occupying forces after his wife and one of his two children were killed, and burnt his farm in 1515. He led the Frisian rebel army, the Arumer Zwarte Hoop from 1515 until 1519.

== Gallery ==
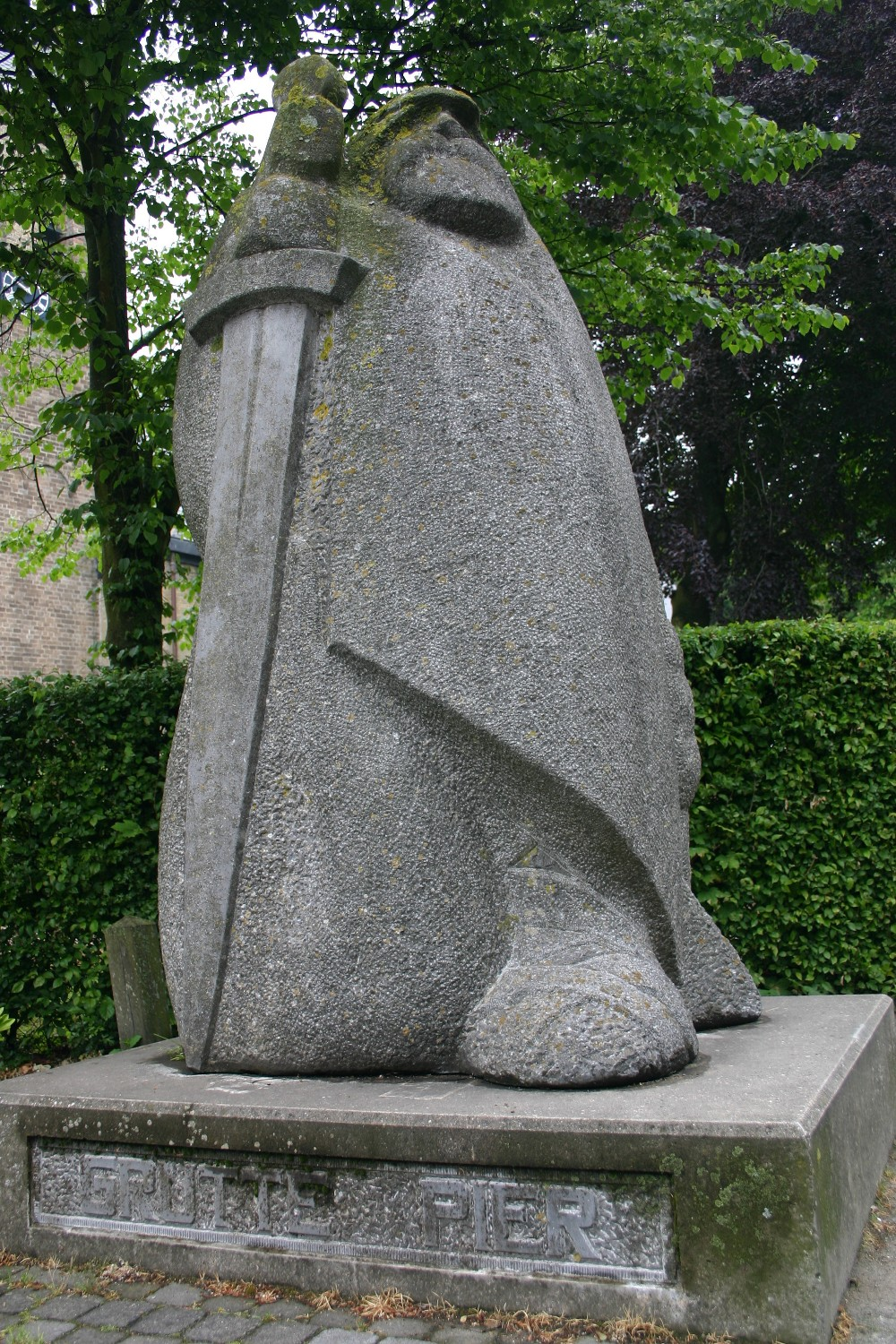
Grutte Pier statue

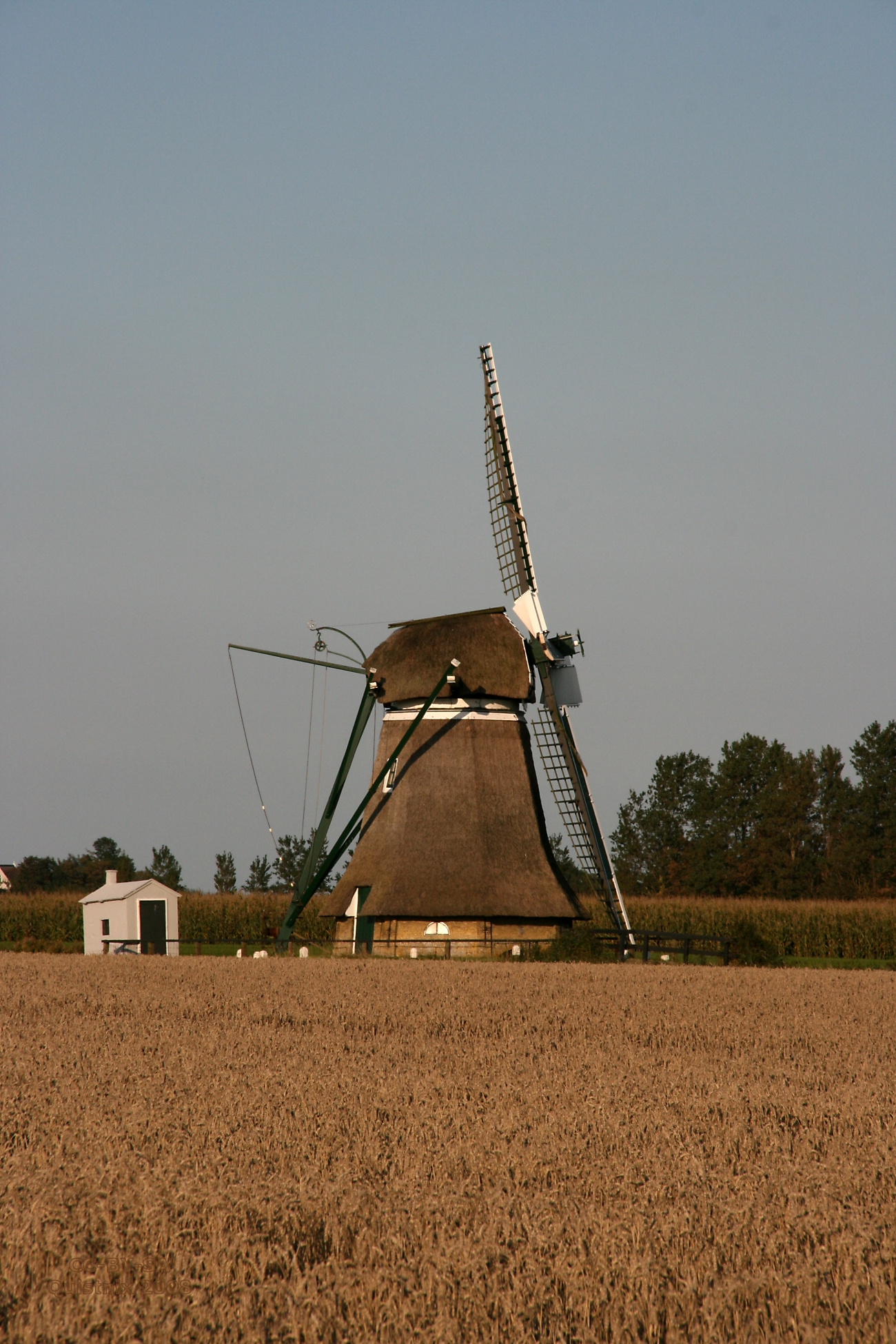
Windmill De Eendracht

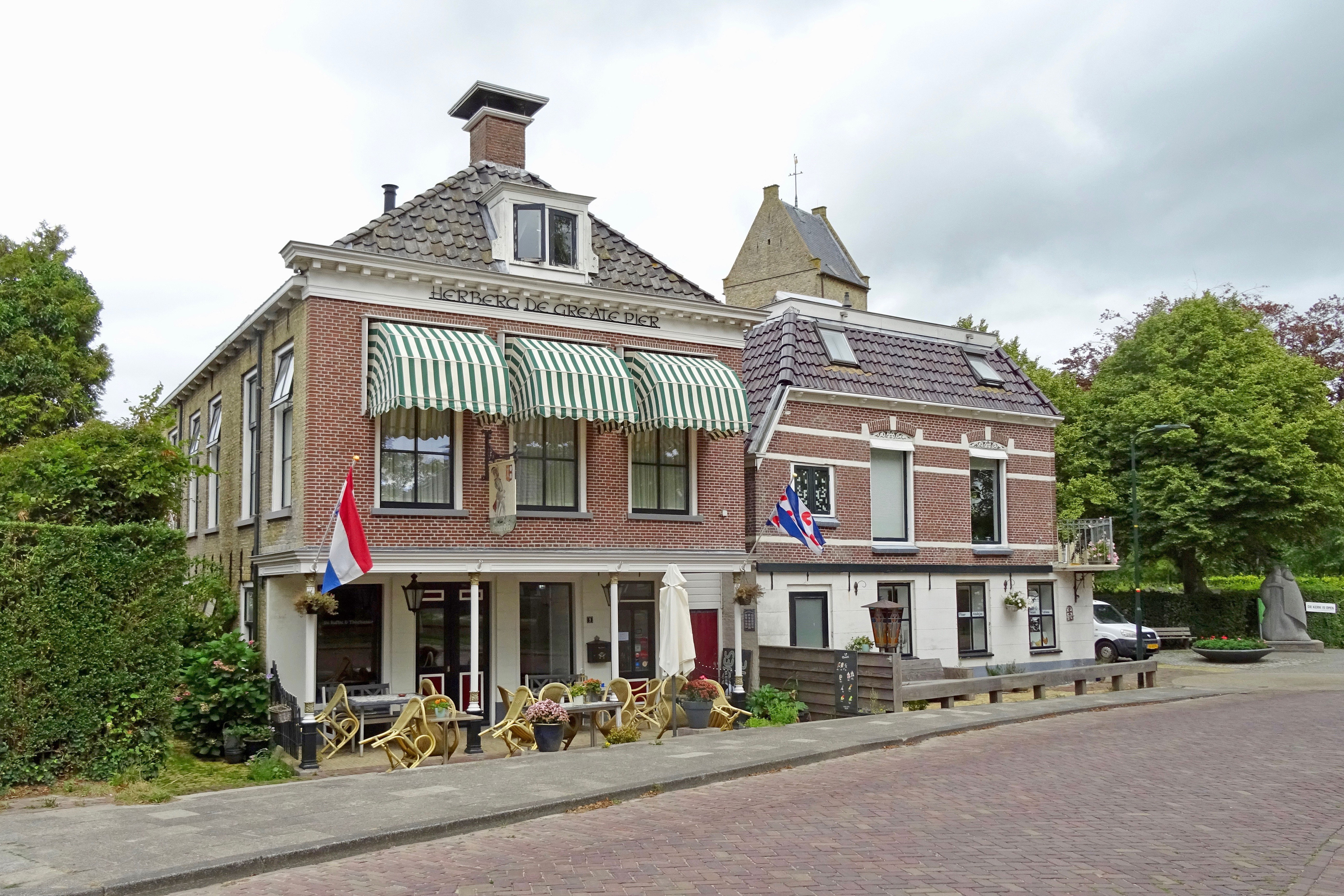
Inn Greate Pier

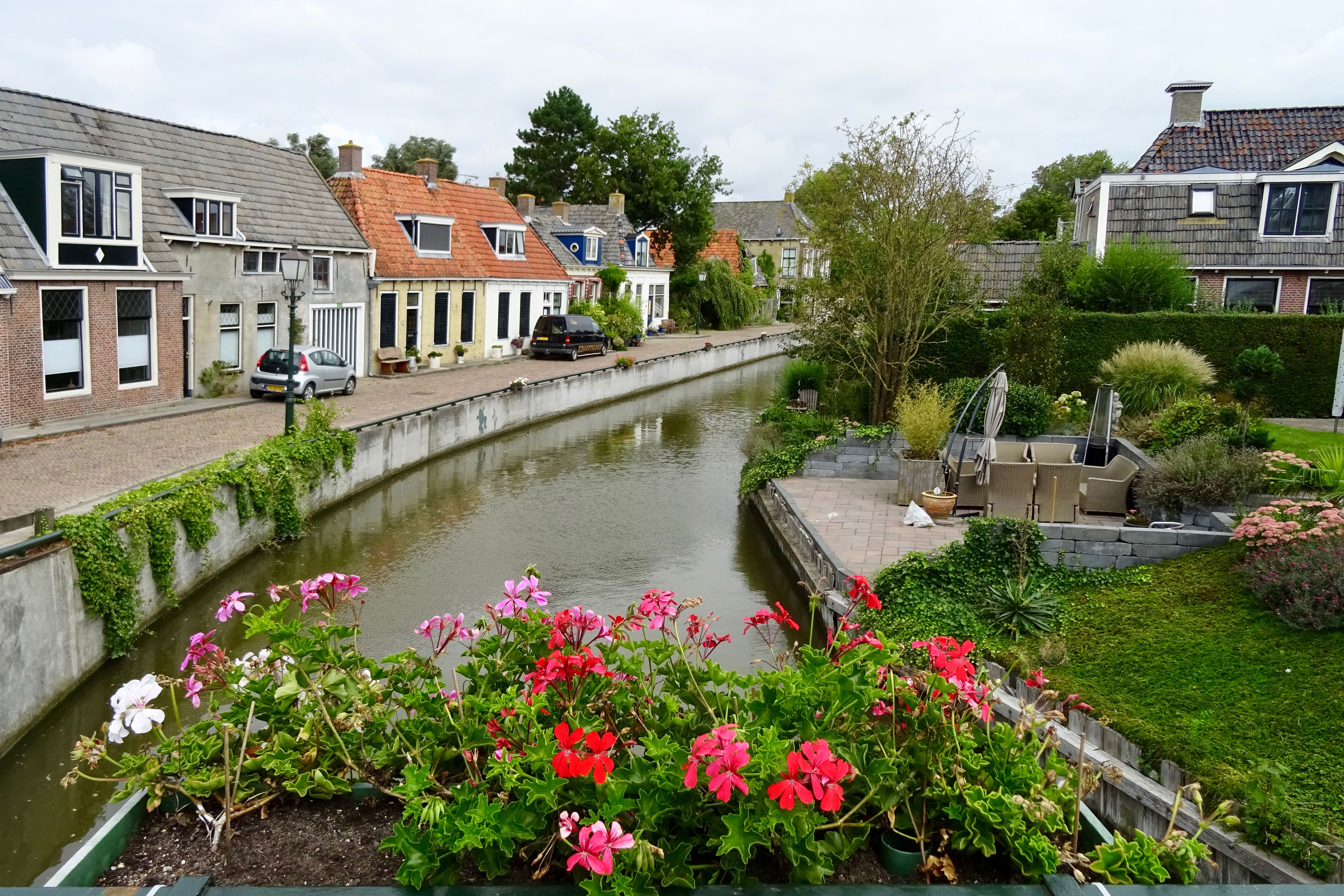
Street view
