= Areum =

Areum may refer to:

- Ah-reum, Korean given name
- Areum-dong
