= Petrus Thaborita =

Frisian monk, historian and writer

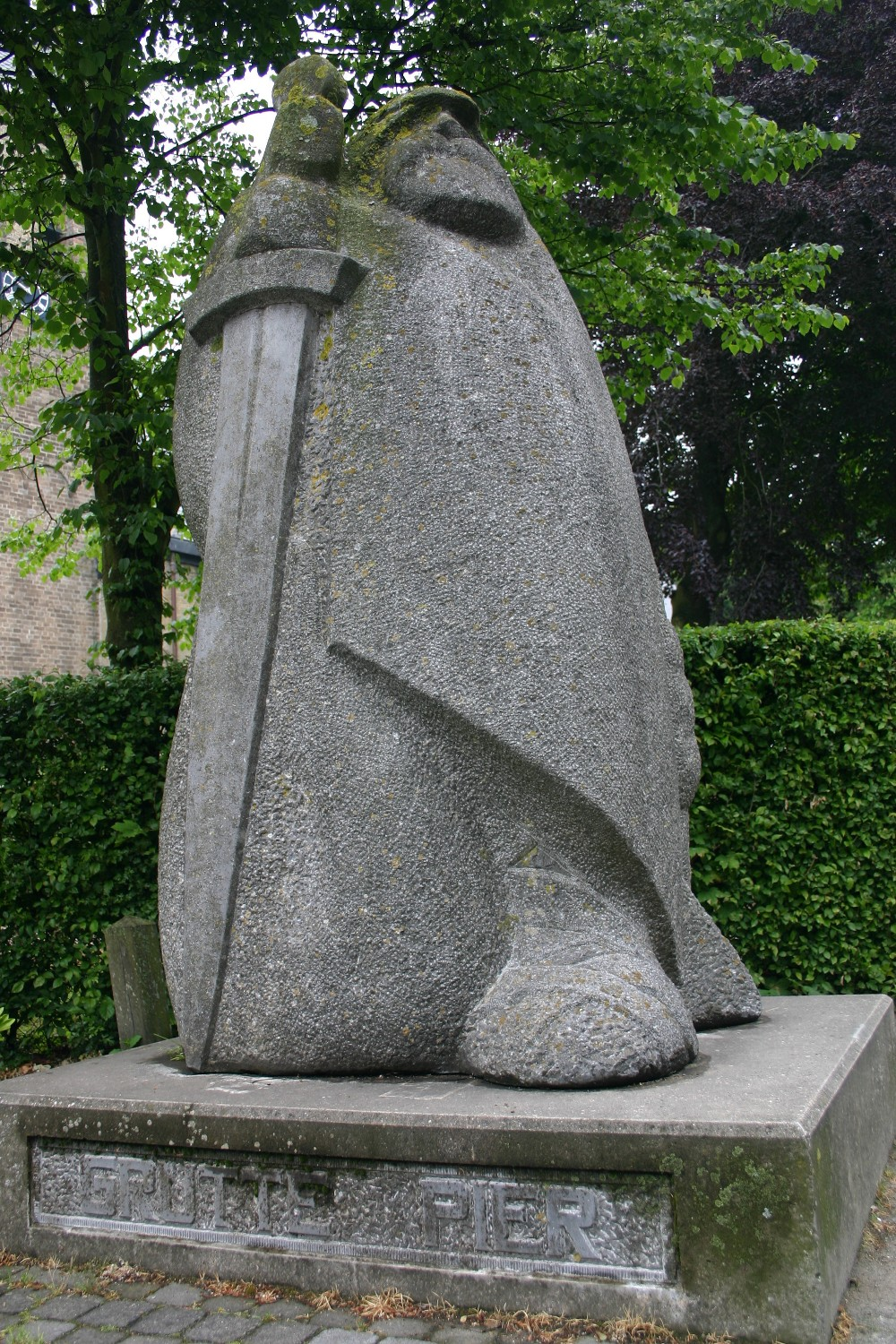
Statue of Pier Gerlofs Donia. Famous rebel and freedom fighter of legendary strength and size of whom Thaborita wrote

Petrus Jacobi Thaborita (Latinised name form of Peter Jacobusz van Bolsward) (Bolsward, 1450–1527) was a Frisian monk, historian and writer. He is best known for his writings on the Frisian freedom fighter Pier Gerlofs Donia, and for writing down Donia's last words. In the extended works by Thaborita van Bolsward is found information on the Frisian chieftains warlords Jancko Douwama and Haring Harinxma (the Donia ancestor).

Dutch writer Conrad Busken Huet used many of Thaborita's descriptions of historical figures in later books. He also translated the description of Donia. Thaborita joined the monastery at an advanced age, as a widower with two sons. Petrus also dedicated a chapter in one of his books to Donia:

About the death of Greate Pier, Pier Gerlofs Donia:

"In dat selue iaer van 20 soe is ghestoruen groet Pyer, op Sinte Lucas nacht. Van deese Pier was grote spraeck in Hollant, in Brabant ende in ander landen, van sin grote stercheit ende gruwelicheit, ende van sin grote oghen; ende sy maectent groter dant was; mer noch tans wasset een groet, swaert, man mit grote oghen, grote schouwer ende een groten baert, ende gruweliken van aensyen, sonderlingh als hy toernich was; ende hy was grof ende plompt van spraeck ende wesen; want hy en conste nyet bequam spreken voert recht ofte voer heeren; mer mit sin groue Fryesche slaghen quaem hy mede vort, ende dat ghyngh hem alsoe plomp of, dat alle menschen, die daer by stonden, worden beweghen tot lachgen; ende hy was froem ende fel op die vianden, mer hy was redelyk van herten als een Kersten man."
English translation:

"In the very same year of 1520, on Saint Lucas night, Grutte Pier died. Of this Pier in Holland, in Brabant and other countries tales went around about his strength and his brutality and about his large eyes. And they made it bigger than it was. Yet he was a big, heavy man, with big eyes, broad shoulders and a big beard and terrible of appearance especially when he was angry. And he was rude and unarticulated of speech and manners. Because he wasn't able to speak properly in court or in front of lords. He often made jokes, so that all the people standing around, were made to laugh. He had killed many enemies, but he had a rather good character, as if he were a good Christian."

Anton Reinhard Falck was the owner of the original documents, he lent these to the researchers Visser and Amersfoordt.
