= Conrad Busken Huet =

Dutch pastor, journalist and literary critic (1826–1886)

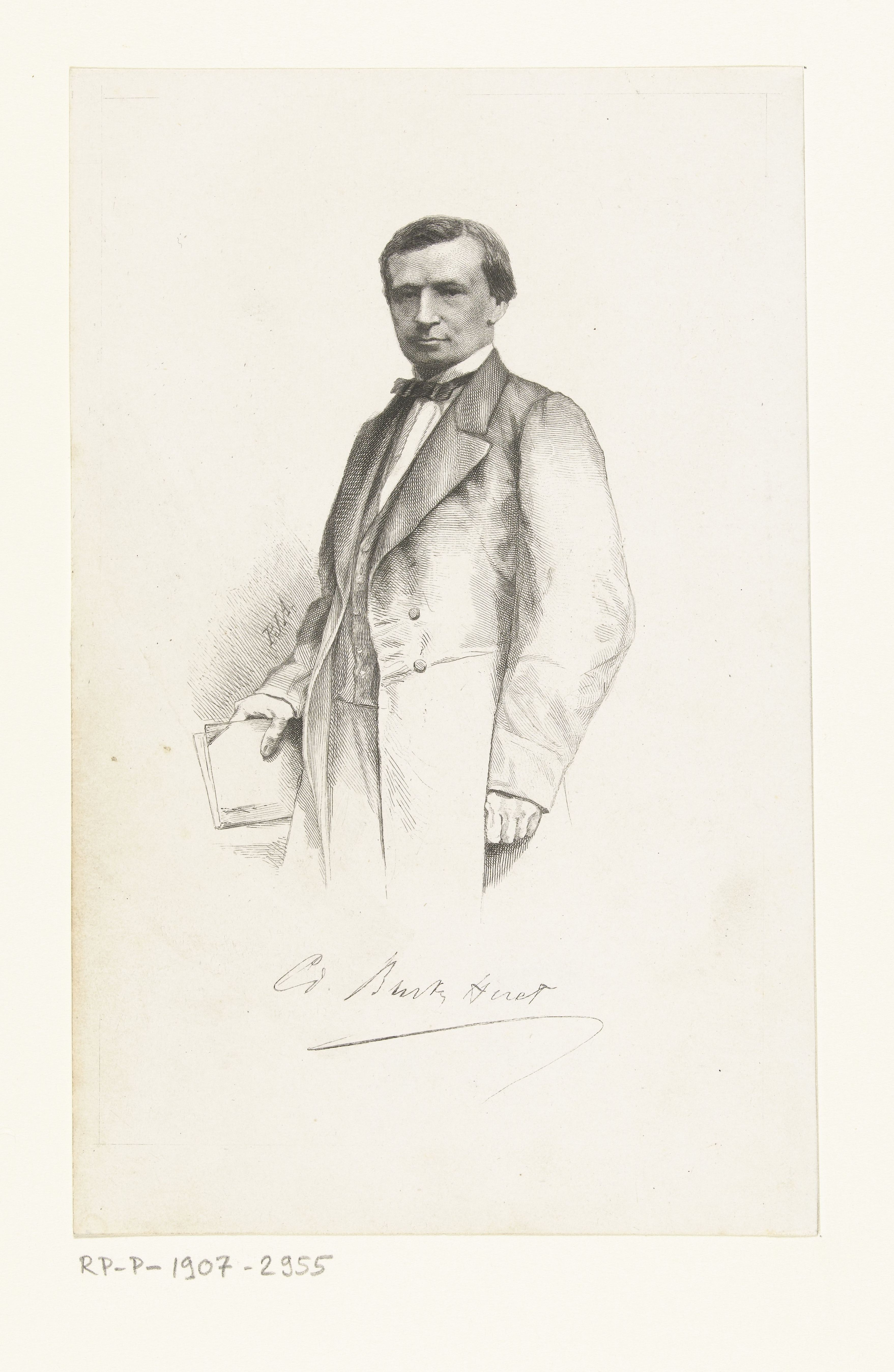
Conrad Busken Huet

Conrad Busken Huet (28 December 1826, The Hague – 1 May 1886, Paris) was a Dutch pastor, journalist and literary critic.

== Biography ==
Busken Huet, son of a Hague civil servant, attended Gymnasium Haganum and studied theology at Leiden University, in Geneva and Lausanne. He was appointed pastor of the Walloon church in Haarlem in 1851. A student of Prof. Johannes Henricus Scholten and friend of Prof. Abraham Kuenen, Busken Huet familiarized his parishioners with the insights of 'Modern Theology', e.g. with respect to the Bible. In 1857-1858 he created a scandal by publishing Brieven over den Bijbel ('Letters on the Bible'), in which he popularized the 'Modern' view on the origins and authority of the Bible:
"Just as all Christianity is purely devotional love after Christ’s example, the entire Bible is purely a human creation. Yes, a creation inspired by the personal faith of the prophets and apostles; brought forth by the national genius of the Hebrews, which genius both the apostles and the prophets represented; one that did not fall from the clouds like a meteor, but rose from the bosom of the Jewish people, as the goddess of beauty rose from the billows whose foam created her; one which was not, in part or whole, put on paper and collected in one or two volumes through the external intervention of Providence, but which emerged leaf by leaf, like a budding flower, from the stem of Israel; one that did not bypass the Jews or go over the heads as it came to us from God, but came from the Jews themselves, under God’s guidance; a human creation, in other words, inspired by human faith, consummated by human art, preserved by human care, understood by every true human heart and acknowledged as the voice of the heart, as the voice of human devotion, human suffering, human happiness: such is the human creation the Bible is to me."

In 1862, after realizing that these 'Letters' had ruined his clerical career, Busken Huet resigned his charge. Attempting journalism instead, he went out to Java in 1868 as the editor of a newspaper. Before this time, however, he had begun his career as a polemical man of letters, although it was not until 1872 that he was made famous by the first series of his Literary Fantasies and Chronicles, a title under which he gradually gathered in successive volumes all that was most durable in his work as a critic. His one novel, Lidewyde, was written under strong French influences.

Returning from the Dutch East Indies, Busken Huet settled for the remainder of his life in Paris. For the last quarter of a century he had been the acknowledged dictator in all questions of Dutch literary taste. Perfectly honest, desirous to be sympathetic, widely read, and devoid of all sectarian obstinacy, Busken Huet introduced into Holland the light and air of Europe. He made it his business to break down the narrow prejudices and the still narrower self-satisfaction of his countrymen, without endangering his influence by a mere effusion of paradox. He was a brilliant writer, who would have been admired in any language, but whose appearance in a literature so stiff and dead as that of Holland in the fifties was dazzling enough to produce a sort of awe and stupefaction. The posthumous correspondence of Busken Huet has been published. Also, Busken Huet used papers by Peter Thaborita for his description of Pier Gerlofs Donia.

== See also ==
- Alexander Johan Berman
