= De Eendracht, Kimswerd =

Smock mill in the Netherlands

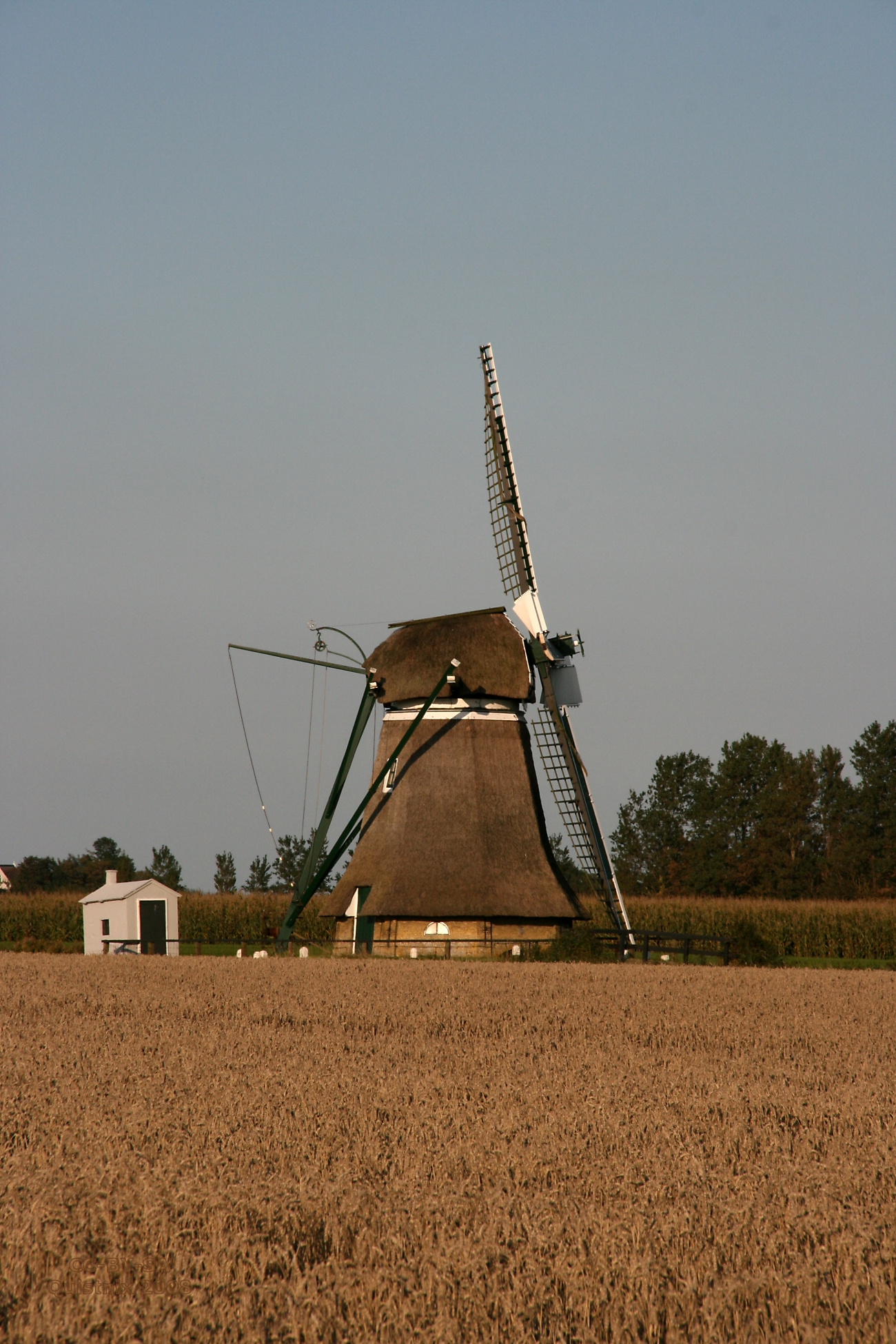
- De Eendracht, September 2008.

Origin
- Mill name: De Eendracht
- Mill location: Dijksterbuorren 2, 8821 LA Kimswerd
- Coordinates: 53°08′04″N 5°25′37″E
- Operator(s): Stichting De Fryske Mole
- Year built: 1872

Information
- Purpose: Drainage mill
- Type: Smock mill
- Storeys: Two-storey smock
- Base storeys: Single-storey base
- No. of sails: Four sails
- Type of sails: Two Common sails, two Patent sails with Dekkerised leading edges
- Windshaft: Wood
- Winding: Tailpole and winch
- Auxiliary power: Diesel engine
- Type of pump: Archimedes' screw

De Eendracht (Dutch pronunciation: [də ˈʔeːndrɑxt]; English: The Unity) is a smock mill in Kimswerd, Friesland, Netherlands which was built in 1872. The mill has been restored to working order. The mill is officially designated as being held in reserve for use in times of emergency. It is listed as a Rijksmonument, number 39358.

== History ==
De Eendracht was built in 1872 by millwright Otto R Posthumus to drain the De Eendracht Polder. Four Patent sails were fitted in 1899. In 1940, the sails were fitted with leading edges streamlined on the Dekker system. A diesel engine was added as auxiliary power in 1966, it was removed when the mill was restored in 1975. During this restoration, the Patent sails were removed, as was the Dekker system from the sails. Four Common sails were fitted. The mill was bought by Stichting De Fryske Mole (English: Frisian Mills Foundation) on 22 September 1982. In 1993, the mill was restored by Fabrikaat Buurma, Oudeschans, Groningen. At this time it carried one pair of Common sails and one pair of Patent sails fitted with Dekkerised leading edges. A new wooden windshaft was fitted by millwright Westra of Franeker in 1982. In 2006, the mill was designated by Wetterskip Fryslân as being held in reserve for use in times of emergency.

== Description ==
De Eendracht is what the Dutch describe as an Grondzeiler. It is a two-storey smock mill on a single-storey base. There is no stage, the sails reaching down almost to ground level. The mill is winded by tailpole and winch. The smock and cap are thatched. The sails are two Common sails and two Patent sails with Dekkerised leading edges. They have a span of 17.00 metres (55 ft 9 in). The sails are carried on a wooden windshaft. The windshaft also carries the brake wheel which has 52 cogs. This drives the wallower (32 cogs) at the top of the upright shaft. At the bottom of the upright shaft is the crown wheel, which has 46 cogs drives a gearwheel with 35 cogs on the axle of the Archimedes' screw. The axle of the Archimedes' screw is 508 millimetres (1 ft 8 in) diameter. The screw is 1.34 metres (4 ft 5 in) diameter and 5.52 metres (18 ft 1 in) long. It is inclined at 20.4°. Each revolution of the screw lifts 802 litres (176 imp gal) of water.

== Public access ==
De Eendracht is open by appointment, or when the mill is working.
