= Pier Gerlofs Donia =

Frisian warrior, pirate, and rebel (1480–1520)

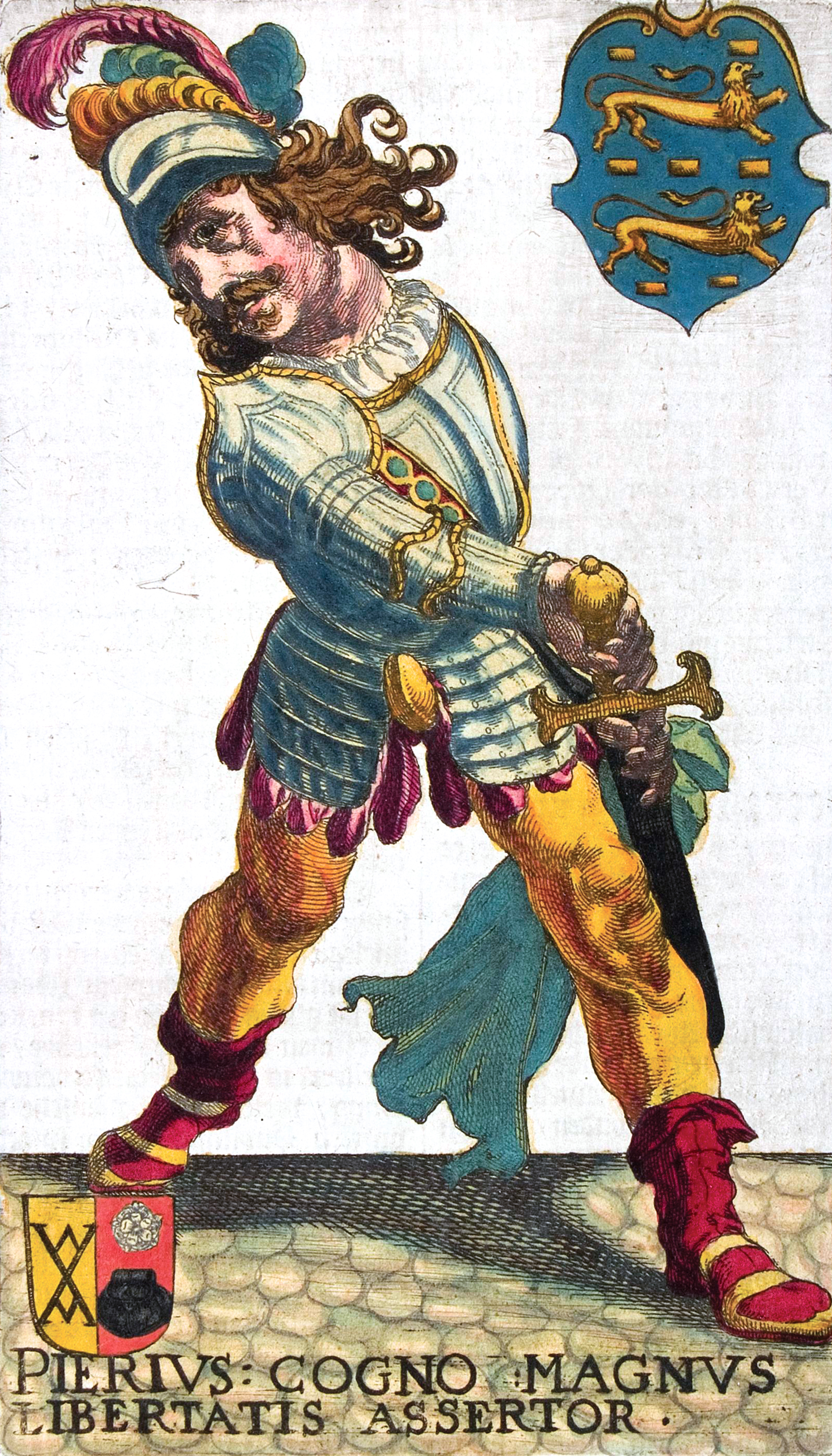
- Etching of Grutte Pier, from Chronycke ofte Historische Geschiedenis van Frieslant, published in 1622
- Born: 1480; Kimswerd, Frisia, Holy Roman Empire
- Died: October 28, 1520 (aged 39–40); Sneek, Lordship of Frisia, Holy Roman Empire
- Other names: Grutte Pier, Grote Pier
- Occupations: farmer, rebel leader, pirate
- Known for: Leading a Frisian rebellion between 1515 and 1519
- Spouse: Rintsje Syrtsema
- Children: Gerlof Piers Donia and Wobbel Piers Donia
- Parent(s): Gerlof Piers Donia and Fokel Sybrants Bonga

Pier Gerlofs Donia (c. 1480 – 28 October 1520) was a Frisian farmer, rebel leader, and pirate. He is best known by his West Frisian nickname Grutte Pier ('Big Pier'; in the pre-1980 West Frisian spelling written as Greate Pier), or by the Dutch translation Grote Pier, which referred to his legendary size, strength, and bravery.

His life is mostly shrouded in legend. Based upon a description now attributed to Pier's contemporary Petrus Thaborita, the 19th-century Dutch historian Conrad Busken Huet wrote that Grutte Pier was

A tower of a fellow as strong as an ox, of dark complexion, broad shouldered, with a long black beard and moustache. A natural rough humorist, who through unfortunate circumstances was recast into an awful brute. Out of personal revenge for the bloody injustice that befell him (in 1515) with the killing of kinsfolk and destruction of his property he became a freedom fighter of legendary standing.

== Early life and family ==
Pier Gerlofs was born around 1480 in Kimswerd near the city of Harlingen, Wonseradeel (modern Friesland, Netherlands). Pier Gerlofs was one of at least four children born to Fokel Sybrants Bonga and Gerlof Piers. Pier's mother Fokel was the daughter of the Schieringer noblemen Sybrant Doytsesz Bonga of Bongastate, Kimswerd.

Pier married Rintsje Syrtsema and they had two children, a son named Gerlof and a daughter named Wobbel, who were born around 1510. Pier died in 1520, and in 1525, Pier's mother appointed in her will Pier's brother, Sybren, as guardian of Pier's children, who still were minors. Pier and his brother-in-law, Ane Pijbes (husband of Tijdt Gerlofs), were partners in the farming estate of Meyllemastate in Kimswerd.

Wijerd Jelckama often is described by 18th and 19th-century authors as the nephew of Grutte Pier. Contemporary Worp van Thabor identifies him simply as Weird van Bolsward. Modern authors such as J.J. Kalma doubt the nephew connection, and Brouwer in the Encyclopedia of Friesland states that Wijerd was not Grutte Pier's nephew but instead his "lieutenant".

== Rebellion ==
Approximately 7 kilometres (4.3 mi) to the north-east of Donia's village of Kimswerd, in the city of Franeker, the Black Band, a Landsknecht regiment in the service of George, Duke of Saxony was quartered. The regiment was charged with suppressing the civil war between the Vetkopers, who opposed Burgundian and subsequently Habsburg rule, and the Schieringers. The Black Band were notorious as a violent military force; when their pay was insufficient or lacking, they would extract payments from local villagers. On 29 January 1515, the Black Band plundered Donia's village, then allegedly raped and killed his wife, Rintze Syrtsema, burning to the ground both the village church and Donia's estate. Seeking revenge, Pier started a guerrilla war campaign against the Habsburgs and allied himself with Charles of Egmond, Duke of Guelders (1492–1538).

== Peasant rebels ==
=== Arumer Zwarte Hoop ===
Pier's armed band, known as the Arumer Zwarte Hoop (English: Black Hope (or heap) of Arum), were pirates mainly active against the Hollanders and Burgundians at sea. He managed to capture many English and Dutch ships, mainly on the Zuider Zee (today's ‘IJsselmeer’). Erasmus criticized Grutte Pier's exploits.

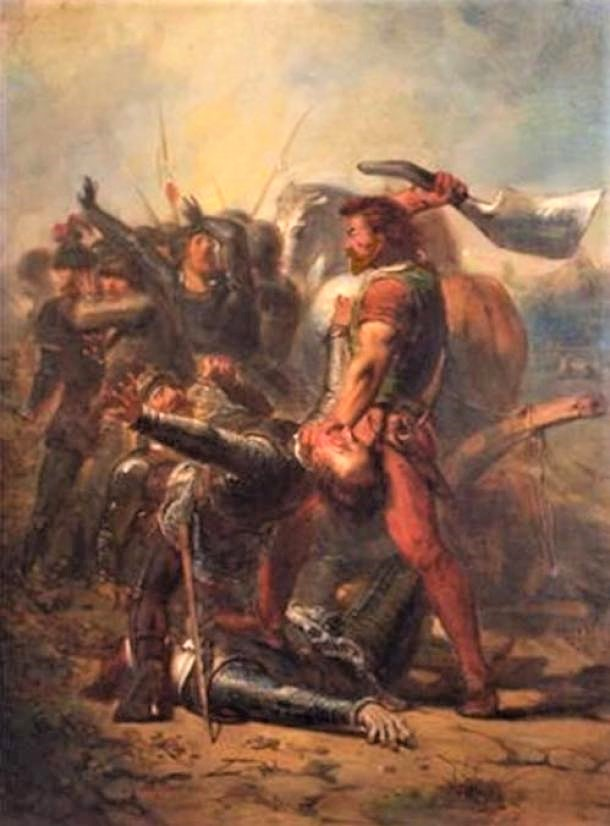
"De dapperheid van Grote Pier" (The bravery of Grote Pier), anno 1516, Oil on canvas by Johannes Hinderikus Egenberger, (Arnhem 1822 – Utrecht 1897)

=== Pirating in the Zuiderzee ===
Pier targeted ships that travelled the Zuiderzee and was very active in 1517, when he used his "signal ships" to attack ships in the region of the West Frisian coast, to which he also transported Geldrian forces, setting them ashore at Medemblik. Pier bore a personal enmity to Medemblik and its inhabitants as, in earlier years, soldiers from Medemblik had cooperated with the Holland army commanded by Duke Charles, the future Emperor. In March 1498, Medemblik was where representatives of the Schieringers met the Saxon ruler duke Albrecht to request Saxon protection from the Vetkopers—a request that resulted in the Saxon occupation of Friesland, Netherlands. On 24 June 1517, Grutte Pier and his Arumer Zwarte Hoop, consisting of some 4,000 soldiers from Frisia and Guelders, sailed to West Frisia, passing Enkhuizen, landing near Wervershoof and advancing to Medemblik. They swiftly captured Medemblik, killing many inhabitants and taking many others prisoner. Some were released on payment of a high ransom. Some of the town's inhabitants fled and found safety at Kasteel Radboud. The castle's governor, Joost van Buren, succeeded in keeping the aggressors outside the castle walls. Unable to take the castle, the Arumer Zwarte Hoop plundered the town and set it on fire. With most houses made of wood, the town, including the church, monastery and town hall, was razed. After this partial victory, Pier and his army stormed both Nieuwburg and Middleburg Castle near Alkmaar, plundered and set them on fire, leaving only ruins.

=== Battles on land ===
In 1517, the Arumer Zwarte Hoop captured the town of Asperen, slaughtering virtually all its inhabitants. They then used the heavily fortified city as a base until driven out by Holland's Stadhouder. In response to the attacks on Medemblik and Alkmaar and the failure of the Captain General of Amstelland, Waterland and Gooiland to defend his territories, the Stadhouder of Holland agreed to outfit a war fleet in July 1517. The fleet came under the supreme command of Anthonius van den Houte, Lord of Vleteren, appropriately titled "Admiral of the Zuiderzee". In the name of Charles V, van den Houte announced he would free the region of Frisian and Gelder piracy. Although van den Houte was initially successful, with some of the Frisian vessels being burnt near Bunschoten, Grutte Pier responded by seizing 11 of Holland's ships in a battle off the coast near Hoorn in 1518.

Bûter, brea, en griene tsiis; wa't dat net sizze kin, is gjin oprjochte Fries

Shortly after this victory, Pier defeated 300 Hollanders in Hindelopen. According to a legend, Pier forced his captives to repeat a shibboleth to distinguish Frisians from Holland and Lower German infiltrators:

Bûter, brea en griene tsiis: wa't dat net sizze kin, is gjin oprjochte Fries. (Butter, bread, and green cheese: if you can’t say that, you’re not a real Frisian.)

== Later years and death ==
Despite his successes, Pier could not turn the Burgundian/Habsburg tide and he retired, disillusioned, in 1519. Wijerd Jelckama took over the command of Pier's forces. Pier died peacefully in his bed at Grootzand 12 in the Frisian city of Sneek on 28 October 1520. Pier is buried in Sneek in the 15th-century Groote Kerk (English: Great Church; also called the Martinikerk). His tomb is located at the north side of the church.

Pier's son Gerloff died unmarried and left no descendants. His daughter Wobbel married three times, lastly to one Popta with whom she had children. Therefore, Donia left no descendants in the male line, but has many descendants through his daughter.

== Extreme strength and size ==
In 1791, Jacobus Kok wrote that above the porticus of the New City Hall of Leeuwarden, two remarkably large swords were found which were said to have belonged to Grutte Pier and Wijerd Jelckama. Donia was noted for the ability to wield this great sword so efficiently that he could behead multiple people with it in a single blow.

Today, a great sword that is said to have belonged to Pier is on display at the Fries Museum in Leeuwarden. It measures 2.13 metres (7 ft) in length and weighs 6.6 kilograms (14.6 lb). Pier was alleged to be so strong that he could bend coins using just his thumb, index, and middle finger. A huge helmet said to be Grutte Pier's is kept in the town hall of Sneek.

== In popular culture ==
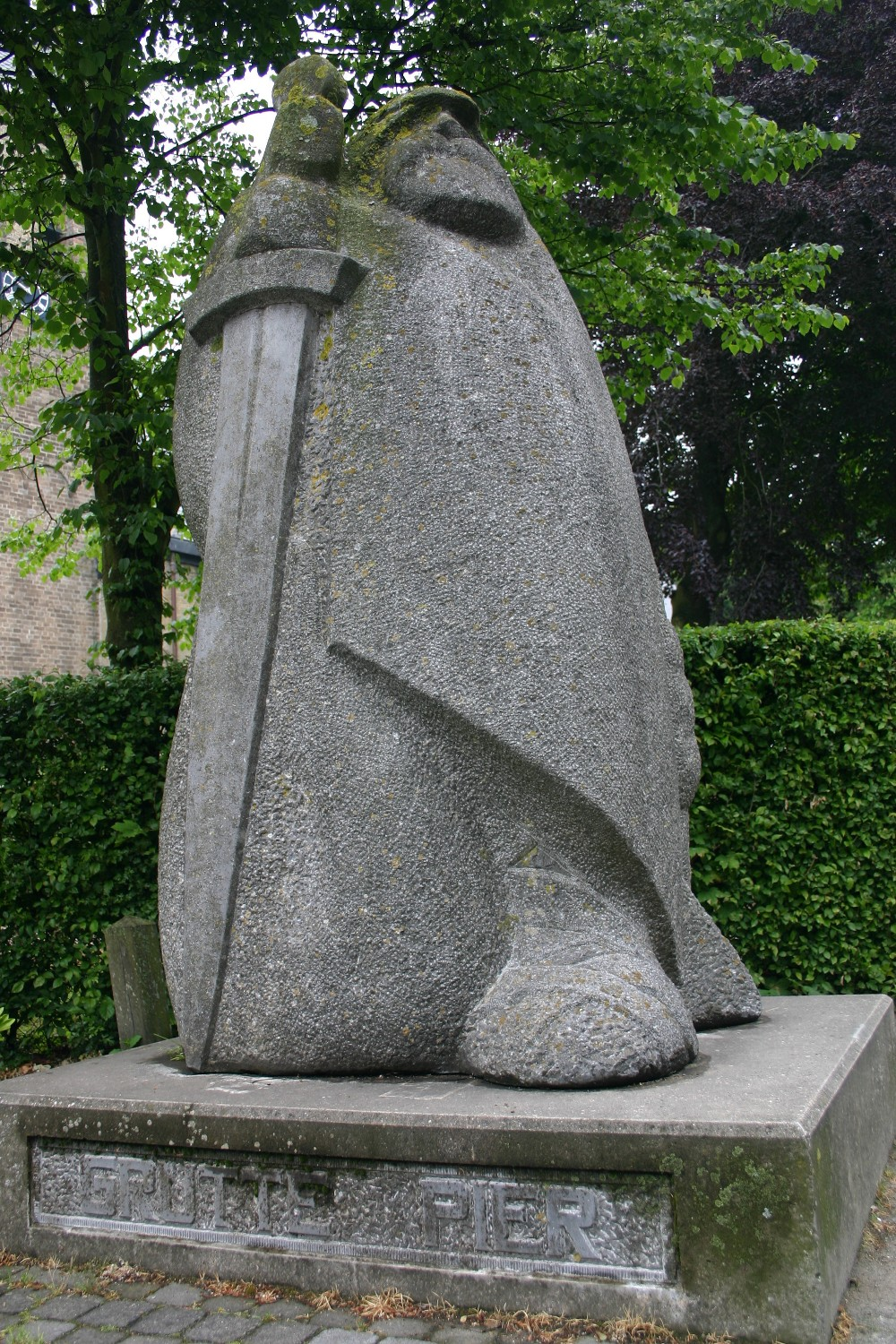
Statue of Grutte Pier in his hometown of Kimswerd. The line of text on the foot of the statue reads in Frisian "Grutte Pier". Because of its stocky oval shape, the statue is often compared with a pepper shaker, which does not do justice to the Frisian hero.

=== Gysbert Japicx ===
The seventeenth century Friese poet Gysbert Japicx (1603–1666) wrote in his composition "Tjesck Moars See Aengste" ("Grandmother's Sea Anguish") the following verse in reference to Grote Pier (eng. trans., Large Peter):

Thee I'll follow, noble Peter,
Thou wert nobler far and greater,
Than the noblest, home-kept lord,
Battling like an ancient Roman,
For his country with her foeman,
Whom he chased with fire and sword.

=== Fivefal ===
Stories about Pier grew into legends that often share themes with stories of other strong men in Germanic heroic literature. For example, one story says Pier ploughed his land by pulling the plough himself instead of using horses. Another story states that Pier could lift a horse above his head. Fivefal is the name in Frisian of a Frisian legend. It tells the story of Pier beating five strong men who came to fight him: the place where he beat them is known as Fivefal, (Lit. Five fall) for all five of them fell to the ground.

=== Television ===
In the 1970s, in the Dutch Floris series, Donia was a major character played by actor Hans Boskamp.

In the 22nd episode of Season 9 of Forged in Fire, originally aired in October 2022, "Supersized Swords", the final challenge was to have two contestants forge a replica of Grutte Pier's great sword.

The life of Pier is featured in an episode of 'Dark Marvels' titled "Blades of Fury", originally aired August 7, 2023.

=== Sport ===
The Greate Pier rugby club in Leeuwarden, which plays on a regional level, is named after Donia in Friesland. Many other clubs and several ships are named after him.

=== 2020 Omrop Fryslân study ===
In 2020, the Frisian-language broadcasting company Omrop Fryslân conducted a research study, which revealed that 70% of respondents in Friesland considered Donia to be one of the greatest Frisian historical heroes, but more than half of respondents erroneously connected his name to the Battle of Warns (1345), about two centuries before Donia's time. A further 40% of respondents believed he had served in the army of Radbod of Frisia, which predated Donia by more than 700 years.
