= Pingjum =

Pingjum Penjum
- Village
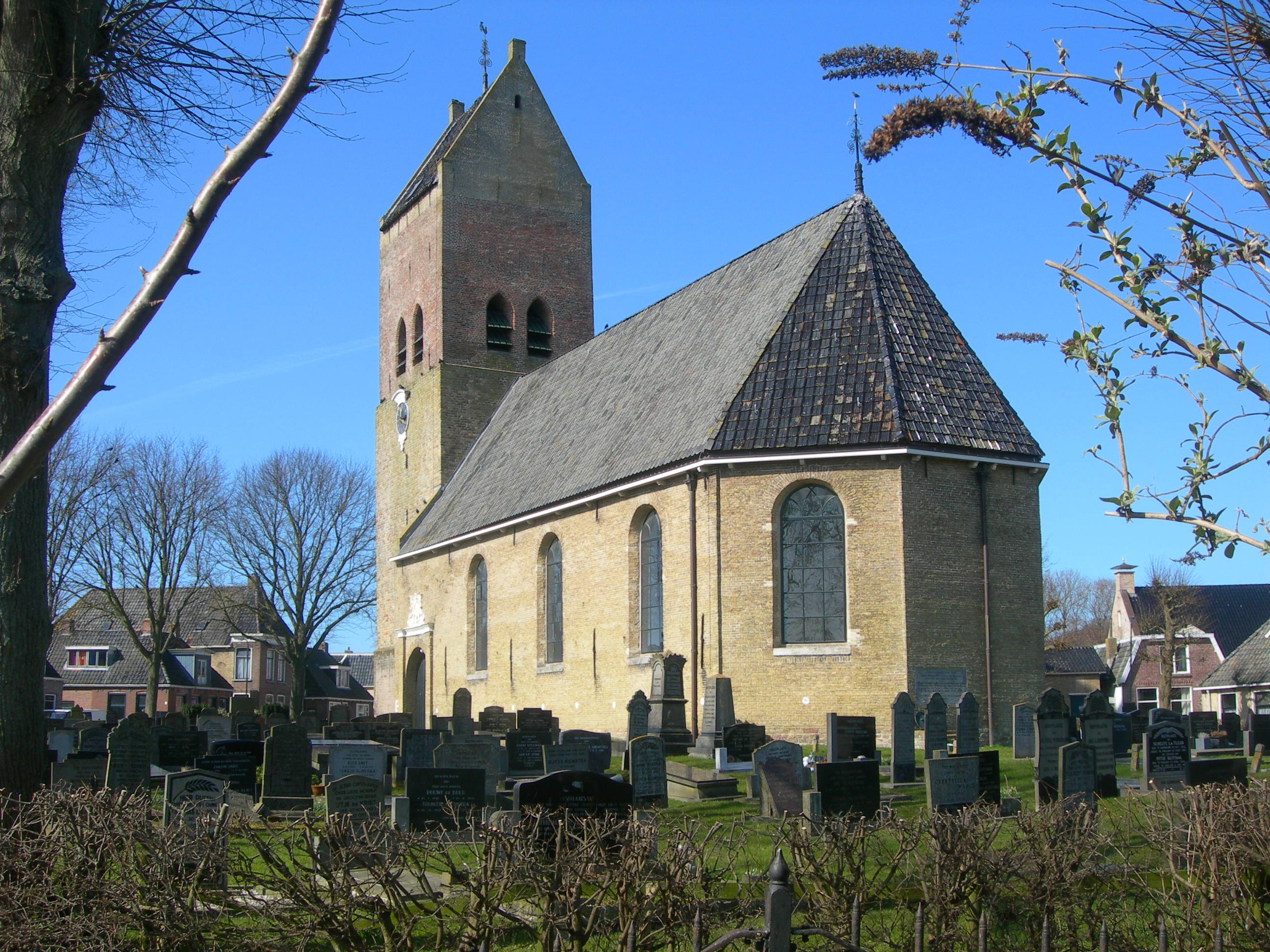
- St Victory Church

- Flag Coat of arms

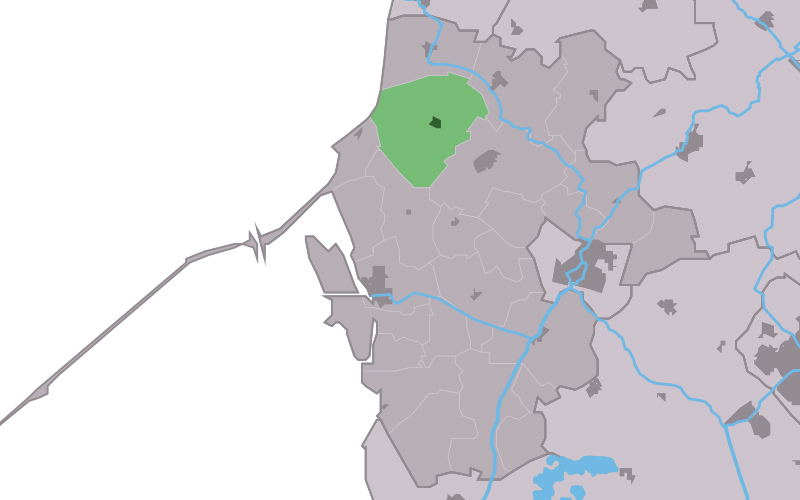
- Location in the former Wûnseradiel municipality

- Location in the Netherlands Pingjum (Netherlands)
- Country: Netherlands
- Province: Friesland
- Municipality: Súdwest-Fryslân

Area
  - Total: 13.31 km^{2} (5.14 sq mi)
- Elevation: 0.4 m (1.3 ft)

Population (2021)
  - Total: 585
  - Density: 44.0/km^{2} (114/sq mi)
- Time zone: UTC+1 (CET)
  - Summer (DST): UTC+2 (CEST)
- Postal code: 8749
- Dialing code: 0517

Pingjum (West Frisian: Penjum) is a village in the municipality of Súdwest-Fryslân in Friesland, in the northern Netherlands and lies 6.6 kilometres (4.1 mi) southwest of Harlingen. It had a population of around 585 in January 2017.

== History ==
The village was first mentioned in the 13th century as Penningem, and means "settlement of Penne (person)". Pingjum is a terp (artificial living hill) village from the early middle ages which developed on the Marneslenk in a grid structure. According to legend, the earliest settlers were shepherds from Drenthe who decided to build the terps and around 1100 added dikes for further protection against the sea.

The tower of the Dutch Reformed church was built in the 12th or 13th century and was enlarged in the 15th century. The church dates from around 1500 and was enlarged in 1759. A water well is located next to the choir.

In 1524, Menno Simons became priest at the church. Simons started to preach against militarism and was baptised as an adult. His breach with the Catholic church started in Pingjum, and led to the Mennonites. A Mennonite church was built around 1600 as a clandestine church behind a non conspicuous house which was used as clergy house. It is one of the oldest still extant Mennonite churches.

During the February flood of 1825, Frisian seawalls broke. Pingjum was spared thanks to a dike around the village known as the Pingjumer Golden Collar (Pingjumer Gulden Halsband). In 1892 the province of Friesland decided to put an end to the Pingjumer Golden Collar coastal protection, although in several places the dike is still visible. This ring dyke was originally built in part to reclaim land from the Marne Estuary to the north of the village.

Pingjum was home to 116 people in 1840. Part of the terp was excavated.

In 1945, the village was severely damaged. On 15 April 1945, Canadian troops demanded the surrender of the German forces in the area. The Germans refused and hid in Pingjum. An intense two day battle with mortars and flame-throwers followed. On 17 April, the last farms in which the Germans were hiding, were set on fire.

Before 2011, the village was part of the Wûnseradiel municipality.

== Notable residents ==
- Obbe Sikkes Bangma (1768–1829), mathematician
- Rients Gratama, comedian
- Jan Ykema, Olympic speedskating medallist, lives in Pingjum

== Gallery ==
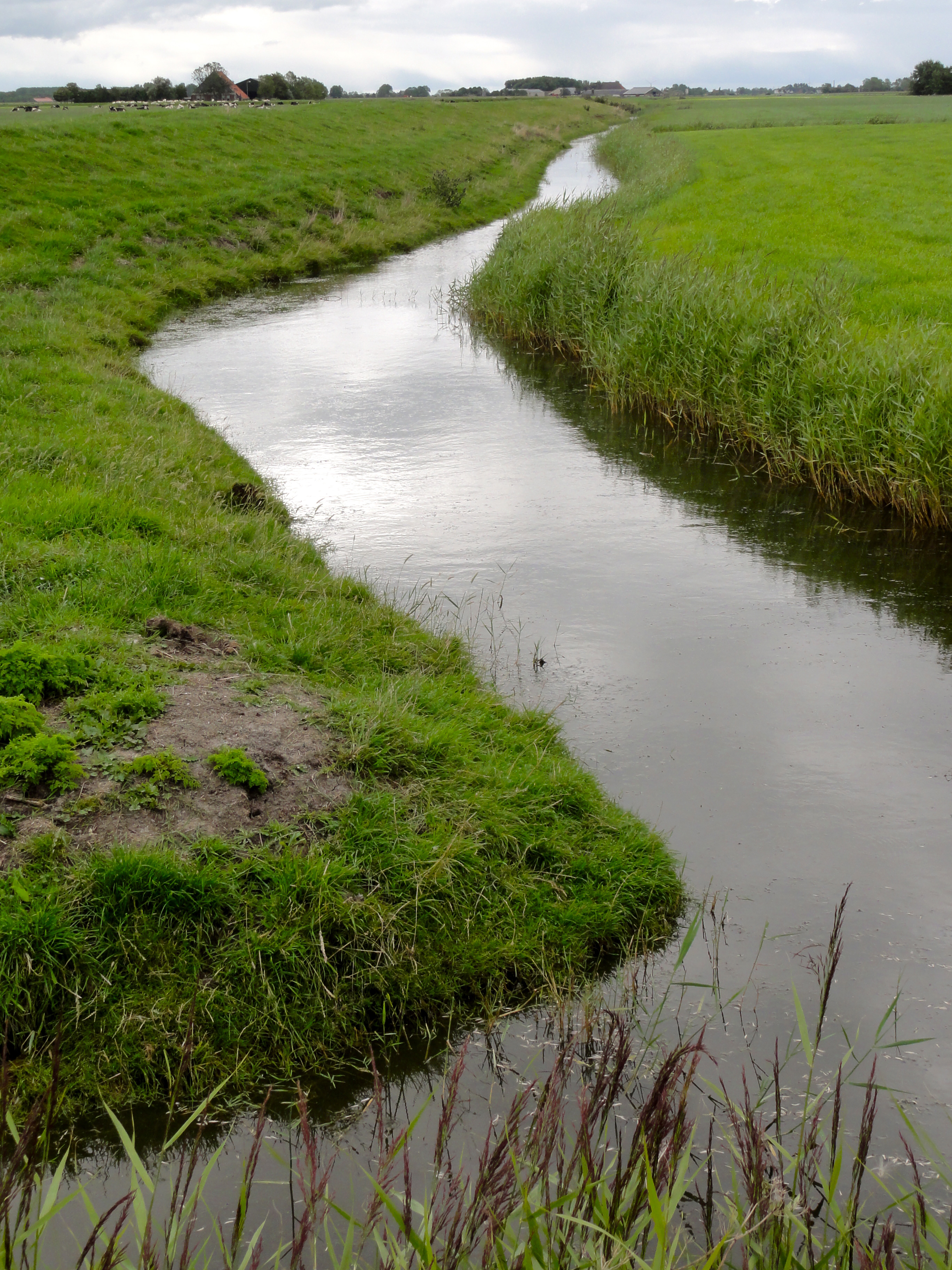
The Pingjumer Golden Collar southwest of Pingjum in 2011

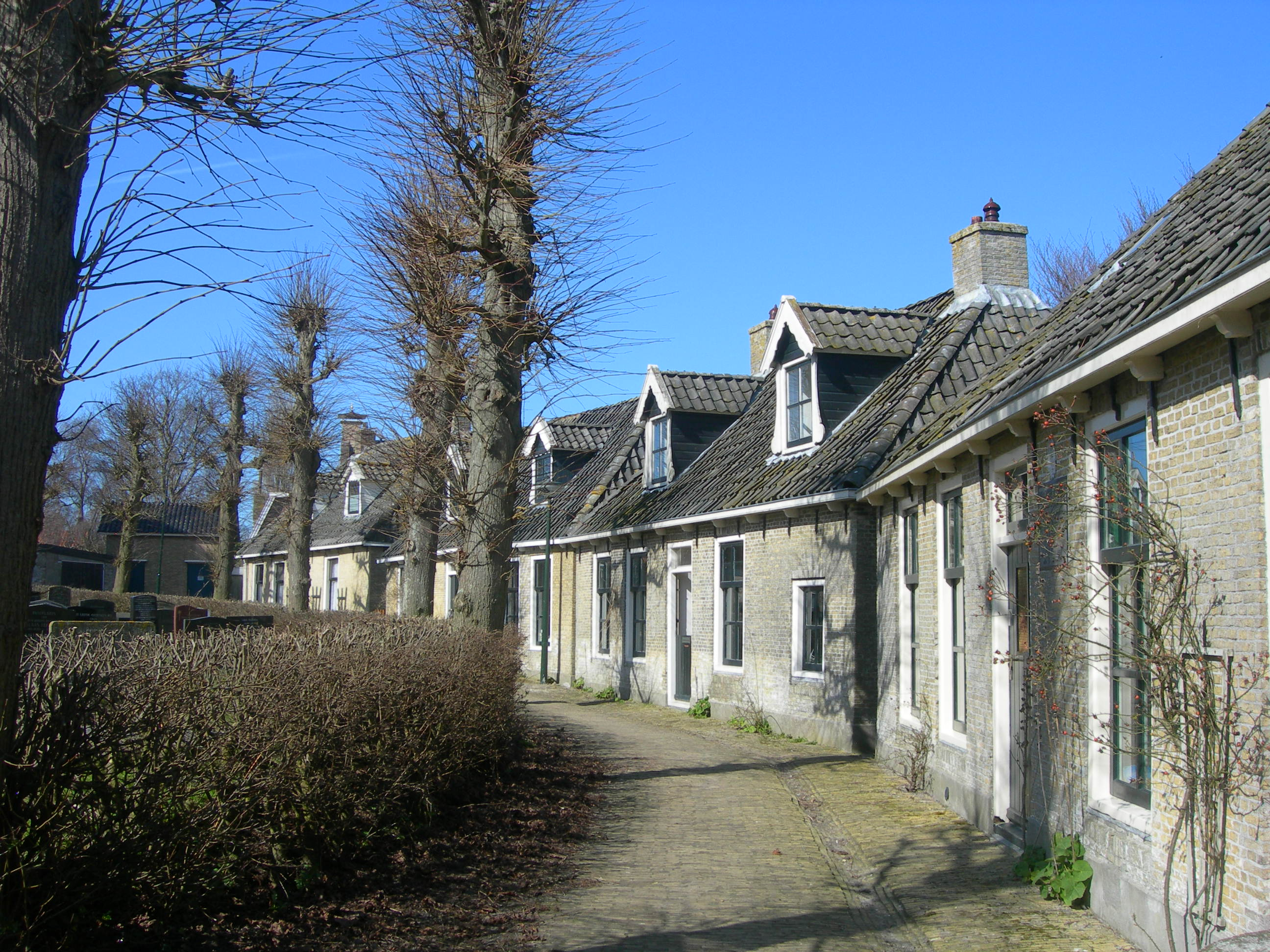
Houses in Pingjum

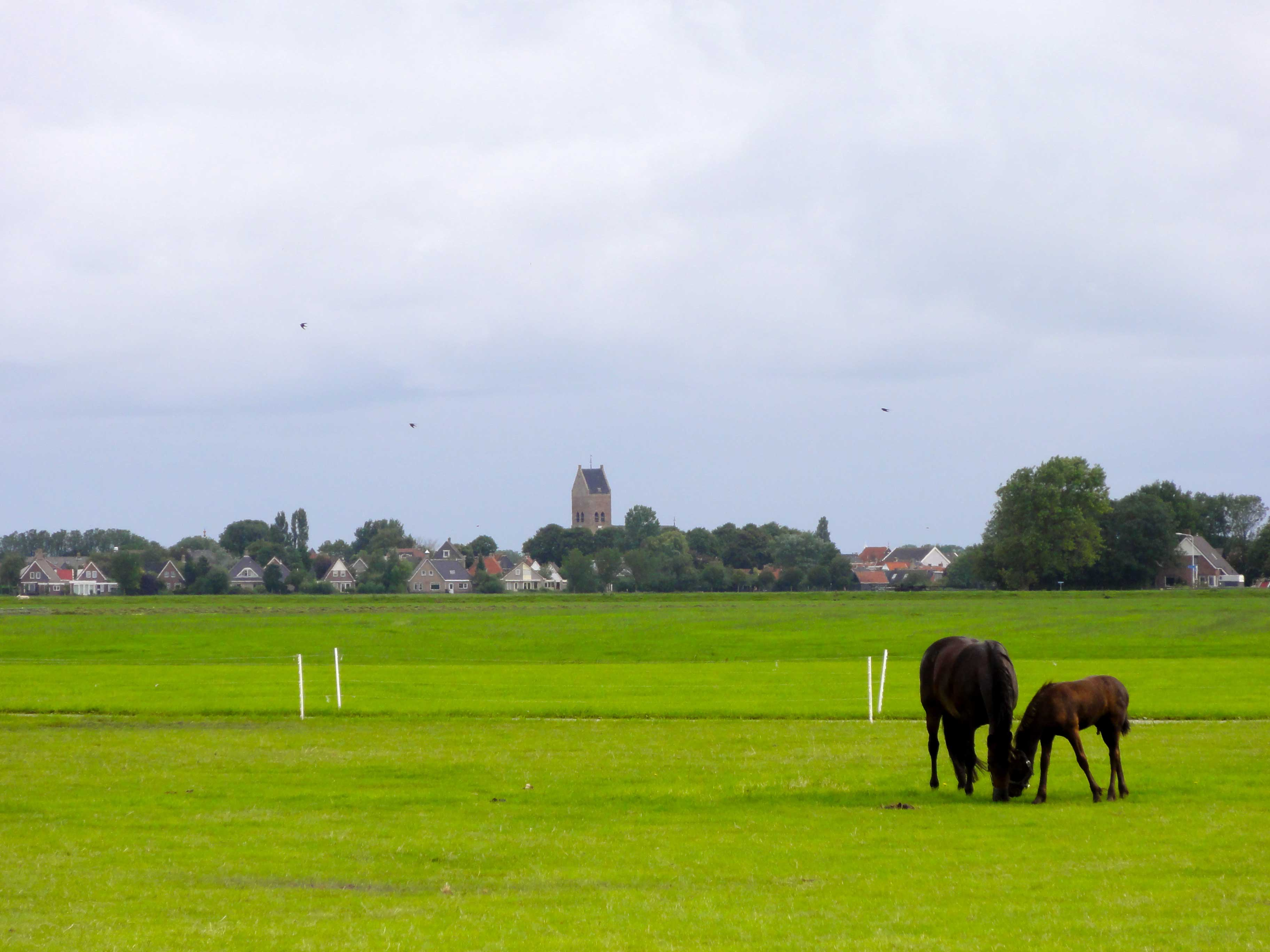
View on Pingjum

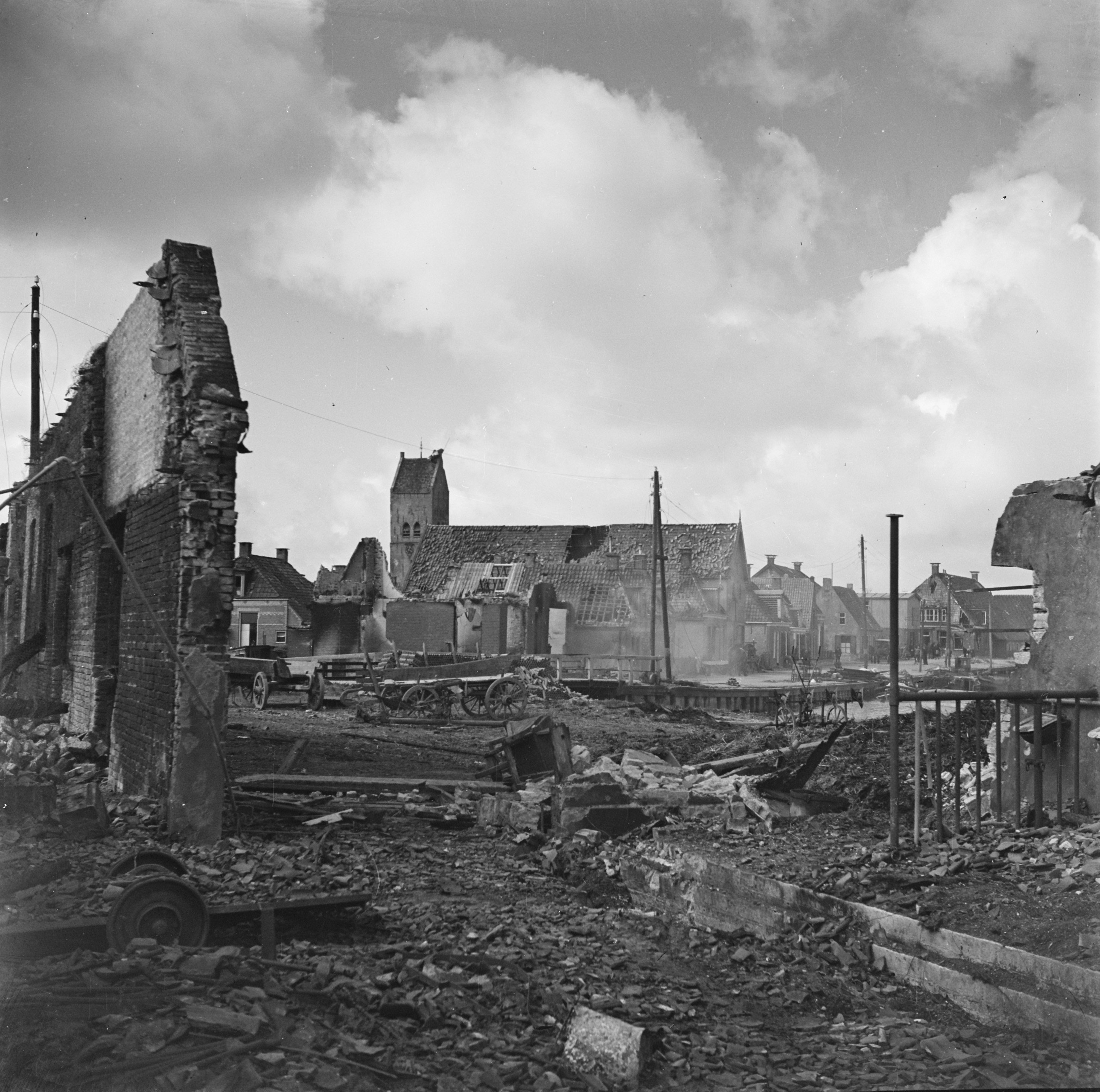
Destruction during World War II (18 April 1945)
