= Radboud Castle =

Castle in the Netherlands

- Kasteel Radboud
- Medemblik, North Holland
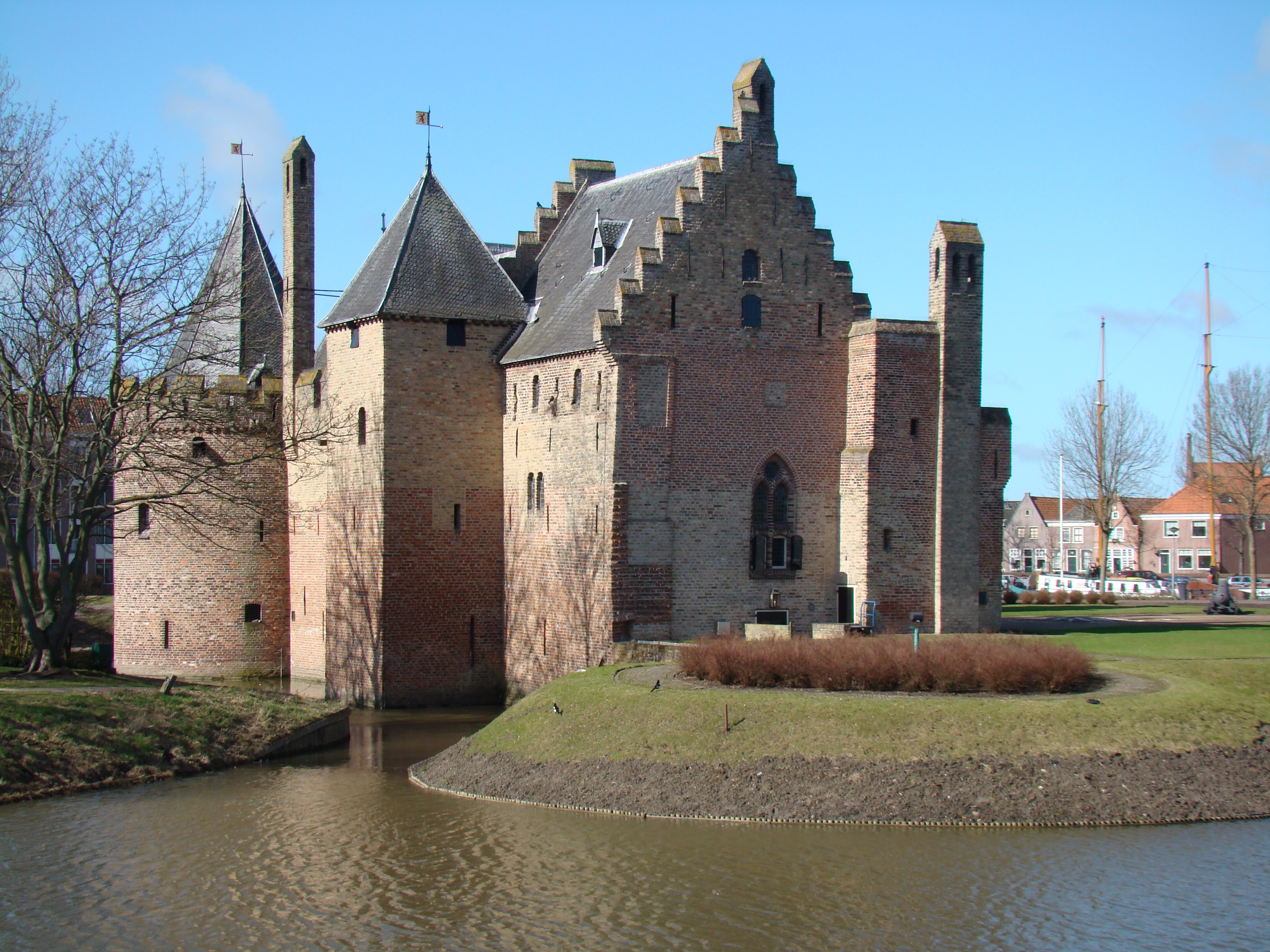
- Radboud Castle

Site information
- Type: dwangburcht
- Owner: Nederlandse staat, Rijksgebouwendienst
- Open to the public: Limited
- Condition: Intact, used as a museum

Location
- Coordinates: 52.7725°N 5.1131°E

Site history
- Built: 1288
- Built by: Floris V, Count of Holland
- Events: Second siege of Medemblik,

Radboud Castle (Dutch: Kasteel Radboud) is a castle on the east bank of the harbour in Medemblik.

Radboud Castle is one of a number of castles in North Holland. The building was commissioned by Floris V, Count of Holland. When exactly it was built is unknown, but the castle was completed before the St. Lucia's Flood of 13 December 1287.

On 24 June 1517 the castle saved some of the Medemblik townsfolk from the raids of Grutte Pier and his Arumer Zwarte Hoop (a band of marauding pirates).

On 12 August 1588 the castle surrendered to Diederik Sonoy and the Geuzen.

The defensive function of the castle was reduced with the building of walls around the city of Medemblik in 1572 and due to both dismantling and lack of maintenance there was attrition of the castle buildings.

== Restoration ==
In 1889 the control of the property was returned to the state. Restorations were done by the State architect J. van Lokhorst with advice from R.J.H. Cuypers and the castle was used for the district court of justice until 1934.

In 1931 a cannery near the castle burnt down exposing the foundations of a tower on the north west of the site and during 1936 the castle-moat was restored.

From 1964 to 1965 further restorations were done with a more historical and architectural correctness and some of the previous renovations were removed.

== Recent history ==
On 4 September 1939 The Night Watch by Rembrandt was stored here temporarily before being moved in May 1940 to a bunker in the dunes near Castricum.

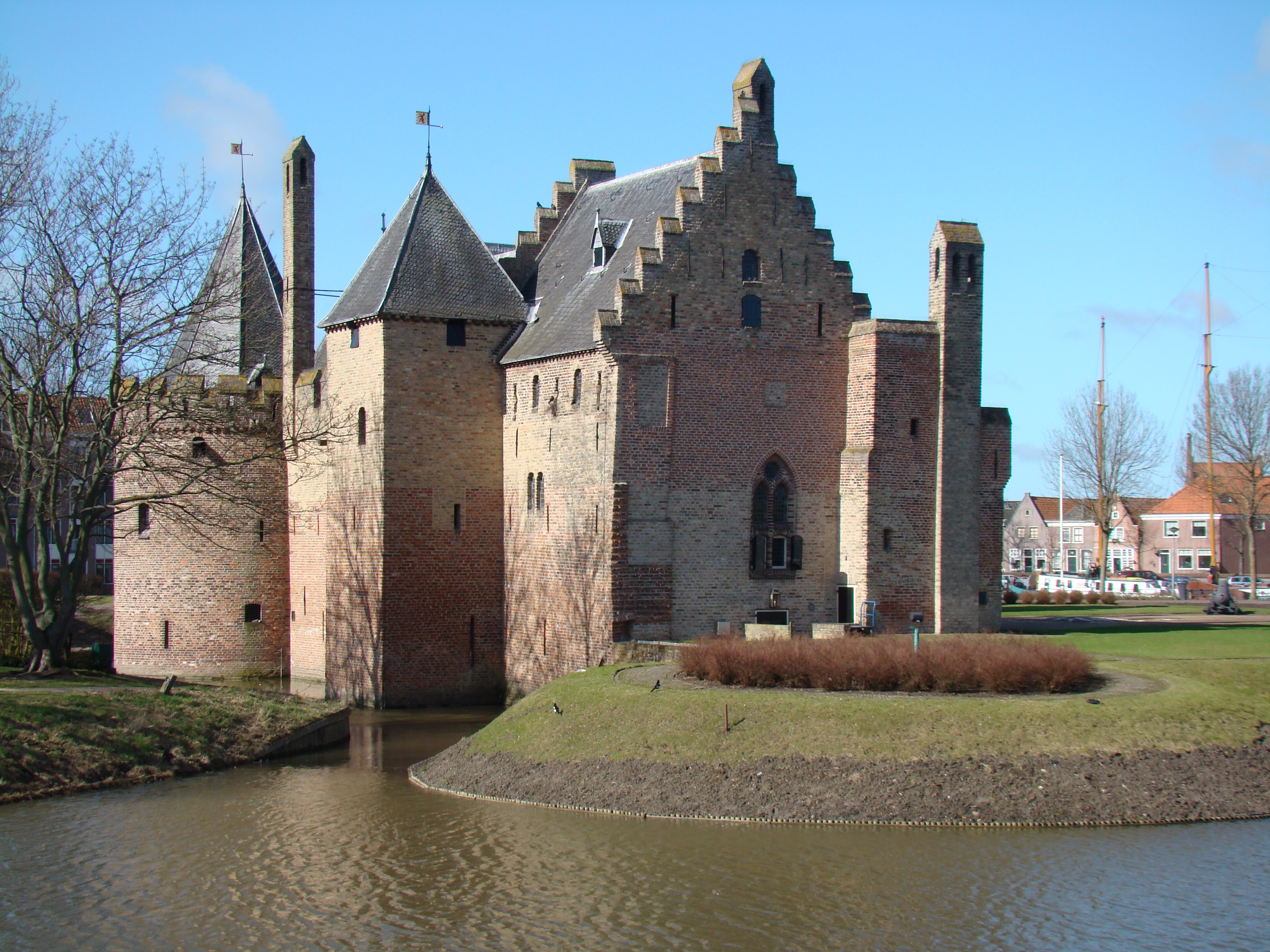

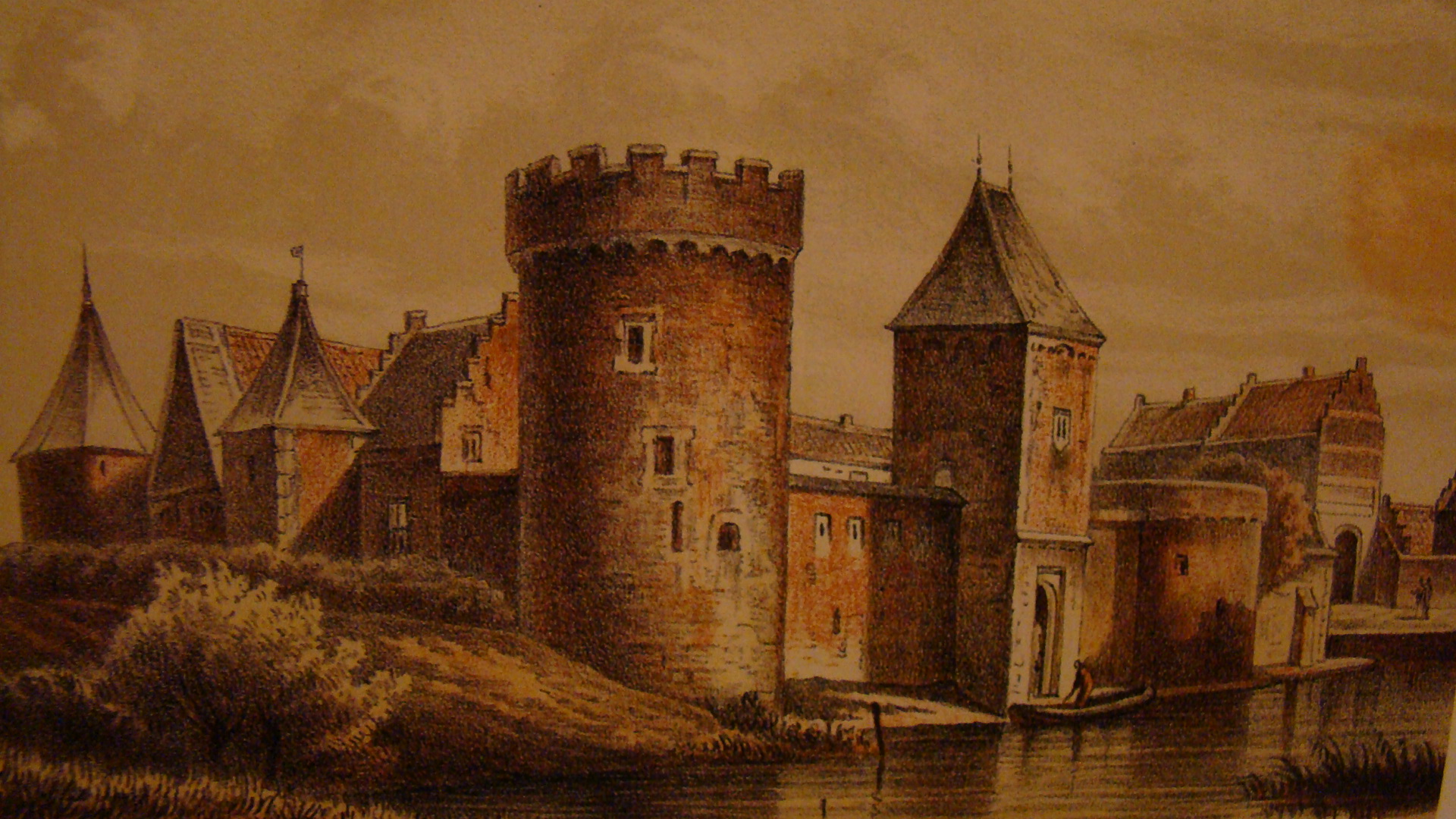

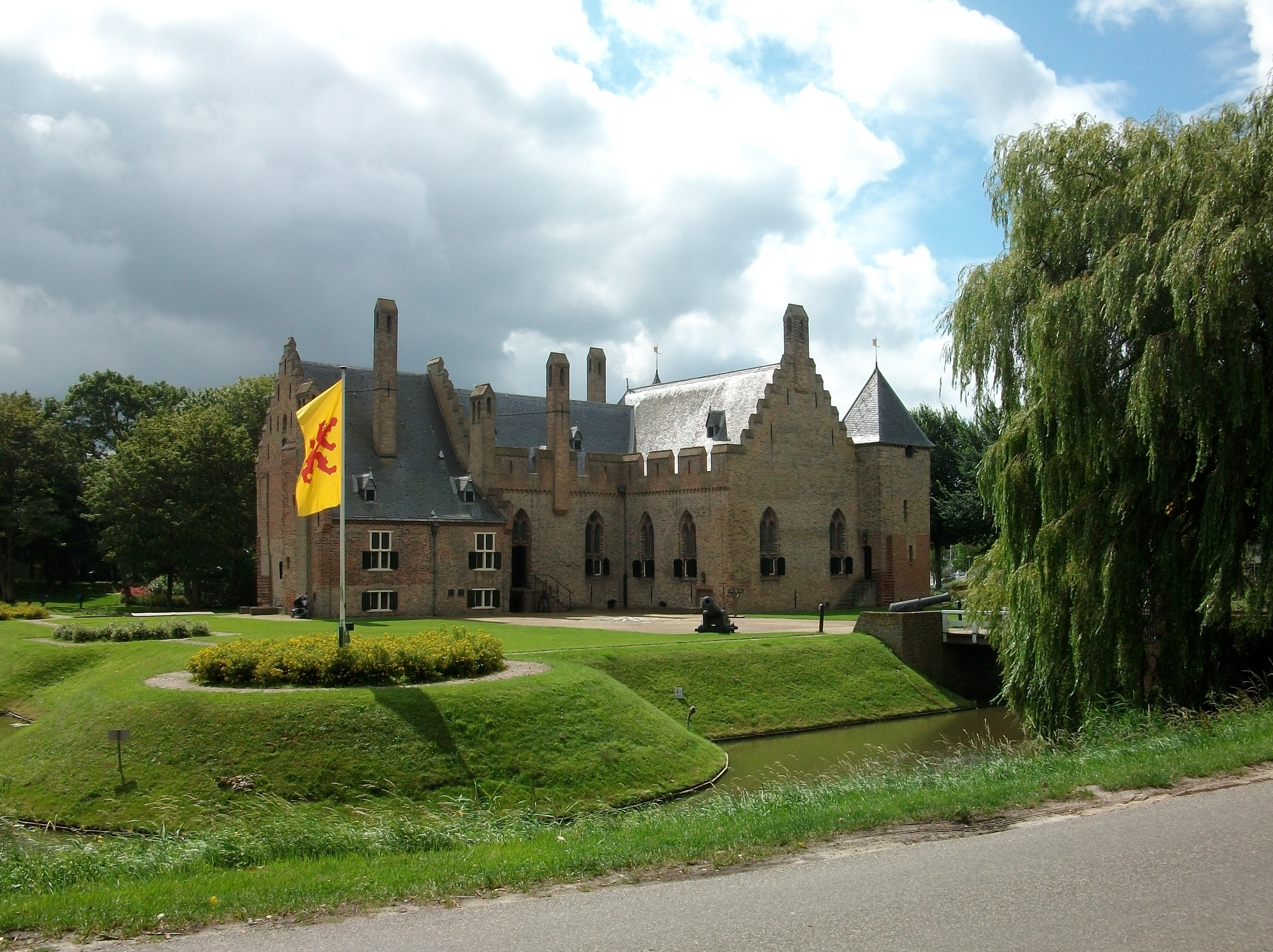
