= Wijerd Jelckama =

Dutch military commander (c. 1490–1523)

Wijerd Jelckama (also spelled Wierd and Wijard) (c. 1490– 7 July 1523) was a Frisian military commander, warlord and member of the Arumer Zwarte Hoop ("Arumer Black Heap"). He was the lieutenant of Pier Gerlofs Donia (also known as Grutte Pier) and fought alongside him against the Saxon and Hollandic invaders. Jelckama took Donia's place as a freedom fighter after Donia retired in 1519.

== Early life and family ==
Jelckama was born in the year 1490 in a large family of farmers and petty noblemen. He was descended from knights who had participated in the Crusades. One of his ancestors from his father's side of the family had died at the Siege of Antioch.

== Rebellion ==
Together with Pier Gerlofs Donia, Jelckama fought against the Saxon warriors that occupied their homeland of Frisia, at the capture of Medemblik, and in the siege of Middelburg castle.

In addition to the area occupied by the Saxons, parts of Frisia were conquered by Denmark, Holland, and local duchies. Donia and Jelckama's goal was to rid Frisia of all foreign powers and regain independence. Under the leadership of Donia, they used guerilla tactics and gained several victories, including the successful siege of two Hollandic castles and the city of Medemblik. Their greatest success, however, came at sea, where Donia and Jelckama sank 28 Dutch ships, earning Donia the title "Cross of the Dutchmen".

The rebels received financial support from Charles of Egmond, who claimed the Duchy of Guelders in opposition to the Habsburgs. Charles also used mercenaries under Maarten van Rossum in his support. However, when the tides turned against the rebels after 1520, Charles withdrew his support, and the rebels could no longer afford to pay their mercenary army. Around the same time, Arumer Zwarte Hoop also lost their leader. In 1519, Donia's health grew worse. He retired to his farm where he died in 1520. He was buried in Sneek in the 15th-century Groote Kerk (also called the Martinikerk).

Jelckama took over the command of the armies, then made up of over 4,000 soldiers. Jelckama also gained some minor victories, but proved to be a less competent commander and slowly lost men. Jelckama and his soldiers took part in acts of piracy and sacked many villages in the Frisian lands, losing the trust and support of their own people. The fact that Jelckama was less personable than Donia also cost him: he forged less fruitful alliances and lost more than he made. All this would lead to the defeat of Jelckama and his army.

== Death ==
After a series of defeats, he and what was left of the Frisian army were captured in 1523 and taken to the city of Leeuwarden in Frisia. There they were publicly beheaded. With the death of Jelckama and the rebels, the rebellion of Frisia came to an end. It was the last revolt in Frisian history and is remembered as such to this day.

== See also ==
- Charles, Duke of Guelders
- Friso-Hollandic Wars
- History of the Netherlands
- Pier Gerlofs Donia
- Rulers of Frisia
