= Erum =

Erum may refer to:

- Erum (name), Muslim name
- Episodic random utility model, a statistical model used for regression analysis.
