= Arumer Zwarte Hoop =

Military group from 1515 to 1523

Frisian peasant rebellion
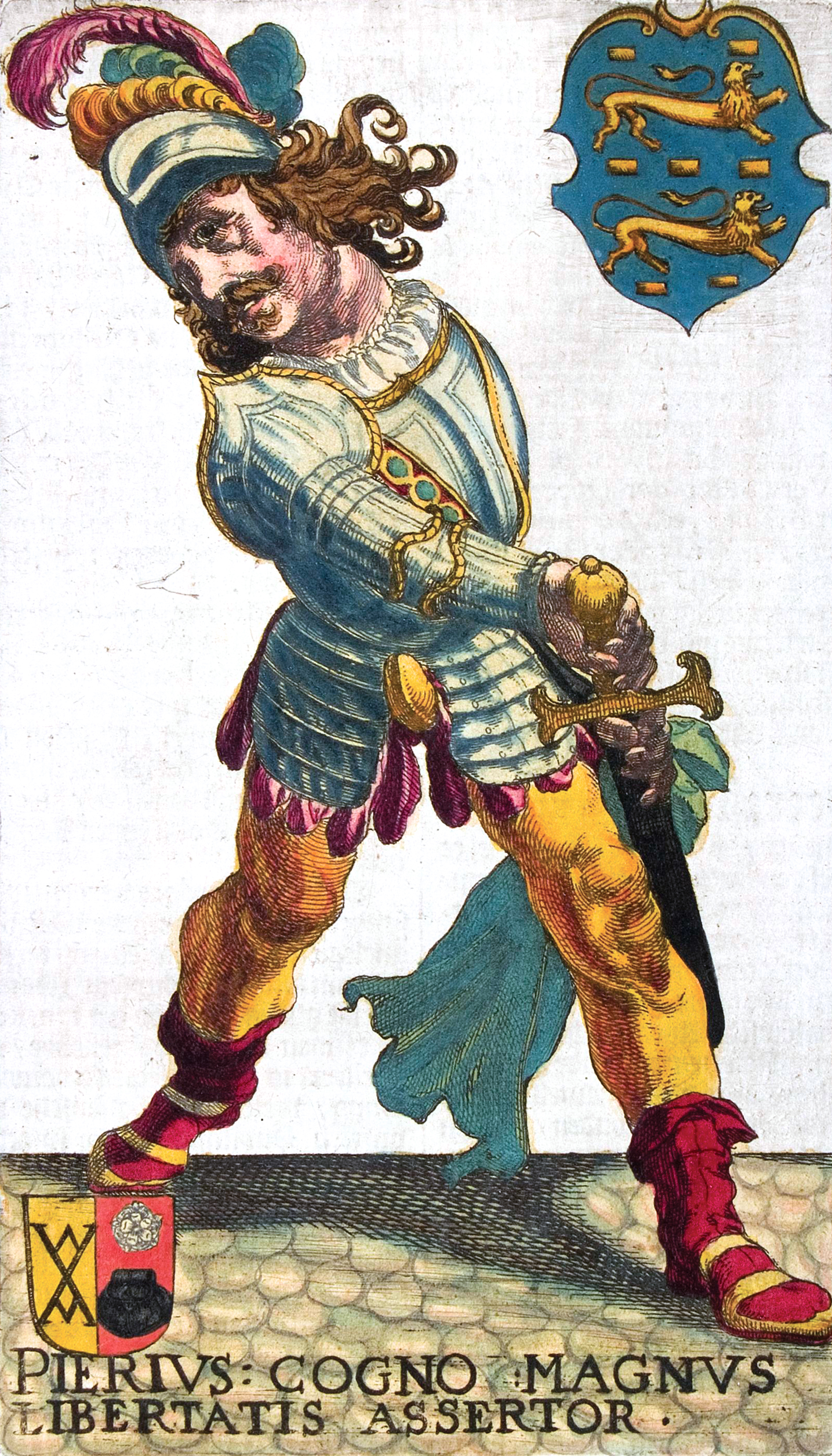
- Painting of Pier Gerlofs Donia, 1622
Date	1515–1523 (8 years)
Location	Friesland in what is now the Netherlands
Result	Suppression of the rebellion

Belligerents
Habsburg Netherlands	Arumer Zwarte Hoop Charles II, Duke of Guelders

Commanders and leaders
Charles V Margaret of Austria	Pier Gerlofs Donia; Wijerd Jelckama Maarten van Rossum

Strength
Unknown	4,000 (maximum)

The Arumer Zwarte Hoop, meaning "Black Army of Arum" (West Frisian: Swarte Heap) was an army of peasant rebels and mercenaries in Friesland fighting against the Habsburg authorities from 1515 to 1523. For four years they were successful under the former farmer Pier Gerlofs Donia. Led by his Lieutenant Wijerd Jelckama from 1519 they slowly lost ground and were captured and executed in 1523.

== Activities ==
=== Origin ===
The leader was the farmer Pier Gerlofs Donia, whose farm had been burned down and whose kinfolk had been killed by a marauding landsknecht regiment. Since the regiment had been employed by the Habsburg authorities to suppress the civil war of the Vetkopers and Schieringers, Donia put the blame on these authorities. After this he gathered angry peasants and some petty noblemen from Frisia and Gelderland and formed the Arumer Zwarte Hoop.

=== Success ===
Donia and Jelckama's goal was to liberate Frisia from all foreign powers and regain Frisian freedom. Under the leadership of Donia (nicknamed Greate Pier for his size), they employed guerrilla tactics and achieved several victories such as the successful siege of two Hollandic castles and the city of Medemblik. Donia also targeted ships that travelled the Zuiderzee and was very active in 1517, when he used his "signal ships" to attack ships in the region of the West Frisian coast, to which he also transported Geldrian forces, from the Duchy of Geldern, setting them ashore at Medemblik. Donia bore a personal enmity to Medemblik and its inhabitants as, in earlier years, soldiers from Medemblik had cooperated with the Dutch army commanded by Duke Charles, the future Emperor. Donia sank 28 Dutch ships, earning him the title "Cross of the Dutchmen".

The rebels also received financial support from Charles II, Duke of Guelders, who claimed the Duchy of Guelders in opposition to the House of Habsburg. Charles also employed mercenaries under the command of Maarten van Rossum in their support. However, when the tides turned against the rebels in 1519 as Charles withdrew his support, and by losing their financial support, the rebels could then no longer afford to pay their mercenary army. About the same time, the Arumer Zwarte Hoop also lost their leader, as Donia's health deteriorated. He retired to his farm where he died in 1520. He is buried in Sneek in the 15th-century Martinikerk (Sneek) (English: Large Church; also called the Martinikerk).

=== Defeat ===
Donia's Lieutenant Wijerd Jelckama took over the command of his forces, which then comprised over 4,000 soldiers. Jelckama also achieved some minor victories, but proved to be a less competent commander and slowly lost men. Jelckama and his soldiers indulged in acts of piracy and sacked many villages in the Frisian lands, losing the trust and support of their own people. The fact that Jelckama was less charismatic also cost him: he forged less fruitful alliances and lost more than he made. After a series of defeats, he and the remainder of the Frisian army were captured in 1523. Jelckama and the remaining Frisian and Gelderian rebels were decapitated, putting the rebellion to an end.

== See also ==
- Black Company
