= Ah-reum =

- Hangul: 아름
- RR: Areum
- MR: Arŭm
- IPA: [aɾɯm]

Ah-reum (Korean: 아름) is a Korean given name. The word itself is a native Korean word meaning "beauty" and does not have corresponding hanja. However, since Korean given names can be created arbitrarily, it may also be a name with hanja (e.g. 妸凜).

People with this name include:

- Hong Ah-reum (born 1989), South Korean actress
- Kwon Ah-reum (born 1996), South Korean actress
- Lee Ah-reum (born 1992), South Korean taekwondo athlete
- Na Ah-reum (born 1990), South Korean track and road bicycle racer
- Noh Ah-reum (born 1991), South Korean short track speed skater
- Shannon (South Korean singer) (born Shannon Arrum Williams, 1998), British streamer

== See also ==
- List of Korean given names
