= Arum, Netherlands =

Arum
- Village
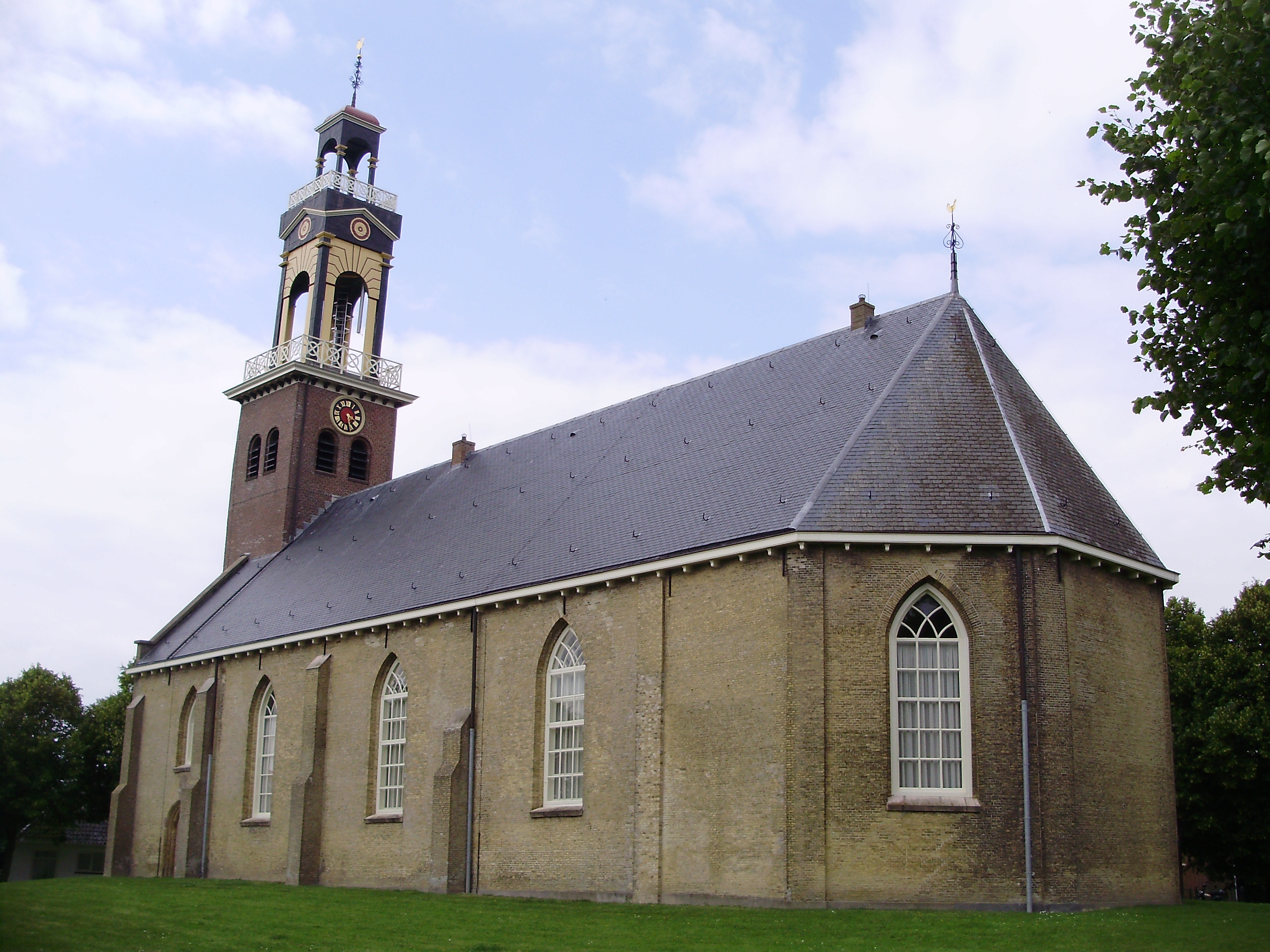
- Arum Dutch Reformed Church

- Flag Coat of arms

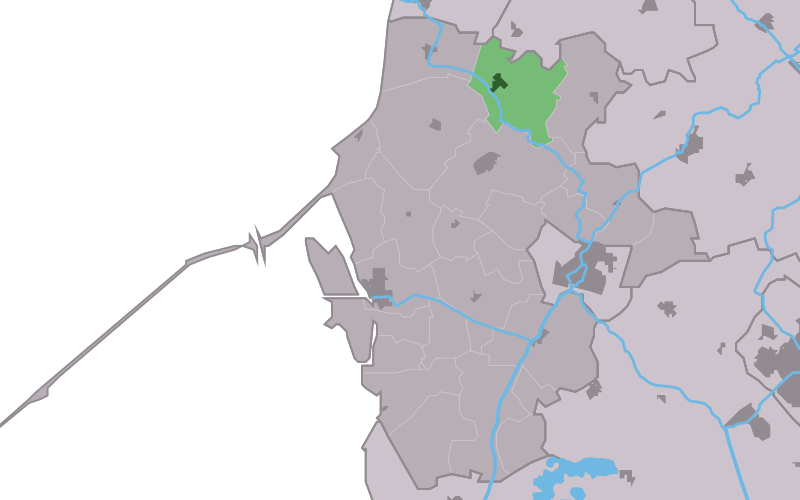
- Location in the former Wûnseradiel municipality

- Location in the Netherlands Arum (Netherlands)
- Coordinates: 53°07′47″N 5°28′31″E
- Country: Netherlands
- Province: Friesland
- Municipality: Súdwest-Fryslân

Area
  - Total: 9.77 km^{2} (3.77 sq mi)
- Elevation: 0.7 m (2.3 ft)

Population (2021)
  - Total: 1,055
  - Density: 108/km^{2} (280/sq mi)
- Time zone: UTC+1 (CET)
  - Summer (DST): UTC+2 (CEST)
- Postal code: 8822
- Dialing code: 0517

Arum is a village in the Súdwest-Fryslân municipality in the Dutch province of Friesland. It is about 5 km southeast of the city of Harlingen.

The village itself has about 895 inhabitants. The surrounding countryside that belongs to Arum, including the hamlets of Baarderburen and Grauwe Kat, has a population of about 180 in January 2017.

== History ==
The village was first mentioned around 1400 as Aeldrum, and could mean "settlement of Alder (person)". Arum is a terp (artificial living mound) village which dates from the beginning of the Christian era and was located at the Marneslenk.

In 1380, the Battle of Arum was fought near the village between the monks of the monasteries Ludingakerk (near Midlum) and Oldeklooster (near Hartwert), in which more than 130 men died.

The Arumer Zwarte Hoop (Black Hope of Arum) was an army of peasants and mercenaries led by Grutte Pier (Pier Gerlofs Donia) who revenged the failed attack of Holland on Friesland, and as a pirate army plundered and raided cities in Holland from 1515 until 1518. The peasant army was supported and financed by the Duke of Guelders.

The Dutch Reformed church used to date from 1664 or 1665 and had a tower from the late-12th century. In 1836, the church was struck by lightning and burnt down and was rebuilt the next year using many of the original stones.

Arum was home to 972 people in 1840. Up to 1850, the village was concentrated around the intersection of the canal to Franeker and the road from Harlingen to Bolsward. In 1850, the road was paved, and a linear settlement developed along the road. The former inn De Gekroonde Leeuw is a square villa from 1876 which used to double as a tram stop. Before 2011, the village was part of the Wûnseradiel municipality.

== Gallery ==
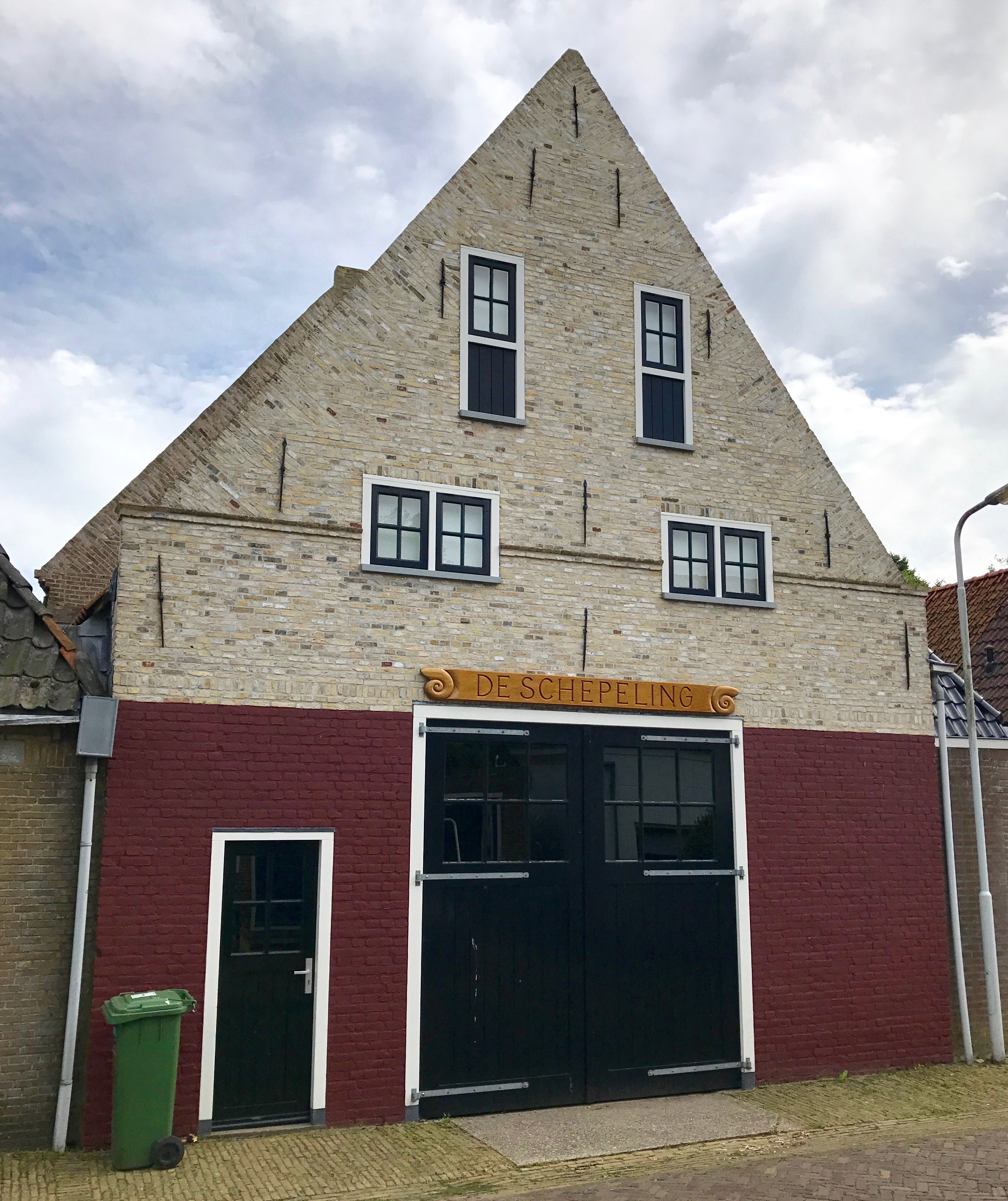
Warehouse "De Schepeling"

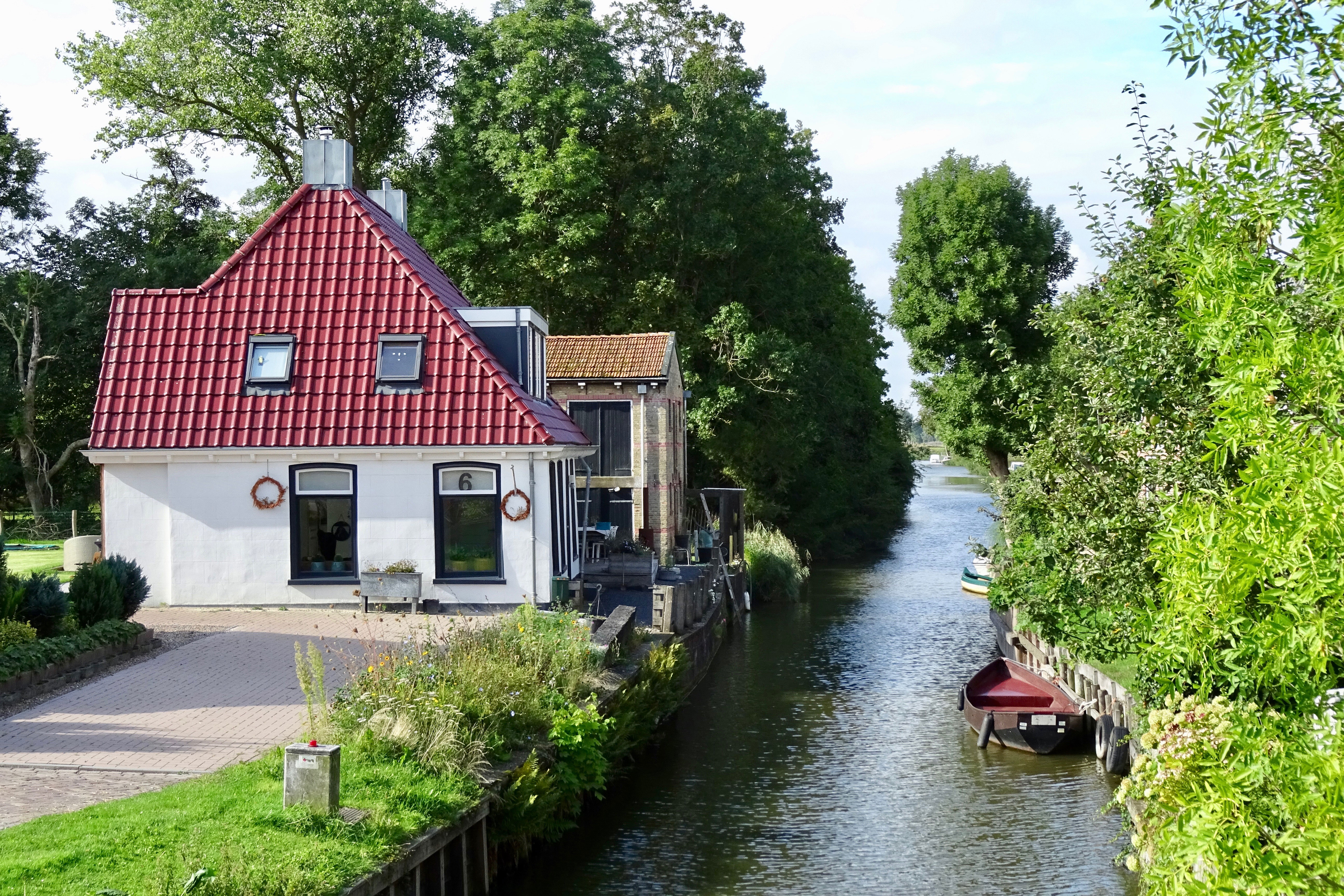
Canal view

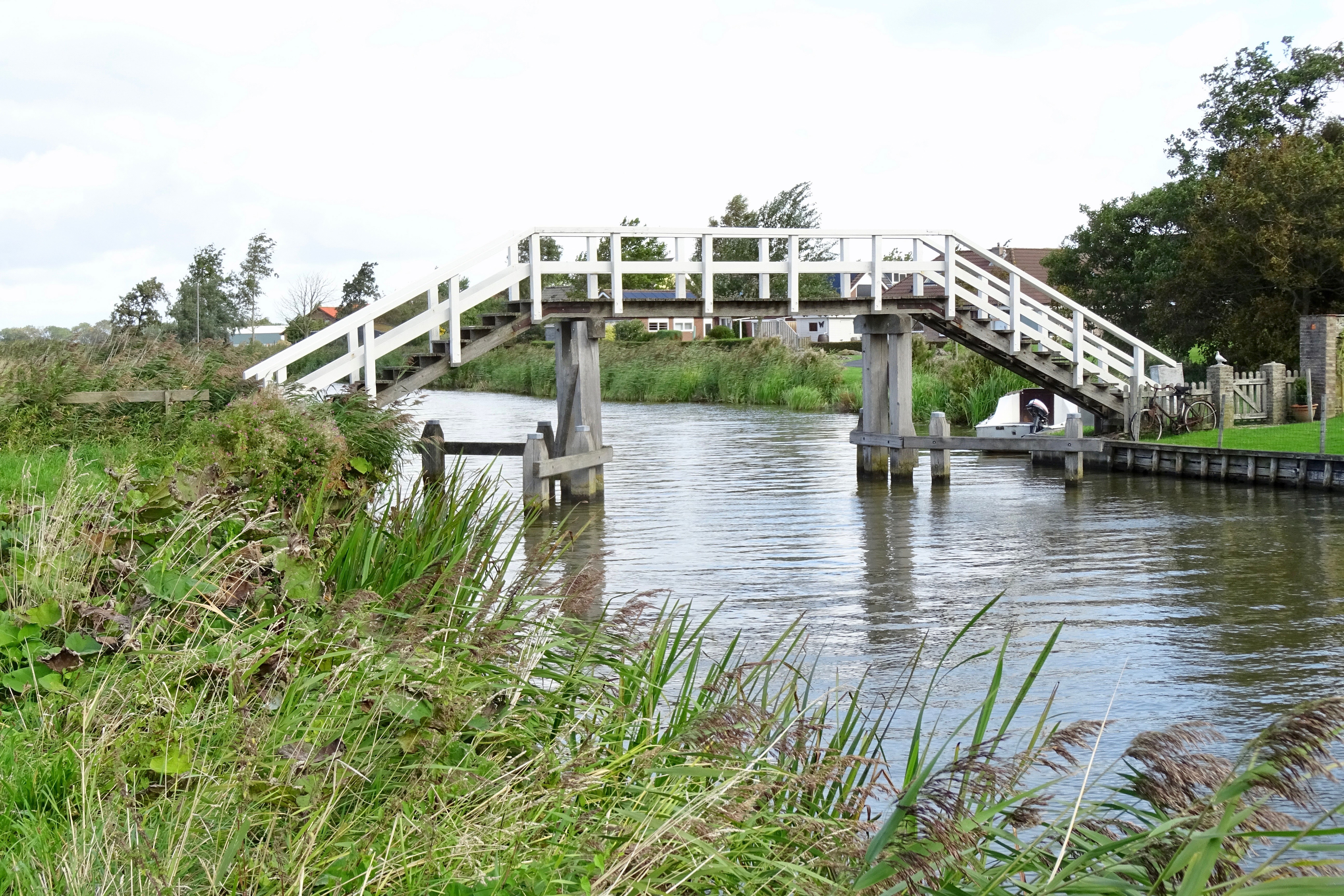
Little foot bridge

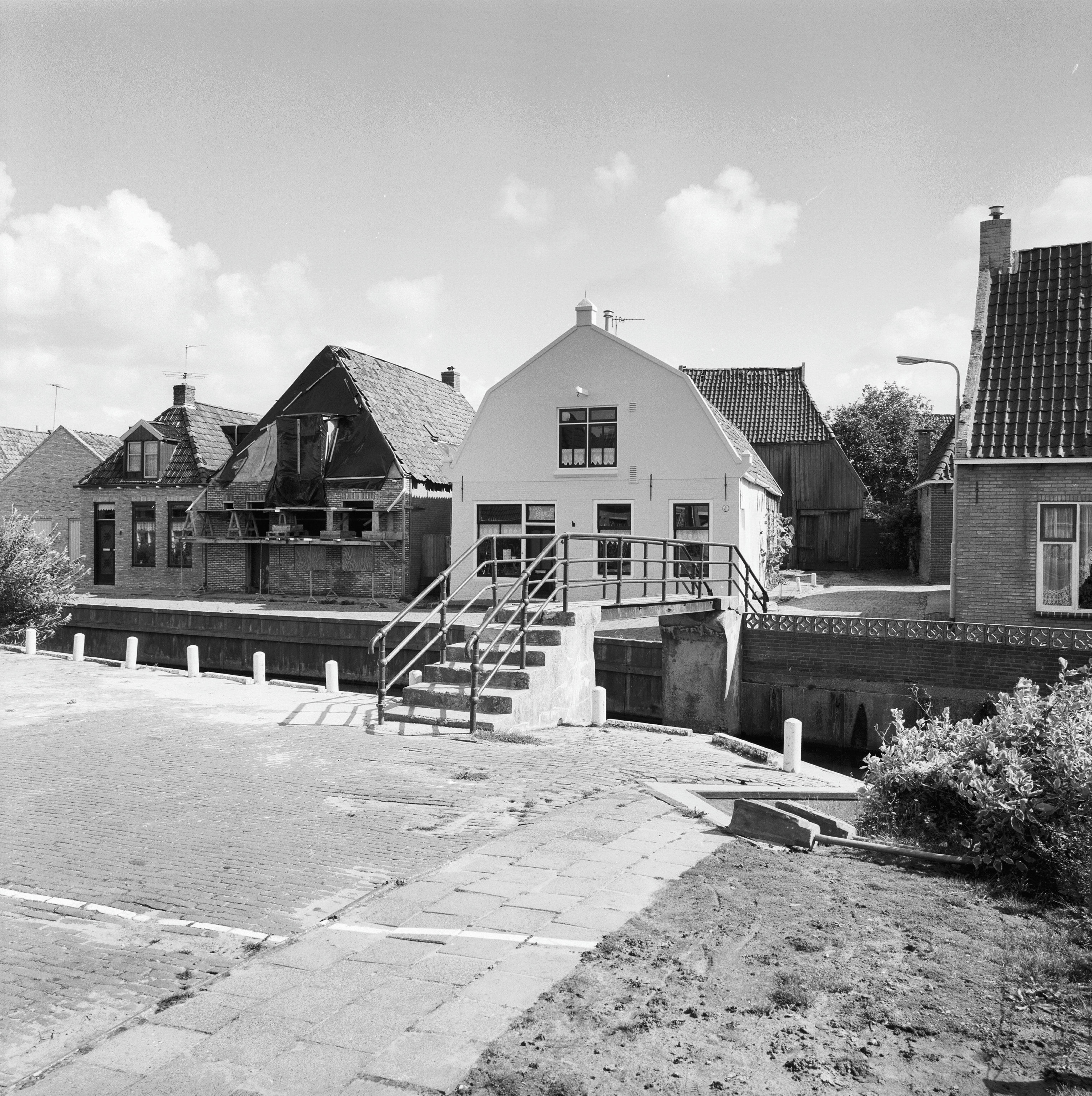
Street view (1982)
