= List of shipwrecks in 1969 =

The list of shipwrecks in 1969 includes ships sunk, foundered, grounded, or otherwise lost during 1969.

table of contents
1969
| Jan | Feb | Mar | Apr |
| May | Jun | Jul | Aug |
| Sep | Oct | Nov | Dec |
Unknown date

== January ==
=== 5 January ===
List of shipwrecks: 5 January 1969
| Ship | State | Description |
|---|---|---|
| Bolivar | Japan | The ore carrier broke in two and sank 170 nautical miles (310 km) off Cape Nojima, Japan with the loss of 31 of her 33 crew. |

=== 6 January ===
List of shipwrecks: 6 January 1969
| Ship | State | Description |
|---|---|---|
| Anastassia | Panama | The Liberty ship ran aground off Constanţa, Romania. She was declared a constructive total loss. |

=== 9 January ===
List of shipwrecks: 12 January 1969
| Ship | State | Description |
|---|---|---|
| Preveze | Turkey | The cargo ship caught fire off the Cape Verde Islands. She was on a voyage from Ashdod, Israel to Santos, Brazil. The fire was extinguished on 11 January and she was towed in to São Vicente, Cape Verde Islands by Cherniakovsk (Soviet Union). Preveze was declared a constructive total loss and consequently scrapped. |

=== 12 January ===
List of shipwrecks: 12 January 1969
| Ship | State | Description |
|---|---|---|
| Carmania | United Kingdom | The ocean liner ran aground off the Bahamas. The passengers were transferred to Flavia (Italy) and landed at Miami, Florida. Carmania was refloated on 17 January. |
| President Jefferson | United States | The cargo ship ran aground at 10°20′N 107°10′E. Refloated on 18 January with assistance from USS YLLC-5 (United States Navy). |

=== 31 January ===
List of shipwrecks: 31 January 1969
| Ship | State | Description |
|---|---|---|
| Sitka | United States | The fishing vessel was stranded on the beach and destroyed by fire 7 nautical miles (13 km; 8.1 mi) west-northwest of Point Astley (57°43′N 133°39′W) near the entrance to Holkham Bay in Southeast Alaska. |
| USS Sterlet | United States Navy | The decommissioned Balao-class submarine was sunk as a target by the submarine USS Sargo (United States Navy). |

=== Unknown date ===
List of shipwrecks: Unknown date January 1969
| Ship | State | Description |
|---|---|---|
| Njandoma | USSR | The freighter broke apart on Scharhörn with toxic chemicals on board on his voyage to England. The barrels could be salvaged from the halves of the ship. |
| Taishunhong | Somalia | The Liberty ship was damaged by fire at Dairen, China. She was declared a constructive total loss. |

== February ==
=== 1 February ===
List of shipwrecks: 1 February 1969
| Ship | State | Description |
|---|---|---|
| Kukuyoshi Maru No. 15 | Japan | The fishing vessel was wrecked on the coast of Rat Island in the Aleutian Islands. A United States Coast Guard helicopter rescued her crew. |

=== 6 February ===
List of shipwrecks: 6 February 1969
| Ship | State | Description |
|---|---|---|
| USS ATC-132-1 | United States Navy | The armoured troop carrier capsized off Vietnam. Salvaged by USS YLLC-5 (United States Navy) and floating crane YD-220 and refloated the next day. |
| USS Redfish | United States Navy | The decommissioned Balao-class auxiliary submarine was sunk as a target in the Pacific Ocean off San Diego, California, by the auxiliary submarine USS Medregal (United States Navy). |

=== 9 February ===
List of shipwrecks: 9 February 1969
| Ship | State | Description |
|---|---|---|
| London II | Greece | The motor vessel foundered off Moni, Cyprus. |

=== 10 February ===
List of shipwrecks: 10 February 1969
| Ship | State | Description |
|---|---|---|
| Lukia M | Greece | The cargo ship sprang a leak off Barren Island in the South China Sea (29°29′N 124°16′E) and was abandoned. She was towed to Shanghai and seized by the Chinese Government. |

=== 11 February ===
List of shipwrecks: 11 February 1969
| Ship | State | Description |
|---|---|---|
| USS PTC-71 | United States Navy | The torpedo patrol boat was sunk by an enemy missile near Mui Boi Bung, Vietnam. Salvaged the next day and towed to Vũng Tàu by USS Pivot (United States Navy). |

=== 12 February ===
List of shipwrecks: 12 February 1969
| Ship | State | Description |
|---|---|---|
| Flying Petrel | United Kingdom | The tug ran aground at Cape Kaliakra, Romania and was abandoned. She was on a voyage from Piraeus, Greece to Sulina, Romania. |

=== 13 February ===
List of shipwrecks: 13 February 1969
| Ship | State | Description |
|---|---|---|
| HMAS Arunta | Royal Australian Navy | The decommissioned Tribal-class destroyer capsized and sank in the Tasman Sea off Australia's Broken Bay while under tow to a scrapyard. |
| Oceanic Ondine | United States | The Victory ship was driven from her moorings at Galveston, Texas and collided with the Victory ship Wellesley Victory (United States). |

=== 16 February ===
List of shipwrecks: 16 February 1969
| Ship | State | Description |
|---|---|---|
| Antonios P | Greece | The coaster ran aground off Ravenna, Italy. She was on a voyage from Lattakia to Ravenna. She was refloated on 11 March and towed to Ravenna. Consequently scrapped.6> |

=== 24 February ===
List of shipwrecks: 24 February 1969
| Ship | State | Description |
|---|---|---|
| Sevilla | West Germany | The cargo ship sank in the Elbe following a collision with Nette Skou (Denmark). All fifteen crew rescued by a West German fireboat. |

== March ==
=== 1 March ===
List of shipwrecks: 1 March 1969
| Ship | State | Description |
|---|---|---|
| USS Day | United States Navy | The decommissioned Rudderow-class destroyer escort was sunk as a target in the Pacific Ocean off San Clemente Island, California. |

=== 8 March ===
List of shipwrecks: 8 March 1969
| Ship | State | Description |
|---|---|---|
| Martindale | United States | The motor vessel was wrecked in Surf Bay (54°10′N 165°37′W) on the southwest coast of Akun Island in the Aleutian Islands. |

=== 11 March ===
List of shipwrecks: 11 March 1969
| Ship | State | Description |
|---|---|---|
| Shun Tai | Somalia | The cargo ship collided in the Singapore Strait 3 nautical miles (5.6 km) south of Singapore with World Carrier (Flag unknown) and sank. Shun Tai was on a voyage from Canton, China to Colombo, Ceylon.> |

=== 14 March ===
List of shipwrecks: 14 March 1969
| Ship | State | Description |
|---|---|---|
| Vainqueur | Liberia | The cargo ship suffered an explosion in her engine room and sank in the Gulf of Mexico. All 35 crew were rescued. |

=== 19 March ===
List of shipwrecks: 19 March 1969
| Ship | State | Description |
|---|---|---|
| Garden City | Liberia | The cargo ship sank after colliding with Zagłębie Dąbrowskie (Poland) in foggy weather off Margate, Kent. |

=== 21 March ===
List of shipwrecks: 21 March 1969
| Ship | State | Description |
|---|---|---|
| Iolite | South Africa | The fishing trawler was scuttled off the coast of South Africa.> |
| Navena | South Africa | The stripped, out-of-service 136.1-foot (41.5 m), 361-ton trawler was scuttled in the Irvin Johnson artificial reef in False Bay. |

=== 25 March ===
List of shipwrecks: 25 March 1969
| Ship | State | Description |
|---|---|---|
| Samuel S | Liberia | The Liberty ship ran aground on Kuchinoerabu Island, Japan (30°25′N 130°14′E) and broke in two. She was on a voyage from Guam, Marshall Islands to Pusan, South Korea. |

=== 26 March ===
List of shipwrecks: 26 March 1969
| Ship | State | Description |
|---|---|---|
| USS Charles F. Hughes | United States Navy | The decommissioned Benson-class destroyer was sunk as a target in the Atlantic Ocean off the coast of Virginia. |

=== 27 March ===
List of shipwrecks: 27 March 1969
| Ship | State | Description |
|---|---|---|
| Yavari | Argentina | The Victory ship sank in the Pacific Ocean 1,000 nautical miles (1,900 km) south west of San Francisco, California, United States. She was on a voyage from Los Angeles, California to a Taiwanese port for scrapping. |

=== 28 March ===
List of shipwrecks: 28 March 1969
| Ship | State | Description |
|---|---|---|
| Nyleve | Panama | The former fisheries research ship Albatross III was wrecked on Roman Key, Cuba. |

=== 29 March ===
List of shipwrecks: 29 March 1969
| Ship | State | Description |
|---|---|---|
| James Barrie | United Kingdom | The trawler ran aground on Louther Rock on 27 March. She drifted off on 29 March and was taken under tow but sank in Hoxa Sound, Scapa Flow, Orkney Islands. Most brass items have been salvaged. |

=== Unknown date ===
List of shipwrecks: Unknown date in March 1969
| Ship | State | Description |
|---|---|---|
| Irene | Liberia | The cargo ship ran aground off South Ronaldsay, Orkney Islands, United Kingdom. |
| Irving Walnut | Canada | The Maple type tug was scuttled off the east coast of Canada. |
| Miss Kay | South Vietnam | The tug foundered off the mouth of the Soi Rap River. Refloated on 21 March. |
| USS M 111-1 | United States Navy | The landing craft mechanized capsized off South Vietnam. She was salvaged on 19 April and towed to Nha Be, South Vietnam, by the light salvage lift craft USS YLLC-5 (United States Navy) the next day. |
| Poseidon | Panama | The vessel ran aground off the Italian coast. Repairs uneconomic and the ship was subsequently scrapped. |

== April ==
=== 3 April ===
List of shipwrecks: 3 April 1969
| Ship | State | Description |
|---|---|---|
| USS Tills | United States Navy | The decommissioned Cannon-class destroyer escort was sunk as a target in the Atlantic Ocean off the coast of Virginia. |

=== 4 April ===
List of shipwrecks: 4 April 1969
| Ship | State | Description |
|---|---|---|
| Pacstar | Liberia | The Liberty ship ran aground in Tokyo Bay, a total loss. She was on a voyage from Kure, Japan to Portland, Oregon, United States. |
| Pelican | United States | The motor vessel sank in the Gulf of Alaska south of Yakutat, Alaska. |
| Sad El Furat | Egypt | War of Attrition: The tanker, blocked in the Suez Canal, Egypt, was shelled by Israeli Army artillery, and later sank about 11 April. |

=== 6 April ===
List of shipwrecks: 6 April 1969
| Ship | State | Description |
|---|---|---|
| Union Faith | Republic of China | Union Faith on fire in New Orleans The cargo ship was in collision with oil barges on the Mississippi. The ship was engulfed in flames and sank, with the loss of 25 persons, including all on the bridge. |

=== 11 April ===
List of shipwrecks: 11 April 1969
| Ship | State | Description |
|---|---|---|
| Alfonso Tercero | Spain | The coaster sank 5 nautical miles (9.3 km) north of the Noordhinder Lightship, off the Netherlands following a collision with Brasilia (Sweden) in foggy weather. All crew were rescued by Brasilia. |

=== 18 April ===
List of shipwrecks: 18 April 1969
| Ship | State | Description |
|---|---|---|
| Vigia | United Kingdom | The supply vessel sank in the North Sea. All three crew were rescued by a Dutch trawler and landed in the Netherlands. |

=== 29 April ===
List of shipwrecks: 29 April 1969
| Ship | State | Description |
|---|---|---|
| USS ASPB 132-1 | United States Navy | The assault support patrol boat struck a mine in the Song Cai Tu River, Vietnam and sank. Salvaged on 1 May. |

=== Unknown date ===
List of shipwrecks: Unknown April 1969
| Ship | State | Description |
|---|---|---|
| Patrice Lumumba | PAIGC | Guinea-Bissau War of Independence: The transport boat was sunk by Portuguese action sometime in April. |

== May ==
=== 1 May ===
List of shipwrecks: 1 May 1969
| Ship | State | Description |
|---|---|---|
| Manana II | United States | The charter vessel sank near Sitka, Alaska, after striking a snag. All seven people on board survived. |

=== 7 May ===
List of shipwrecks: 7 May 1969
| Ship | State | Description |
|---|---|---|
| Capetan Panaos | Panama | The cargo ship ran aground in the Black Sea at Kilyos, Turkey. Refloated on 22 May and beached at Büyükdere. Refloated on 9 August, subsequently sold for scrapping. |

=== 10 May ===
List of shipwrecks: 10 May 1969
| Ship | State | Description |
|---|---|---|
| Louis B | United States | The motor vessel was destroyed by fire at Nushagak, Alaska. |

=== 15 May ===
List of shipwrecks: 15 May 1969
| Ship | State | Description |
|---|---|---|
| USCGC Casco | United States Coast Guard | The decommissioned Casco-class cutter was sunk as a target by two torpedo hits in the North Atlantic Ocean at 36°40′00″N 024°16′00″W. |
| USS Guitarro | United States Navy | Guitarro after sinking. The Sturgeon-class submarine sank at Mare Island Naval Shipyard, Vallejo, California due to errors in the management of her ballast tanks. Refloated on 18 May, but commissioning delayed by 32 months whilst repairs were carried out. |

=== 16 May ===
List of shipwrecks: 16 May 1969
| Ship | State | Description |
|---|---|---|
| Teunika | Netherlands | The 112-foot (34 m) coaster sprung a leak and lost power 10 miles north west of Tobermory. She was taken under tow by trawler "Corena" (United Kingdom), after taking off her crew, but sank eleven miles west of Tobermory (56°36′N 6°23′W) in 76-metre (249 ft) of water. |

=== 20 May ===
List of shipwrecks: 20 May 1969
| Ship | State | Description |
|---|---|---|
| Seiho Maru | Japan | The coaster sank after a collision with Energy Evolution (Liberia) off Nagasaki. Four of her thirteen crew were killed and two others reported missing. |

=== 23 May ===
List of shipwrecks: 23 May 1969
| Ship | State | Description |
|---|---|---|
| Carol Irene | United States | The motor vessel was wrecked at Cordova, Alaska. |

=== 26 May ===
List of shipwrecks: 26 May 1969
| Ship | State | Description |
|---|---|---|
| Tayo Maru | Japan | The trawler sank in a collision with a Soviet patrol boat. Eight crew rescued. |

=== 27 May ===
List of shipwrecks: 27 May 1969
| Ship | State | Description |
|---|---|---|
| Guadina | Portugal | Guinea-Bissau War of Independence: The sailing boat was sunk by PAIGC mine. Five crewmen killed, eight wounded. |

=== Unknown date ===
List of shipwrecks: Unknown date 1969
| Ship | State | Description |
|---|---|---|
| USS PBR 7520 | United States Navy | The river patrol boat was hit by two rockets and beached on fire. Equipment salvaged by USS YLLC-1 (United States Navy) and delivered to Nha Be, Vietnam. |

== June ==
=== 3 June ===
List of shipwrecks: 3 June 1969
| Ship | State | Description |
|---|---|---|
| USS Frank E. Evans | United States Navy | USS Frank E. Evans after the collision with HMAS Melbourne The Allen M. Sumner-class destroyer was cut in two in a collision with HMAS Melbourne (Royal Australian Navy) in the South China Sea. The bow section sank, whilst the stern section remained afloat. Seventy-four crew killed on board Frank E. Evans. |

=== 7 June ===
List of shipwrecks: 7 June 1969
| Ship | State | Description |
|---|---|---|
| Cape Uganik | United States | The motor vessel was destroyed by a storm in Kanatak Lagoon (57°31′N 156°02′W) on the south coast of the Alaska Peninsula in Alaska. |
| Phong Chau | South Vietnam | Vietnam War:The cargo ship was sunk by rockets at Đà Nẵng, South Vietnam. Later raised and broken up. |

=== 16 June ===
List of shipwrecks: 16 June 1969
| Ship | State | Description |
|---|---|---|
| Maringa | Brazil | The Liberty ship foundered off the coast of Brazil (11°30′S 37°15′W). |
| ROCS Mei HUA | Republic of China Navy | The Mei Chin-class LSM sank after colliding with MS Ta Tung. |

=== 17 June ===
List of shipwrecks: 17 June 1969
| Ship | State | Description |
|---|---|---|
| Sitakund | Norway | The stern section, which had been beached off Eastbourne, Sussex, refloated itself, drifted past Eastbourne Pier and ran aground to the east of the town. |

=== 19 June ===
List of shipwrecks: 19 June 1969
| Ship | State | Description |
|---|---|---|
| Falcon | United States | The motor vessel was destroyed by fire in the harbor at Sand Point, Alaska. |

=== 20 June ===
List of shipwrecks: 20 June 1969
| Ship | State | Description |
|---|---|---|
| Victoria Bay | Hong Kong | The cargo ship ran aground at Chittagong, India. She was on a voyage from Chittagong to Chalna, East Pakistan. She was refloated on 6 July. Repairs were deemed uneconomic and she was consequently scrapped. |

=== 24 June ===
List of shipwrecks: 24 June 1969
| Ship | State | Description |
|---|---|---|
| USS Beale | United States Navy | The decommissioned Fletcher-class destroyer was sunk as a target in the Atlantic Ocean 250 nautical miles (463 km) east of the mouth of the Chesapeake Bay. |
| USS Richard S. Bull | United States Navy | The decommissioned John C. Butler-class destroyer escort was sunk as a target in the Pacific Ocean off the coast of California. |

=== 25 June ===
List of shipwrecks: 25 June 1969
| Ship | State | Description |
|---|---|---|
| Andromachi | Greece | War of Attrition: The cargo ship, blocked in the Suez Canal, Egypt, was shelled by Israeli Army artillery, set on fire, and then sank and was abandoned. She was scrapped at Adabiya in March 1976. |
| Captain George K | Liberia | The Liberty ship suffered a fractured hull in the Indian Ocean. She was declared a constructive total loss. |
| Selena | United States | The motor vessel sank in the Gulf of Alaska south of Yakutat, Alaska. |

=== 26 June ===
List of shipwrecks: 26 June 1969
| Ship | State | Description |
|---|---|---|
| Aghia Trias | Panama | War of Attrition: The cargo ship, blocked in the Suez Canal, Egypt, was shelled by Israeli Army artillery, set on fire, and sank. |
| Marhonda | Panama | War of Attrition: The cargo ship, blocked in the Suez Canal, Egypt, was shelled by Israeli Army artillery, set on fire, and then sank and was abandoned; then further damaged in an aircraft bomb on 1 July. |

=== 27 June ===
List of shipwrecks: 27 June 1969
| Ship | State | Description |
|---|---|---|
| USS Snowden | United States Navy | The decommissioned Edsall-class destroyer escort was sunk as a target. |

=== 28 June ===
List of shipwrecks: 28 June 1969
| Ship | State | Description |
|---|---|---|
| Becky Thatcher | United States | The historic sternwheel texas-deck paddle steamer, operating as a stationary showboat theater, broke her moorings on the Mississippi River at St. Louis, Missouri, during a severe storm with high winds and drifted several miles downstream with about a hundred restaurant patrons aboard before crashing into a dock on the Illinois side of the river. The restaurant patrons were taken off safely by the towboat Larrayne Andress (United States). Becky Thatcher was repaired and eventually reopened for business in 1977 on the Muskingum River at Marietta, Georgia. |

=== 29 June ===
List of shipwrecks: 29 June 1969
| Ship | State | Description |
|---|---|---|
| Sincere | Netherlands | The cargo ship burned and sank off Bunguran Island, Indonesia. |

== July ==
=== 4 July ===
List of shipwrecks: 4 July 1969
| Ship | State | Description |
|---|---|---|
| USS Witek | United States Navy | The decommissioned Gearing-class destroyer was sunk as a target in the Atlantic Ocean off Virginia. |

=== 10 July ===
List of shipwrecks: 10 July 1969
| Ship | State | Description |
|---|---|---|
| K 9 | United States | A storm destroyed the motor vessel in Bristol Bay off Cape Greig on the coast of the Alaska Peninsula in Alaska. |

=== 16 July ===
List of shipwrecks: 16 July 1969
| Ship | State | Description |
|---|---|---|
| USS Manta | United States Navy | The decommissioned Balao-class submarine was sunk in the Atlantic Ocean off Hampton Roads, Virginia, as a target for aircraft. |
| USS Tullibee | United States Navy | The decommissioned Balao-class submarine was sunk as a target in the Atlantic Ocean off Norfolk, Virginia. |

=== 19 July ===
List of shipwrecks: 19 July 1969
| Ship | State | Description |
|---|---|---|
| TRP-1281 | USSR | The fishing boat capsized and sank between Aegna and Prangli islands in Northern Estonia with the loss of 12 passengers of her 36 passengers and 2 crew. |

=== 20 July ===
List of shipwrecks: 20 July 1969
| Ship | State | Description |
|---|---|---|
| Bull Moose | United States | The 47-foot (14.3 m) purse seiner capsized and sank with the loss of two lives in Glacier Bay in Southeast Alaska near Point Gustavus (58°23′N 135°55′W) in Icy Strait in the Alexander Archipelago. Another fishing vessel rescued her four survivors. |
| Eastern Star | United Kingdom | The refrigerated cargo ship was severely damaged by fire and was declared a constructive total loss. |

=== 21 July ===
List of shipwrecks: 21 July 1969
| Ship | State | Description |
|---|---|---|
| Discoverer | United States | The passenger and freight boat was wrecked in Cordova Bay off Sukkwan Island in the Alexander Archipelago in Southeast Alaska after her engine broke down. All on board survived. |

=== 23 July ===
List of shipwrecks: 23 July 1969
| Ship | State | Description |
|---|---|---|
| Ocean Surf | South Africa | The 92.16-foot (28.09 m), 131-ton trawler ran aground off Natal, South Africa, a total loss. |

=== 25 July ===
List of shipwrecks: 25 July 1969
| Ship | State | Description |
|---|---|---|
| Silja | Norway | The tanker sank following a collision with Ville de Majunga (France) off Toulon, France. Two crew killed and a further eighteen reported missing. |

=== Unknown date ===
List of shipwrecks: Unknown date 1969
| Ship | State | Description |
|---|---|---|
| HQ-1224 | Republic of Vietnam Navy | The armored troop carrier sank at Ta Cru, South Vietnam. Salvaged on 31 July by USS CSB-2 (United States Navy). |
| USS Richey | United States Navy | The decommissioned Edsall-class destroyer escort was sunk as a target in the Pacific Ocean off California. |
| Wenny | Norway | The ore carrier capsized and sank off the coast of Norway with the loss of nine of her crew. |

== August ==
=== 1 August ===
List of shipwrecks: 1 August 1969
| Ship | State | Description |
|---|---|---|
| BC Clipper | Canada | The halibut fishing vessel suffered an explosion, burned, and sank off Twoheaded Island (56°54′N 153°35′W) off the coast of Kodiak Island, Alaska, after a liquefied gas line from the galley freezer broke and the galley stove ignited the leaking gas. Three people were killed; the fishing vessel Peggy Jo (flag unknown) rescued the five survivors from an overturned life raft. |

=== 2 August ===
List of shipwrecks: 2 August 1969
| Ship | State | Description |
|---|---|---|
| Bethlehem | Liberia | The cargo ship collided with the tanker Showa Maru (Japan) 30 nautical miles (56 km) off Singapore (1°16′N 104°08′E). Bethlehem broke in three and sank with the loss of five crew. She was on a voyage from Tokyo, Japan to Aden, South Yemen. |

=== 8 August ===
List of shipwrecks: 8 August 1969
| Ship | State | Description |
|---|---|---|
| Thlinket | United States | The motor vessel sank in Sumner Strait in the Alexander Archipelago in Southeastern Alaska. |

=== 9 August ===
List of shipwrecks: 9 August 1969
| Ship | State | Description |
|---|---|---|
| Unnamed trawler | Japan | A fishing trawler sank in a collision with a Soviet patrol boat off Hokkaido, Japan. Eleven of her crew were killed. |

=== 15 August ===
List of shipwrecks: 15 August 1969
| Ship | State | Description |
|---|---|---|
| Bucyrus Victory | United States | The Victory ship was severely damaged by fire at San Pedro, California. She was consequently scrapped. |

=== 17 August ===
List of shipwrecks: 17 August 1969
| Ship | State | Description |
|---|---|---|
| Argos | United States | The tug struck a submerged object and sank northwest of Found Island (56°06′15″N 132°04′30″W) off the southwest tip of Wrangell Island in Southeast Alaska. |

=== 18 August ===
List of shipwrecks: 18 August 1969
| Ship | State | Description |
|---|---|---|
| Alamo Victory | United States | Hulda and Alamo Victory Hurricane Camille: The Victory ship collided with the steamship Hulda (Liberia) and the Victory ship Silver Hawk (United States) and was driven ashore at Gulfport, Mississippi. Consequently withdrawn from service and laid up. |
| Hulda | Liberia | Hurricane Camille: The cargo liner was driven ashore at Gulfport. Declared a constructive total loss and scrapped in situ. |
| Marine Collier | United States | The Victory ship broke her moorings at Mobile, Alabama and was damaged. She departed under tow on 21 September for scrapping at Santander, Spain. |
| Silver Hawk | United States | Silver Hawk and Hulda. Hurricane Camille: The Victory ship was driven into by Hulda (Liberia) and the Victory ship Alamo Victory (United States and was then driven ashore at Gulfport. Severely damaged and declared a constructive total loss. She was scrapped in situ in April 1970. |

=== 21 August ===
List of shipwrecks: 21 August 1969
| Ship | State | Description |
|---|---|---|
| Heroic | United States | The fishing trawler, a former Accentor-class coastal minesweeper, caught fire and sank in the Atlantic Ocean 15 miles (24 km) southeast of Gloucester, Massachusetts in 100 feet (30 m) of water in the Stellwagen Bank National Marine Sanctuary (42°24′N 70°27′W). The captain and four crew members were picked up by the fishing vessel Tiko I (West Germany). |

=== 22 August ===
List of shipwrecks: 22 August 1969
| Ship | State | Description |
|---|---|---|
| Sharon Patricia | United States | The motor vessel capsized and was lost in Shelikof Strait on the south-central coast of Alaska with the loss of one life. |

=== 25 August ===
List of shipwrecks: 25 August 1969
| Ship | State | Description |
|---|---|---|
| Noongah | Australia | The cargo ship foundered on 286 miles (249 nmi; 460 km) north of Sydney with the loss of 21 of her 26 crew. She was on a voyage from Newcastle, New South Wales to Townsville, Queensland. |

=== 26 August ===
List of shipwrecks: 26 August 1969
| Ship | State | Description |
|---|---|---|
| Dear John | United States | The motor vessel was destroyed by fire in Chatham Strait in Southeast Alaska 1.5 nautical miles (2.8 km; 1.7 mi) north of Funter Bay. |
| Skilak | United States | The motor vessel sank in Cook Inlet on the south-central coast of Alaska between Chinitna Point and Anchor Point. |

=== 29 August ===
List of shipwrecks: 29 August 1969
| Ship | State | Description |
|---|---|---|
| Munroe | United States | The 30-gross register ton, 46.9-foot (14.3 m) motor vessel sank after striking an iceberg in Stephens Passage in the Alexander Archipelago in Southeast Alaska. |

== September ==
=== 1 September ===
List of shipwrecks: 1 September 1969
| Ship | State | Description |
|---|---|---|
| Fani | Greece | The cargo ship caught fire at Piraeus. She was beached on Salamis Island. Refloated later that month and consequently scrapped. |
| Paralos | Panama | The cargo ship collided with Priamos (Greece) at Columbo, Ceylon. Paralos was on a voyage from Calcutta to Mormugao, India. She was consequently scrapped. |

=== 3 September ===
List of shipwrecks: 25 August 1969
| Ship | State | Description |
|---|---|---|
| Noordborg | Netherlands | The ship hit a petrol station in Franeker off the shore. It had just passed a bridge and turned its stern to take a bend in the Van Harinxmakanaal. No one was hurt. The damage amounted to thousands of guilders. |

=== 6 September ===
List of shipwrecks: 6 September 1969
| Ship | State | Description |
|---|---|---|
| Two unidentified motor torpedo boats | United Arab Republic Navy | War of Attrition: Operation Escort: Two No. 260-class motor torpedo boats were sunk with limpet mines by Israeli frogmen at Ras Sadat in the Bay of Suez. |
| Unknown | Israeli Navy | War of Attrition: Operation Escort: The Hazir submersible exploded from accidental causes returning from the operation, killing three frogmen and wounding one. |

=== 16 September ===
List of shipwrecks: 16 September 1969
| Ship | State | Description |
|---|---|---|
| USS Trepang | United States Navy | The decommissioned Balao-class auxiliary submarine was sunk as a gunnery target by the destroyers USS Fechteler and USS Henderson (both United States Navy). |

=== 22 September ===
List of shipwrecks: 22 September 1969
| Ship | State | Description |
|---|---|---|
| Agromayor | Spain | The cargo ship was driven onto rocks 18 nautical miles (33 km) north west of Gothenburg, Sweden and later sank at 57°53.630′N 11°26.970′E. One of the twenty people on board was killed. |
| USS Sandpumper | United States Navy | The dredger sank at Đồng Tâm, Vietnam after dredging up a piece of unexploded ordnance, which exploded on board. Salvage operations involving USS Crilly and USS Crandall (both United States Navy) abandoned on 30 December. |

=== 23 September ===
List of shipwrecks: 23 September 1969
| Ship | State | Description |
|---|---|---|
| Angel Gabriel | Greece | The tanker ran aground near Marsaskala, Malta in a storm. One person was killed of the 50 on board. |
| Cherry Victory | Taiwan | The Victory ship ran aground north of Sumatra, Indonesia (5°17′N 97°28′E). She was on a voyage from Mormugao, India to Keelung. She was refloated on 12 October and taken in to Penang, Malaysia. She was declared uneconomic to repair and was consequently scrapped. |

=== 26 September ===
List of shipwrecks: 26 September 1969
| Ship | State | Description |
|---|---|---|
| Sagitarius | Liberia | The Liberty ship collided with Schwarzburg (East Germany) and sank off Buenos Aires, Argentina. Sagitarius was on a voyage from Rosario, Argentina to Ravenna, Italy. Refloated on 1 October and towed in to Buenos Aires. Consequently scrapped at Campana, Argentin in December 1969. |

=== 29 September ===
List of shipwrecks: 29 September 1969
| Ship | State | Description |
|---|---|---|
| Pinnace 1386 | Royal Air Force | The Royal Air Force's Marine Branch craft Pinnace 1386, overturned while trying to enter the harbour at Amble, Northumberland, England. Three of her crew perished, while the other five were rescued, one after being stuck in the upturned hull for several hours. |

=== Unknown date ===
List of shipwrecks: Unknown date in September 1969
| Ship | State | Description |
|---|---|---|
| Poseidone | Panama | The cargo ship ran aground. She was on a voyage from Rouen, Seine-Maritime, France to Egypt. She was refloated and put in to Naples, Italy, where she was declared a constructive total loss. |

== October ==
=== 1 October ===
List of shipwrecks: 1 October 1969
| Ship | State | Description |
|---|---|---|
| Helen N | United States | The motor vessel was destroyed by fire at Allen Marine Ways in Jamestown Bay (57°02′40″N 135°17′30″W) in Sitka, Alaska. |

=== 2 October ===
List of shipwrecks: 2 October 1969
| Ship | State | Description |
|---|---|---|
| USNS Private Leonard C. Brostrom | United States Navy | The heavy lift cargo ship ran aground off Vung Tau, South Vietnam. She was refloated that day by the salvage lift craft USS YLLC-3 (United States Navy) and five tugs. |

=== 4 October ===
List of shipwrecks: 4 October 1969
| Ship | State | Description |
|---|---|---|
| Splendid Sky | Panama | The Liberty ship ran aground in the Scheldt. She was declared a constructive total loss and scrapped. |

=== 7 October ===
List of shipwrecks: 7 October 1969
| Ship | State | Description |
|---|---|---|
| HQ-6529 | Republic of Vietnam Navy | Vietnam War: The monitor struck a mine and sank south of Kien An, Vietnam. Salvaged by the United States Navy on 11 October and towed to Dong Tam for repairs. |

=== 8 October ===
List of shipwrecks: 8 October 1969
| Ship | State | Description |
|---|---|---|
| USS Barton | United States Navy | The decommissioned Allen M. Sumner-class destroyer was sunk as a target in the Atlantic Ocean off the coast of Virginia. |
| Tobruk | Greece | The cargo ship struck a mine and sank in the Mediterranean Sea in 35.06N/36.36E on a voyage from Syria to Libya. |

=== 10 October ===
List of shipwrecks: 10 October 1969
| Ship | State | Description |
|---|---|---|
| USS Frank E. Evans | United States Navy | Stern section sunk as a target in the South China Sea off U.S. Naval Base Subic Bay, Zambales, Philippines. |
| Lake Placid | Liberia | The T2 tanker suffered an engine explosion at Antwerp, Belgium and was severely damaged. Although declared a constructive total loss, she was sold to Swedish buyers and towed to Rotterdam, South Holland, Netherlands. She was repaired and returned to service as Garanda. |

=== 14 October ===
List of shipwrecks: 14 October 1969
| Ship | State | Description |
|---|---|---|
| USS Madison | United States Navy | The decommissioned Benson-class destroyer was sunk as a target in the Atlantic Ocean off southeastern Florida. |

=== 28 October ===
List of shipwrecks: 28 October 1969
| Ship | State | Description |
|---|---|---|
| USS Vincennes | United States Navy | The decommissioned Cleveland-class light cruiser was sunk as a target in the Pacific Ocean off Point Mugu, California, during missile experiments. |

=== 31 October ===
List of shipwrecks: 31 October 1969
| Ship | State | Description |
|---|---|---|
| Larry | United States | The tug sank in a storm near Cape Menshikof (57°31′20″N 157°49′15″W) on the Bristol Bay coast of the Alaska Peninsula. A bush pilot rescued her crew of four. |

=== Unknown date ===
List of shipwrecks: Unknown date October 1969
| Ship | State | Description |
|---|---|---|
| Cardinal O'Connell | United States | The Liberty ship was scuttled 93 nautical miles (172 km) off Cape Flattery, Washington. |
| HQ-1237 | Republic of Vietnam Navy | The armored troop carrier sank at Thoi Benh, South Vietnam. Salvaged by USS Satyr (United States Navy) and towed to Dong Tam, South Vietnam, on 6 November. |
| USCGC Matagorda | United States Coast Guard | The decommissioned Casco-class cutter was sunk as a target by the United States Navy in the Pacific Ocean 72 nautical miles (133 km) off Hawaii in position 20°08′00″N 158°30′00″W. |
| Norwich Victory | United States | The Victory ship ran aground at Da Nang, Vietnam and was severely damaged. She was refloated and towed to Yokosuka, Japan. Consequently scrapped in January 1970. |
| Ogoya | Nigerian Navy | Nigerian Civil War: The PC-461-class patrol vessel was wrecked off Brass, Nigeria. |
| PBR-7547 | Republic of Vietnam Navy | The river patrol boat was sunk near Tang Am, South Vietnam. She was salvaged on 29 October by USS CSB-3 (United States Navy) and taken to Tang Am. |

== November ==
=== 1 November ===
List of shipwrecks: 3 December 1996
| Ship | State | Description |
|---|---|---|
| Cabna | United States | The motor vessel was destroyed by fire at Nenana, Alaska. |

=== 4 November ===
List of shipwrecks: 4 November 1969
| Ship | State | Description |
|---|---|---|
| USS Bailey | United States Navy | The decommissioned Benson-class destroyer was sunk as a target off Florida. |

=== 5 November ===
List of shipwrecks: 5 November 1969
| Ship | State | Description |
|---|---|---|
| Cherokee | United States | The motor vessel was wrecked in Golovnin Bay on the west coast of Alaska. |

=== 6 November ===
List of shipwrecks: 6 November 1969
| Ship | State | Description |
|---|---|---|
| Reliance Harmony | Panama | The Liberty ship collided with Maritime Express (China) and sank in the Pacific Ocean off the coast of Japan (32°18′N 131°45′E). |

=== 7 November ===
List of shipwrecks: 7 November 1969
| Ship | State | Description |
|---|---|---|
| USS Bream | United States Navy | The decommissioned Gato-class submarine was sunk as a target off California by the submarine USS Sculpin (United States Navy). |

=== 8 November ===
List of shipwrecks: 8 November 1969
| Ship | State | Description |
|---|---|---|
| Tobruk | Greece | The refrigerated cargo ship struck a mine and sank in the Mediterranean Sea. |

=== 11 November ===
List of shipwrecks: 11 November 1969
| Ship | State | Description |
|---|---|---|
| Jeannie Lee | United States | The motor vessel was destroyed by fire in Pirates Cove (56°59′15″N 135°22′00″W) in Sitka Sound in Southeast Alaska. |

=== 19 November ===
List of shipwrecks: 19 November 1969
| Ship | State | Description |
|---|---|---|
| USS Burrfish | United States Navy | The decommissioned Balao-class submarine was sunk as a target in the Pacific Ocean off San Clemente Island, California. |

=== 22 November ===
List of shipwrecks: 22 November 1969
| Ship | State | Description |
|---|---|---|
| New Jersey | United States Navy | The dredger sank after an explosion while dredging at Dong Tam, South Vietnam. Refloated in December and towed to Singapore for repairs. |

=== 27 November ===
List of shipwrecks: 27 November 1969
| Ship | State | Description |
|---|---|---|
| Hullman | United Kingdom | The tug capsized and sank off Grimsby whilst towing Conoco Arrow (Liberia), killing three of her ten crew. |

=== Unknown date ===
List of shipwrecks: Unknown date 1969
| Ship | State | Description |
|---|---|---|
| HQ-5135 | Republic of Vietnam Navy | The assault support patrol boat was sunk at Dong Hung, South Vietnam. She was salvaged between 9 and 16 November in a joint Republic of Vietnam Navy and United States Navy operation and towed to Dong Tam, South Vietnam, for repairs. |
| HQ-1234 | Republic of Vietnam Navy | The armored troop carrier was sunk at Dong Hung, South Vietnam. She was salvaged between 9 and 16 November in a joint Republic of Vietnam Navy and United States Navy operation and towed to Dong Tam, Vietnam, South Vietnam, for repairs. |

== December ==
=== 5 December ===
List of shipwrecks: 5 December 1969
| Ship | State | Description |
|---|---|---|
| Teejin | United States | The crab-fishing vessel was wrecked at Cape Lazaref (54°37′00″N 163°35′10″W) on Unimak Island in the Aleutian Islands. |

=== 14 December ===
List of shipwrecks: 14 December 1969
| Ship | State | Description |
|---|---|---|
| Metric | West Germany | The coaster sank off Pembrokeshire after her cargo shifted in stormy weather. All crew rescued by Vega (Finland) and landed at Fishguard. |

=== 15 December ===
List of shipwrecks: 15 December 1969
| Ship | State | Description |
|---|---|---|
| Marpessa | United Kingdom | The tanker sank 50 nautical miles (93 km) north west of Dakar, Senegal after an explosion and fire on 12 December. |

=== 16 December ===
List of shipwrecks: 16 December 1969
| Ship | State | Description |
|---|---|---|
| Romulus | Panama | The cargo ship foundered in the mouth of the Adour, Pyrénées-Atlantiques, France. Six of her 25 crew were killed. |

=== 19 December ===
List of shipwrecks: 19 December 1969
| Ship | State | Description |
|---|---|---|
| USS Iredell County | United States Navy | The landing ship tank ran aground in the Cochien River, Vietnam. Salvage operation involving USS Chowanoc, USS Current and USS Reclaimer (United States Navy) resulted in the ship being refloated on 25 December. |

=== 25 December ===
List of shipwrecks: 25 December 1969
| Ship | State | Description |
|---|---|---|
| Eastern 1 | United States | The barge, a converted Liberty ship, broke from her tow and came ashore near the mouth of the Shark River and broke in two. |
| Eastern 2 | United States | The barge, a converted Liberty ship, broke from her tow and came ashore near the mouth of the Shark River, 12 nautical miles (22 km) from Sandy Hook, New Jersey and broke in two. |
| Rosa Vlassi | Greece | The cargo ship capsized and sank in the Mediterranean Sea (37°37′N 24°02′E).ref name=Ships> |

=== 26 December ===
List of shipwrecks: 26 December 1969
| Ship | State | Description |
|---|---|---|
| Oregis | United Kingdom | The bulk carrier ran around at Workington, Cumberland. Refloated on 26 December. |

=== 28 December ===
List of shipwrecks: 28 December 1969
| Ship | State | Description |
|---|---|---|
| Horis | Panama | The Empire Malta-class cargo ship sprang a leak in the Celebes Sea. She was on a voyage from Surabaya, Indonesia to Hong Kong. She capsized and sank the next day 200 nautical miles (370 km) off Tawau, Sabah, Malaysia (3°53′N 119°23′E). |

=== 29 December ===
List of shipwrecks: 29 December 1969
| Ship | State | Description |
|---|---|---|
| Mactra | United Kingdom | The tanker suffered an explosion of her tanks whilst cleaning her tanks off the coast of Mozambique. One of her crew was injured. |

=== 30 December ===
List of shipwrecks: 30 December 1969
| Ship | State | Description |
|---|---|---|
| Dean Reinauer | United States | The T1 tanker suffered an engine room explosion and caught fire at Portland, Maine. She was consequently converted to a barge. |
| Heinrich Hauschildt | West Germany | The coaster capsized and sank 20 nautical miles (37 km) north of Kiel. |

== Unknown date ==
List of shipwrecks: Unknown date 1969
| Ship | State | Description |
|---|---|---|
| Bandim | PAIGC | Guinea-Bissau War of Independence: The motorboat was damaged by Portuguese rockets and machine gun fire from two inflatables and beached sometime in 1969. The beached vessel was burned by the Portuguese. |
| Ben Olliver | United Kingdom | The dredger was struck by lightning and sank off Bedhampton, Hampshire. She was refloated and taken in tow, but sank off Langstone, Hampshire. |
| Hemsley 1 | United Kingdom | The tanker was wrecked at Winecove Point, Cornwall. |
| USS Heyliger | United States Navy | The decommissioned John C. Butler-class destroyer escort was sunk as a target in the Atlantic Ocean by the United States Atlantic Fleet. |
| Lalor | Australia | The tug was scuttled off Townsville, Queensland. |
| Matrouh | United Arab Republic Navy | The corvette sank in 1968 or 1969. |
| USS Pandemus | United States Navy | The decommissioned Achelous-class landing craft repair ship was sunk as a target in late 1969. |
| Taif | Egypt | War of Attrition: The passenger-cargo ship, blocked in the Suez Canal, Egypt, was shelled by Israeli Army artillery, set on fire, and then sank and was abandoned. |
| Talodi | Egypt | War of Attrition: The passenger/cargo ship, blocked in the Suez Canal, Egypt, was shelled by Israeli Army artillery, set on fire, and then sank and was abandoned. |
