= Vori =

Vori may refer to:

- Igor Vori (born 1980), Croatian handball player
- MV Vori, a Panamanian and Greek cargo ship in service from 1952–1967
- Vori, a frazione of Sagron Mis
