= SS Bibury =

A number of steamships were named Bibury, including:

- SS Bibury (1929), a British cargo ship in service 1929–1940
- SS Bibury (1941), a British cargo ship in service 1946–1951
