= SS Jaguar =

SS Jaguar or SS Jaguar could refer to:

- SS Jaguar, early Jaguar cars were known as SS Jaguars, SS Cars Ltd built them
- SS Jaguar (1941), a Panamanian steamship
