= Kiesterzijl =

Kiesterzijl Kiestersyl (West Frisian)
- Hamlet
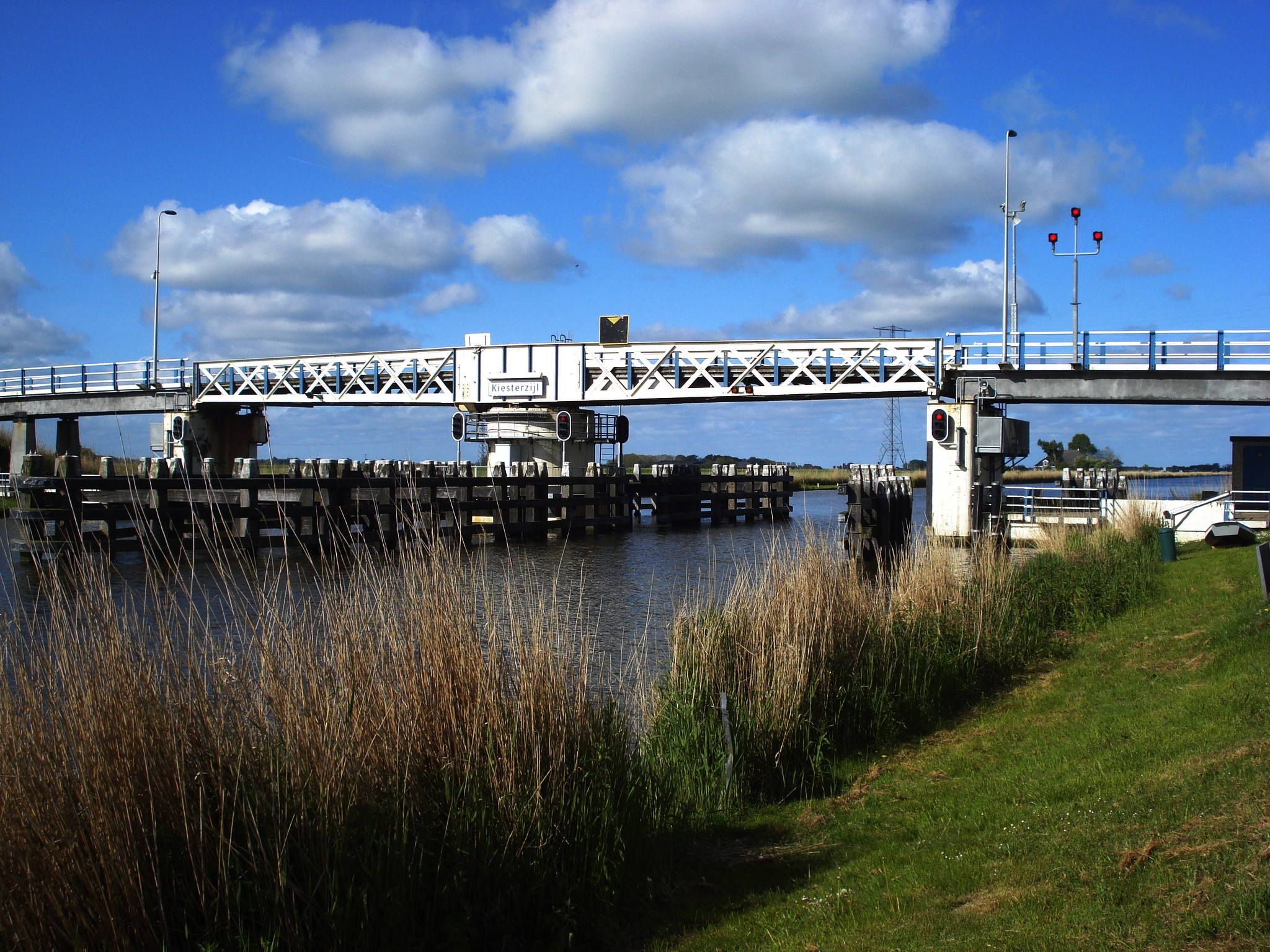
- Kiesterzijl bridge

- Location in the province of Friesland in the Netherlands Kiesterzijl (Netherlands)
- Coordinates: 53.18135°N 5.50529°E
- Country: Netherlands
- Province: Friesland
- Municipality: Waadhoeke
- City: Franeker
- Elevation: 0.6 m (2.0 ft)

Population
  - Total: c. 35
- Time zone: UTC+1 (CET)
  - Summer (DST): UTC+2 (CEST)
- Postcode: 8801
- Area code: 0517

Kiesterzijl (Dutch: [ˌkistərˈzɛil]; West Frisian: Kiestersyl) is a hamlet in the Dutch municipality of Waadhoeke in the province of Friesland. The hamlet is located southeast of Herbaijum and west of Franeker, adjacent to an industrial estate in Franeker. Kiesterzijl has a number of houses, a swing bridge over the Van Harinxma Canal, a shipping company and a power plant for transmission towers. Administratively, Kiesterzijl is a part of Franeker.

== Lock ==
The Kiesterzijl was named after the nearby hamlet of Kie and was the largest and most important lock (Dutch: zijl) in the Slachtedijk. The lock gates were usually open and were only closed in times of emergency, such as during a heavy storm when there was a risk that the seawall could collapse and the Slachtedijk had to hold back the water as a sleeper dike. Hence the names keersluis ('control lock') or waarborgsluis ('guarantee lock') for this lock. The dike then closed off the water from the Harlinger Zijlroede, called Harlingertrekvaart from 1645 and Van Harinxma Canal from 1939.

It is assumed that the Kiesterzijl was constructed at the same time as the creation of the old Franeker-Achlum polder, somewhere between 1000 and 1200. The name only appears for the first time in 1511 as Keesterzyl and in 1543 as Kiesterzyll, Kisterdazyl and Kyesterzyll. in 1664 it became Kiesterzyl and from the 19th century Kiesterzijl. It was originally a wooden lock, which was replaced by a stone one in 1698. In 1837 the lock was renewed again and three stream holes were added instead of one. There were two lock doors in each opening and a swing bridge was located above the middle flow hole.

As part of the improvement of the Fonejacht-Harlingen waterway, the Kiesterzijl was located a little further south in the Van Harinxma Canal. The lock now had two passages that were no longer closed with doors, but with a series of long pipes that were lowered into rabbets. The swing bridge on the center pier was equipped with grabs and the bridge functioned as a 'crane' that lifted the pipes from the embankment, raised them above the trenches and then lowered them. With this system it was not possible to close the passages in time during stormy weather. That is why in 1956 a complete hoisting system was installed on the north and south sides of the bridge, which made it possible to close the passages with the pipes within two hours. This installation was removed in 1996 because the importance of the Kiesterzijl as an emergency barrier was of little use anymore.

== Hamlet ==
The hamlet of Kiesterzijl only developed when a brickworks was built in 1857. At that time there were four houses near the lock. One of them was the bridge tender's house, in the other houses small-scale horticulturists lived. Five houses were immediately built for the staff of the brickworks, including that of the foreman (tasker). The expansion continued with a concrete factory in 1904 and two lime kilns around 1917. The brickworks was demolished in 1920.

Homes and commercial buildings were originally located on both banks of the canal. When the canal was improved in 1942, the bend at Kiesterzijl was cut off and the hamlet was located completely north of the Van Harinxma Canal.

Nowadays the hamlet is part of the West Kiesterzijl industrial estate. In 2017 it consisted of approximately fifteen residential houses and some commercial buildings. The number of inhabitants was estimated at 35. There is no place name sign anymore, only the street name is a reminder of the hamlet and the lock.
