= Van Harinxmakanaal =

Canal in Netherlands

van Harinxmakanaal
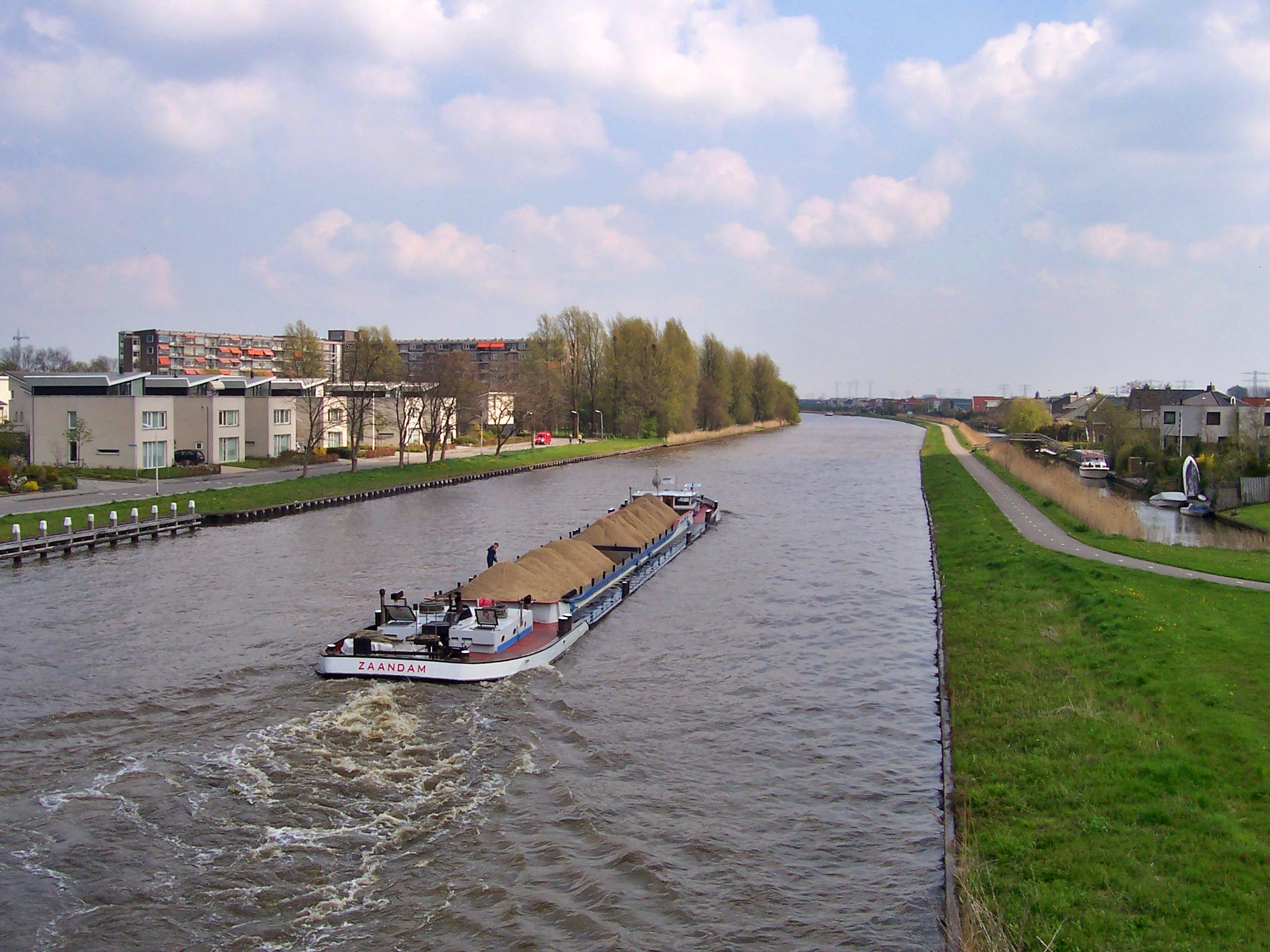
- The barge Bijlmermeer on the canal
- Interactive map of van Harinxmakanaal
- Country: Netherlands

Specifications
- Length: 37.5 km (23.3 miles)

Geography
- Direction: East
- Start point: North Sea
- End point: near Leeuwarden
- Beginning coordinates: 53.178°N 5.414°E
- Ending coordinates: 53.170°N 5.931°E

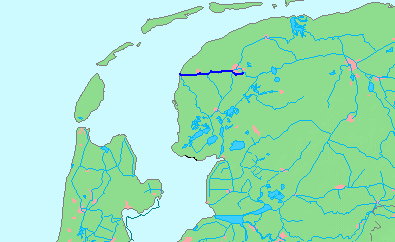
Location map of the van Harinxmakanaal in the Netherlands

The van Harinxmakanaal is a major canal in western Frisland. It runs from the sea at Harlingen eastwards to Leeuwarden. Major places along the canal include Franeker, Dronrijp and Deinum. The canal is 37.5 kilometers long. It was named after Pieter Albert Vincent van Harinxma thoe Slooten in 1950 who was King's Commissioner to Friesland from 1909 to 1945. Prior to this date it was called Harlinger Trekvaart. However this was widened and deepened, and a few corners cut off in 1951. At Suawoude it joins the Prinses Margriet Canal.

The lock Tsjerk Hiddessluizen situated at the connection to the Harlingen harbour maintains the water level in the canal. The canal water level is connected to the water system called Friese boezem, consisting of lakes, waterways and canals in Friesland.

== Biology ==
The van Harinxmakanaal has allowed the Eurasian otter (Lutra lutra) to move freely to new habitats in lakes and rivers in Friesland since 2002. However the banks of the canal are unsuitable for otters as there is no vegetation.

== Capacity ==
The canal has been engineered to allow CEMT class IV vessels to transverse. These can have a draft of 3 m, a maximum length of 105 m, width 9.5 m and be up to 2000 tonnes. The height limit under bridges is 5.45 m.

Table of traffic traversing Tsjerk Hidessluizen
year	traffic	reference
2009	3328	
2011	3956	

== Crossing points ==
van Harinxmakanaal is crossed by a number of bridges or aqueducts. The following are derived from Google Maps.

No.	Name	Kind	Crossing	Image
B1	Tsjerk Hiddessluizen	Road bridge (2 Bascule bridges)	N 390; Harlingen - Almenum (Oude Ringmuur)	
B2	Koningsbrug	road bridge (Bascule bridge)	Midlum - Harlingen	
A1	Akwadukt Van Harinxmakanaal	aqueduct	N 31; Zurich - Drachten (Waadseewei)	
B3	Brug Kiesterzijl	road bridge (swing bridge)	Kiesterzijl - Kie	
B4	Frisiabrêge	road bridge (bascule bridge)	N 384; Tzummarum - Deersum (Burg. J. Dijkstraweg)	
B5	Stationsbrug	road bridge (double-beam drawbridge)	Franeker - Tzum (Stationsweg)	
B6	Brug Dronrijp	road bridge (bascule bridge)	Dronrijp - Winsum (It Heech)	
B7	Brug Ritsumazijl	road bridge (bascule bridge)	Ritsumazijl - Deinum (Hegedijk)	
A2	Richard Hageman Aquaduct	aqueduct	N 31; Zurich - Drachten	
A3	Margaretha Zelle Akwadukt	aqueduct	Leeuwarden - Deinum (Johannes Brandsmaweg)	
B8	Spoorbrug HRM	rail bridge (swing bridge)	Leeuwarden - Harlingen (Harlingen–Nieuweschans railway); Leeuwarden - Stavoren (Leeuwarden–Stavoren railway)	
B9	Spoorbrug HRMK	rail bridge (swing bridge)	Leeuwarden - Arnhem (Arnhem–Leeuwarden railway)	HUA-167247-Gezicht op de spoorbrug over het van Harinxmakanaal ten zuiden van Leeuwarden
B10	Van Harinxmabrug	road bridge (2 bascule bridges)	Leeuwarden - Goutum (Overijsselselaan)	Van Harinxmabrug, Leeuwarden
A4	M.C. Escher Akwadukt	aqueduct	Leeuwarden - Drachten (Drachtsterweg)	M.C. Escher Akwadukt

== Tributaries ==
A number of smaller canals and water courses connect with the varinxmakanaal. These are shallower and have lower bridge clearances but may be suitable for recreational vessels.

Canals and tributaries
Name	km	From	Direction	To	Reference
Noordergracht	36.9	Tsjerk Hiddesluizen	southeast		
Ried	36.4		North and South		
Verbindingkanal		Koningsbrug	Southwest	Franekertrekvaart, central Harlingen	
Harlingertrekvaart	35.35		East	Moorings	
Marconihaven	34.8	Harlingen east	north	Harbour	
Achlumer Feart	34.6	Harlingen east	South	Achlum	
Arumer Feart / Arumervaart	29.7	Franeker	Southwest	Arum, Achlum	
Franeker Watersport Vereniging	29.2		North		
Tsjomer Feart		Franeker	East-southeast	Tzum	
Krommer Gracht	28.6	Franeker	West	NW Franeker	
Noorder Gracht	28.3	Franeker	North	Doanjumer Feart	
Alde Trekfeart	27.3	Franeker	West	Noorder Gracht	
Frjentsjerter Feart / Franekervaart	25.5	Franeker	Southeast	Winsum, Easterlittens	
Hatsumer Opfeart			Southeast	Hatsum	
Harnzer Trekfeart (cutoff)	22.4	Dronrijp	Northeast		
		Dronrijp	West	Trailerhelling Dronryp	
Longebuorster Feart / Lange Buurstervaart		Southeast	non-navigable		
Puolfeart		De Poelen	North	non-navigable	
Molesleat			Southwest		
Boalserter Feart / Bolswarder Vaart	17.3		South	Bolsward	
Blessumer Feart	15.8		Southeast	Blessum	
Menamer Feart		Deinum	Northwest	Menaldum	
De Swette	11.8	Leeuwarden	South	Sneek	
		Middelsee Goutum	South		
		Himpenserdijkbrug	South	Goutum, de Klamp, Wiarda	
?Drachtsterweg		M.C. Escher Aquaduct	North		
Nauwe Greuns			South	Teerns, Hempens, Zuiderburen	
Wide Groens			North		
Woudmansdiep			North		
Wergeasterfeart		Hmpenser Wielen	South	Wergea	
Alde Lune	2.8		North	Louwsmeer	
Nijdijp	1.2	Lange Meer	North	Tytsjerk	

A pumping station was built next to the Richard Hageman Aquaduct in 2014. This pumps water from the adjacent polders after it comes through a wetland to remove sludge.

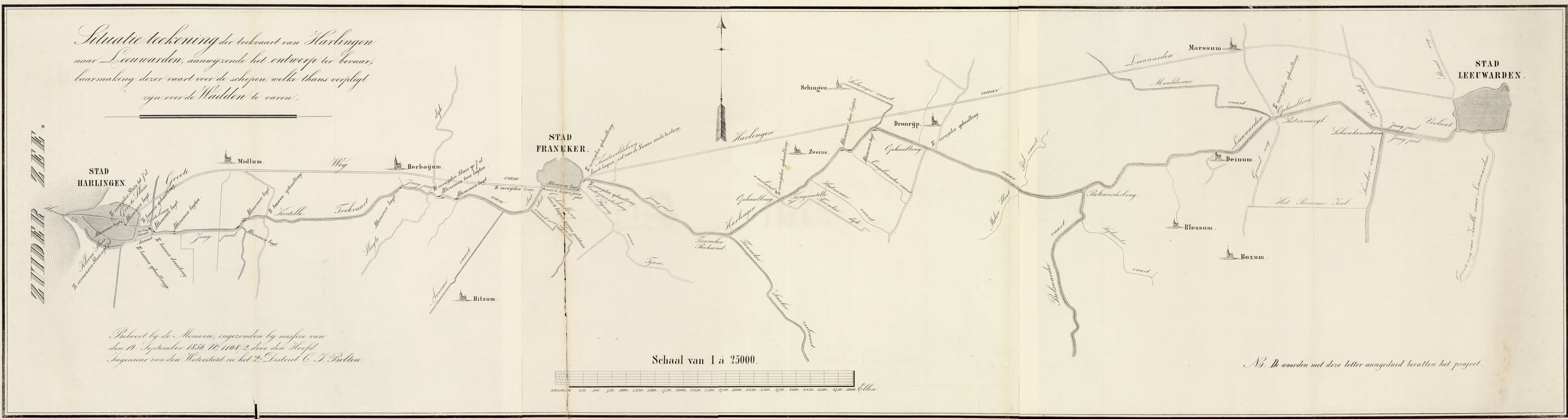
map of Harlinger Trekvaart from 1856 showing tributaries

== Incidents ==
A petrol station at Franeker was hit off the shore by MS Noordborg while trying to take a bend after passing a bridge on September 3, 1969. Nobody was hurt, but the damage was several thousand guilders.

The opening of Spoorbrug HRMK broke down on 7 September 2021, closing the canal to shipping at this point. A cylinder was replaced restoring function on 4 October 2021.

== See also ==
- Dronrijp Reprisals
