= Kie, Friesland =

Kie
- Hamlet
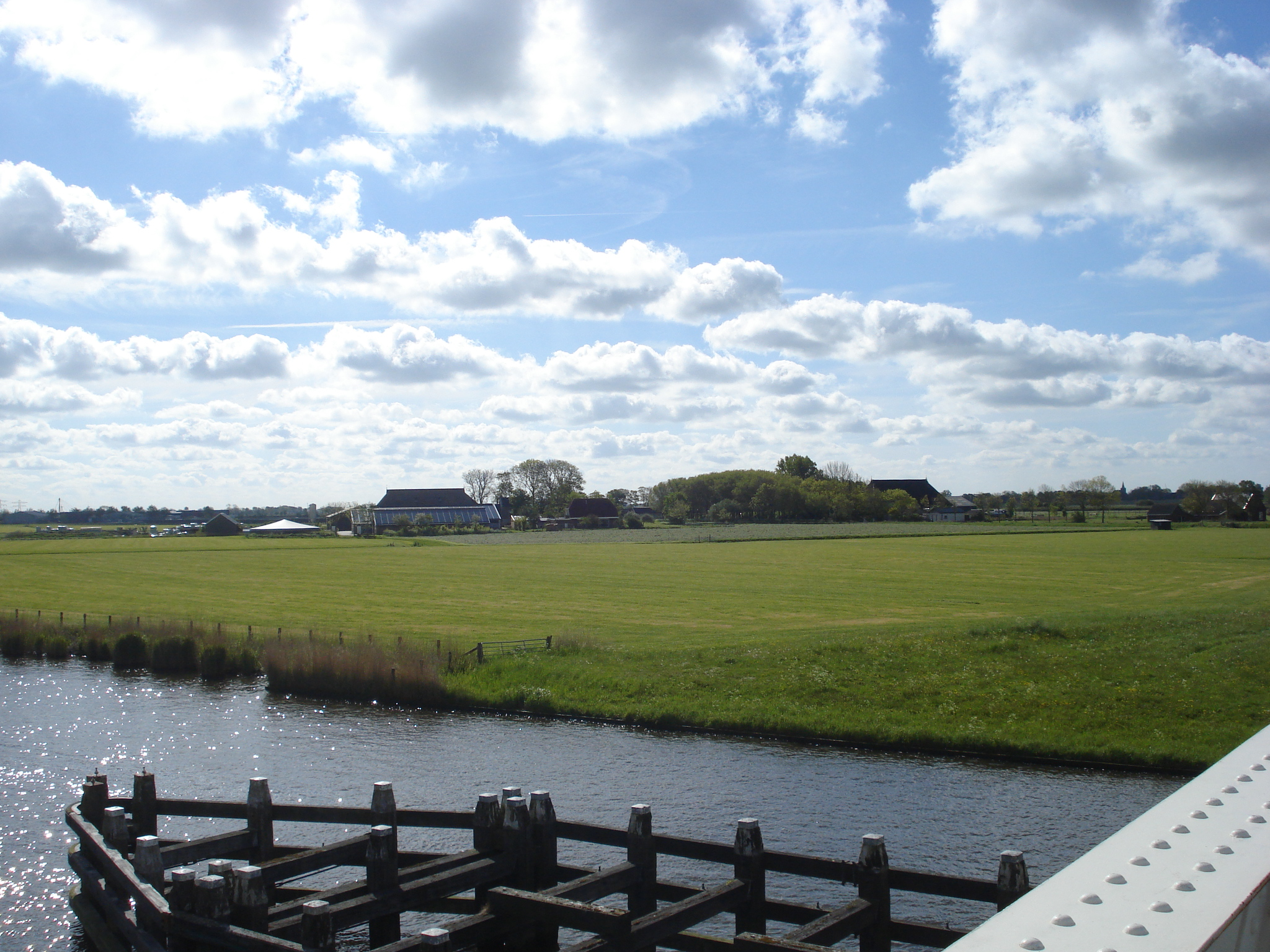
- View of Kie from the Kiesterzijlsterbrug

- Location in the province of Friesland in the Netherlands Kie (Netherlands)
- Coordinates: 53.17678°N 5.51016°E
- Country: Netherlands
- Province: Friesland
- Municipality: Waadhoeke
- City: Franeker
- Elevation: 0.5 m (1.6 ft)

Population
  - Total: c. 20
- Time zone: UTC+1 (CET)
  - Summer (DST): UTC+2 (CEST)
- Postcode: 8801
- Area code: 0517

Kie (Dutch pronunciation: [ki]) is a hamlet in the Dutch municipality of Waadhoeke in the province of Friesland. It is located northwest of Hitzum, southeast of Herbaijum and just southwest of Franeker, of which it is a part administratively. The settlement of the hamlet is located on a road of the same name. The Van Harinxma Canal, formerly called the Harlingertrekvaart, flows north of Kie.

The floodgate constructed near Kie took its name from the hamlet: Kiesterzijl.

== Etymology ==
In 1407 the place was mentioned as Kee (Grata kee and Liteka kee), in 1511 as Lutke kie, in 1543 as Kye, in 1572 as Kije and from the 17th century as Kie. The place name is said to be a contraction of the Old Frisian word kêthe or kîth, which means inheritance and family property. The inhabitants of Kie were often named Kesitt(e)ra or Keestra, which form occurs in the New Frisian surname Kiestra (next to Keestra).

== History ==
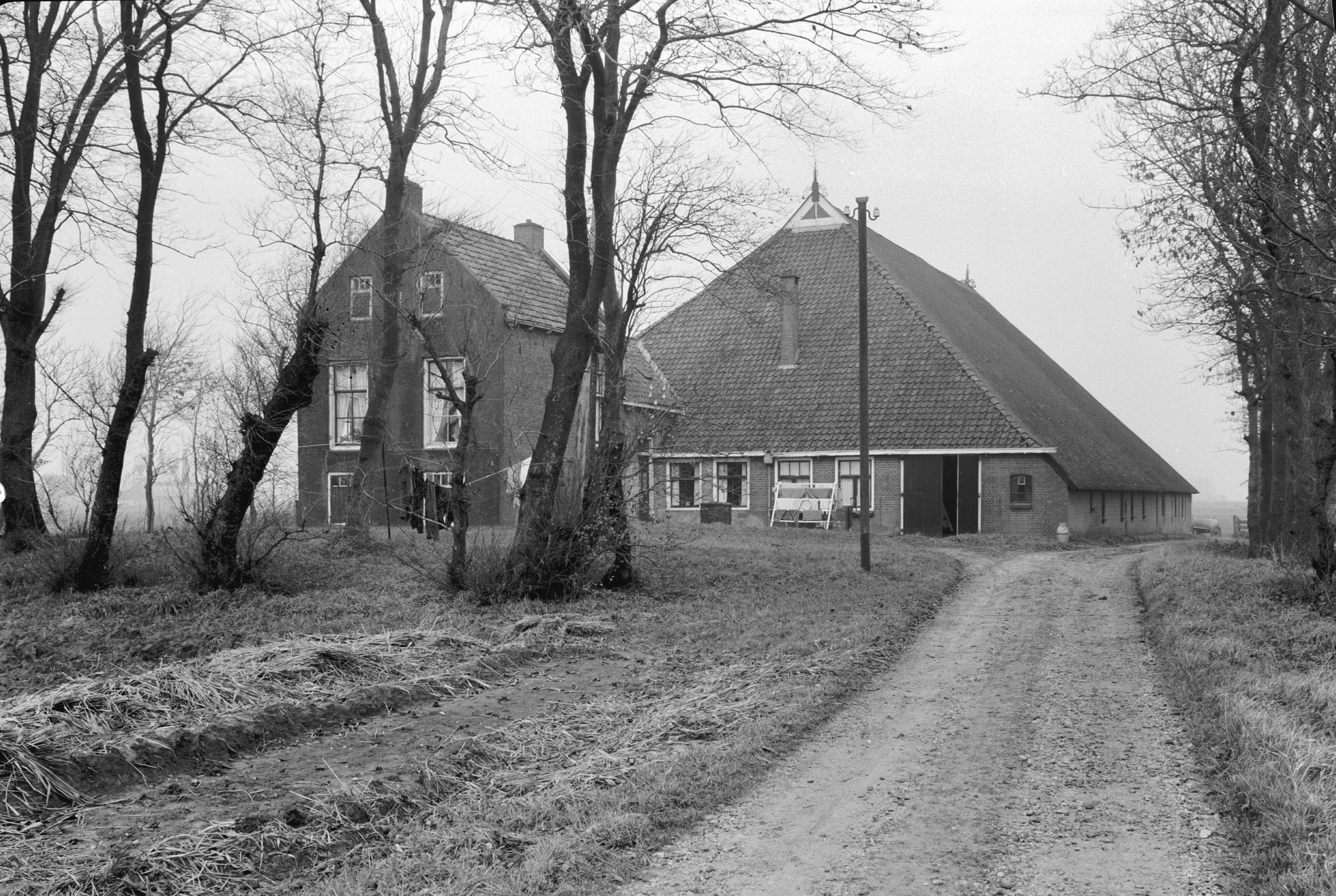
Typical Frisian farmhouse in Kie dating from 1750

Kie was originally part of Herbaijum and both belonged to the grietenij of Franekeradeel. The management of Franekeradeel was in the hands of a grietman, assisted by a number of fellow judges. They were elected for one year and the positions rotated according to a fixed system: the rechtsomgang. Owners of a farm and associated land were eligible to vote. For example, in 1407 a resident of Kie, Sibet van Kee, became the grietman of Franekeradeel and in 1410 he was a judge.

When the city of Franeker separated from Franekeradeel in 1474, thirteen settlements (including the hamlet of Kie) remained with Franekeradeel as Franeker Uitburen. In 1531 they joined the city and formed a separate district there until 1917. In 1514 Kie consisted of four farms. The oldest farm of the current buildings dates from 1700, which is mentioned in a gable stone.

In 1921, the traditional windmills in Kie were replaced by an American windmill, which in turn was replaced in 1961 by a motor pumping station, which served until 1973. There has been a signalman's house (wachtpost 8) on the track since 1869. During the German occupation of the Netherlands, the signalman's position was abolished here.

The Kie industrial estate was constructed on the east side of Kie in the 21st century. There is no place name sign, only the street name is a reminder of the hamlet.
