= Dronrijp Reprisals =

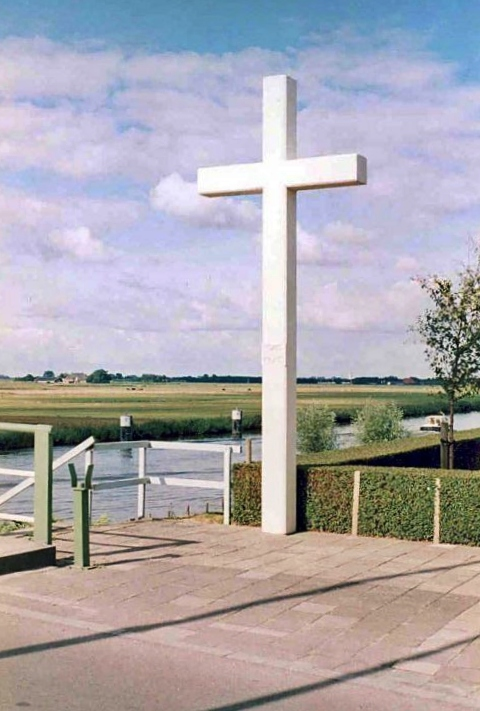
The memorial cross at the location of the execution

The Dronrijp Reprisals were carried out by the German Sicherheitsdienst in the Dutch town of Dronrijp on 11 April 1945. 14 prisoners, including 11 members of the Dutch resistance, were shot in reprisal for the sabotage of a rail line.

== Background ==
In the evening of 9 April 1945, only a few days before the town's liberation by the Canadians, the local department of the national resistance organisation Binnenlandse Strijdkrachten (BS) received the order to start "sabotaging road, rail and water" to prevent German troops from escaping to Germany. BS member Broer Dijkstra and his sabotage group decided to prepare a disruption of the Leeuwarden-Franeker train line. In the night of 9 to 10 April, they removed the screws of 75 metres of railroad track, causing a Wehrmacht locomotive carrying 26 wagons to derail the night after. Within hours, the Sicherheitsdienst and the Sicherheitspolizei learned about the sabotage by a message from the town hall in Menaldum, intercepted and noted by the resistance as follows:

"At 23.30, in the night of 10 to 11 April, a Wehrmacht train consisting of one locomotive and 26 wagons derailed near a railroad bridge across the Bolswardertrekvaart, South of Dronrijp. The train left Leeuwarden for Franeker. Over a distance of 75 metres, screws were removed and ties were taken from the track. The locomotive is off the rails with two wagons behind it, and two other wagons lay on their sides. The wagons that were not derailed have been taken back to Leeuwarden. No personal accidents. Large amount of material damage."

== Reprisals ==
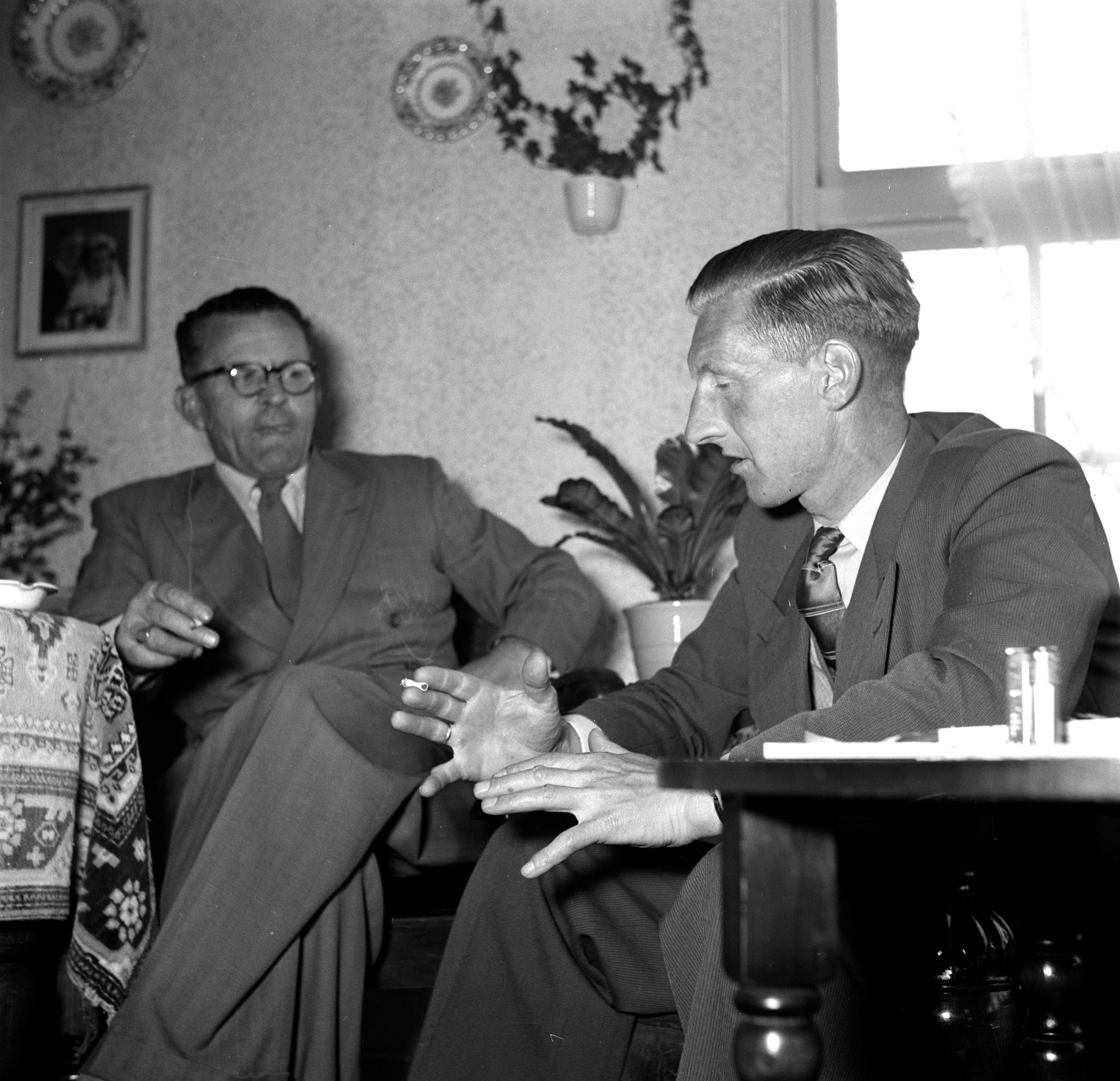
Gerard de Jong, right, the only survivor, with Ynse Postma, one of his rescuers, in 1955

The Sicherheitsdienst was furious and demanded the execution of 20 prisoners in Dronrijp the following day. A secret BS group in Leeuwarden intercepted the order and immediately positioned men near the sabotaged rail line, as they expected the prisoners to arrive by train. However, 14 prisoners from Leeuwarden were transported to Dronrijp in the back of a truck. As soon as they arrived, several British fighters overflew the town, causing the Sicherheitsdienst members to panic. Then they discovered that the bridge across the Van Harinxmakanaal was opened by the resistance, which blocked the road leading to the rail line. Now the only option was to guide the prisoners down next to the bridge to have them shot right there. One of the men, Gerard de Jong from Leeuwarden, survived the execution by pretending to be dead until the Germans had disappeared. People from the town, including Ynse Postma, rushed to the site and rescued him. De Jong's luck was helped by the specific instruction from the Sicherheitsdienst for its men not to remove the bodies from the scene.

== Memorial ==
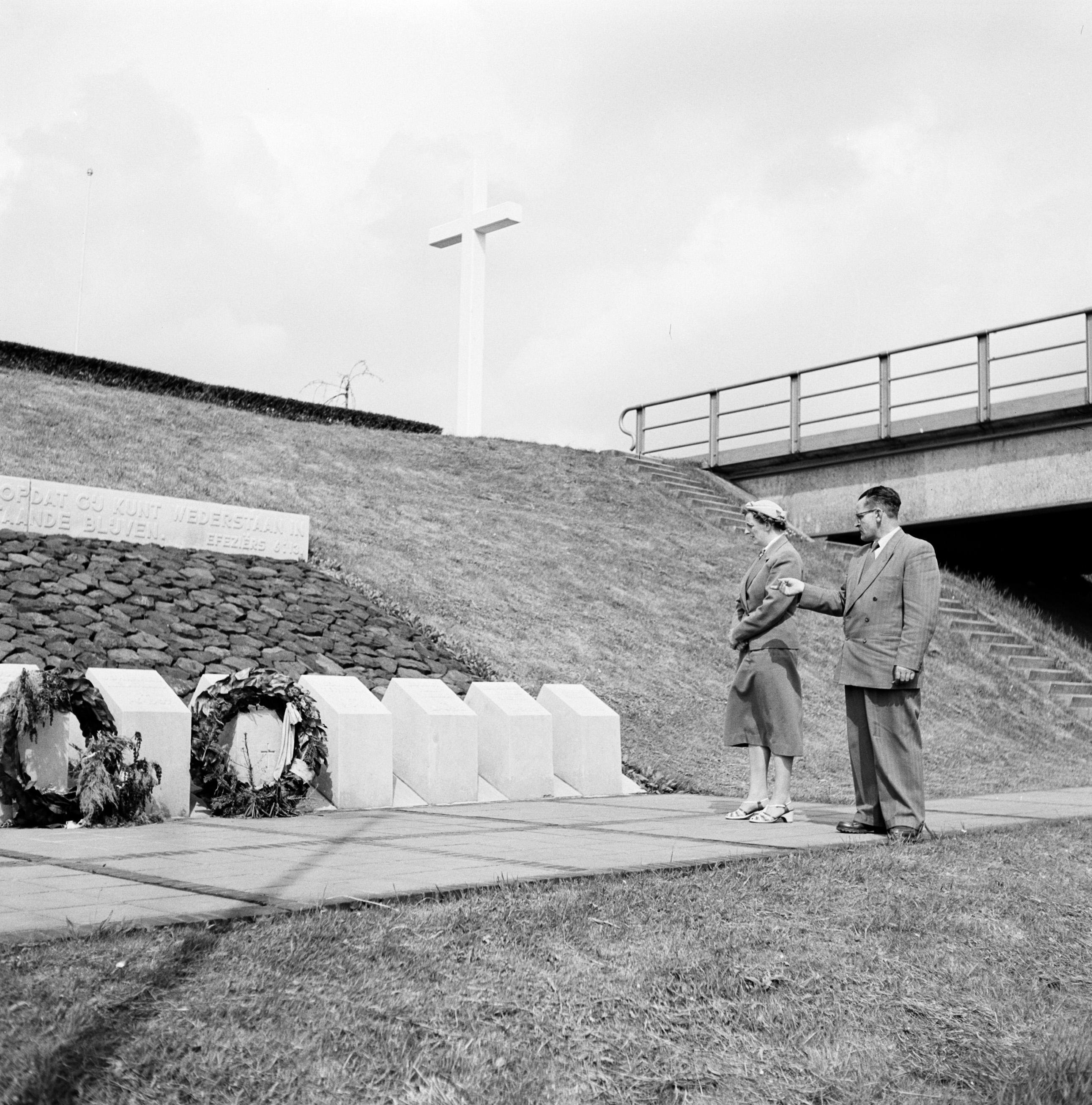
Ynse Postma, at the memorial in 1955

Of the 13 prisoners who died that day, 11 were members of the resistance. Their names which are listed below are honoured at a memorial of 11 stone blocks that was built in 1949 at the location of the execution. A commemoration service is held every year on 4 May, the National Day of the Remembrance of the Dead.

1. Johannes Nieuwland
2. Hendrik Spoelstra
3. Douwe Tuinstra
4. Mark Wierda
5. Klaas Wierda
6. Hyltje Wierda
7. Sybrandus van Dam
8. Heinrich Harder
9. Dirk de Jong
10. Hendrik de Jong
11. Ruurd Kooistra

The other two prisoners were Johannes Ducaneaux and Oudger van Dijk, whose activities during the war can be considered quite controversial. Ducaneaux was suspected of being a mole, and Van Dijk was a member of the Schutzstaffel (SS). Their names are therefore not honoured at the memorial.
