= MS Noordborg =

Dutch wood coaster

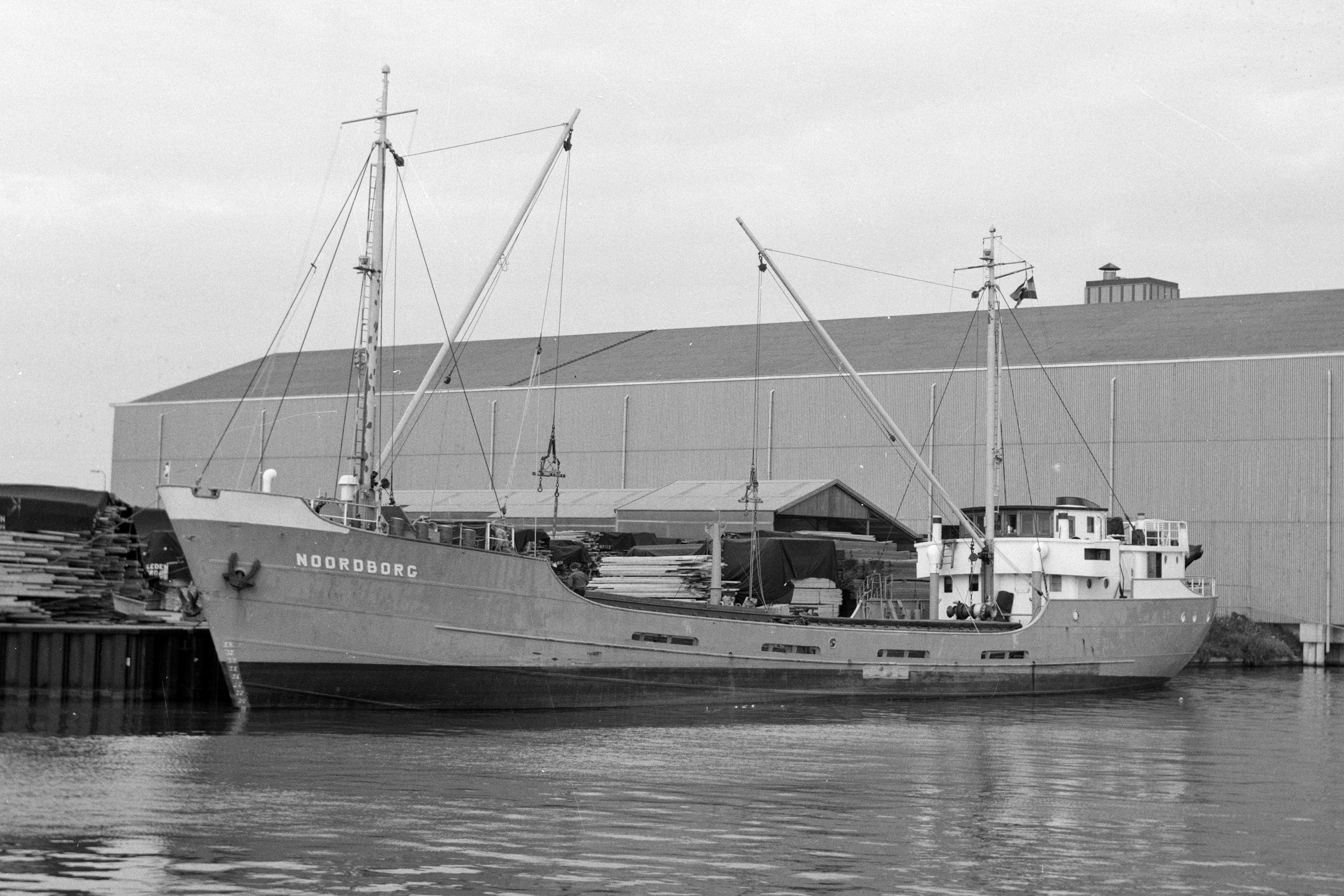
- MS Noordborg in the port of Utrecht, late 1960s

History
- Name: 1962–75: Noordborg; 1975-1978: Azolla; 1978–1992: Alk; 1992-2009: Casper; 2009: Noordborg
- Namesake: Noord
- Owner: Dick van der Kamp Shipsales B.V.
- Port of registry: Delfzijl, Netherlands
- Ordered: 1962
- Builder: N.V. Dok- en Scheepsbouw Mij. 'Makkum' (Makkum, Netherlands)
- Yard number: 1
- Laid down: 1962
- Launched: 2 March 1962
- Completed: 1 May 1962
- Maiden voyage: 3 May 1962
- In service: 1962-1991
- Identification: Call sign: PCML; IMO number: 5254498; MMSI number: 246139000
- Status: Retired

General characteristics
- Type: General Cargo ship
- Tonnage: 397 GRT
- Length: 49.55 m
- Beam: 7.95 m
- Draught: 2.979 m
- Depth: 3.23 m
- Decks: 1
- Installed power: 240 bhp
- Propulsion: 1 × 4-cylinder Brons 4ED (290×450) 4-stroke oil engine, single screw
- Speed: 8.5 knots

MS Noordborg is a retired single-screw Dutch wood coaster built for Wagenborg's Scheepvaart- & Expeditiebedrijf N.V.. The 48.5-metre (159 ft) long ship was built in 1962 at the Dok- en Scheepsbouw Maatschappij in Makkum, Netherlands.

== Description ==
The ship was built as yard number 1 at N.V. Dok- en Scheepsbouw Mij. 'Makkum'. Her propulsion consists of Brons-motor 10408 Type 4ED engines.

== History ==
Noordborg was built at and launched at the shipyard N.V. Dok- en Scheepsbouw Mij. 'Makkum' in 1962, as the first of four ships of her type for Wagenborg, registered in Delfzijl. Her sister ships were Hunzeborg and Delfborg, who were built at the same shipyard in Makkum, and Dintelborg, which was built in a shipyard in Lemmer. The shipyard she was built at was new, having only existed for two years prior to the order of Noordborg being placed. Noordborg and her sister ships were needed for the company to get back on trade, after World War II had sank most of their ships.

She was retired in 1991 from active commercial freight transport by Wagenborg, due to her running aground at Wells-next-the-Sea, alongside the shift toward containerization and larger vessels. After running aground, Noordborg did not sail under own power again, and she was sold for scrap. Subsequently, in the same year, Dick van der Kamp Shipsales B.V. bought the ship, to then be resold to a Dutch couple in November 1992, being given the name Casper. As Casper, she served as a houseboat in Zaandam. The intention was to restore the ship and preserve it, but due to various reasons, including bureaucracy, illness, and setbacks, little actually came of the restoration efforts. She remained in Zaandam until May of 2009, when she was bought back by Dick van der Kamp Shipsales.

Noordborg, as Alk/Casper, heavily rusted under tow.

In 2009, Casper was towed from Zaandam to 's-Gravendeel, to be restored to her original condition from 1962. She had heavily deteriorated since her sale as a houseboat in 1992, with her bow being heavily rusted as a result of lack of upkeep. Her restoration included gaining back the name Noordborg, and getting back her home port of Delfzijl like she did in 1962. Since 2015, she has been moored at Bolnes, waiting for a sale. In 2019, a conservation project was started, raising funds to turn the ship into a museum ship to house the Brons Motors museum, which closed in 2016. However, the sale of the ship failed multiple times, due to disputes about the price and the conservation project not having the money (or not being willing) to pay for the ship in full.

== In popular media ==
In 1970, Noordborg served as the ship used in the series Pipo Op Bizarra for the Dutch television show Pipo De Clown. For this, the caravan featured in the show was lifted onto the deck, with the ship leaving each morning from the Wagenborg Terminal in Delfzijl for recording sessions on the Eems.

== Incidents ==
On September 3, 1969, Noordborg hit a petrol station in Franeker off the shore. She had just passed a bridge and turned its stern to take a bend in the Van Harinxmakanaal. None of the station crew were hurt, and the damage amounted to thousands of guilders.

On March 28, 1991, Noordborg ran aground at Wells-next-the-Sea. She was refloated, and arrived in Dordrecht on October 4, 1991 while being declared a total constructive loss, being given up for scrap; instead, she was resold.
