= Sleeper dike =

Dike that backs up a front-line dike

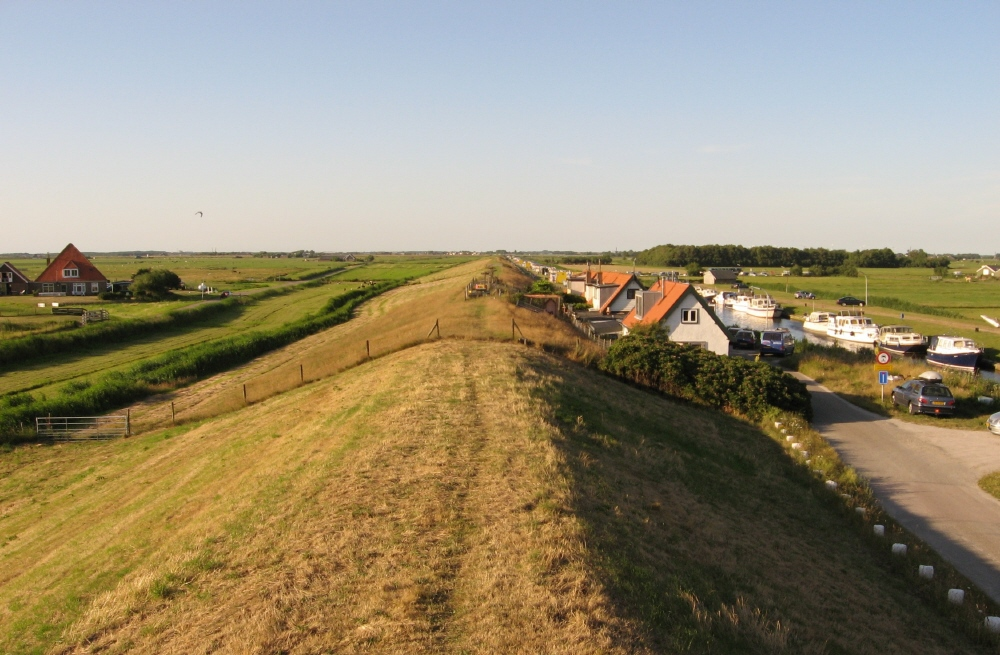
A typical sleeper dike near the Hondsbossche Zeewering. In 1570, this dike prevented the flooding of North Holland during the All Saints' Flood (1570) after the breakthrough of the Hondsbossche Zeewering.

A sleeper dike (in Dutch slaperdijk) is a dike which does not normally face water, but serves as a backup if a "front-line" dike in front of it breaks.

The sleeper dikes are usually located at places where there is a high risk of dike breakthrough or where there used to be such a risk. The dike is only potentially safeguarding the land from the sea/river, and is "sleeping", hence the name. Sometimes there is even a secondary sleeper dike, which can be called a "dreamer dike".

Many of the sleeper dikes are historical, and no longer have a function in protection against the water, after the dike improvements of the Delta Plan. However, in case of a breakthrough they do divide up the land in sections, and therefore stop the waterflow in some parts, and slow down in others. Also many of these dikes are protected because of their cultural historical and ecological value.
