= Suwâld =

Suwâld Suawoude
- Village
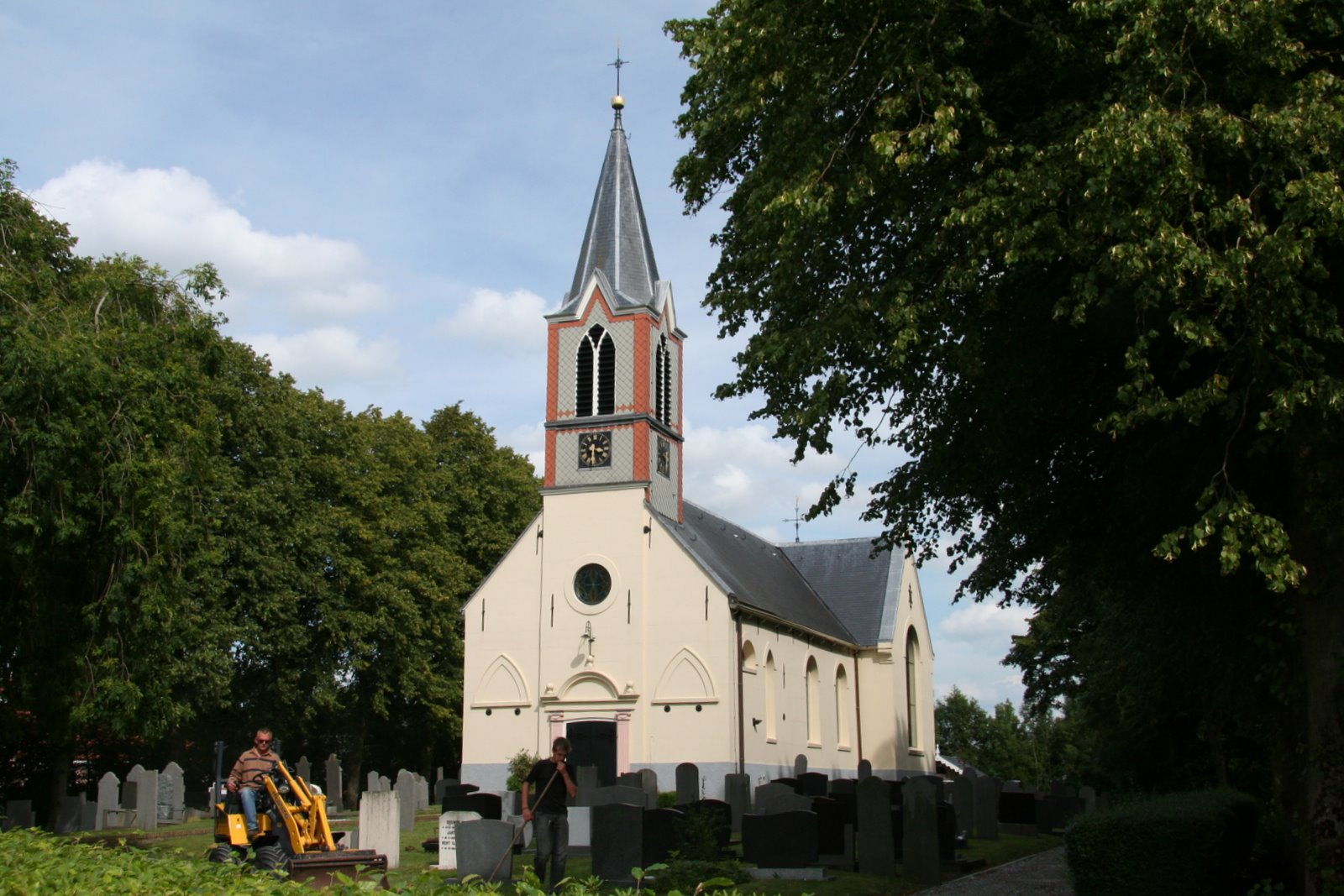
- Suwâld Church

- Coat of arms

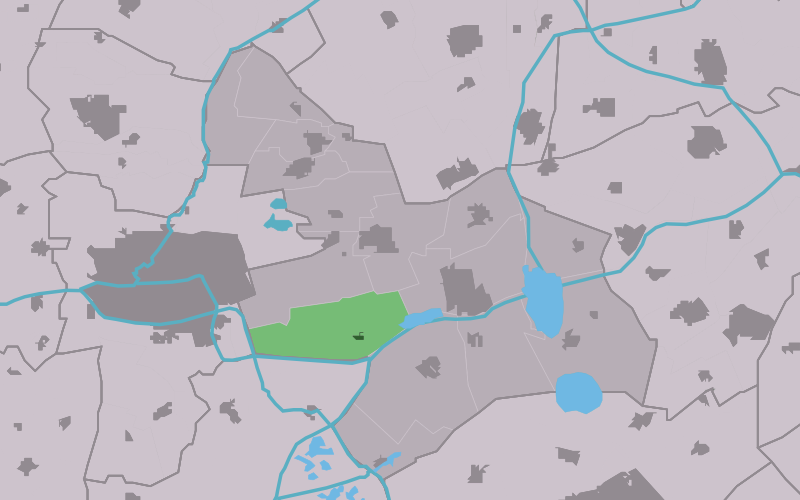
- Location of the village in Tytsjerksteradiel

- Location in the Netherlands Suwâld (Netherlands)
- Coordinates: 53°10′40″N 5°55′35″E
- Country: Netherlands
- Province: Friesland
- Municipality: Tytsjerksteradiel

Area
  - Total: 13.37 km^{2} (5.16 sq mi)
- Elevation: 0.9 m (3.0 ft)

Population (2021)
  - Total: 630
  - Density: 47/km^{2} (120/sq mi)
- Time zone: UTC+1 (CET)
  - Summer (DST): UTC+2 (CEST)
- Postal code: 9265
- Dialing code: 0511

Suwâld (Dutch: Suawoude) is a village in Tytsjerksteradiel municipality in the province of Friesland, the Netherlands. It had a population of around 652 in January 2017.

The village has a solar powered ferry for transporting pedestrians and bicycles called Schalkediep. It travels on the Prinses Margriet Canal from Garyp.

== History ==
The village was first mentioned in 1481 as Suwald, and means "southern swamp forest". Suwâld is located on an elongated narrow sandy ridge near the Wijde Ee river. It developed in the middle ages. The Dutch Reformed church probably dates from the 12th century. The tower collapsed in 1828, and in 1889 a new tower was added to the church.

Suwâld was home to 263 people in 1840.

== Population ==
- 1954 - 672
- 1959 - 613
- 1964 - 616
- 1969 - 589
- 1973 - 544
- 2006 - 622

== Gallery ==
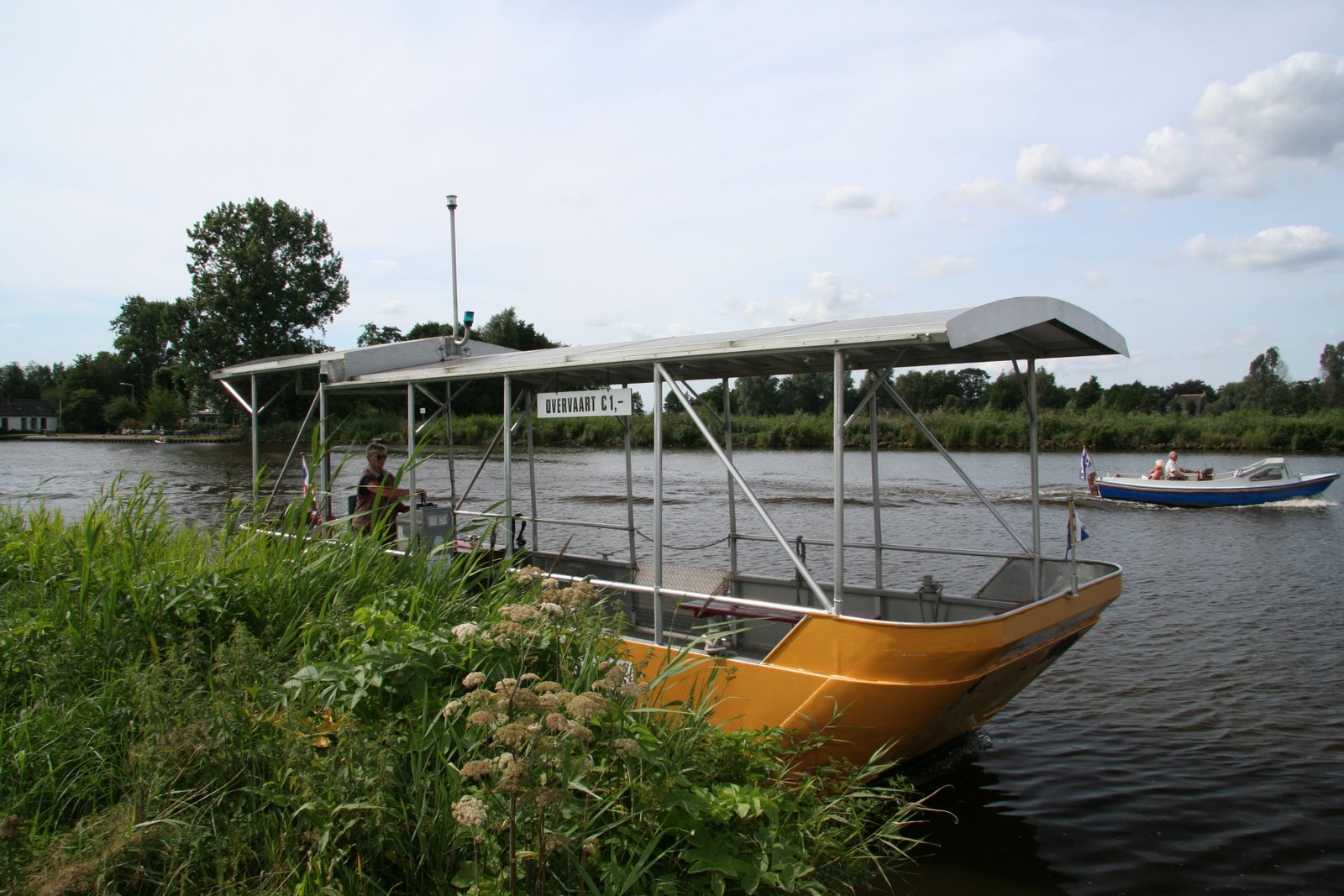
Ferry at Suawoude

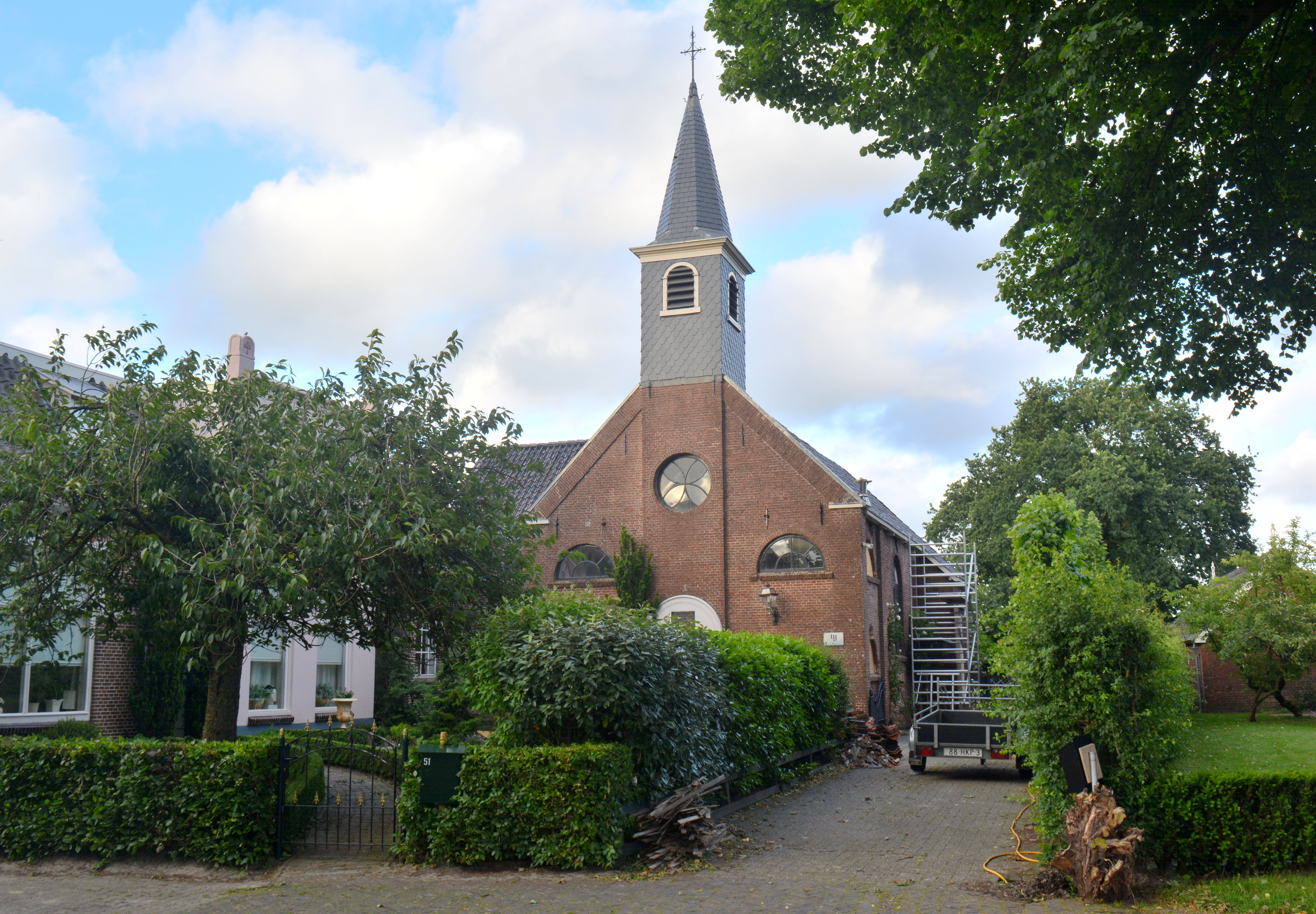
Former Reformed church

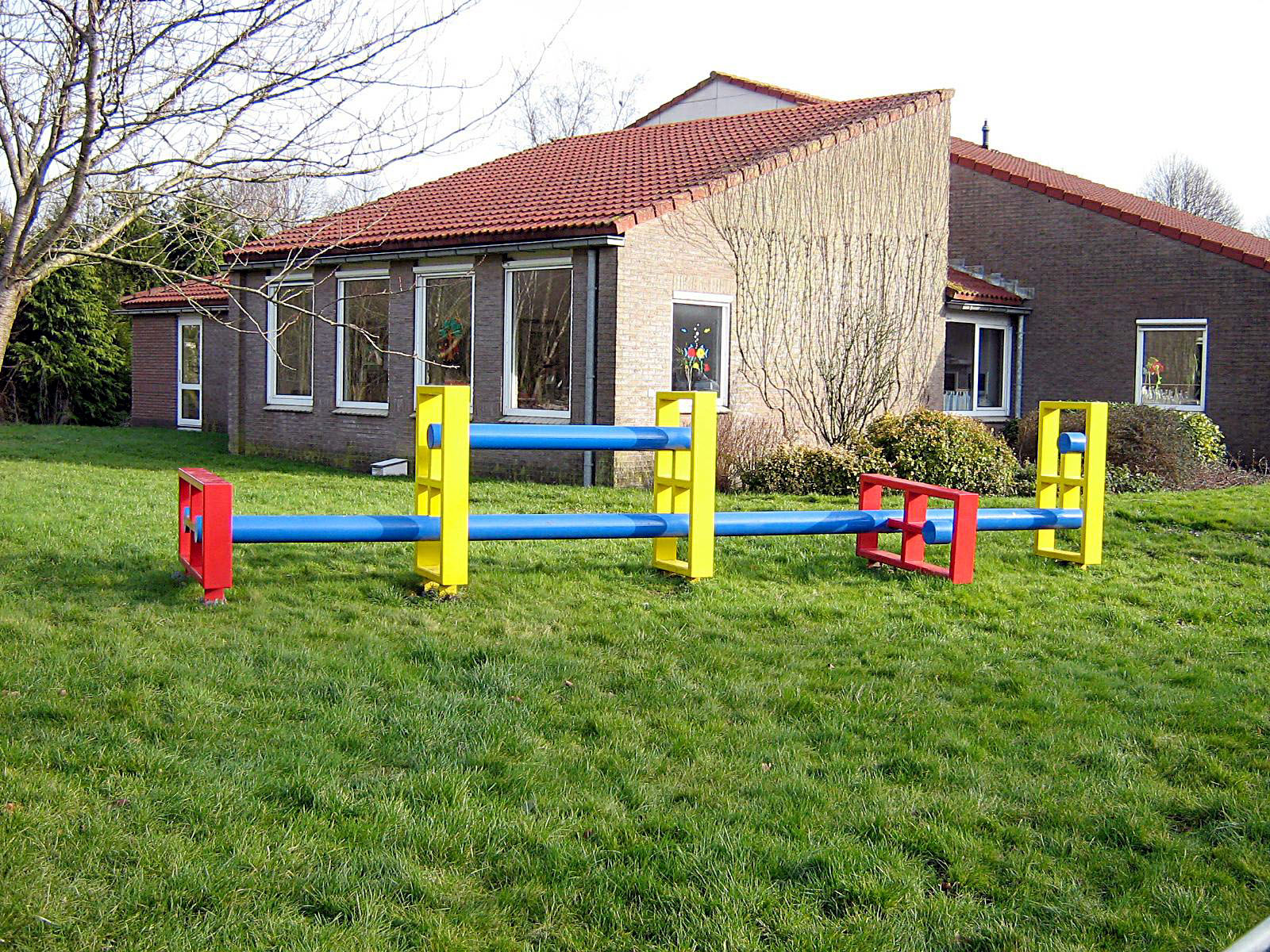
Elementary school

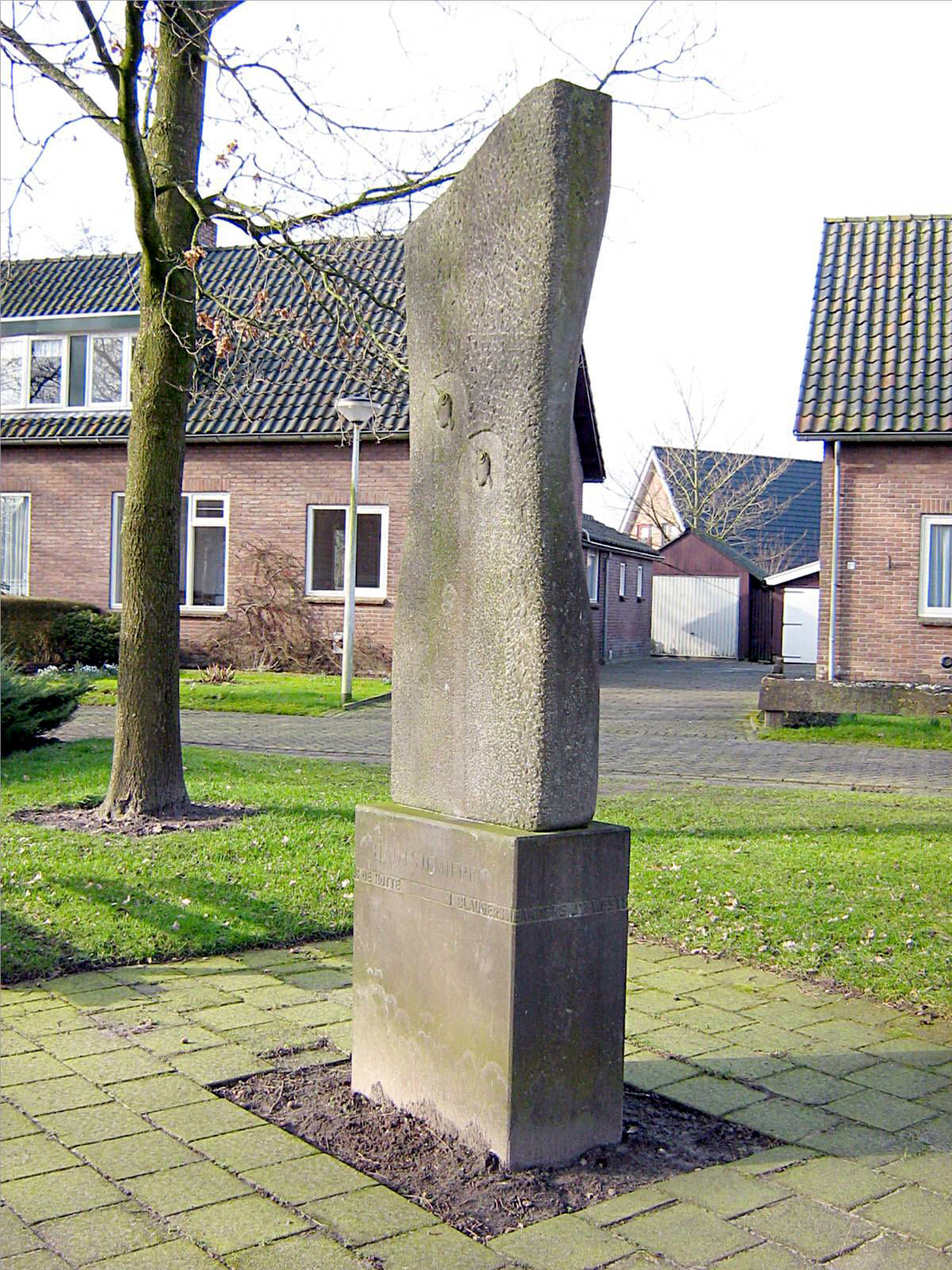
Statue in Suwâld
