= MV Kronprinsen =

1942 cargo ship

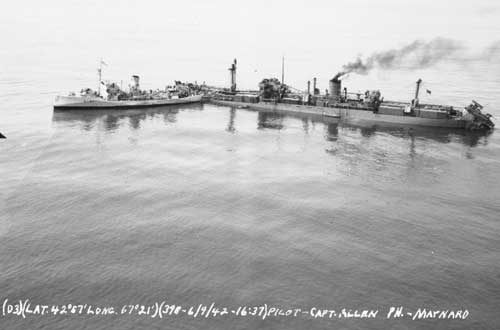
- Kronprinsen following the attack by U-432. HMCS Summerside is assisting her.

History
- Name: Empire Fairbairn (1942); Kronprinsen (1942–52); Vori (1952–67); Lukia M (1967–69)
- Owner: Ministry of War Transport (1942); Norwegian Government (1942–45); A/S Rudolf (1945–52); Rios Societe Navigazione SA (1952–53); Compagnia Navigazione Porto Alegre SA (1953-67); Liminship Compagnia Navigazione (1967–69); Chinese Government (1969– )
- Operator: Nortraship (1942–45); Olsen & Ugelstad (1945–52); Rios Societe Navigazione SA (1952–53); Compagnia Navigazione Porto Alegre SA (1953-67); L G Matsas (1967–69); Chinese Government (1969– )
- Port of registry: Glasgow, United Kingdom (1942); Oslo, Norway (1942–52); Panama City, Panama (1952–61); Syra, Greece (1961-66); (Greece) Piraeus (1966-69); China (1969– )
- Builder: Barclay, Curle & Co Ltd
- Yard number: 686
- Launched: 17 February 1942
- Out of service: 10 February 1969
- Identification: United Kingdom Official Number 147310; Code Letters LNAM (1952–52); IMO number: 5616128 ( –1969)
- Fate: Seized by Chinese Government

General characteristics
- Type: Cargo ship
- Tonnage: 7,078 GRT; 5,067 NRT; 10,458 DWT
- Length: 431 ft 3 in (131.45 m)
- Beam: 56 ft 3 in (17.15 m)
- Draught: 26 ft 9 1/2 in (8.166 m)
- Depth: 35 ft 2 in (10.72 m)
- Installed power: 516 nhp / 2,580 bhp
- Propulsion: 2SCSA diesel engine, single screw propeller
- Speed: 11 knots (20 km/h)
- Crew: 30
- Armament: Anti-torpedo nets (Kronprinsen, 1945)

Kronprinsen was a 7,078 GRT cargo ship that was built as Empire Fairbairn in 1942 by Barclay Curle & Co, Glasgow, Renfrewshire, United Kingdom for the Ministry of War Transport (MoWT). She was transferred to the Norwegian Government before completion and renamed Kronprinsen. She served until 9 June 1942, when she was torpedoed and damaged by U-432 off Cape Sable Island, Nova Scotia, Canada. She was under repair until October 1943.

In 1945, she was sold into merchant service. In 1952, she was sold to a Panamanian company and renamed Vori. In 1967, she was sold to a Greek company and renamed Lukia M. She sprang a leak on 10 February 1969, off Barren Island in the South China Sea, and was abandoned. The ship was towed to Shanghai, China, where it was reported that it had been seized by the Chinese Government.

== Description ==
The ship was built in 1942 by Barclay Curle & Co, Glasgow, Renfrewshire. She was yard number 686.

The ship was 431 feet 3 inches (131.45 m) long, with a beam of 56 feet 3 inches (17.15 m). She had a depth of 35 feet 2 inches (10.72 m) and a draught of 26 feet 9 1/2 inches (8.166 m). She was assessed at 7,078 GRT, 5,067 NRT, 10,458 DWT.

The ship was propelled by a two-stroke Single Cycle, Single Action diesel engine, which had three cylinders of 23 5/8 inches (60 cm) diameter by 91 3/16 inches (231.6 cm) stroke driving a screw propeller. The engine was built by Barclay Curle. It was rated at 516 nhp, 2,580 bhp. It could propel her at 11 knots (20 km/h).

== History ==
=== World War II ===
Empire Fairbairn was launched on 17 February 1942. Her port of registry was Glasgow. On 27 April, Empire Fairbairn was transferred to the Norwegian Government and renamed Kronprinsen. She was placed under the management of Nortraship. Her port of registry was Oslo and the Code Letters LNAM were allocated.

Kronprinsen made her maiden voyage on 1 May 1942, departing from the Clyde for Baltimore, Maryland, United States. She joined Convoy ON 91, which departed from Liverpool, Lancashire and dispersed at sea on 15 May at 42°18′N 69°15′W. She arrived at New York on 17 May, departing two days later for Baltimore, where she arrived on 20 May. Kronprinsen sailed on 31 May and arrived at New York on 2 June. She sailed on 7 June, joining Convoy BX 23A, which departed from Portland, Maine the next day and arrived at Halifax, Nova Scotia, Canada on 10 June. Kronprinsen was carrying general cargo, including calcium carbide, cotton and flour.

Location where Empire Fairbairn was torpedoed and damaged off Nova Scotia, Canada.

At 13:01 German time on 9 June, Kronprinsen was hit by two of four torpedoes that had been fired by U-432, which was under the command of Heinz-Otto Schultze. One of the other torpedoes damaged the British cargo ship Malayan Prince. One torpedo hit the ship on the port side between № 1 and № 2 holds, blowing a hole 21 by 8 feet (6.4 m × 2.4 m) and flooding the holds. The second torpedo hit the stern of the ship, destroying her rudder, causing the collapse of the after deck and flooding № 6 hold. Her cargo was set on fire, and two crew may have been killed. Kronprinsen was south of Cape Sable Island, Nova Scotia (42°53′N 67°11′W) at the time of the attack. She was to drift for twenty hours before an American and two Canadian tugs came to her rescue. It took five days to tow her to West Pubnico, where Kronprinsen was beached.

The cargo was unloaded from Kronprinsen to enable temporary repairs to be carried out. The hole on the port side was sealed with a tarpaulin, cement and horse manure. Damaged bags of flour were thrown overboard. They were salvaged by local inhabitants who welcomed the free supply at a time when food was rationed. Local inhabitants were employed in the work to unload and repair the ship. They charged 60¢ per hour, which was described as "outrageous" at the time.

On 23 July, Kronprinsen departed under tow, bound for Halifax, where she arrived the next day. She left Halifax under tow on 7 October, bound for Boston, Massachusetts, United States, where she arrived on 9 October. Permanent repairs were carried out at Boston. Kronprinsen sailed from Boston on 1 April 1943, bound for New York. She joined Convoy HX 233, which departed on 6 April and arrived at Liverpool on 21 April. She was carrying fuel oil and general cargo, and four passengers. She arrived at the Eastham Oil Terminal, Eastham, Cheshire on 22 April and then sailed to Manchester, Lancashire, where she arrived the next day.

Kronprinsen sailed from Manchester to Eastham on 13 May, departing Eastham the next day for Barrow in Furness, Lancashire. She sailed from Barrow in Furness on 29 May for Liverpool, arriving two days later. She was a member of Convoy ON 187, which departed on 1 June and arrived at New York on 15 June. She left the convoy and sailed to Philadelphia, Pennsylvania, where she arrived on 16 June. On 3 July, Kronprinsen sailed for the Hampton Roads, Virginia, arriving the next day. She joined Convoy UGS 12, which sailed on 12 July and joined with Convoy KMS 21 on 29 July. KMS 21 had departed from Gibraltar that day and arrived at Port Said, Egypt on 9 August. Kronprinsen called at Alexandria before reaching Port Said. She sailed on 11 August for Suez, arriving later that day and sailing on 14 August for Aden, where she arrived on 19 August. She then joined Convoy AP 42, which sailed on 22 August bound for Bandar Abbas, Iran. She arrived at the Shatt al-Arab on 30 August and Basrah, Iraq the next day. Kronprinsen then sailed to Abadan, Iran, arriving on 7 September and then returning to Basrah, where she arrived on 17 September. She departed on 13 October for Bandar Abbas. Kronprinsen joined convoy PA 57, which departed on 16 October and arrived at Aden on 24 October. She arrived at Masireh, Oman on 23 October and sailed from Aden the next day for Suez, which was reached on 30 October. Kronprinsen arrived at Port Said on 1 November. She sailed on 17 November for Suez, arriving the next day and sailing on 22 November for Aden, which was reached five days later. Kronprinsen was a member of Convoy AB 23, which departed on 6 December and arrived at Bombay, India on 14 December. She was bound for Fremantle, Australia, which was reached on 28 December.

On 1 January 1944, Kronprinsen sailed for Iquique, Chile, arriving on 6 February. She sailed four days later for Tocopilla, arriving the same day. She departed on 12 February for Wellington, New Zealand, where she arrived on 13 March. Kronprinsen sailed on 13 March for Aden, arriving on 21 April and departing the next day for Suez, which was reached on 28 April. On 6 May, she sailed to Abu Sultan, returning to Suez on 15 May. She departed the next day for Aden, arriving on 21 May and sailing the same day for Mombasa, Kenya, which was reached on 31 May. Kronprinsen was a member of Convoy KD 4, which sailed from Kilindini on 4 June and arrived at Durban, South Africa on 14 June. She left the convoy at Lourenço Marques, Mozambique on 13 June.

Kronprinsen sailed on 7 July for Aden, arriving on 20 July. She departed that day for Suez, arriving a week later and then sailing for Port Said, which was reached on 28 July. She departed that day for Alexandria, arriving the next day. Kronprinsen sailed on 4 August, joining Convoy GUS 48, which had departed from Port Said the previous day and arrived at the Hampton Roads on 28 August. She made good time, arriving at New York on 27 August. She sailed on 23 September for the Hampton Roads. Kronprinsen was a member of Convoy UGS 55B, which departed on 27 September and arrived at Casablanca, Morocco on 13 October. She left the convoy near its destination and sailed on to Oran, Algeria, arriving the next day. She sailed on 19 October, joining Convoy UGS 56, which had departed from the Hampton Roads on 2 October and arrived at Port Said on 28 October. Kronprinsen sailed immediately for Suez and Aden, where she arrived on 3 November. She departed the next day for Karachi, India, arriving there on 10 November. She sailed nine days later for Cochin, where she arrived on 29 November, departing that day for Colombo, Ceylon, which was reached the next day.

Kronprinsen departed from Colombo on 12 January 1945 for Aden, arriving on 21 January. She sailed the next day, arriving at Suez on 28 January and departing that day for Port Said. She sailed on 31 January for Gibraltar, where she arrived on 9 February. Kronprinsen joined Convoy MKS 83G, which departed on 14 February and arrived at Liverpool on 22 February. She was carrying general cargo and armed with anti-torpedo nets. Her destination was Gravesend, Kent, which was reached on 22 February.

Kronprinsen sailed on 23 March for Liverpool. She was a member of Convoy JW 66, which departed from the Clyde on 16 April and arrived at the Kola Inlet on 25 April. She returned to the United Kingdom with Convoy RA 67, which departed on 23 May and arrived at the Clyde on 30 May.

=== Post-war ===
Kronprinsen arrived at Greenock, Renfrewshire, on 5 June, sailing the next day. Her destination was stated to be Buenos Aires, Argentina. She arrived at Montevideo, Uruguay on 26 June, sailing two days later with a stated destination of Freetown and Las Palmas, Spain. She arrived at São Vicente, Cape Verde on 13 August, sailing that day for Falmouth, Cornwall, United Kingdom. On 17 August, she called at Tenerife, Canary Islands, Spain, receiving orders to sail to Oslo, Norway. Kronprinsen arrived at Christiansand on 28 August. She sailed on 2 September for Moss.

Kronprinsen sailed from Oslo on 14 September with a stated destination of New York. She arrived at Baltimore, Maryland on 30 September, sailing on 7 October for Kirkwall, Orkney Islands, United Kingdom and Oslo. On or about 22 October, she ran aground near Kirkwall. She was refloated and arrived at Oslo on 24 October. In November, Kronprinsen was sold to A/S Rudolf for Kr.4,400,000. She was placed under the management of Olsen & Ugelstad, Oslo. She sailed on 26 November for Baltimore, where she arrived on 5 December, departing four days later for Kirkwall and Oslo. She arrived at Falmouth on 23 December, sailing that day of Oslo, which was reached on 27 December. Kronprinsen sailed on 11 January 1946 for Baltimore, arriving on 12 February. She then made a return voyage to Bergen, Norway, arriving back at Baltimore on 3 April. She departed on 15 April bound for Cuba.

Location where Lukia M sprang a leak and was abandoned, shown in relation to China.

In January 1952, Kronprinsen was sold to Rios Societe Navigazione SA, Panama for £527,000 and was renamed Vori. In 1953, Vori was sold to Compagnia Navigazione Porto Alegre SA, Panama. On 5 January 1955, Vori was on a voyage from Baltimore to Bremen, West Germany with a cargo of grain when she sprang a leak 95 nautical miles (176 km) north east of Bermuda. USCGC Bibb and a Boeing B-29 Superfortress from Kindley Air Force Base, Bermuda were sent to look for the ship, and give her 30 crew assistance. She reached Bermuda on 6 January with two holds flooded. A crewmember had been injured during a storm and was taken ashore for treatment at a hospital. Vori was reflagged to Greece in 1961, with Syra as her port of registry. In 1966, Vori was sold to Liminship Compagnia Navigazione, Piraeus and renamed Lukia M. She was placed under the management of L G Matsas, Piraeus.

On 10 February 1969, Lukia M was on a voyage from Safaga, Egypt to Korea when she sprang a leak. She was 50 nautical miles (93 km) south west of Barren Island (29°29′N 124°16′E). Lukia M was abandoned by her crew. She was later towed into Shanghai, China, arriving on 25 February. Lukia M was seized by the Chinese Government. It is presumed that Lukia M was later scrapped in China; there are unconfirmed reports to this effect.
