= Almenum =

- Village
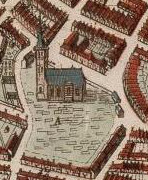
- The church of Almenum drawn on a map of Harlingen 1664

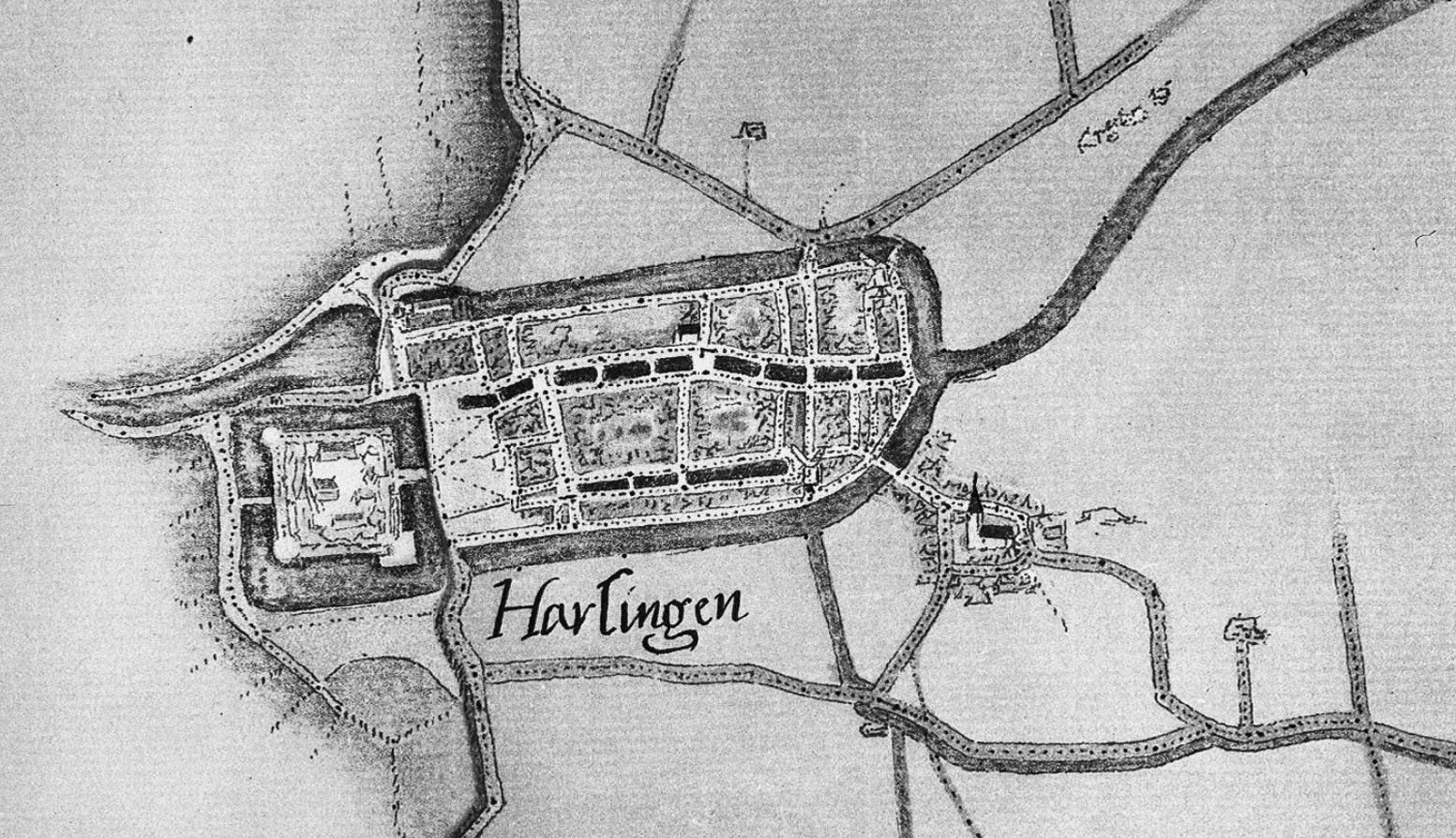
- Coordinates: 53°11′N 5°26′E
- Country: Netherlands
- Province: Friesland
- gemeente: Harlingen

Population
  - Total: c. 0

Almenum is a historic locality in the northern Netherlands, near Midlum, Friesland the site of the first Christian church in Friesland. Saint Boniface set up a local church in the locality in 754. The location of the church is on the Terp of Almenum, a mound of earth about five meters high. Almenum is named after the place where someone called "Allaman" lived. The -um suffix is derived from the West Frisian word "hiem" meaning "home". An alternative explanation for the name of the locality is that it originally meant common lands for grazing cattle. In Icelandic this kind of land still uses the term "almenningurheim".

== Legendary origin ==
Almenum is the first place missionary to the Frisians, Boniface visited in 754 AD. According to legend, it is the site of the first Christian church building in Friesland built in 777 AD by Gustavus Forteman the father of the legendary Magnus Forteman who both lived nearby. The church building was originally a thatched wooden structure. It was dedicated to the archangel Michael. The wooden church was 10.25 × 22.5 meters in size. It burned down twice and was rebuilt.

A legend says that a miraculous red banner called Magnusvaan was included in the walls of the St. Michaëlsdom church. This flag, according to legend, belonged to Friso the founder of the Frisian people. It had miraculous powers to avert lightning and storms, to repel evil spirits, and make one invincible. After Friso's death he was buried with the flag and no one knew of it. Willibrord the apostle to the Frisians, had a dream where an angel pointed out the spot where the red flag lay buried. The bishop Willibrord excavated it and gave it to Magnus Forteman. The flag was used when Magnus conquered Rome. After this it was hidden again in the wall of the church at Almenum. The Saxons searched for it and could not find it, and legend has it that no one will be able to find it.

Jancko Douwama recorded this legend, but also named Oldeboorn or Ferwoude as possible locations. Ferwoude adopted a red background for its own flag in honour of this legendary flag.

Another story called Magnuskeren says that Magnus Forteman received a charter from Pope Leo III and emperor Charles recording seven keren, Seventeen Statutes, Twenty Four Landlaws (Landrechten Keuren) and 36 Synod Laws. He hung this charter in the St. Michael's church. The reason this church was chosen, was because there were very few churches in Frisia at the time.

== Medieval history ==
The Harns and Harliga families occupied fortified estates in the west of Almenum. They jostled for preeminence and were rivals. On Easter day in the year 1064 Ruurd Jans Harliga killed Sasker Harns in a dispute about who would first make an offering for the poor at the church. This triggered a vendetta involving three families. The Gratinga, Gerbranda, and Harns families were killing and massacring each other for over a century. It culminated in Douwe Harns stabbing Sikke Gratinga's son with a pitchfork as he crossed Harns land on the way to the Gratinga property in 1133. Outrage ensued, and the country was split into two opposed factions. The Harns stins was put under siege and eventually conquered and the killer and his family brought to justice. The stins was razed to the ground. A treaty was agreed to in 1148, called "a covenant of satisfaction". The parties pretended to agree, but actually dissatisfaction simmered beneath.

In 1157 Eilwardus Ludinga founded a monastery called Ludingakerke. The monks of the monastery dug canals from Almenum to an already existing channel past Vlieland and Texel to provide access to trading vessels. (In these times the coast was in a completely different spot, and the Marne and Vlie may have provided part of the route.) Ludingakerk became one of the richest monasteries in Friesland. The area west of Almenum, became more important and turned into the city of Harlingen. In the 13th century the wooden building was replaced by a stone church with a hall with twin aisles.

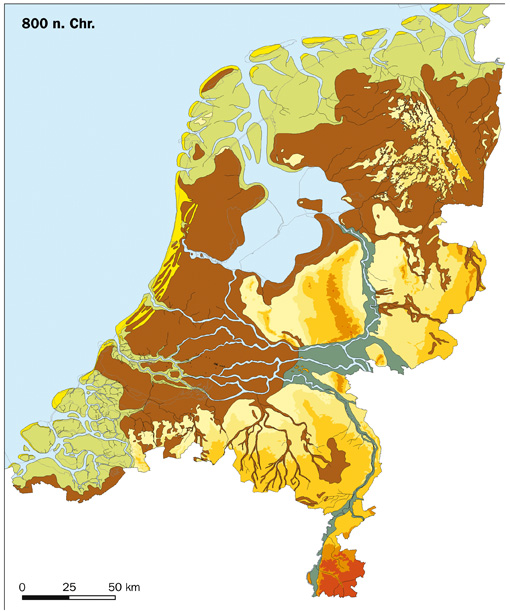
When Almenum was established, it was nowhere near the sea. The major nearby watercourse was the Vlie, connecting the lake Almere to the North Sea

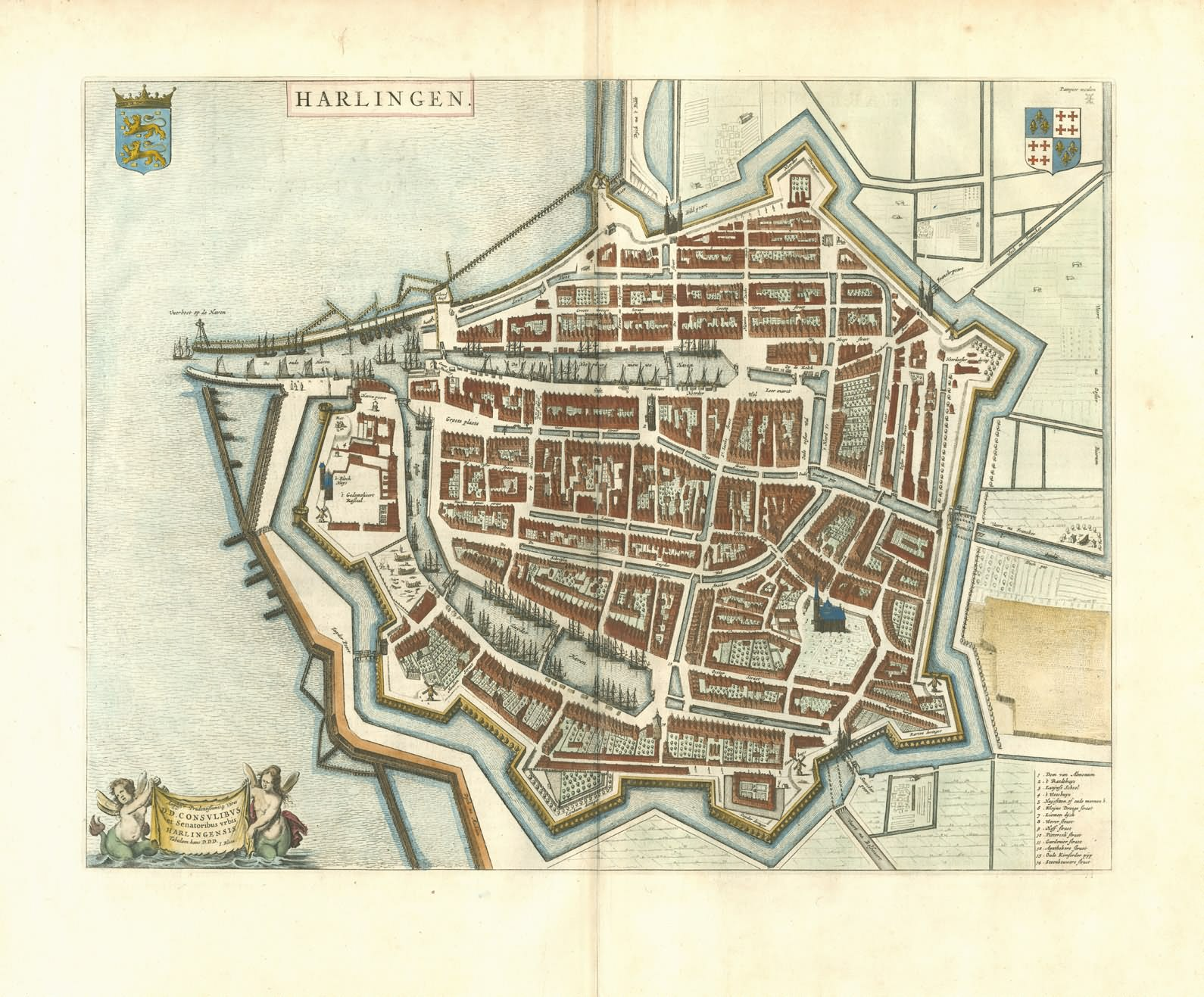
By 1649 the Cathedral of Almenum is enclosed in the Harlingen city walls, seen in the clear patch in the southeast of the city.

Somewhere between the 10th and 12th century the old wooden building was replaced by one made from tufa with a tower.

In 1234 AD Harlingen was recognised officially as a city near to the west of Almenum.

On 14 December 1287, the devastating St. Lucia's flood permanently altered the landscape creating the Zuiderzee and bringing the Wadden Sea coast to Harlingen, and thereby giving it the opportunity to become a seaport. Nearby villages Berdingadorp, Medumwart, Dikesherna and parts of the Gerbranda estate lands were lost due to sea encroachment. The church at Berdingadorp was merged with the church at Almenum.

Schelte Roorda beat Douwe Edes Gerbranda to death in 1453 in Bolsward, and sought sanctuary in the Almenum church. However he was slaughtered in a revenge killing by Herring of Woldens and Bonne Bonninga. Ede Douwez Gerbranda belonged to the Vetkopers

At a later point, perhaps somewhere between 1200 and 1500, an inscription in the St. Michael's church stated that the bones of Magnus of Anagni, Martyr and Bishop were transported from Fondi to the church at the time of a Saracen invasion in Italy. The inscription was certainly real, but the story it gave, may not be.

== Loss of identity ==
Philip II of Spain granted Harlingen permission to include Almenum within its border in 1563. This caused a dispute with Barradeel which also claimed the hamlet. The city of Harlingen expanded, and by 1580 the Cathedral of Almenum and most of the village was within the city walls. The church at that time was the reformed church for residents of Harlingen. This was only resolved in 1684 when Henry Casimir II, Prince of Nassau-Dietz decided that it belonged to Harlingen.

The church contained a tomb of D. Georgius of Espelbach, grietman of Barradeel, and mayor of Harlingen who died 19 March 1575 at the age of 63.

The St. Michaëlsdom church was demolished in 1771 and replaced by a new cross-shaped structure called the Grote Kerk which stands till this day. Construction started on 25 May 1772 and the church was opened on New Year's Day 1775. The Bible reading used for the opening was from John 10:22. The tower from the old church was not demolished, but instead refaced with new stone.

At the beginning of the nineteenth century there were two brickworks in Almenum. The area was suitable because it was near a seaport where bricks were needed as ballast in ships.

Jan van der Geest was recorded as a silversmith from Almenum from 1790 to 1800.

As a result of the First French Empire annexing the Netherlands, Almenum was created as a canton (French municipality) in the Frise department between 1 January 1812 and 1 October 1816. The municipality was bounded on the north by Sexbierum, Tjum to the east and northeast, Franeker to the northeast, Arum to the south, and Harlingen to the west. Villages included in the municipality were Midlum, Achlum, Koningsbuurt, and what are now eastern and northern parts of Harlingen.

== Legacy ==
Using the name nowadays there is a home for the elderly called Almenum across the other side of the van Harinxmakanaal, and a hotel in nearby Harlingen.

A Frisian flax variety with white flowers was named "Almenum". A small bulk freighter was called Almenum.
