= Dimidiation =

Combination of two coats of arms

Coat of arms of Hastings, showing a partially dimidiated shield, where the front halves of the upper and lower lions are joined to the rear halves of ships. This motif features widely in the heraldry of the Cinque Ports.

Horizontally dimidiated rabbit and fish, arms of the town and gmina of Prochowice, SW Poland. Horizontal dimidiations are rare, if not unknown, in English heraldry.

Coat of arms of the consolidated commune of Les Andelys, dimidiated (French: Mi-parti) per pale, three droops of grapes and three castle keeps. Dimidiations are rare in French heraldry.

In heraldry, dimidiation is a method of marshalling (heraldically combining) two coats of arms.

For a time, dimidiation preceded the method known as impalement. Whereas impalement involves placing the whole of both coats of arms side by side in the same shield, dimidiation involves placing the dexter half of one coat of arms alongside the sinister half of the other. In the case of marriage, the dexter half of the husband's arms would be placed alongside the sinister half of the wife's arms.

The practice fell out of use because the result was not always aesthetically pleasing (sometimes creating strange hybrids), and also because in some cases, it would have resulted in a shield that confusingly looked like one coat of arms rather than a combination of two. For instance, a bend combined with a bend sinister might result in a combination that simply looked like a chevron, thus hiding the fact that two coats of arms had been combined.

In order to avoid these drawbacks, it became customary to use more than half of each coat of arms when combining them through dimidiation. Once this practice had begun, the logical progression was to include the whole of both coats of arms in the new shield, so that in effect, impalement replaced dimidiation as a method of combining coats of arms.

A general rule which carries over from dimidiation to impalement is that if a coat of arms with a bordure (or tressure, orle, etc.) is impaled, the bordure should not continue down the line of impalement.

== Gallery ==
Example of two coats dimidiated

The same two coats impaled

When the dexter half of a bend sinister is dimidiated with the sinister half of a bend, the result would look like a chevron

Tressure does not continue down the line of impalement

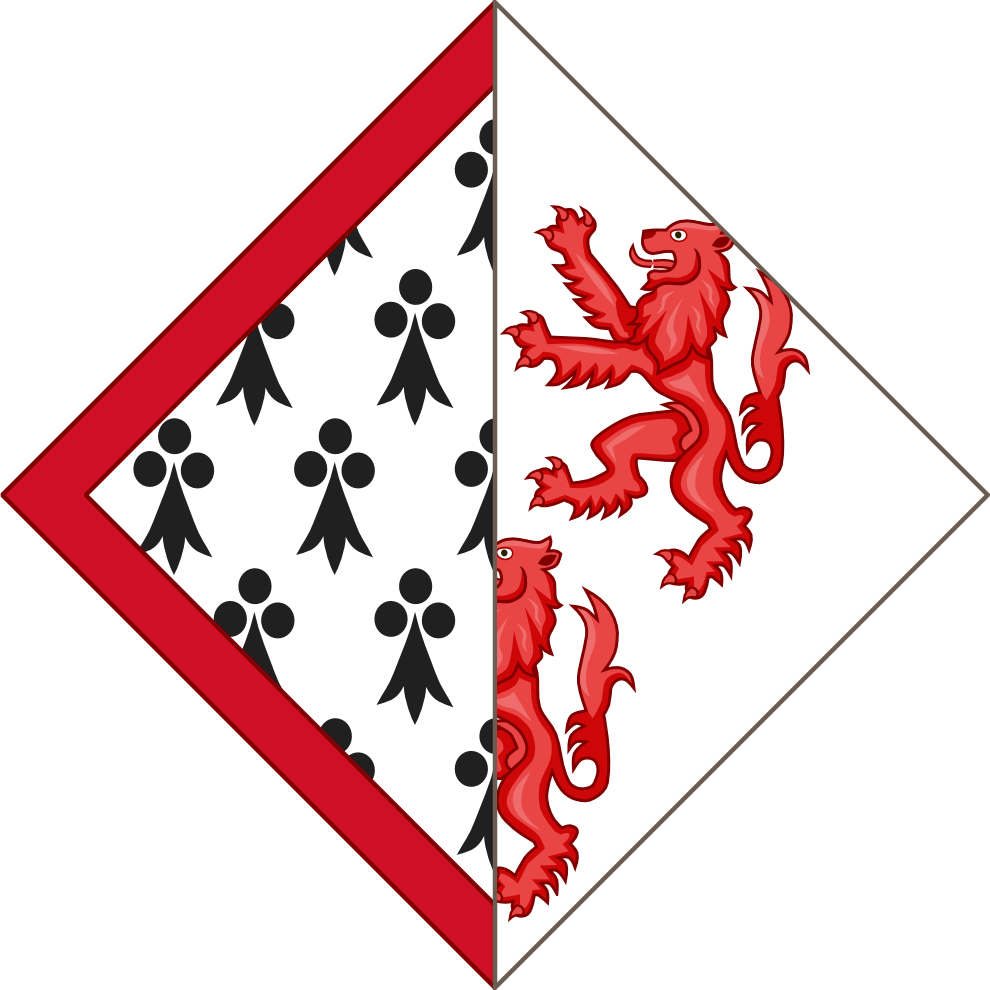
Coat of arms of Anne de Pisseleu, Countess of Penthièvre, Duchess of Étampes

== See also ==
- Division of the field
- Frisian eagle

== Sources ==
- Arthur Charles Fox-Davies, A Complete Guide to Heraldry (1909), pp. 182, 523-525. Online texts at https://archive.org/details/completeguidetoh00foxduoft or https://www7b.biglobe.ne.jp/~bprince/hr/foxdavies/index.htm .
