= Biniaterp =

Biniaterp, originally Berdingadorp was a village in Friesland Netherlands, to the south of Harlingen. Much of it was lost due to flooding caused by sea encroachment. Villages Medumwart, Dikesherna and parts of the Gerbranda estate lands were also lost due to sea encroachment. The church at Berdingadorp was merged with the church at Almenum. In 1471 the place as known as Bengeterp, and in 1546 as Benyeterp

In 1852 the name appears on a map by Eekhoff as Biniaterp.

Notable residents include Upcke te Birdingaterp who made a treaty with Ocko ten Broek and the city of Groningen in 1420. His son Renick Upckes received a document of safe passage from the count of Holland in 1423. Upcke te Birdingaterp died in 1426, but was buried at Hitsum. His son Upcke Renicks purchased the nearby Gratinga estate in Almenum, but after that had nothing to do with Biniaterp. In 1511 two plots of land were recorded as belonging to Biniaterp, by 1700 there was only 1 plot of 9 perches, and by 1718 there were no longer any houses. The name was brought back to life with a farm later in the 19th century.
