= Karelsprivilege =

Karelsprivilege is a legendary privilege that Charlemagne allegedly paid to the Frisians led by Magnus Forteman to thank them for their support for his attack on Rome. Beginning in the 13th century, Frisians regularly mentioned Karelsprivilege in legal and historical works. The authenticity of the privilege has been contested in recent centuries. The privilege formed the basis of so-called Frisian freedom, and was recognized as genuine by Holy Roman emperors. An affirmation and recognition of the privilege was given by Emperor Conrad II in 1039.

The original is lost. According to tradition it was inscribed on the wall of a church, possibly the church of Almenum, Ferwoude or Oldeboorn. Copies were made and circulated during the Middle Ages; possibly forgeries.

In the Middle Ages, only the original, undamaged sealing wax impressions, were accepted as valid. Forged documents were common, and no well-organized archive of treaty documents that could serve as a reference existed. Medieval literature mentioned a link between the Frisian eagle as a heraldic charge in coats of arms and Karelsprivilege. However, in the time of Charlemagne family or regional coat of arms did not exist, although it could have been used as a banner in that period.

Other names used for this charter are: Magnuskerren, Friezenprivilege, Vrijheidsprivilege, Libertas Frisonica or Previlegii Frisiorum Caroli Magni.

== Background ==
Between 650 and 750 the Franks significantly expanded their realm and conquered a large part of Frisia. That conquest was not complete. The part already conquered remained in unsettled ownership (see the death of Boniface). East of the Lauwers, together with Saxony, Frisia continued to oppose the Franks.

Charlemagne eventually succeeded, breaking the Saxons' last resistance in 785. The Saxons were led by Widukind and were beaten during the Saxon Wars. One of Charlemagne's first steps afterwards was enumerating the local customs. For Frisia that meant the codification of the Lex Frisionum. To what extent this led to the imposition of law on the Frisians is unknown.

The core of the privilege was that this freedom was returned to the Frisians. The Lex said the Frisians received the freedom to apply those rights, but not that they were forced to do so.

== Meaning ==
The Frisian Countries up to the beginning of the sixteenth century developed in a unique way, without the feudal system introduced by Charlemagne in other areas.

== Bibliography ==
- Friesche Almanac 1892

=== Literature ===
- A. Janse, De waarheid van een falsum. Op zoek naar de politieke context van het Karelsprivilege, De Vrije Fries, (The truth of a falsehood. Looking at the political context of the Karelsprivilege, in The Free Frisian), volume LXXI (1991) p7-28
- T. van der Laars, Wapens, vlaggen en zegels van Nederland, (weapons, flags and seals in the Netherlands), Amsterdam (1913), reprint 1989, pp 57–60.
