= De Achlumer Molen, Achlum =

Smock mill in Friesland, Netherlands

De Achlumer Molen
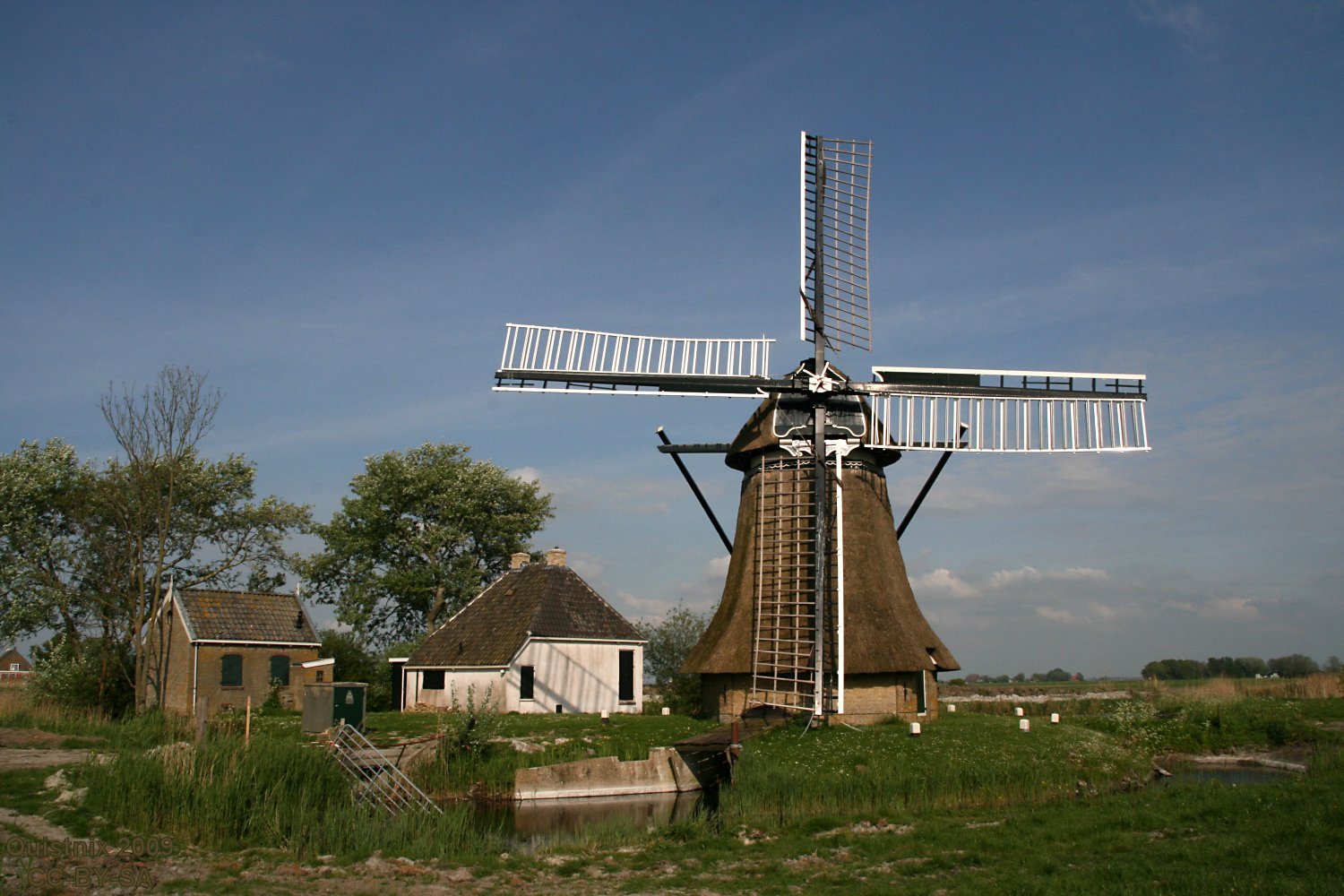
- De Achlumer Molen, May 2009
- Interactive map of De Achlumer Molen

Origin
- Mill name: De Achlumer Molen
- Mill location: Hitzumerweg 3, 8806 TR Achlum
- Coordinates: 53°09′12.68″N 5°30′5.29″E
- Operator: Stichting De Fryske Mole
- Year built: 1851

Information
- Purpose: Drainage mill
- Type: Smock mill
- Storeys: Three-storey smock
- Base storeys: Single-storey base
- Smock sides: Eight sides
- No. of sails: Four sails
- Type of sails: Two Common sails and two Patent sails
- Winding: Tailpole and winch
- Type of pump: Archimedes' screw

De Achlumer Molen is a smock mill in Achlum, Friesland, Netherlands which has been restored to working order. The mill is listed as a Rijksmonument, number 15821.

== History ==
De Achlumer Molen was built in 1851 to drain the Achlumer Noorderpolder. It worked by wind until 1954 when the cap and sails were removed and the smock tower fitted with a thatched conical roof. After that, an electric motor drove the Archimedes' screw.

In 1981, the mill was bought by Stichting De Fryske Mole (English: The Frisian Mills Foundation). The previous owner, Haye Thomas, a Dutch TV journalist, sold the mill for ƒ1. In September 2006 it was decided to restore the mill. The work was undertaken in the summer of 2007. On 18 October 2007 the new cap and sails were fitted to the mill. The restoration was carried out by Bouwbedrijf Hiemsta of Arum.

== Description ==
De Achlumer Molen is what the Dutch describe as an achtkante grondzeiler – a smock mill whose sails reach almost to the ground. It is a three-storey smock mill on a single-storey base. The smock and cap are thatched. The mill is winded by a tailpole and winch. The sails are one pair of Common sails and one pair of Patent sails. The Common sails are carried on the inner stock. They have a span of 18.60 metres (61 ft 0 in); the Patent sails are carried on the outer stock. They have a span of 18.70 metres (61 ft 4 in). They are carried on a cast-iron windshaft which was cast by Koning in 1909. It is 4.15 metres (13 ft 7 in) long. The Brake wheel has 51 cogs. It drives the wallower (27 cogs) at the top of the upright shaft. At the lower end of the upright shaft, the crown wheel (42 cogs) drives the Archimedes' screw via a gearwheel with 39 cogs. The steel screw is 1.20 metres (3 ft 11 in) diameter and 4.45 metres (14 ft 7 in) long, its axle is 500 millimetres (1 ft 8 in) diameter. It is inclined at 22½°. Each revolution of the screw lifts 561 litres (123 imp gal) of water.

== Public access ==
Achlumer Molen is open to the public on the Dutch National Mills Day and also on the Frisian Mills Day.
