= Midlum, Netherlands =

Midlum Mullum
- Village
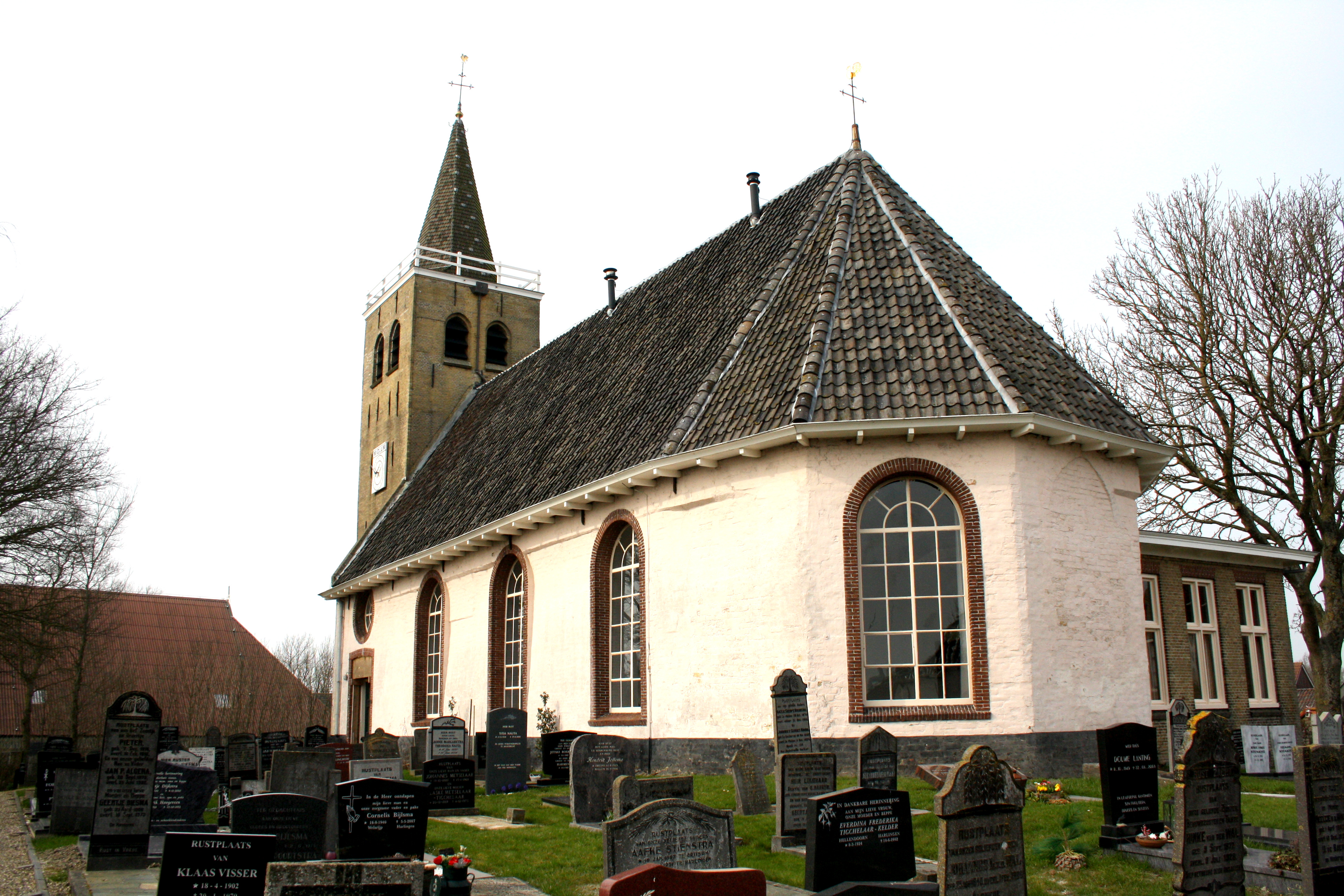
- St. Nicholas' church in Midlum

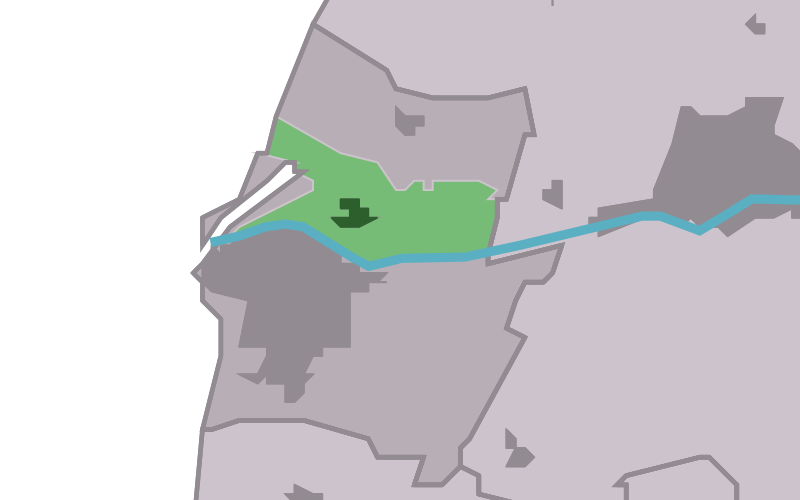
- Location in Harlingen

- Location in the Netherlands Midlum (Netherlands)
- Coordinates: 53°10′56″N 5°26′51″E
- Country: Netherlands
- Province: Friesland
- Municipality: (Harlingen, Netherlands) Harlingen

Area
  - Total: 4.63 km^{2} (1.79 sq mi)
- Elevation: 0.5 m (1.6 ft)

Population (2021)
  - Total: 615
  - Density: 133/km^{2} (344/sq mi)
- Time zone: UTC+1 (CET)
  - Summer (DST): UTC+2 (CEST)
- Postal code: 8872
- Dialing code: 0517

Midlum (Dutch pronunciation: [ˈmɪtlʏm]; West Frisian: Mullum) is a village in north Netherlands. It is located in the municipality of Harlingen, Friesland and has a population of around 645.

The village was first mentioned in the 13th century as Middelum, and means "settlement in the middle". The church dates from around 1200. In 1840, it was home to 439 people. The village used to be part of Franekeradeel, but was moved to the municipality of Harlingen in 1971.

== Transportation ==
Midlum-Herbaijum railway station was on the Harlingen - Stiens line of the North Friesland Railway, which opened on 1 October 1903 to Tzummarum and Harlingen on 2 May 1904. The passenger service ceased on 15 May 1936. Closure of the line to Harlingen was on 11 January 1938 and to Tzummarum on 7 December 1961.

== Gallery ==
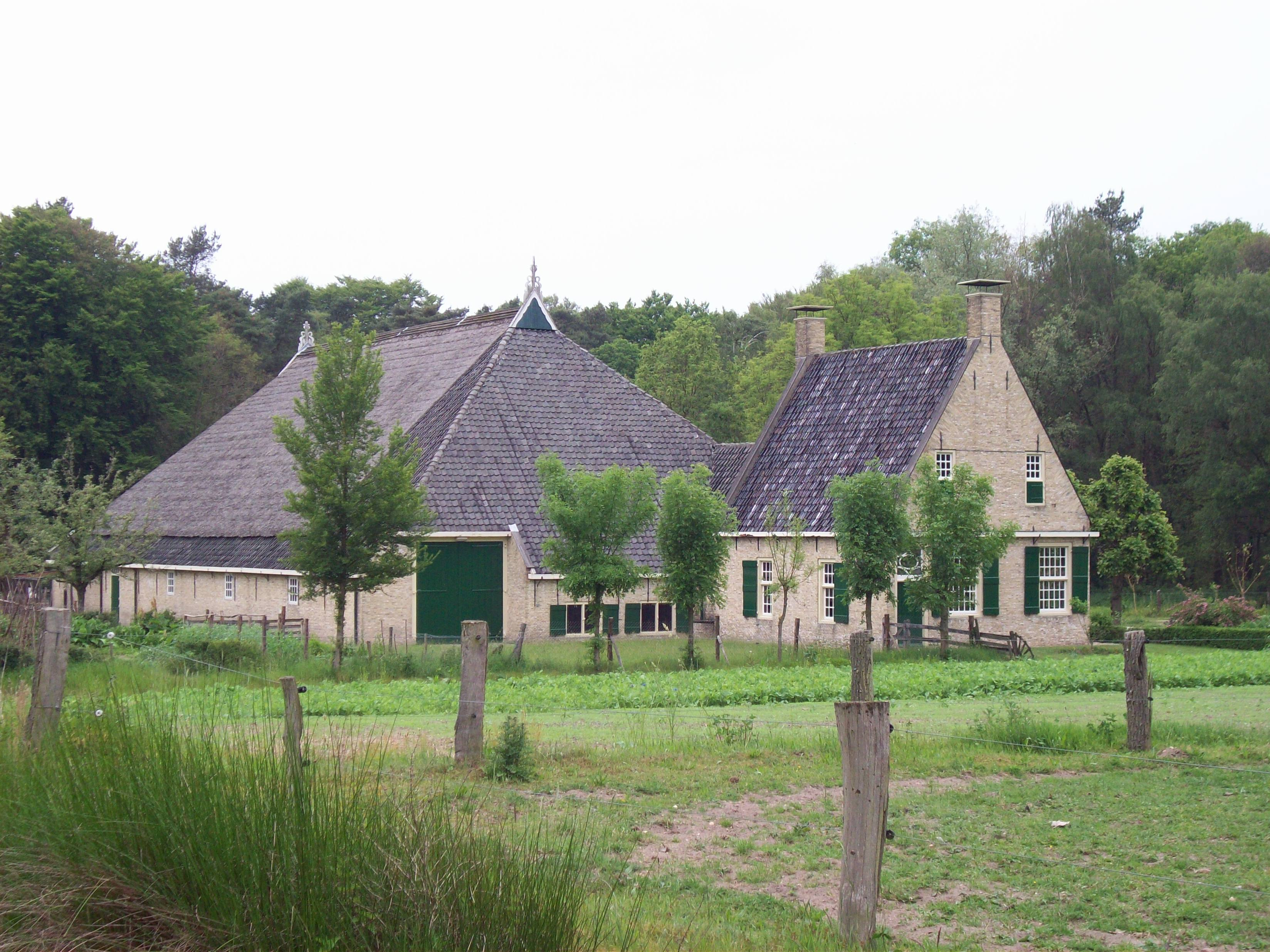
Farm in Midlum

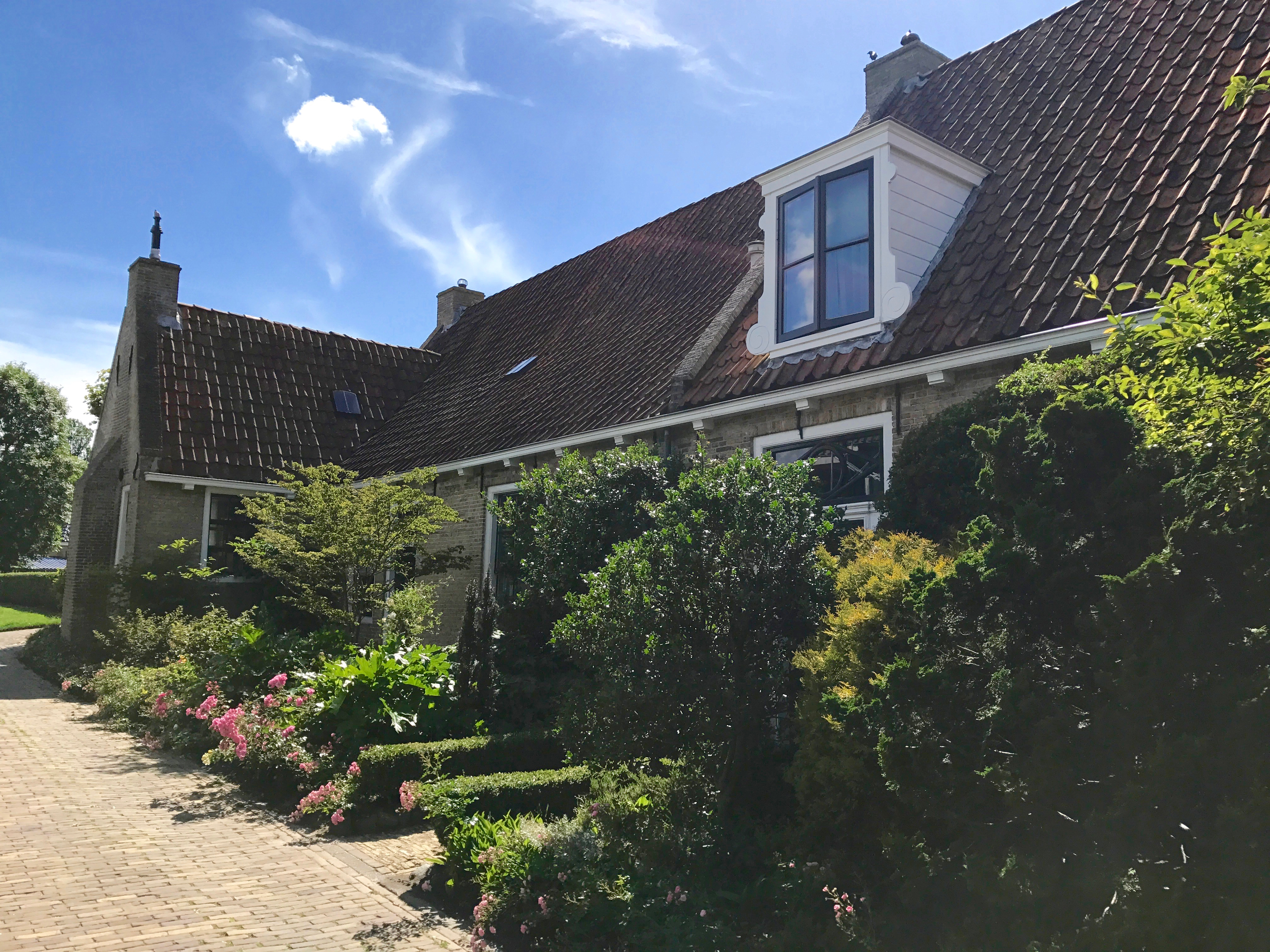
Houses in Midlum
