= Magnus Forteman =

Legendary Frisian general

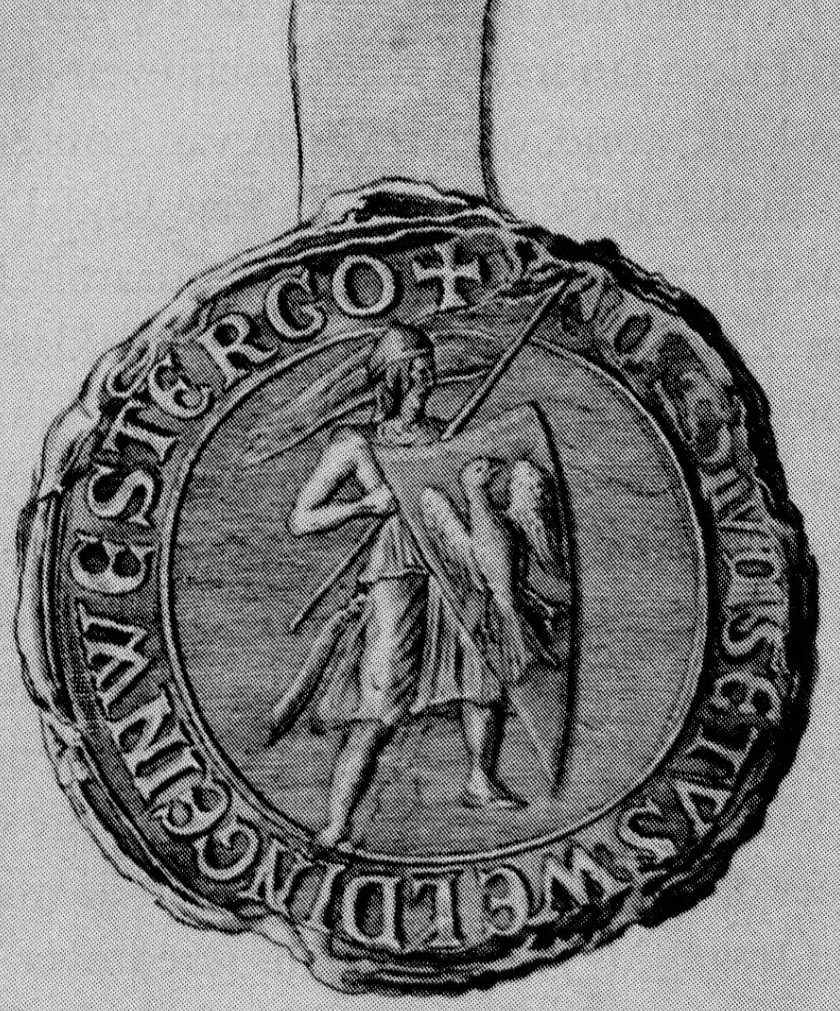
Magnus Forteman on a seal from 1270

Magnus Forteman was the legendary first potestaat (or magistrate governor) and commander of Frisia which is now part of Germany and the Netherlands. His existence is based on a saga's writings.

According to one of these sagas, he was the first of the 17 potestates of Frisia in the period after the kings of Frisia, a period of Charlemagne until Albert of Saxony (800–1498).

The saga relates that Magnus was the leader of the army of Frisians in the conquest of Rome in the year 799. The eyes of Pope Leo III were said to have been pulled out, and he was then expelled from Rome by a group of nobles who did not accept his authority. With 700 "discerning" Frisians, Magnus reconquered Rome from these nobles. They entered Rome at night by a small port that had become visible through low water level in the Tiber. Through the Flavian gardens, they went to St. Peter's and when they were discovered there a battle ensued. Magnus flew his banner clearly visible on top of the church, creating confusion. There were no prisoners, and the Frisians were in Saint Peter's Square up to their ankles in blood.

When asked by the emperor, Magnus requested no payment by way of nobility, but instead requested the right to freedom and free speech forever for all Frisians. Their courage was rewarded with the Karelsprivilege, Friezenprivilege, Vrijheidsprivilege, libertas Frisonica or Previlegii Frisiorum Caroli Magni.

According to the legend, the Frisians elected Magnus, that is all Frisian freemen the born as well as the unborn, as long as the wind blows the clouds and the world lasts. Also Charles gave them a golden crown in the shield, and a half eagle in their coat of arms, as a token that they had received freedom from the Emperor.

According to the legend, Magnus was the founder of Church of Santi Michele e Magno, the Friezenkerk in Rome. His father was said to be Gustavus Forteman who founded the first Christian church in 777 in Friesland, the Cathedral of Almenum. Also Gustavus Forteman is fictional. Magnus was killed fighting against the Saracens.

Generally this story is considered as a myth and the Karelsprivilege as a forgery, although the acclaimed proviledge were confirmed by the Holy Roman Emperors William II (13th century) and Sigismund (15th century). Also Jancko Douwama mentions the conquest of Rome by Magnus, the risk and reward in the form of the Karelsprivilege in his "Book of the Parties" in 1525.
