= Frisian eagle =

A Frisian eagle sable

A Frisian eagle is a specific kind of eagle in Dutch heraldry, consisting of half of a black double-headed eagle on the dexter side of a shield parted per pale.

It originated as a mark of favour granted to certain Frisian noblemen by the Holy Roman Emperor, and is still borne in the arms of a number of Frisian families. The correct blazon in Dutch is: Gedeeld: I in goud een zwarte Friese adelaar komende uit de deellijn [Per pale: Or, a Frisian eagle sable rising from the line of partition.]

== Examples ==
Arms of the town of Sneek

Arms of the Súdwest-Fryslân municipality

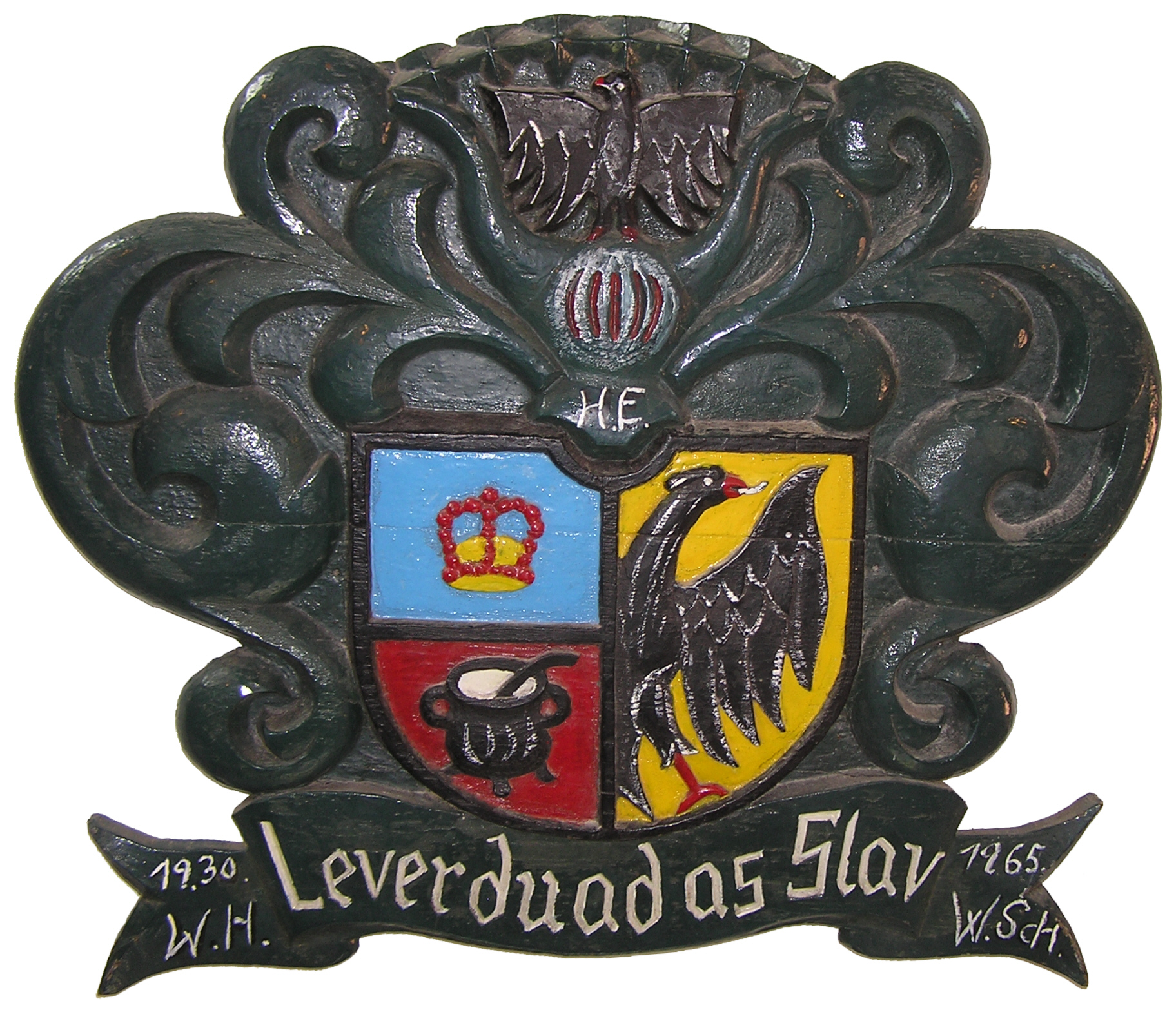
Historical arms of North Frisia with its motto Lever duad as Slav (Better dead than a Slave) where the eagle actually appears in the sinister half. The North Frisian coat of arms is not identical with that of modern Nordfriesland district.

== See also ==
- Karelsprivilege
- Magnus Forteman
- Hessel Hermana
- Grietman
- Reichsadler
