= Achlum =

- Village
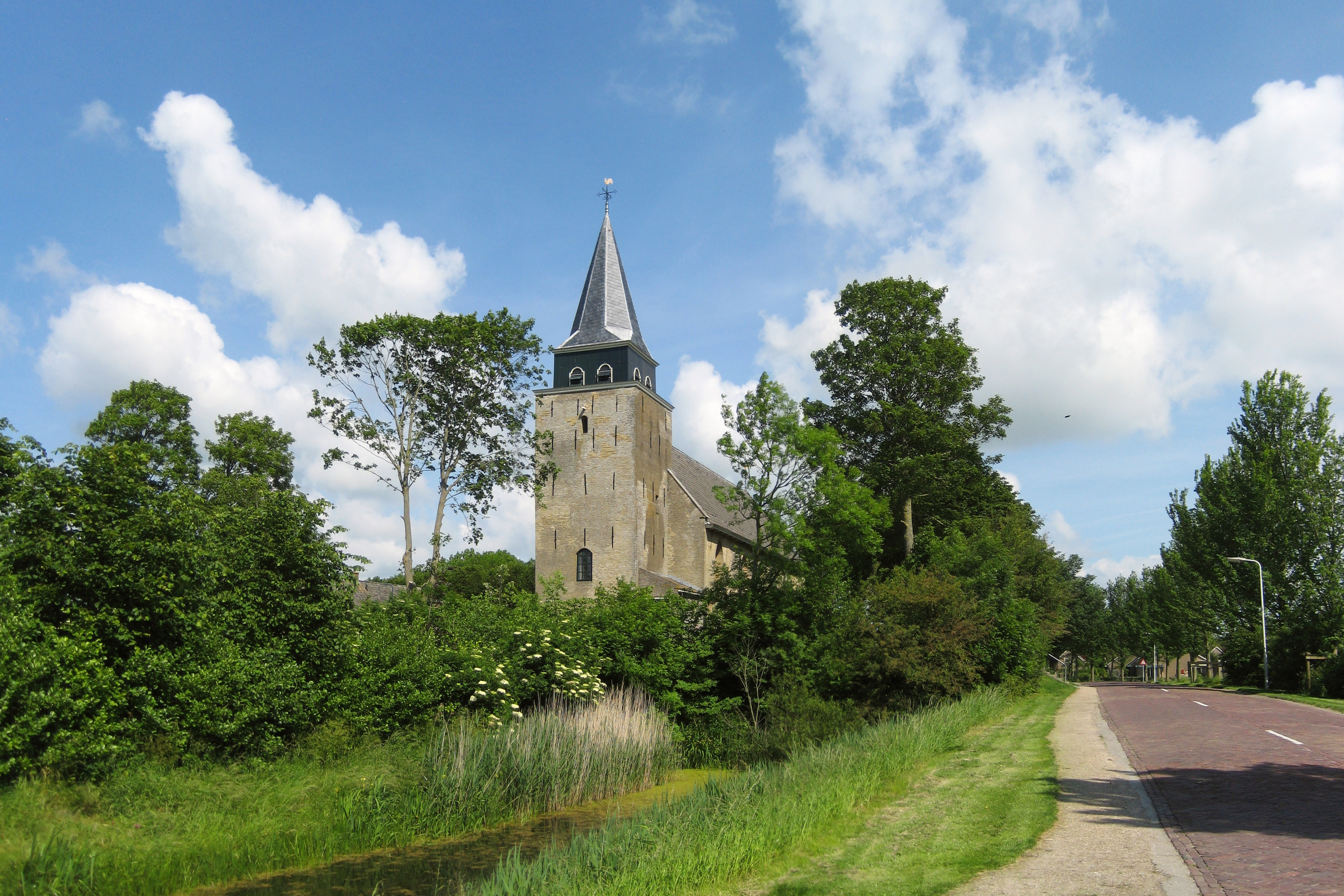
- Achlum church

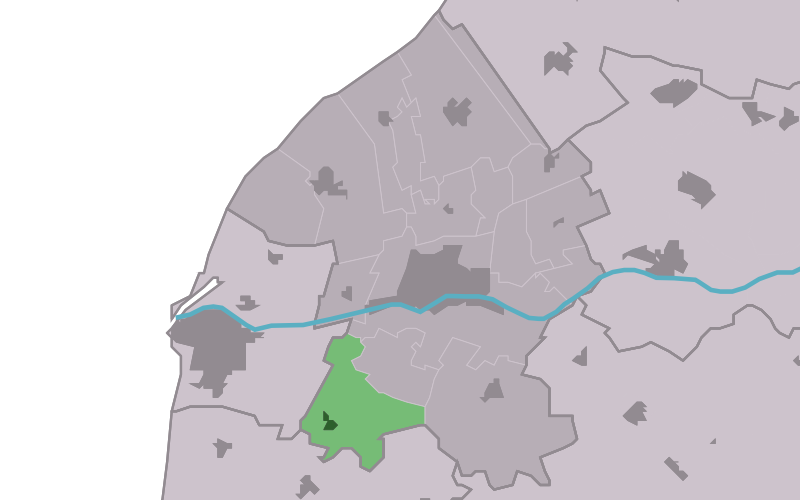
- Location in the Franekeradeel municipality

- Location in the Netherlands Achlum (Netherlands)
- Country: Netherlands
- Province: Friesland
- Municipality: Waadhoeke

Area
  - Total: 7.62 km^{2} (2.94 sq mi)
- Elevation: 0.3 m (0.98 ft)

Population (2021)
  - Total: 595
  - Density: 78.1/km^{2} (202/sq mi)
- Time zone: UTC+1 (CET)
  - Summer (DST): UTC+2 (CEST)
- Postal code: 8806
- Dialing code: 0517

Achlum (Dutch pronunciation: [ˈɑxlʏm]) is a village in the Waadhoeke municipality of Friesland, Netherlands. It is approximately 7 km southwest of the city of Franeker.

Achlum had about 629 inhabitants in January 2014.

== History ==
Before 2018, the village was part of the Franekeradeel municipality. The village has a church which dates from the 12th century and is placed atop a so-called terp mound. Around the year 1260 there was a priory of Augustinian nuns, a part of the Lúntsjerk monastery which was destroyed in 1530. At that time the prior in Achlum was rebuilt but in 1572 the Geuzen destroyed it again. In Achlum used to be a butter factory which processed the milk of local farmers to butter.

In 1811 a farmer from Achlum called Ulbe Piers Draisma established a mutual fire insurance. The insurance society was called Onderlinge Waarborgmaatschappij Achlum.

De Achlumer Molen is a smock mill in Achlum which has been restored to working order. The mill is listed as a Rijksmonument, number 15821.

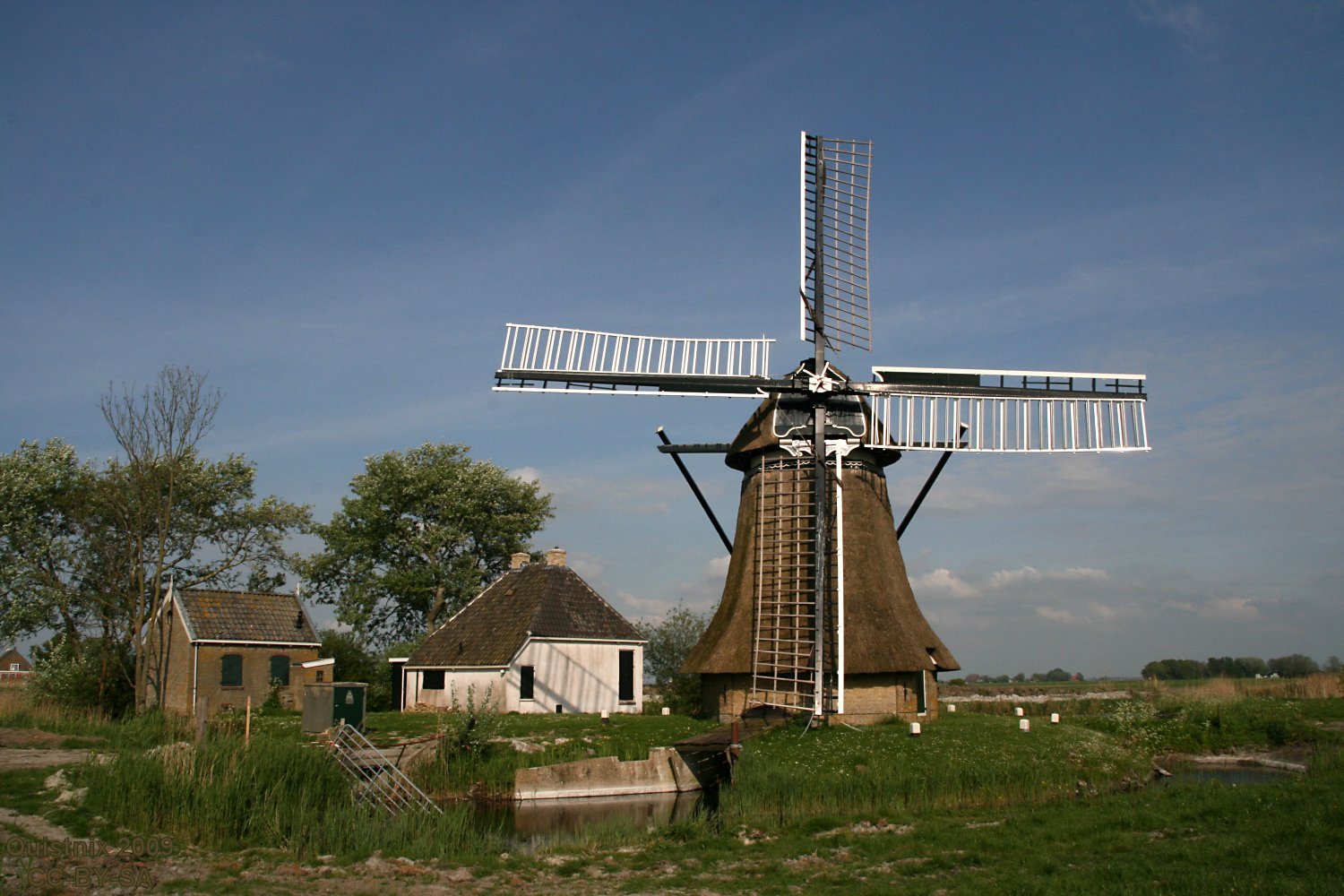
De Achlumer Molen

== Community ==
=== Population ===
- 2009 - 635
- 2008 - 652
- 2005 - 663
- 2004 - 666
- 2003 - 664
- 2002 - 674
- 2001 - 679
- 2000 - 668
- 1999 - 652
- 1973 - 738
- 1969 - 796
- 1964 - 824
- 1959 - 881
- 1954 - 889

=== Notable residents ===
- Ulbe Piers Draisma (1785–1830)), founder of insurance company Achmea

== Gallery ==
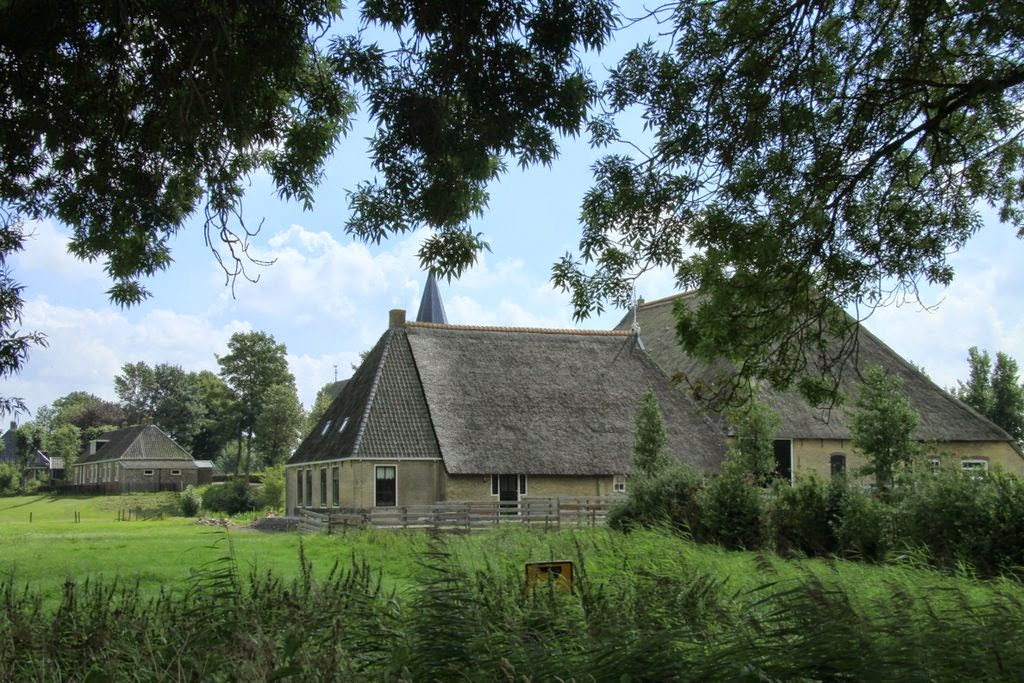
Farm in Achlum

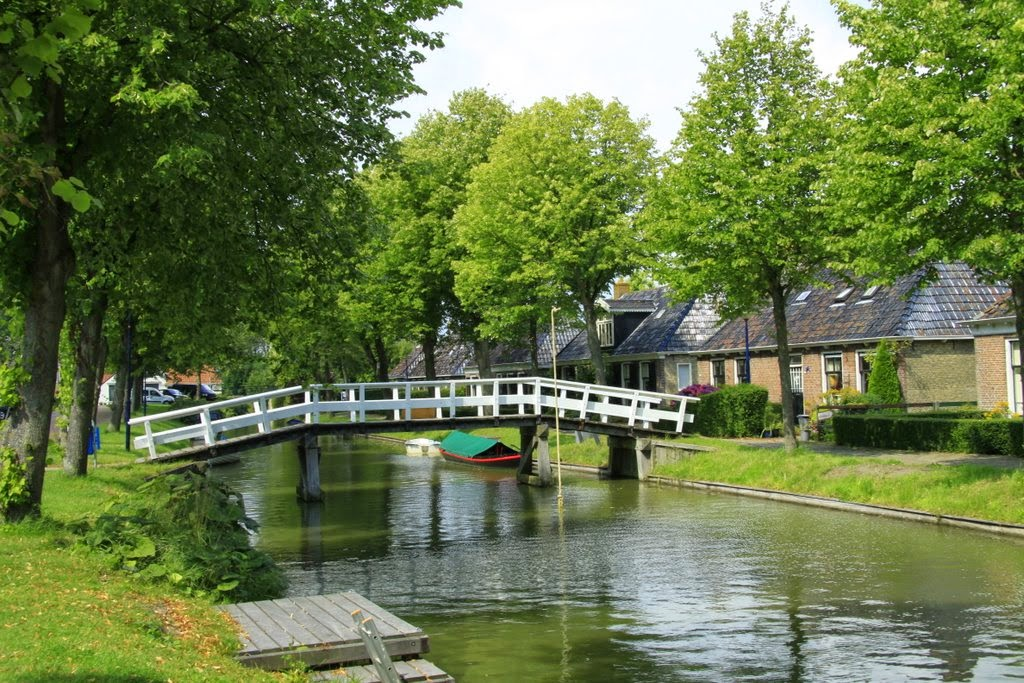
Canal view

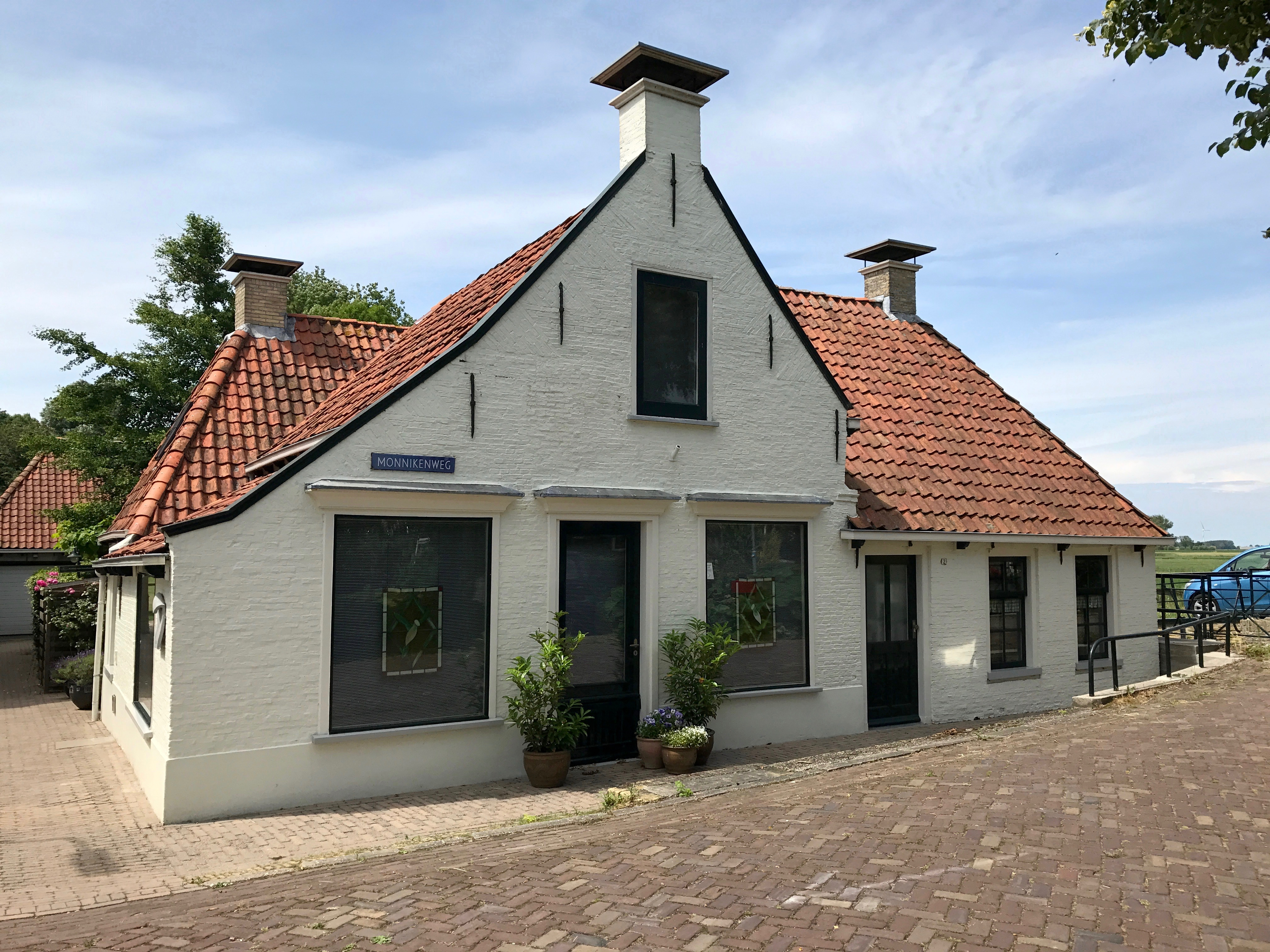
House in Achlum

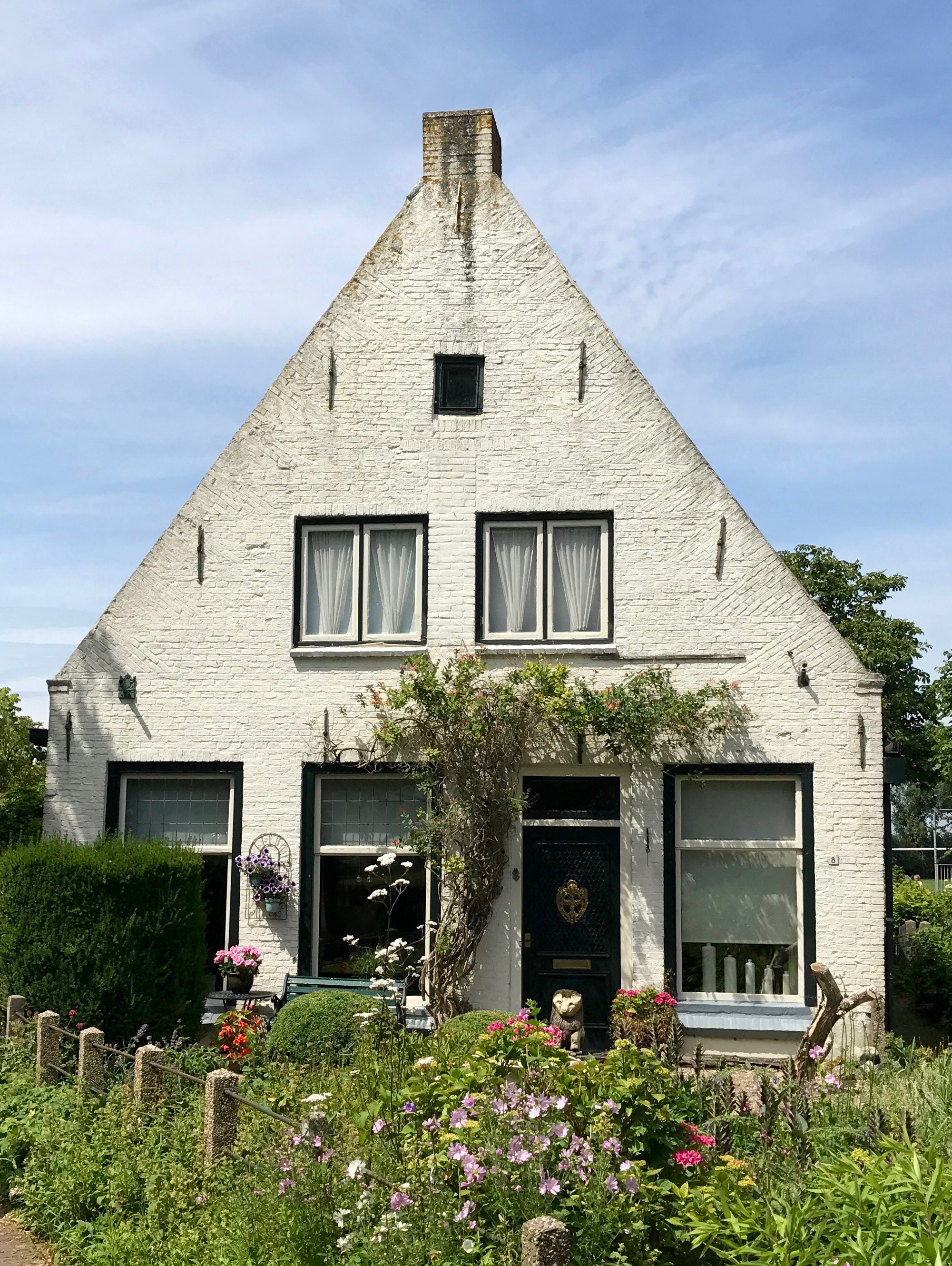
House in Achlum
