= Ferwoude =

Ferwoude Ferwâlde
- Village
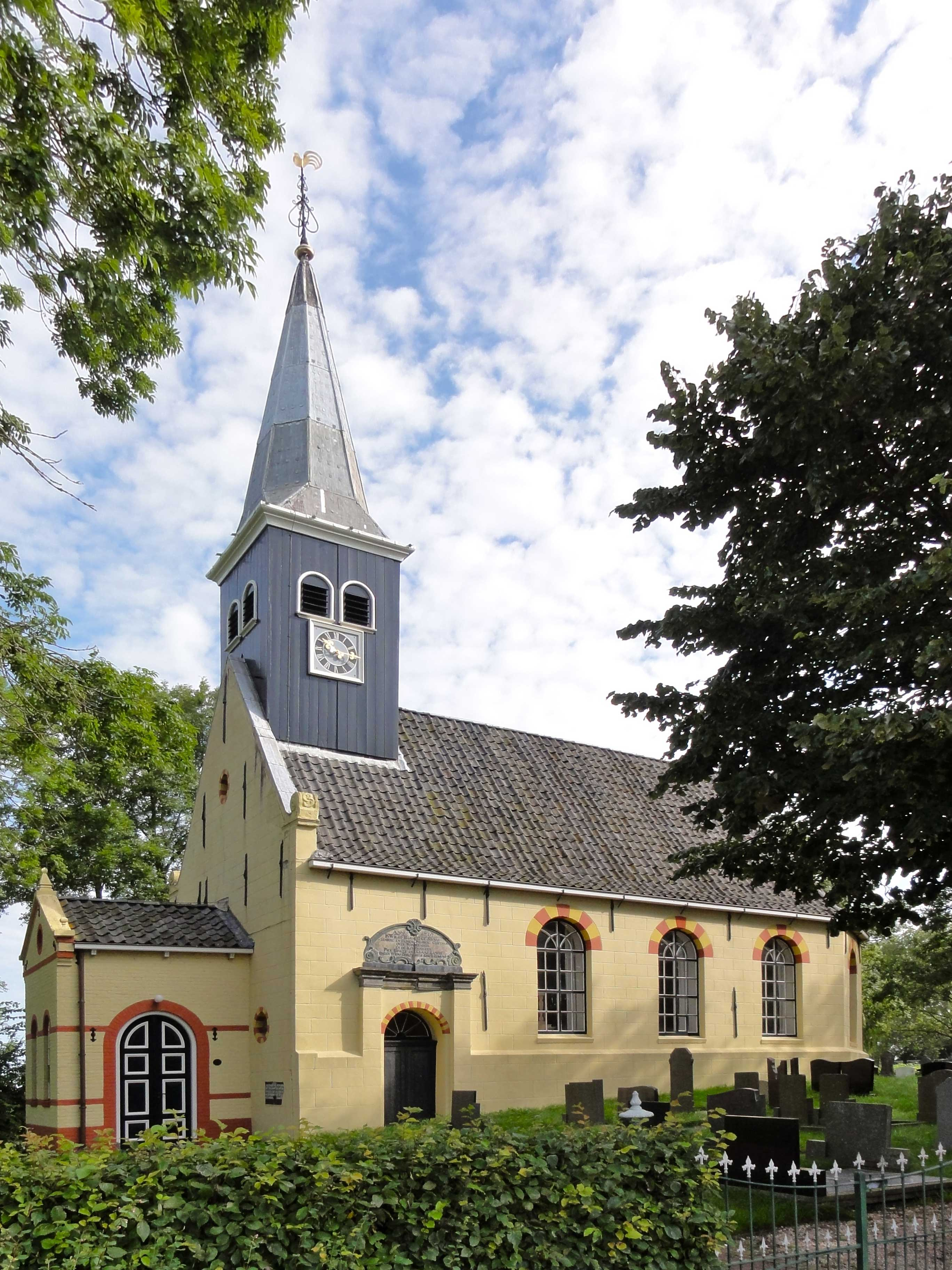
- Ferwoude church

- Flag Coat of arms

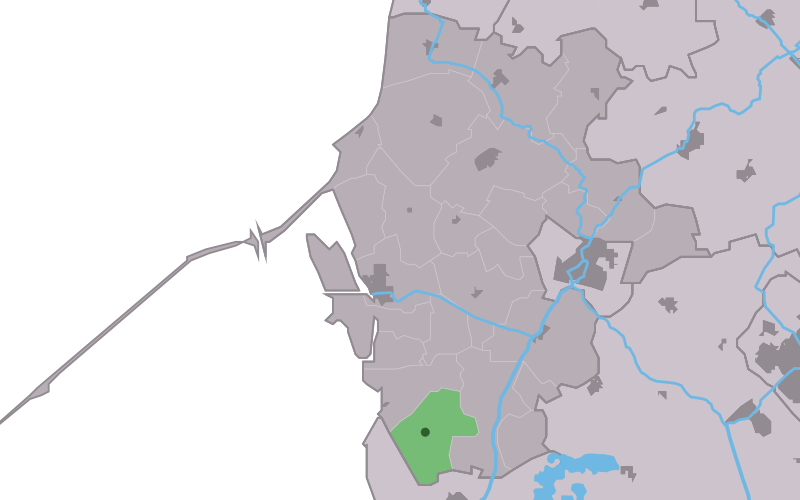
- Location in the former Wûnseradiel municipality

- Location in the Netherlands Ferwoude (Netherlands)
- Country: Netherlands
- Province: Friesland
- Municipality: Súdwest-Fryslân

Area
  - Total: 7.16 km^{2} (2.76 sq mi)
- Elevation: −1.0 m (−3.3 ft)

Population (2021)
  - Total: 225
  - Density: 31.4/km^{2} (81.4/sq mi)
- Time zone: UTC+1 (CET)
  - Summer (DST): UTC+2 (CEST)
- Postal code: 8761
- Dialing code: 0515

Ferwoude (West Frisian: Ferwâlde) is a village in Súdwest-Fryslân municipality in the province of Friesland, the Netherlands. It had a population of around 235 in January 2017.

== History ==
The village was first mentioned in the 13th century as Forwalda, and means "before (=close to) the woods". Ferwoude is an agriculture community close to the former Zuiderzee dike. It is mainly low-lying land which used for animal husbandry.

The Dutch Reformed church dates from 1767 and was a replacement of a 13th century church. Ferwoude had a school before 1800. It was forced to close in 2015-2016 due to lack of students. Nowadays, it contains the village house.

Ferwoude was home to 109 people in 1840. Before 2011, the village was part of the Wûnseradiel municipality.

== Gallery ==
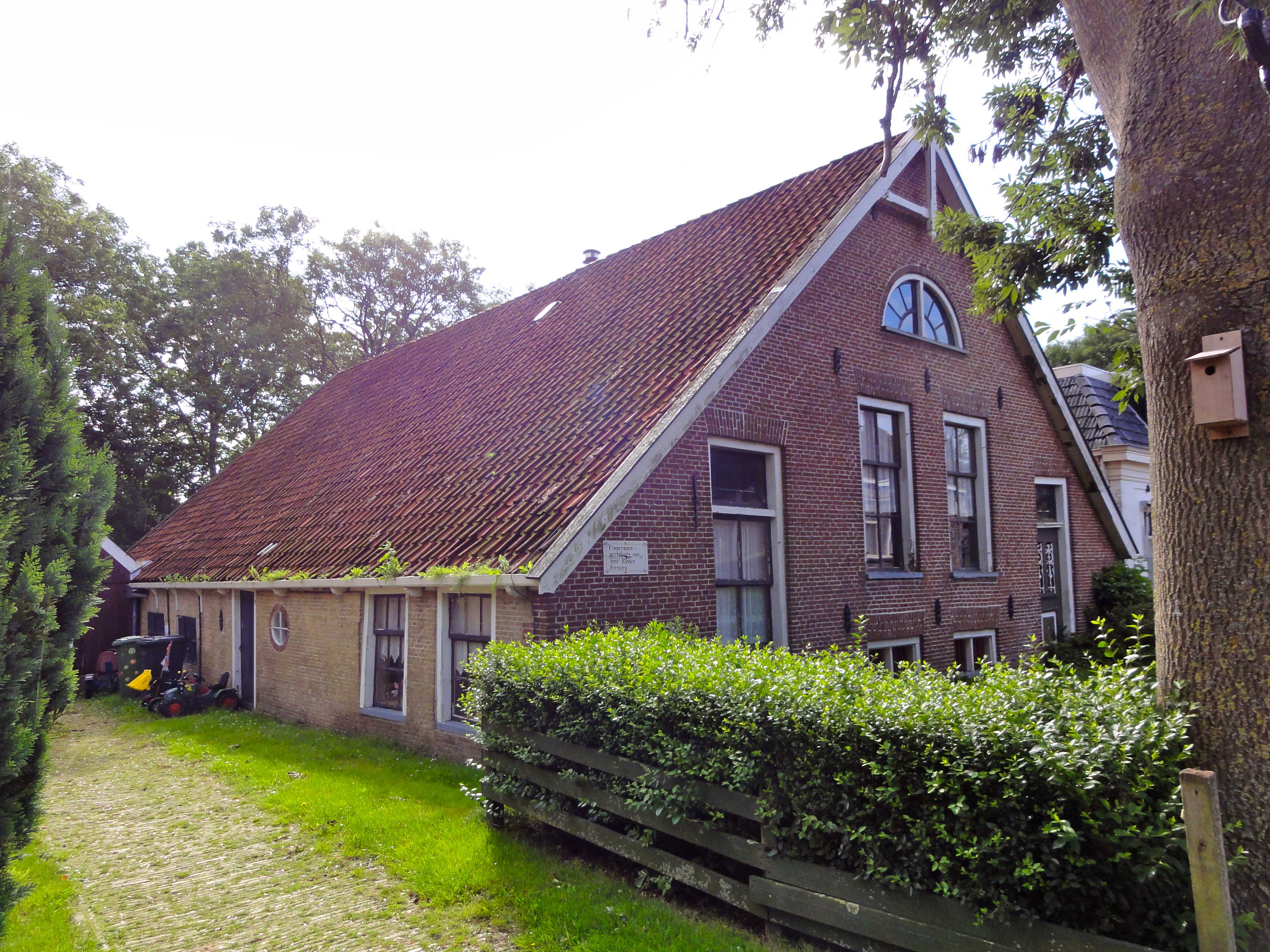
Farm in Ferwoude

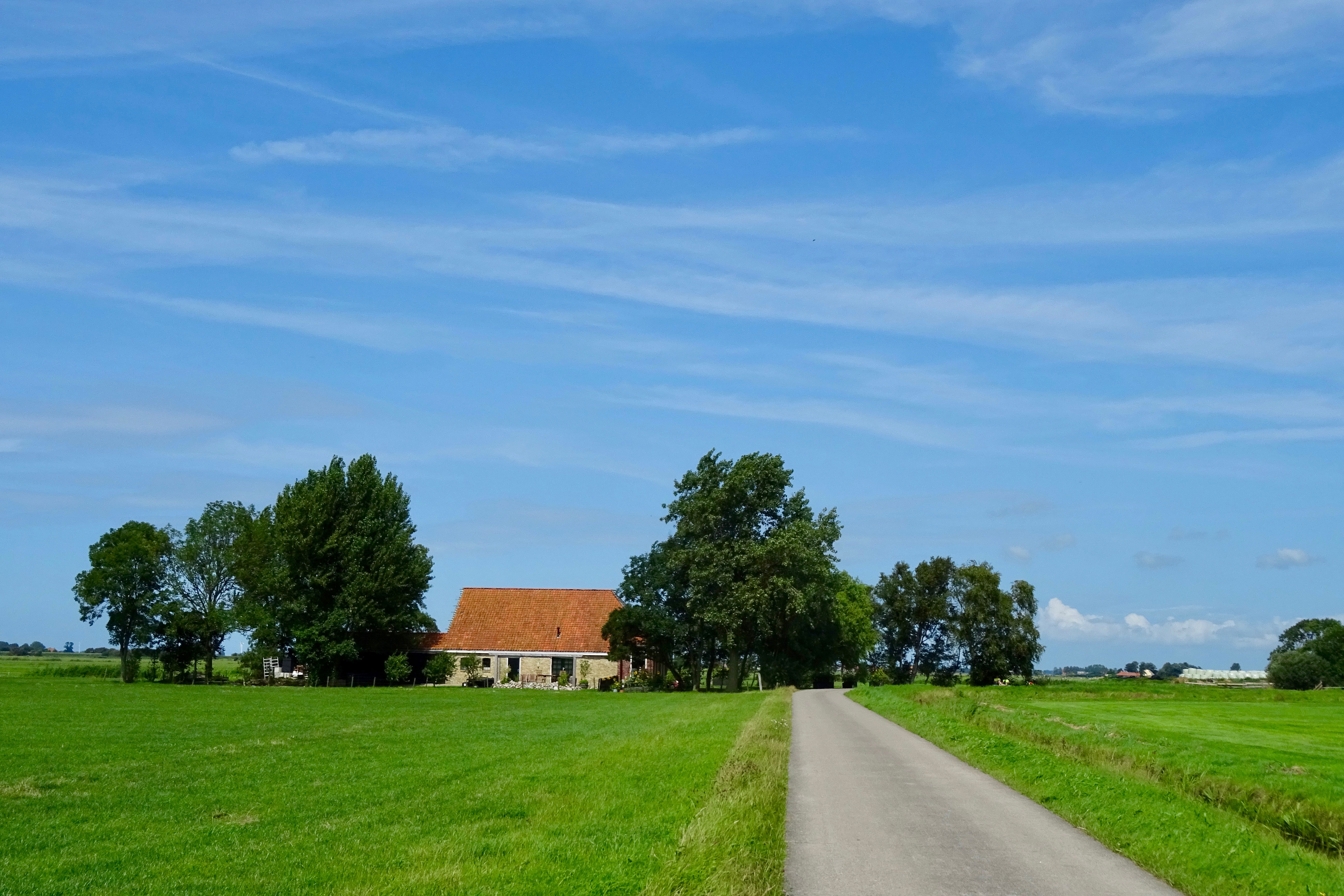
View on a farm
