= Herbaijum =

Herbaijum Hjerbeam
- Village
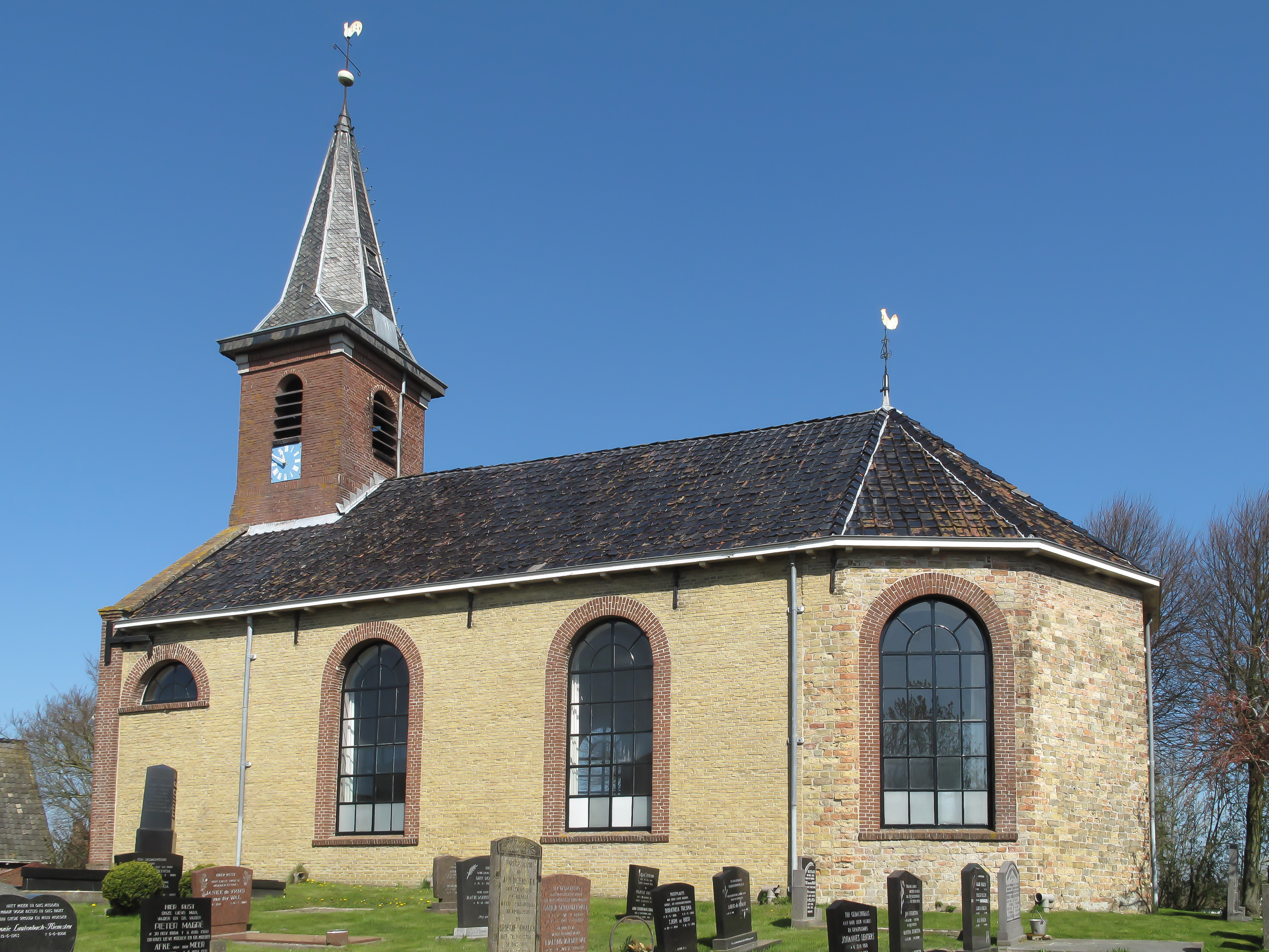
- Herbaijum church

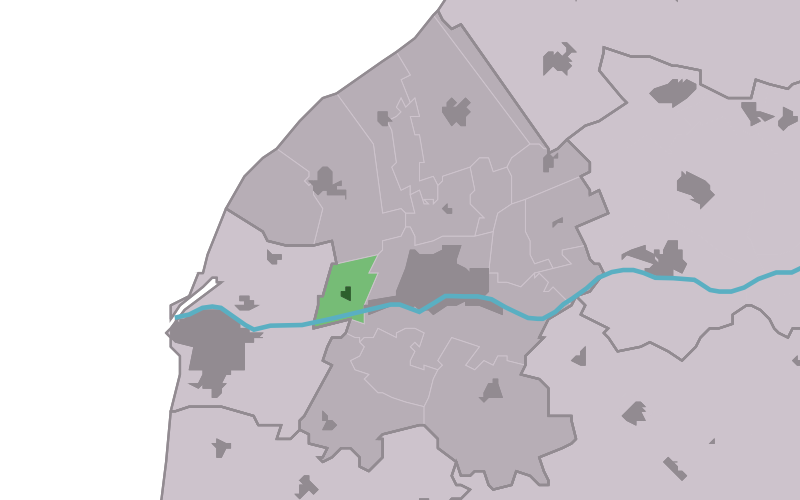
- Location in the Franekeradeel municipality

- Location in the Netherlands Herbaijum (Netherlands)
- Country: Netherlands
- Province: Friesland
- Municipality: Waadhoeke

Area
  - Total: 3.05 km^{2} (1.18 sq mi)
- Elevation: 0.3 m (0.98 ft)

Population (2021)
  - Total: 260
  - Density: 85/km^{2} (220/sq mi)
- Time zone: UTC+1 (CET)
  - Summer (DST): UTC+2 (CEST)
- Postal code: 8807
- Dialing code: 0517

Herbaijum (West Frisian: Hjerbeam) is a village in Waadhoeke municipality in the province Friesland of the Netherlands and had around 253 citizens in January 2014. Until 2018, the village was part of the Franekeradeel municipality.

== History ==
The village was first mentioned in the 13th century as Herbadingum, and means "settlement of the people of Herbad (person)". Herbaijum is a small terp (artificial living hill) village.

The stins Sikkema State was built in the 15th century or earlier. One of the inhabitants was Sicco van Goslinga, grietman (mayor/judge) of Frankeradeel and curator of the University of Franeker. In the late-18th century, the estate was torn down and replaced by a farm, and only the gate remains.

Herbaijum was home to 215 people in 1840.

== Church ==
The church was built in the Middle Ages; general estimates point to establishment around the second half of the 13th century. It was dedicated to Nicolaos van Myra.

A near complete restoration of the church, except for the north wall, was undertaken in 1872 under the guidance of architect P.J. Jaarsma. The north wall consists largely of yellow, mediaeval bricks—called kloostermoppen—which were locally repaired. Any missing ones were replaced by similar small, yellow bricks made locally in Frisia. The tower on the west side was probably built in the 1920s, and has a constricted, octagonal spire and is roofed with slate tiles.

According to a gable stone, the church was again restored in 1985.

== Demographics ==
=== Population ===
- 1954 - 278
- 1959 - 273
- 1964 - 255
- 1969 - 290
- 1973 - 241
- 2003 - 294

=== Notable people ===
- Sicco van Goslinga, (1664–1730) statesman
- Jopie Huisman (1922–2000), autodidactic painter and rag-and-bone man. Huisman ran a scrap metal company in Herbaijum and is buried in the village.

== Gallery ==
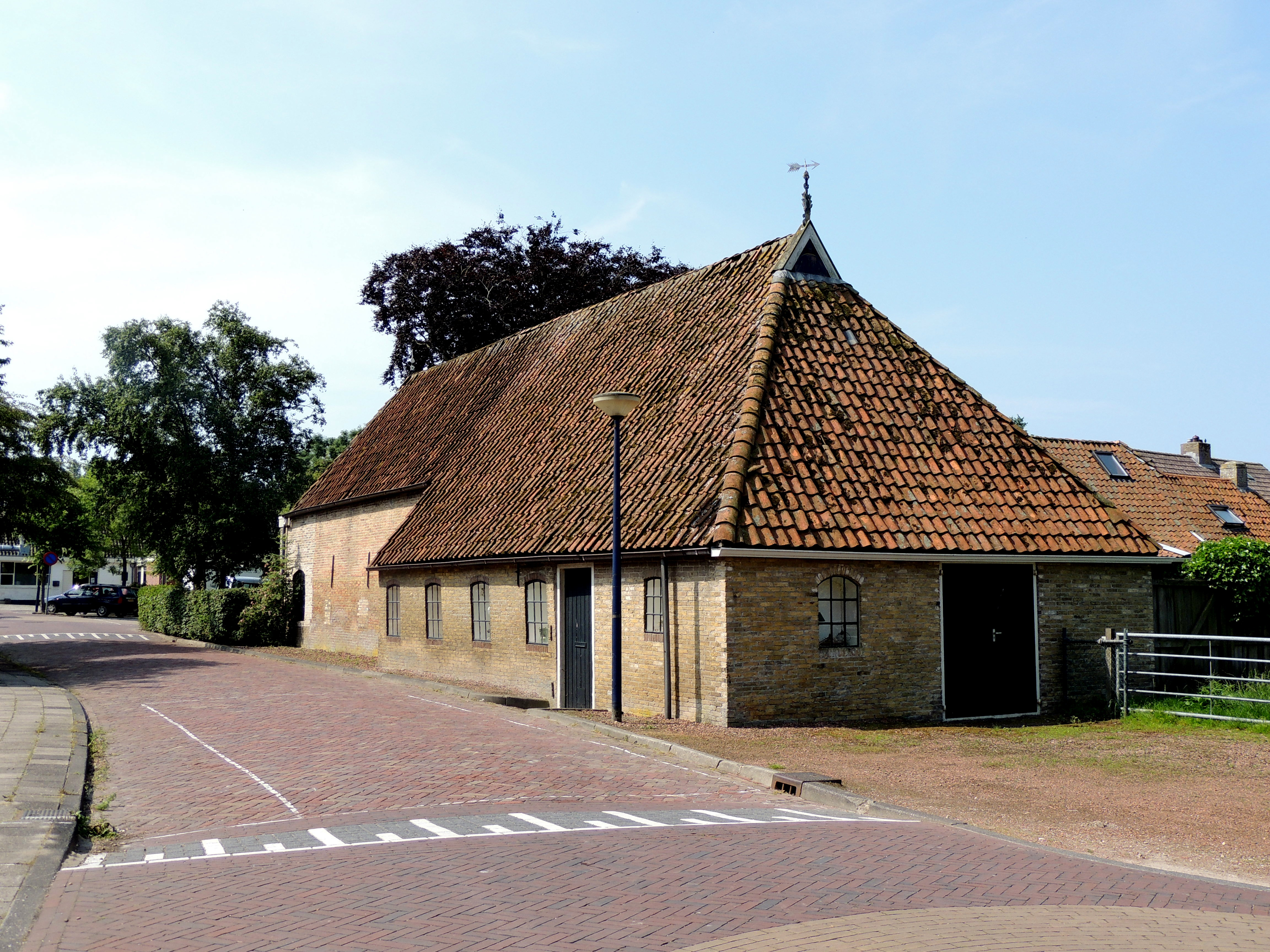
Farm in Herbaijum

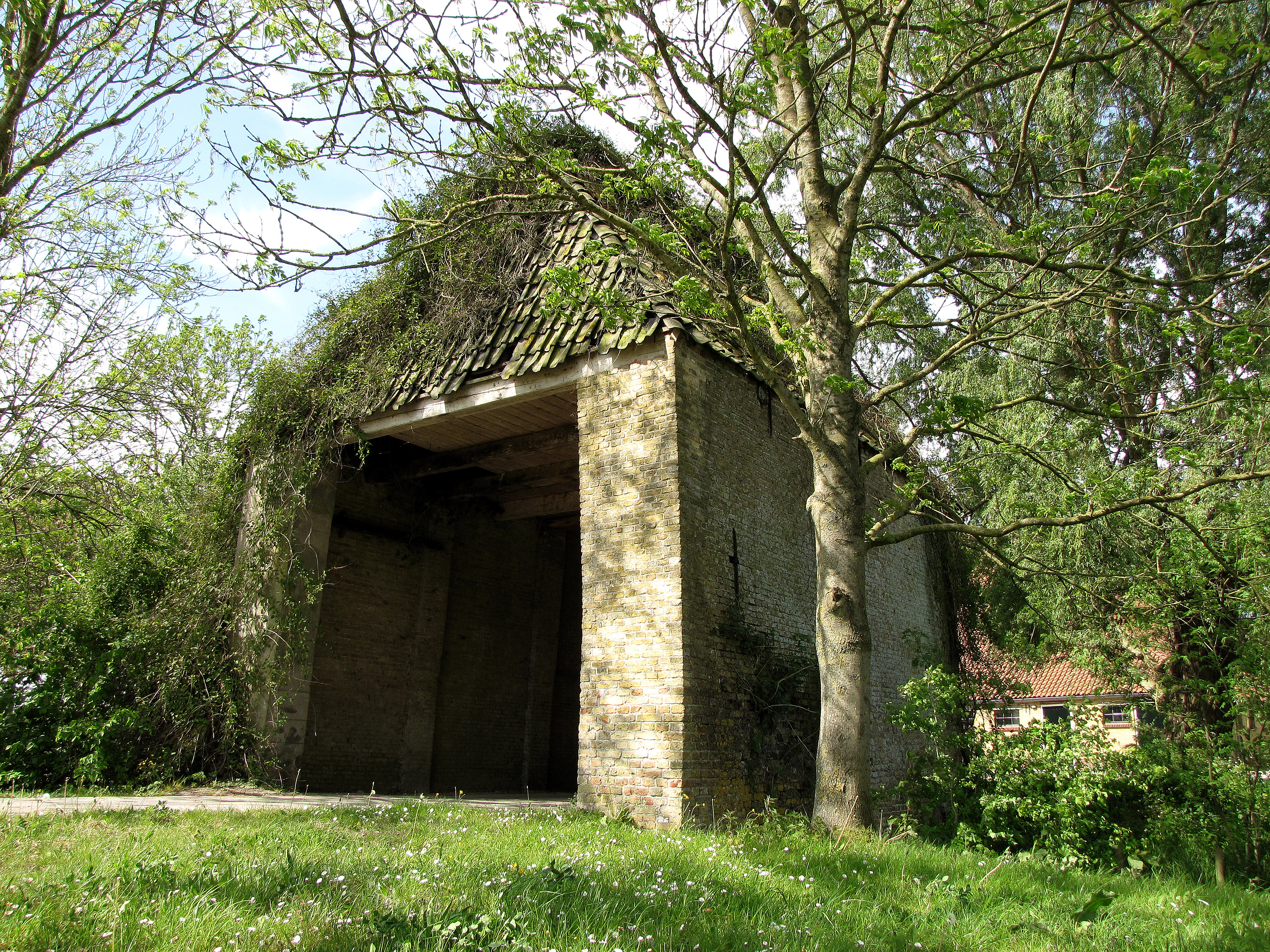
Gate building of Sickema State

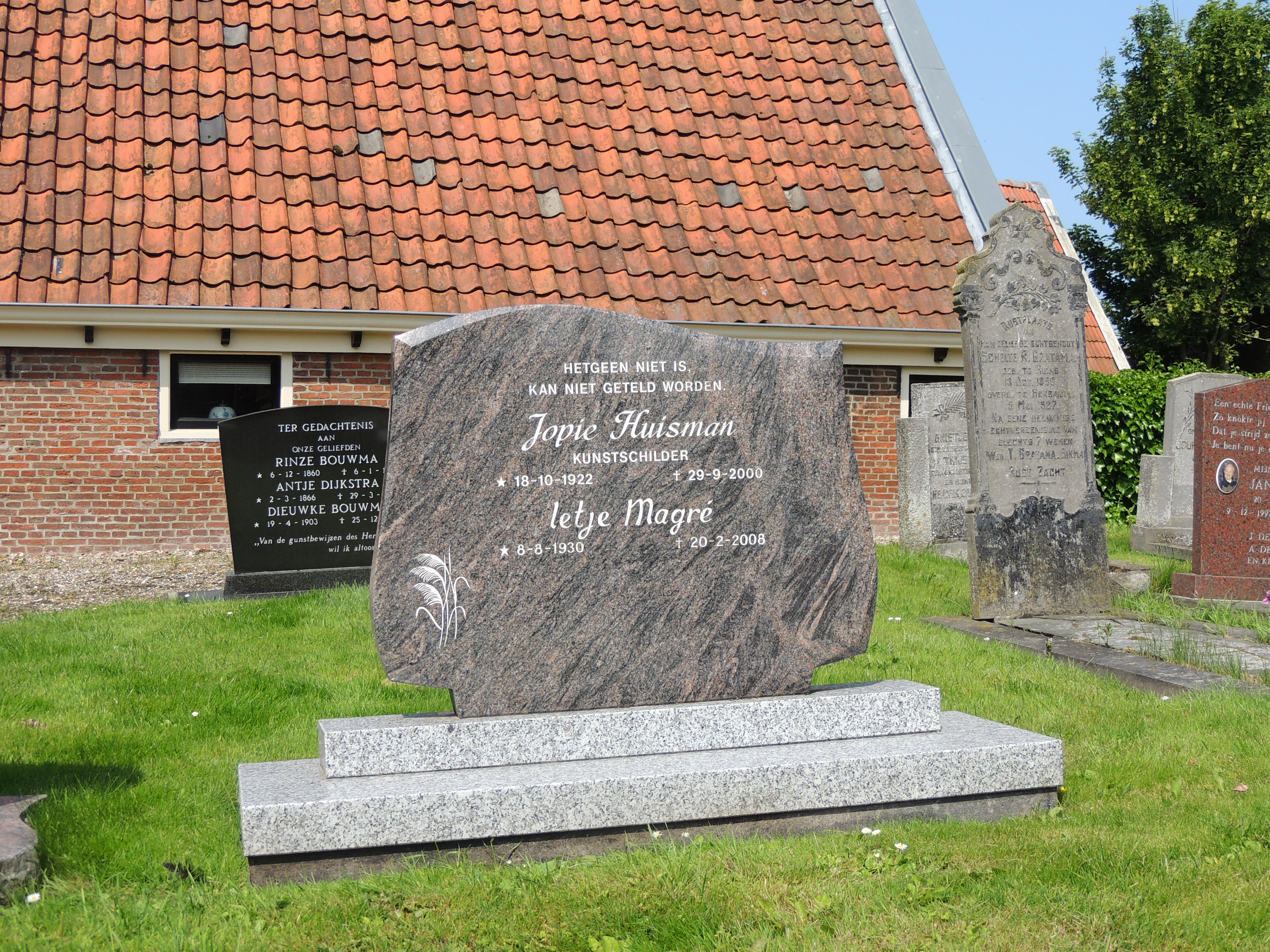
Grave of Jopie Huisman
