= Jopie Huisman =

Dutch painter

Coordinates: 52.97969°N 5.44371°E

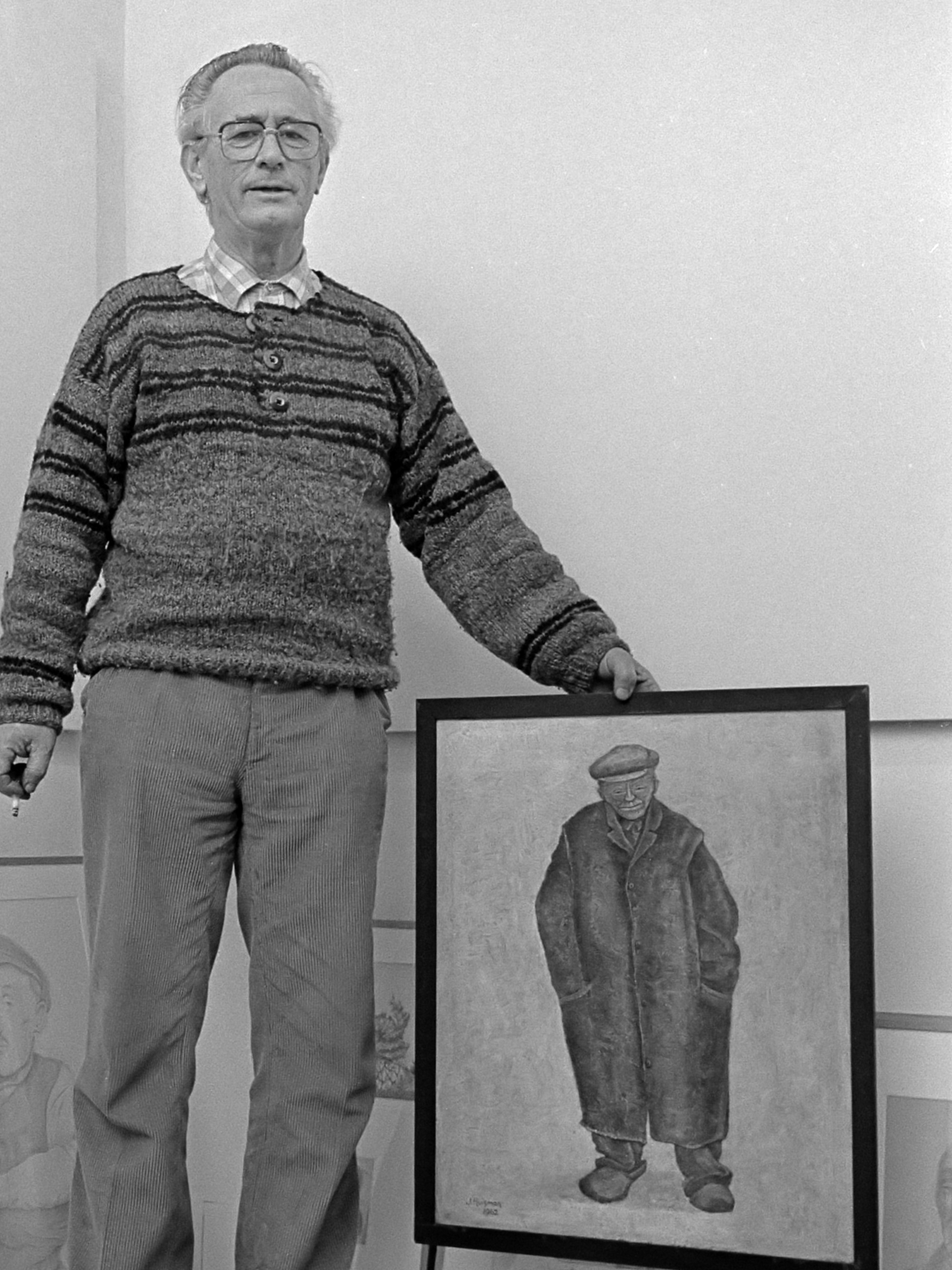
- Jopie Huisman with a painting of his fellow rags-and-bone man Euzie (1986)
- Born: Jotje Huisman; 18 October 1922; Workum, Netherlands
- Died: 29 September 2000 (aged 77); Groningen, Netherlands
- Occupations: Painter and rag-and-bone man
- Website: jopiehuismanmuseum.nl

Jopie Huisman (18 October 1922 – 29 September 2000) was a Dutch autodidactic painter and rag-and-bone man. During his lifetime, he became known for his meticulous and realistic paintings. Huisman refused to sell any of his paintings. On 11 April 1986, Huisman opened his own museum.

== Biography ==
Jopie Huisman was born on 18 October 1922 in Workum, Friesland. In 1939, he became a ceramics painter at the earthenware factory of Aurora. In 1942, he was arrested during a raid and put to work at a labor camp in Kassel, Germany. One day, he was looking at the sky and thought he saw a flock of geese. Suddenly the factory next door collapsed. The bombing of Kassel had started. Huisman managed to escape from the camp, and found refuge in Workum. In 1949, he married Eelkje de Boer, started a business, and a family.

In 1953, his business failed, and Huisman became a rag-and-bone man, buying and selling old clothes and scrap metal. He walked the streets of Workum for eight years. In 1963, he moved to Herbayum, and started to specialize in scrap metal. He had been painting and drawing as a hobby all his life, and in 1963 got his first exhibition in Harlingen. In 1968, van Gewest tot Gewest, a television show with regional stories, aired a program about Jopie Huisman, giving his paintings national exposure.

In 1973, his marriage failed. He started to paint the old clothes, worn-out shoes, children's dolls, and other items he had in storage. His exhibitions were becoming increasingly popular. In 1981, 26,000 people visited an exhibition in Haarlem. Huisman also received offers to sell his paintings, but he always refused out of principle. In 1984, he exhibited his work in an art gallery in Nuenen. The gallery was broken into, and three of his paintings were stolen. This resulted in Huisman refusing to participate in any more exhibitions.

== Museum ==
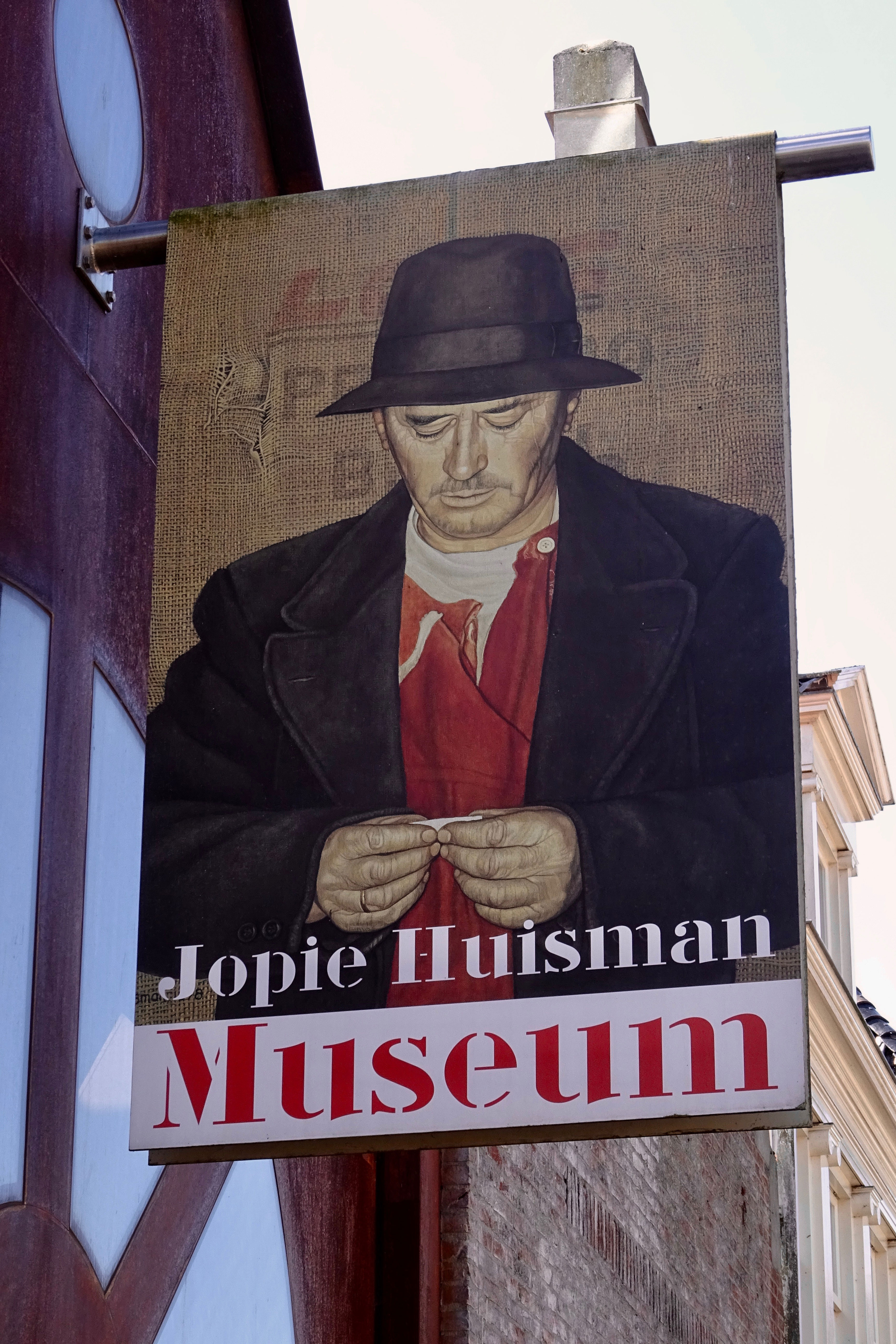
The entrance sign of the museum with a self portrait

On 11 April 1986, Huisman opened his own museum in his native Workum. The museum was housed in a stepped gabled building from 1663. The number of visitors exceeded expectations, and the building turned out to be too small. On 29 February 1992, a newly built museum was opened in Workum to exhibit his paintings.

== Death ==
On 29 September 2000, Huisman died at the age of 77. Huisman's coffin was transported from his museum to the cemetery in a horse drawn rag-and-bone man's cart.

== Aftermath ==
In 2010, an unknown watercolor painting by Huisman was discovered by his son. The painting was dated March 2000. In the same year, a painting of a pair of shoes which he had given away to a friend, was auctioned at Christie's for €49,000. In 2016, three drawings made in the late 1940s were discovered in an old box.

== Bibliography ==
- Hesseling, Joost (1996). Jopie Huisman: Schilder van het mededogen (in Dutch). Haarlem: De Toorts. ISBN 9060205057.
